= Canton of Le Montet =

Coordinates: 46°24′35″N 3°03′22″E

Le Montet
- Former canton
- Interactive map of Le Montet
- Country: France
- Region: Auvergne-Rhône-Alpes
- Department: Allier
- No. of communes: {{{nbcomm}}}
- Disbanded: 2015
- Area: 268.97 km^{2} (103.85 sq mi)
- Population (2012): 5,115
  - Density: 19.02/km^{2} (49.25/sq mi)

The canton of Le Montet is a former administrative division in central France. It was disbanded following the French canton reorganisation which came into effect in March 2015. It consisted of 11 communes, which joined the canton of Souvigny in 2015. It had 5,115 inhabitants (2012).

The canton comprised the following communes:

- Châtel-de-Neuvre
- Châtillon
- Cressanges
- Deux-Chaises
- Meillard
- Le Montet
- Rocles
- Saint-Sornin
- Le Theil
- Treban
- Tronget

== Demographics ==
Historical population Canton of Le Montet
Year	1962	1968	1975	1982	1990	1999
Pop.	6,038	6,499	5,825	5,528	5,238	4,966
±%	—	+7.6%	−10.4%	−5.1%	−5.2%	−5.2%
From the year 1962 on: No double counting – residents of multiple communes (e.g. students and military personnel) are counted only once. Source: INSEE

== See also ==
- Cantons of the Allier department
