= Autry-Issards =

- Commune
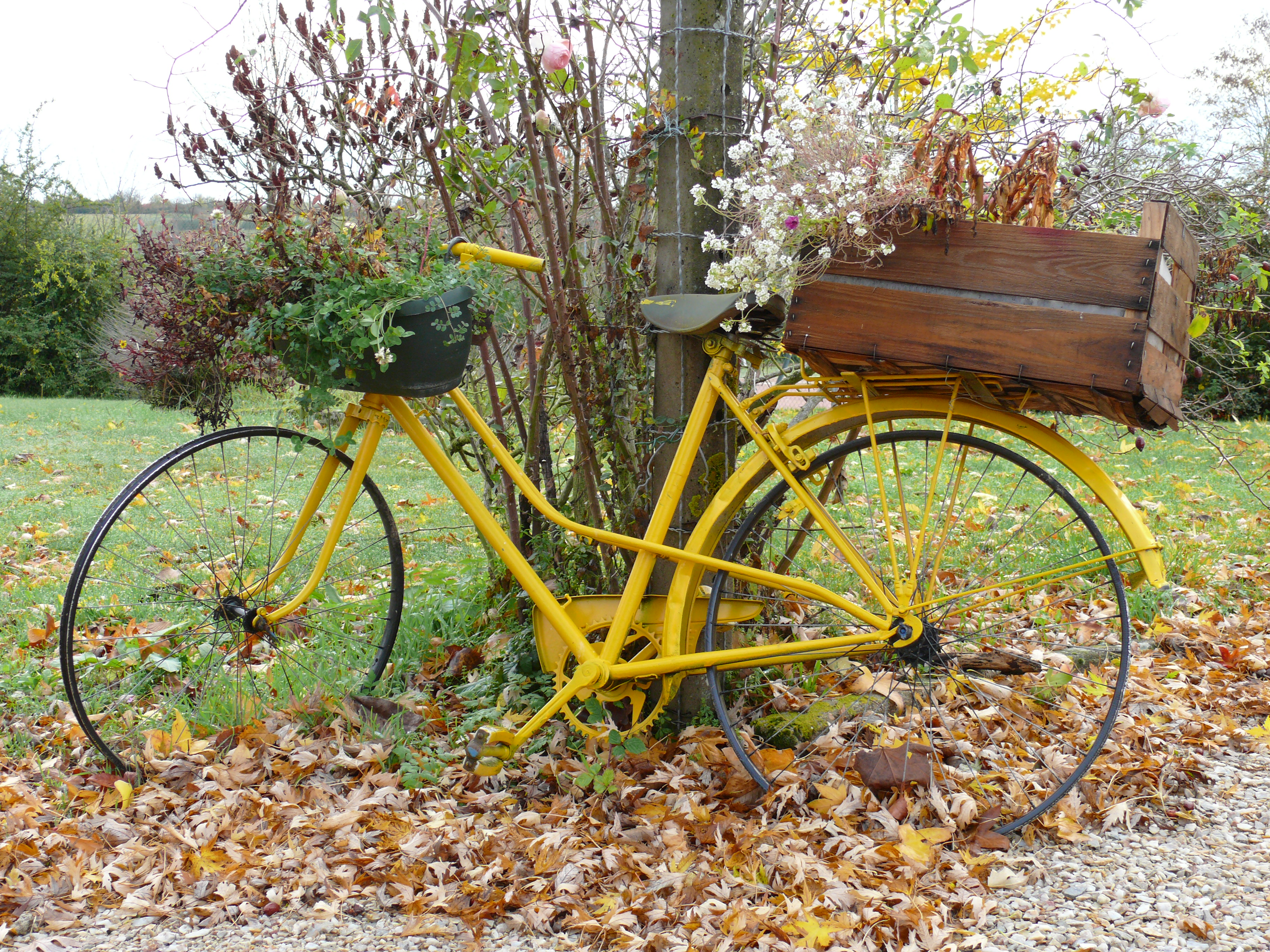
- Autry-Issards decorated bicycle
- Location of Autry-Issards
- Location within France Location within Auvergne-Rhône-Alpes
- Coordinates: 46°32′58″N 3°08′11″E
- Country: France
- Region: Auvergne-Rhône-Alpes
- Department: Allier
- Arrondissement: Moulins
- Canton: Souvigny
- Intercommunality: CC Bocage Bourbonnais

Government
  - Mayor (2026–32): Joël Bogacz
- Area^{1}: 19.45 km^{2} (7.51 sq mi)
- Elevation: 180 m (590 ft)
- Highest elevation: 335 m (1,099 ft)
- Lowest elevation: 227 m (745 ft)
- Population (2023): 313
  - Density: 16.1/km^{2} (41.7/sq mi)
- Time zone: UTC+01:00 (CET)
  - Summer (DST): UTC+02:00 (CEST)
- INSEE/Postal code: 03012 /03210
- ^{1} French Land Register data, which excludes lakes, ponds, glaciers > 1 km^{2} (0.386 sq mi or 247 acres) and river estuaries.

Autry-Issards (French pronunciation: [otʁi isaʁ]) is a commune in the Allier department in the Auvergne-Rhône-Alpes region of central France.

The inhabitants of the commune are known as Issardiens or Issardiennes.

== Geography ==
Autry-Issards is located some 14 kilometres (8.7 mi) west of Moulins and 5 kilometres (3.1 mi) north-west of Souvigny. Access to the commune is by the D134 from Bourbon-l'Archambault in the north-west to the village and also the D104 goes to Souvigny in the south-east. The D58 comes from Saint-Menoux in the north-east and passes through the village before continuing south-east to join the D11 east of Gipcy. The D293 comes from Saint-Menoux in the north-east and passes through the north of the commune before turning south to join the D58 west of the commune. The D73 passes through the commune in the south going from Gipcy to Souvigny. Apart from the village itself, there are the hamlets of:

- Ardennes
- Les Barons
- La Basse Troliere
- Beau Merle
- Beau Soleil
- Bordiere
- Boucheron
- Les Burches
- Champ Juvenier
- Les Chaumes
- Charbonneau
- Chateau d'Issards
- Chateau du Plessis
- Les Chenardeieres
- Coulette
- La Croix de Fromenteau
- Les Etanieres
- La Foultiere
- Fromenteau
- Les Genivres
- Le Grand Bigut
- La Grand Mouillere
- Jaliere
- Le Livrot
- La Loge
- Le Mai
- Malleret
- Le Moulin de la Pirouette
- Les Noisettes
- L'Ouche
- Les Pechoirs
- La Peliere
- Les Perolles
- Le Petit Bigut
- Le Petit Mai
- Les Planches
- Provencheres
- Rancy
- Les Renauds
- Rimasoir
- La Rouche Coupee
- Saint-Priest
- La Troliere
- La Tuilerie de Malleret
- Les Ulferts
- Vilban
- Villard
- Virjolais

The commune is mostly farmland with a few scattered patches of forest.

The Ourts river rises in the south of the commune and flows north-east to join the Burge south-east of Couzon. The Rose rises in the south-west of the commune and flows north-east to join the Ours.

=== Neighbouring communes and villages ===
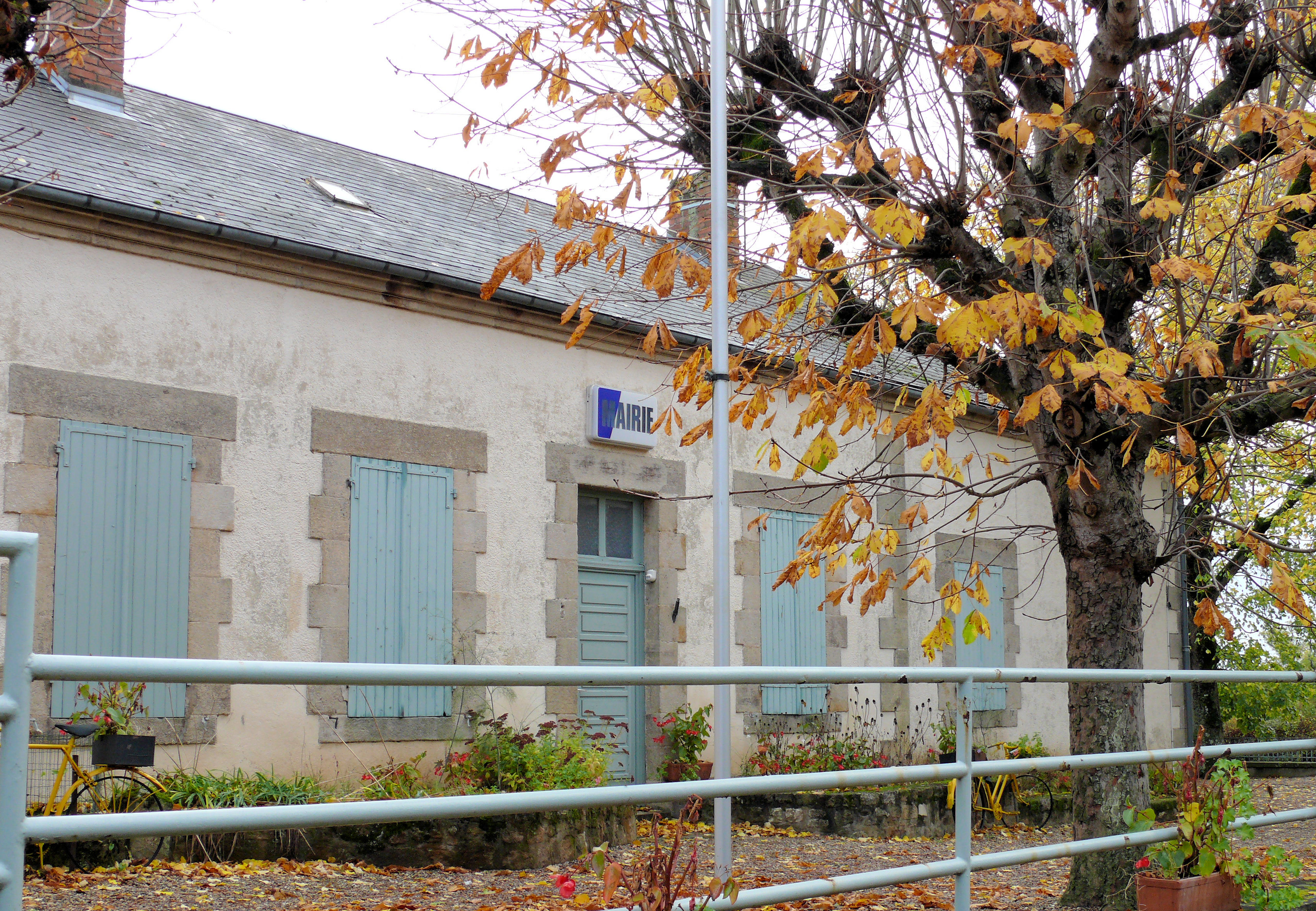
The Town Hall

== Demography ==
Historical population

Year	Pop.	±% p.a.
1793	590	—
1821	665	+0.43%
1846	613	−0.33%
1872	713	+0.58%
1901	688	−0.12%
1921	531	−1.29%
1936	466	−0.87%
1946	411	−1.25%
1954	366	−1.44%
1962	347	−0.66%

Year	Pop.	±% p.a.
1968	339	−0.39%
1975	311	−1.22%
1982	307	−0.18%
1990	327	+0.79%
1999	307	−0.70%
2007	325	+0.71%
2012	353	+1.67%
2017	325	−1.64%
2023	313	−0.63%

Source: EHESS and INSEE

== Culture and heritage ==
=== Civil heritage ===
The commune has a number of buildings and structures that are registered as historical monuments:

- The Chateau du Plessis (1497). The Chateau has one item that is registered as an historical object:
  - A half-plane relief: pregnant woman (Middle Ages)
- The Chateau d'Issards (15th century). The chateau has an old part (the tower and attached main staircase) dating from the end of the 15th century and a part built between 1862 and 1870 by the architect Jean Moreau (1828-1899) for Count Louis Gabriel Carré d'Aligny.
- The Rouche Coupée Farm (19th century)
- A Farmhouse (19th century)
- The Champ Bouca Farm (18th century)
- The Amorins Farm (17th century)
- A House at La Loge (19th century)
- The Ecalits Farm (15th century)
- The Jalière Farm (1780)
- The Vilban Mill (18th century)
- Houses and Farms (15th - 19th centuries)
- The Plessis Farm (1497)
- The Croix Fromenteau Farm (19th century)
- The Benêts Farm (19th century)
- The Villard Farm (18th century)
- The Chateau de La Trolière (15th century). The Chateau contains one item that is registered as an historical object:
  - A Roof Ornament depicting a pigeon (18th century)
- Boucheron Manor (15th century)
- Petit Bigut Manor (15th century)
- Ardennes Manor (1623)

=== Religious heritage ===
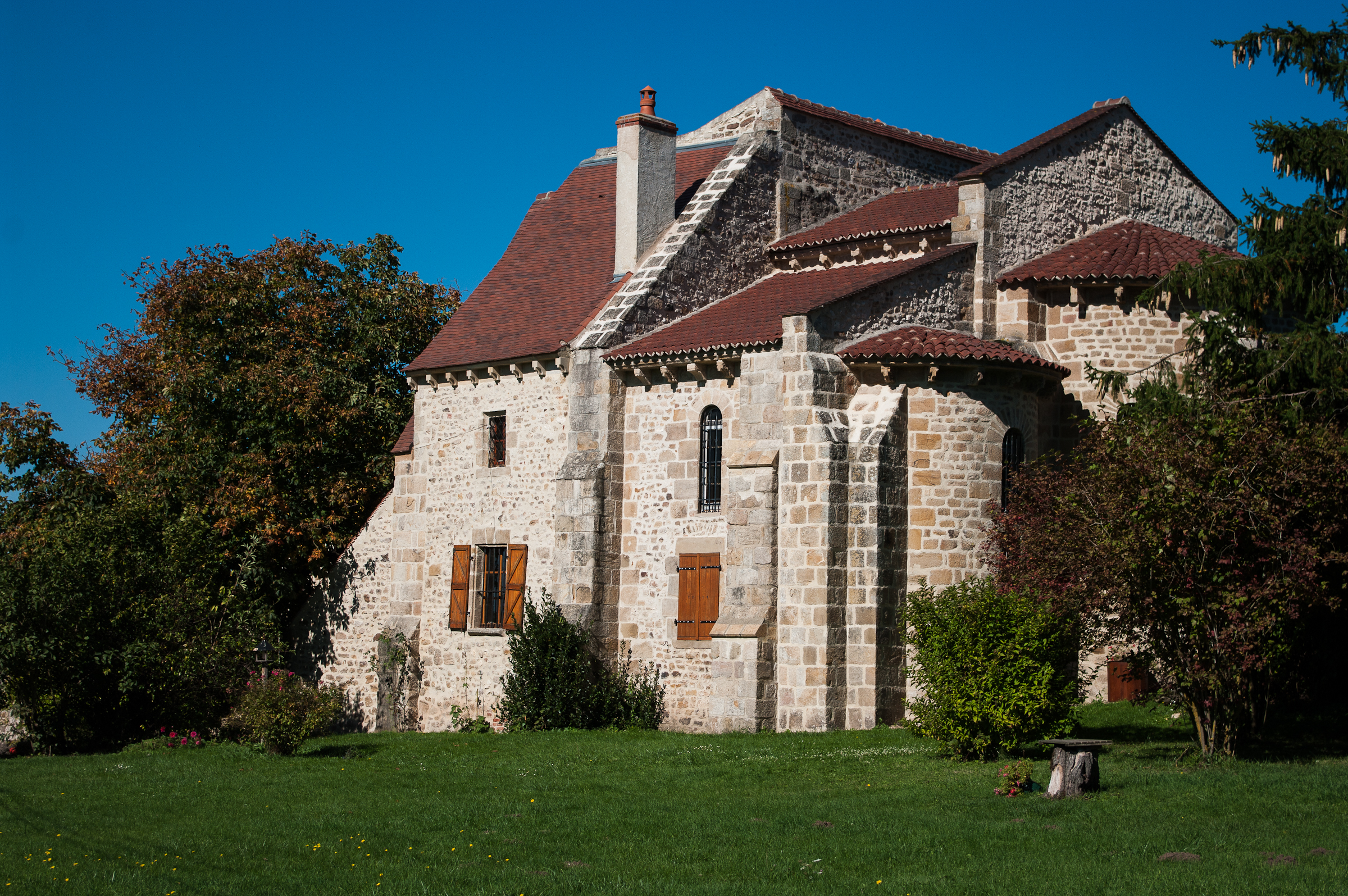
The old Benedictine Priory

The commune has many religious buildings and structures that are registered as historical monuments:

- The old Benedictine Priory of Saint-Maurice(13th century). The Priory contains three items that are registered as historical objects:
  - A Sculpture: Bust of Saint-Auréolé (11th century)
  - 3 decorative plaques: Adam and Eve seated (11th century)
  - 2 Statues: Virgin and Child and Saint-Cyriaque (disappeared) (12th century)

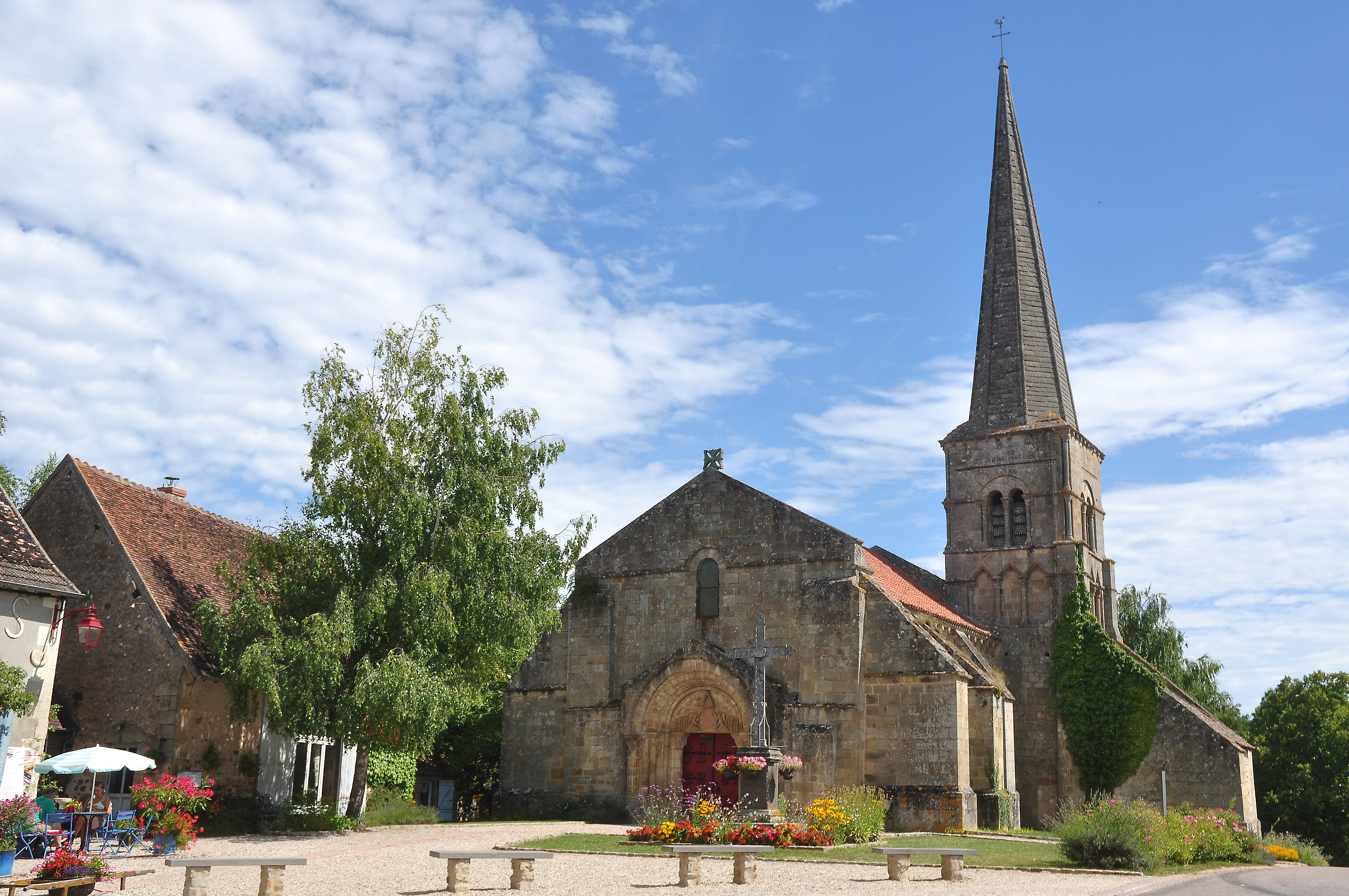
The Church of the Trinity

- The Church of the Trinity (11th century) The Church of the Holy Trinity is a Romanesque church which dates from the early 12th century which has a magnificent portal and a carved tympanum and bell tower. It is typical of the Middle Ages (a long, low building with repeated use of the tapering lintel) with decorative influences from Cluny Abbey (especially fluted pilasters) combined. The decor of the portal (fluted pilasters and tangled foliage) is strongly reminiscent of some decorative elements of the Abbey at Chezal-Benoît (Cher) which was built in the first half of the 12th century. The steeple topped by its stone spire is one of the highest in the department. The Tympanum has two angels holding a Mandorla which surrounds Christ in glory which is also found in the nearby church of Meillers. This is a very rare instance of the artist signing his work: "Natalis me fecit". They are surrounded by arched ways with hanging lamps.

The church contains many items that are registered as historical monuments:

- A Bronze Bell (1694)
- A Bronze Bell (1656)
- A Plaque commemorating the foundation of Masses by Jacques de Dreuille and Elisabeth Deculant, his wife (1715)
- A Painting: Deposition of the Cross (16th century)
- Group of 4 Capitals and bases (11th century)
- A Statue: Christ in Majesty (13th century)
- Group of 4 Capitals (12th century)
- Group of 3 Capitals (12th century)
- Group of 6 Capitals (12th century)
- A Lintel: Christ Pantocrator or in Majesty (12th century)
- A Painting: Lamentation on the dead Christ (15th century)
- A Retable built into a niche (17th century)
- A Processional Cross (19th century)
- A Statue: Saint Roche (19th century)
- A Statue: presumed to be Saint Abdon (19th century)
- A Statue: Virgin and Child (18th century)
- A Statue: Virgin and Child (17th century)
- A Stained glass window roundel of Mgr. de Dreux-Brézé (19th century)
- 4 decorative and 2 historical Stained glass windows (1869)
- 2 historical Stained glass windows (1861)
- 3 Stained glass windows of people (1854)
- A Bronze Bell (1836)
- A Bronze Bell (1694)
- The Furniture in the Church of the Trinity (1836)
- 7 Capitals, 5 bases, and a cornice (11th century)

Gallery of Pictures of the Church of the Trinity

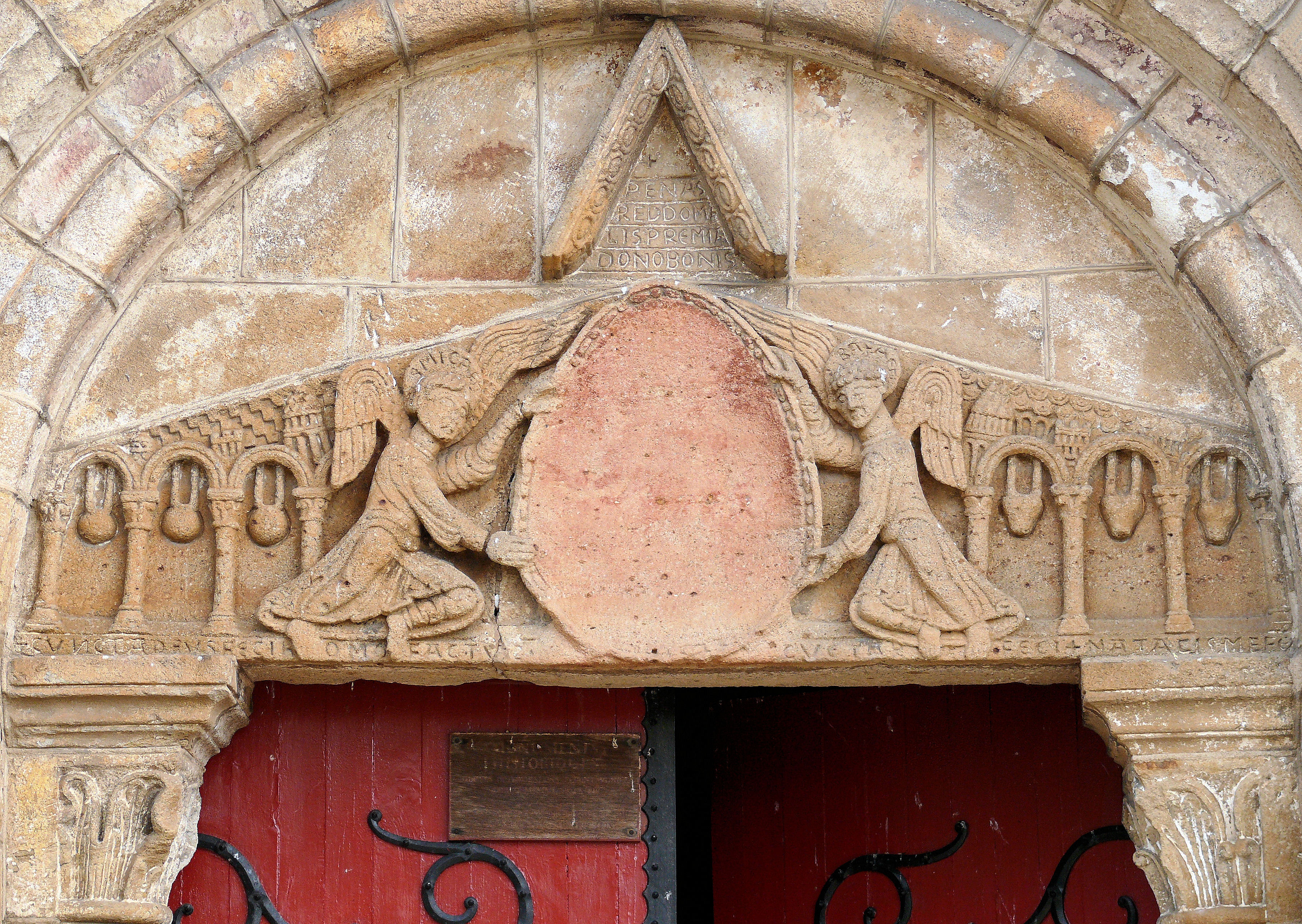
The Tympanum over the entrance

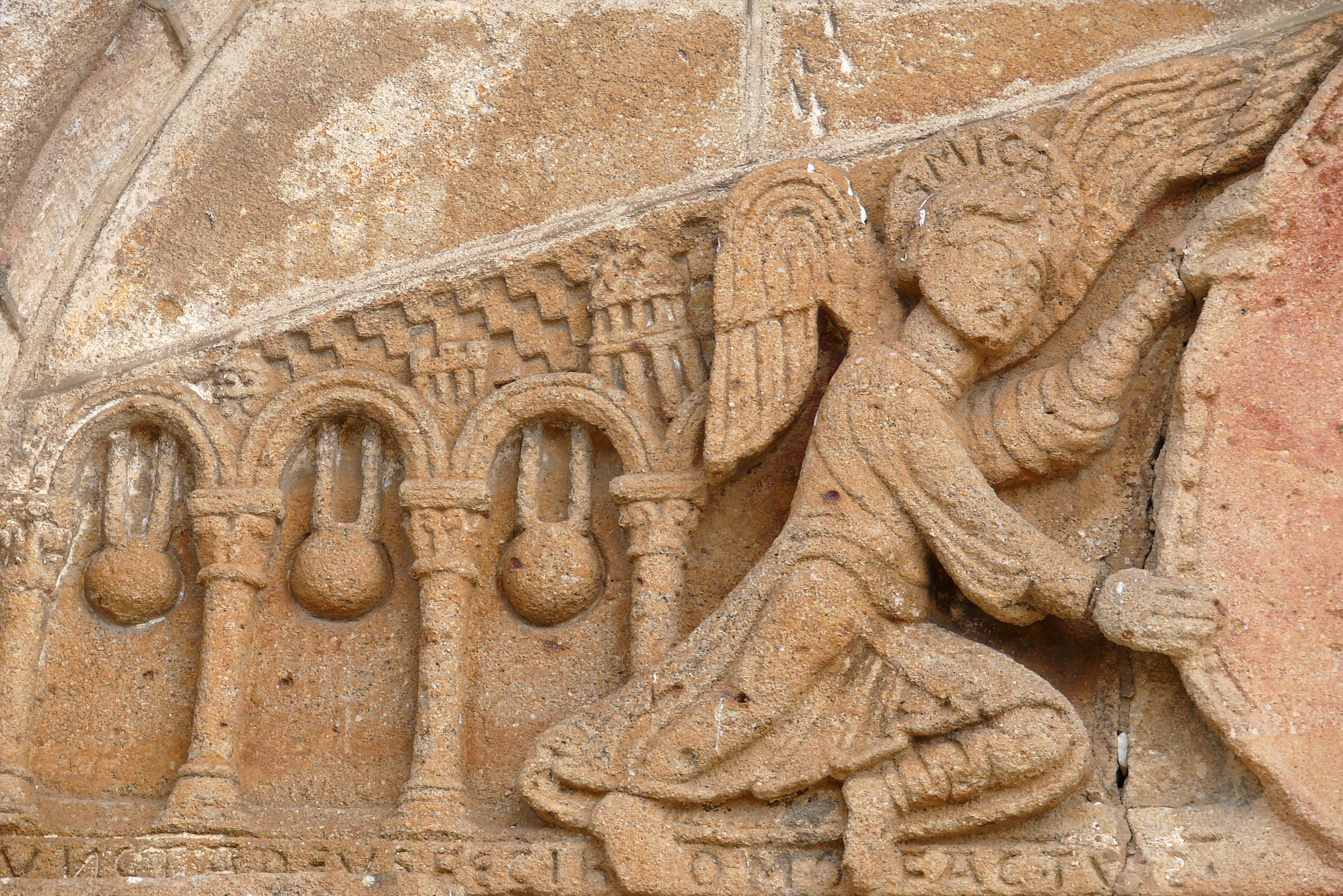
A detail of the Tympanum showing St. Michel holding the Mandorla

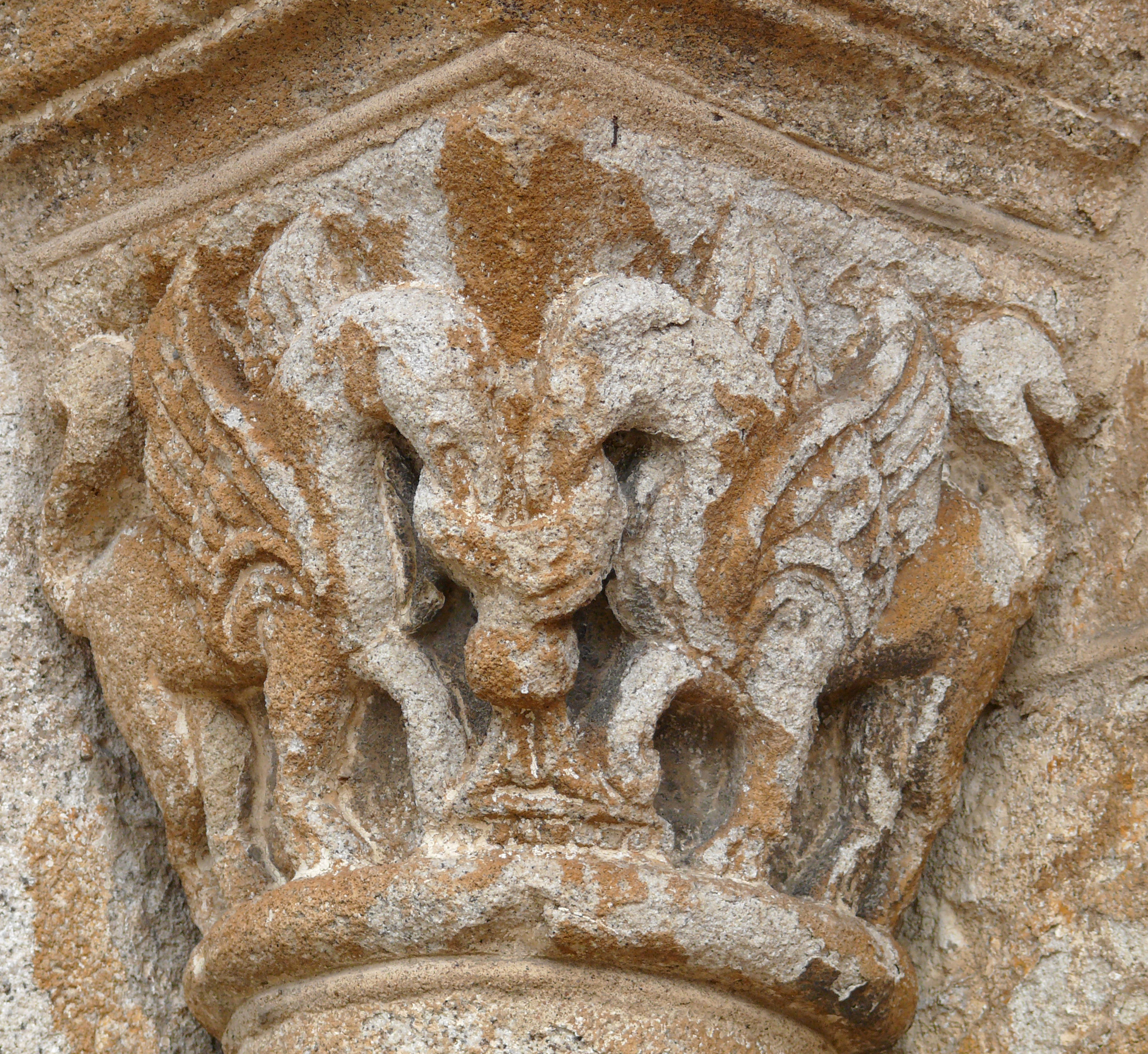
Detail of a Capital

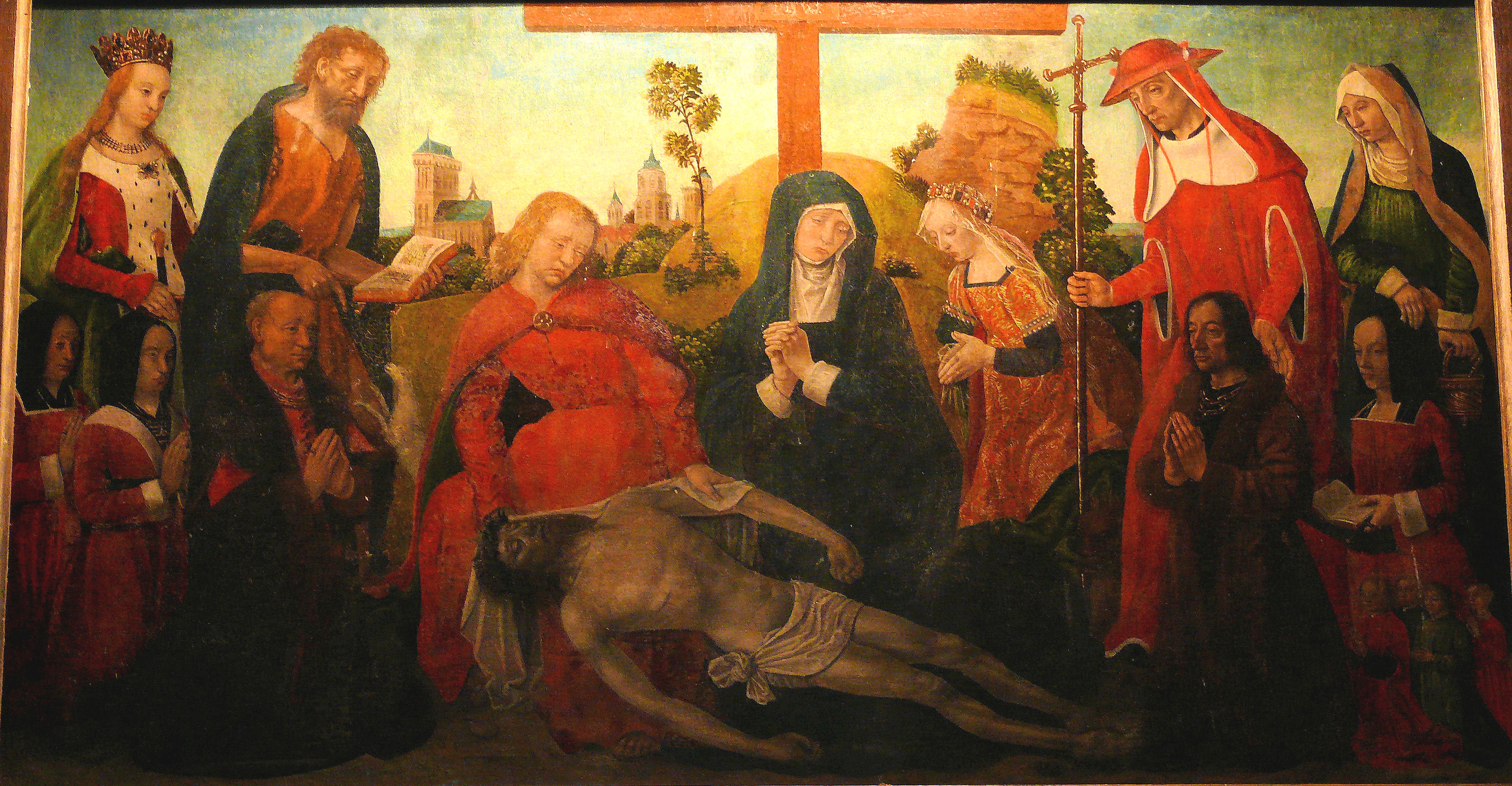
Painting: Deposition of the Cross

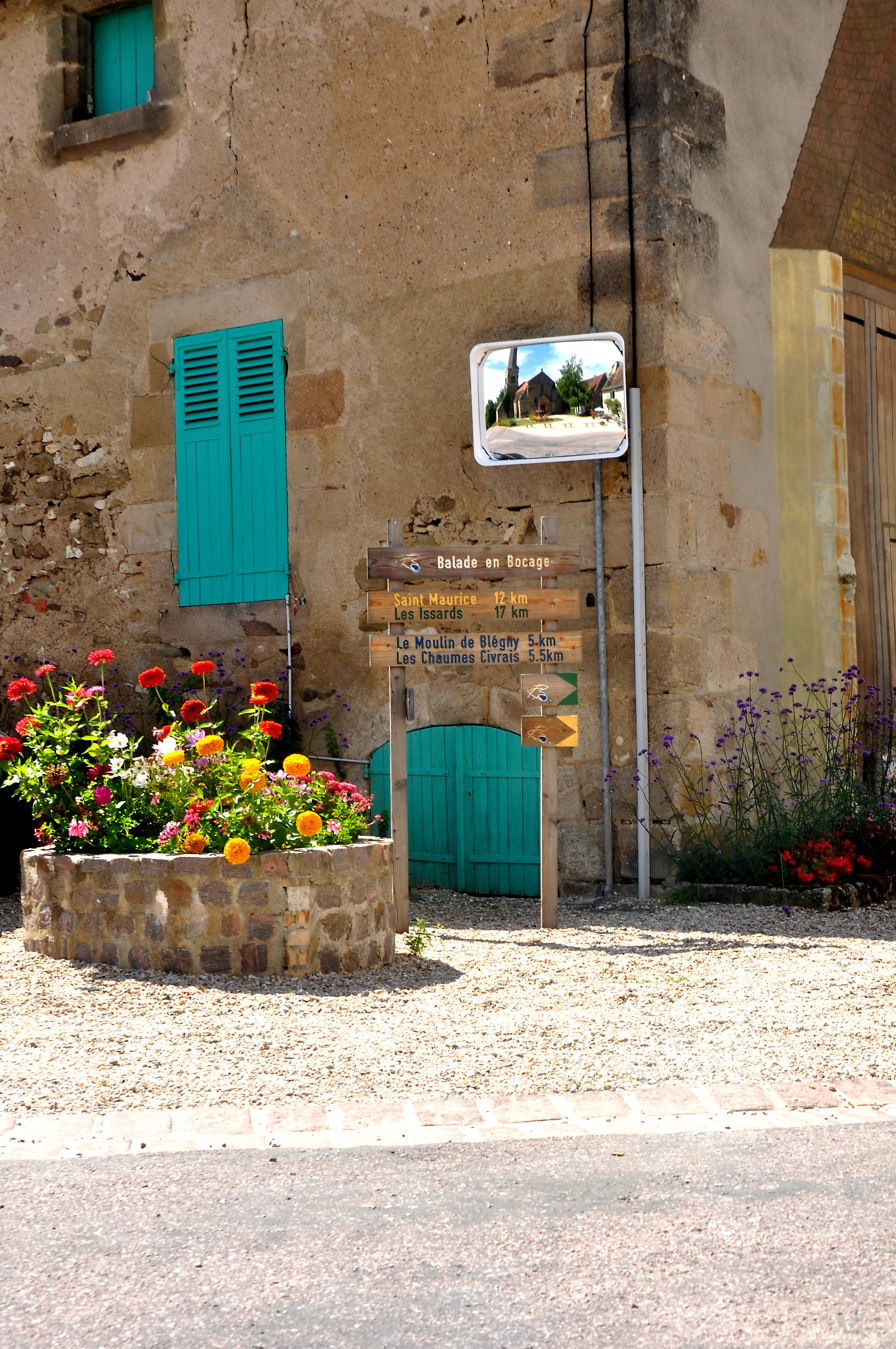
The old path for the Priest

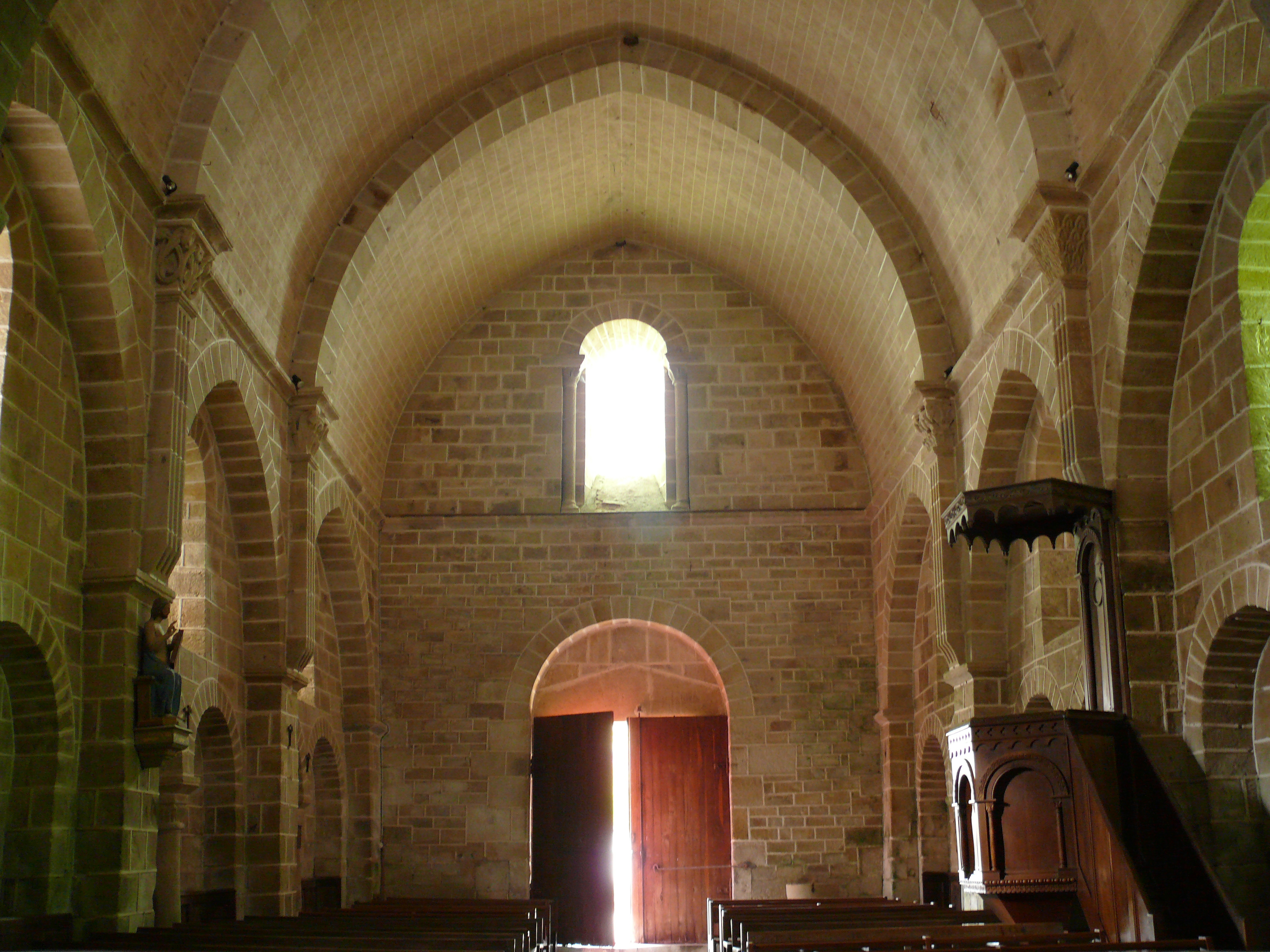
The Nave

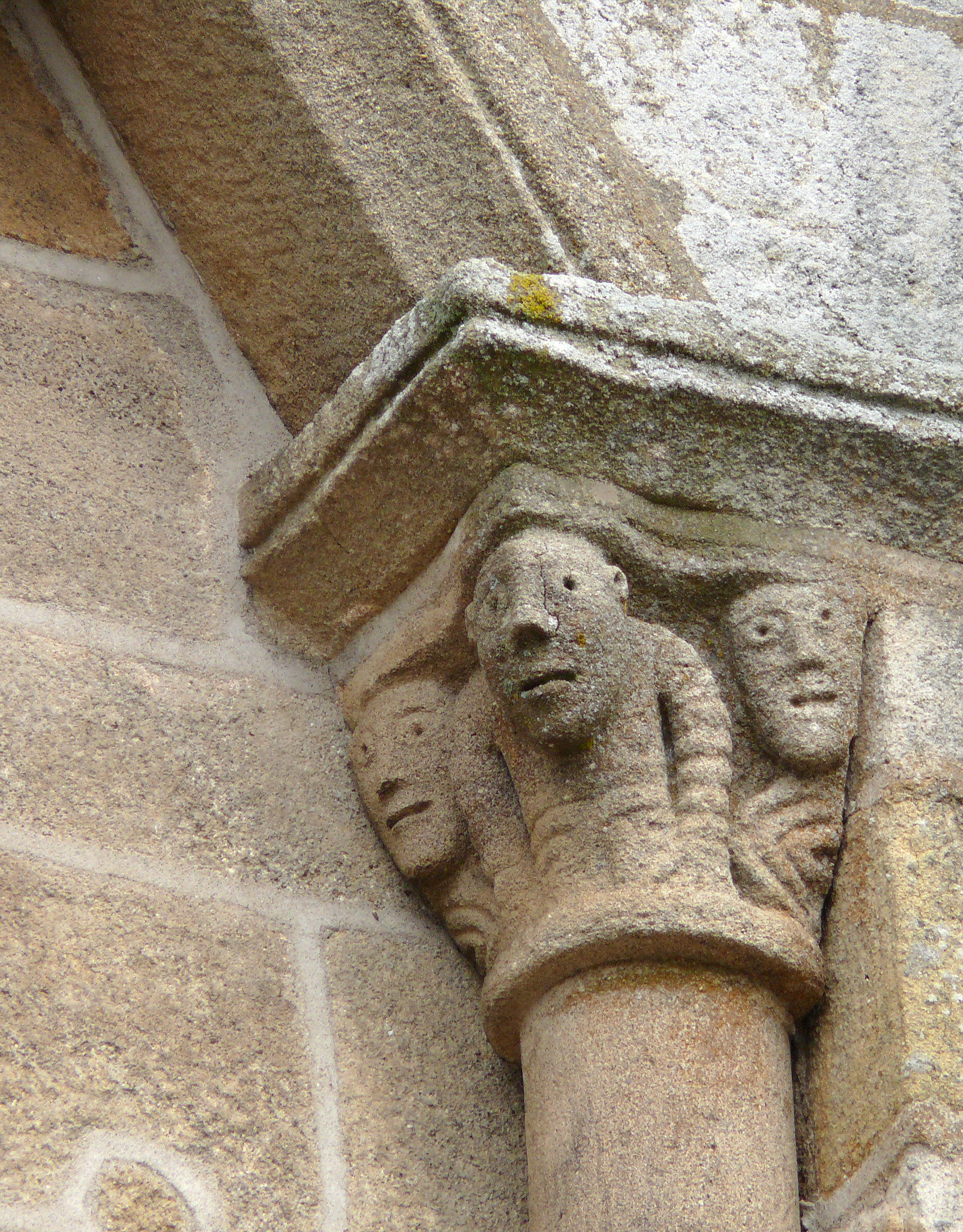
Detail on a Capital

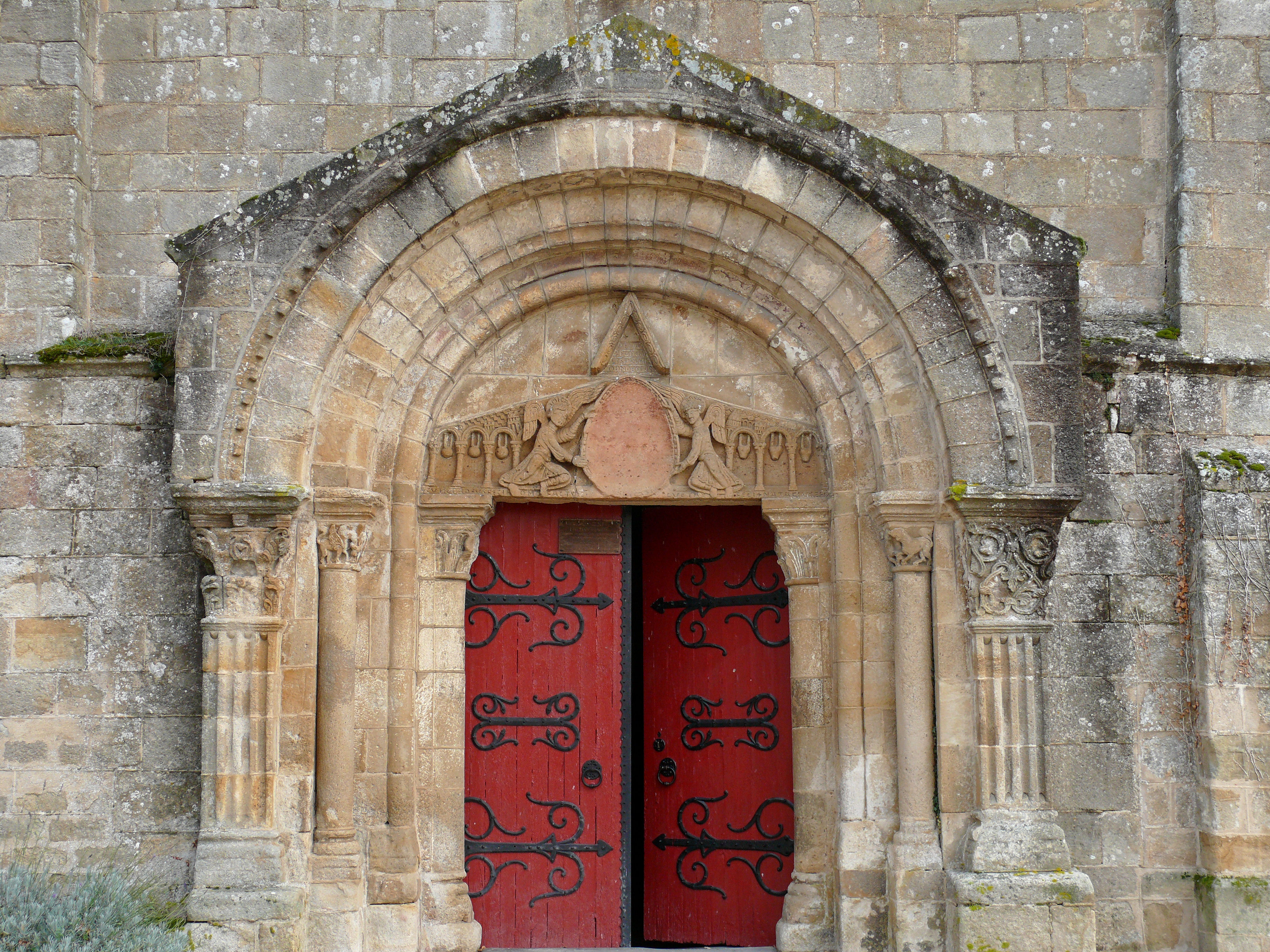
Entrance to the church

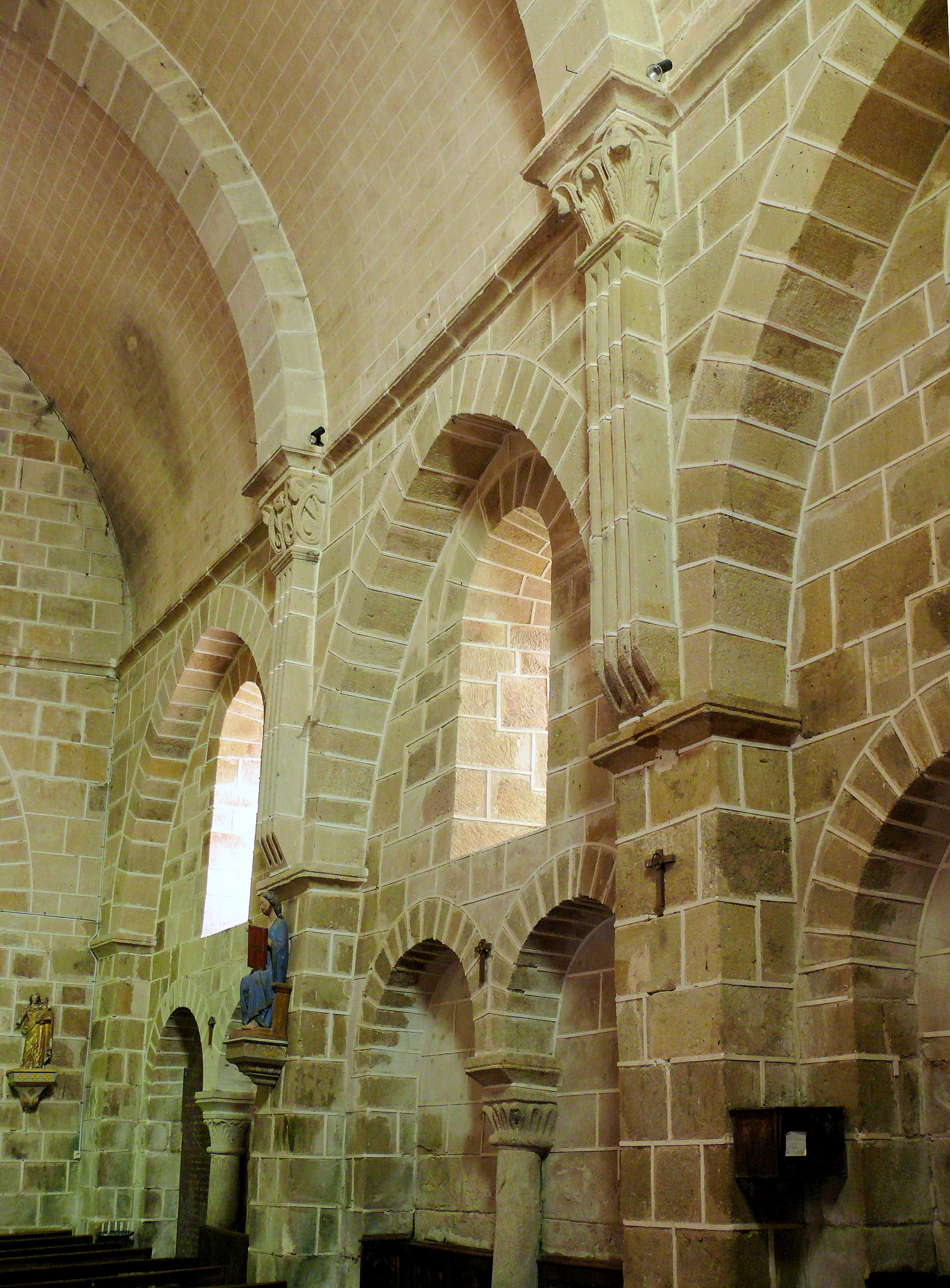
The Vault above the nave

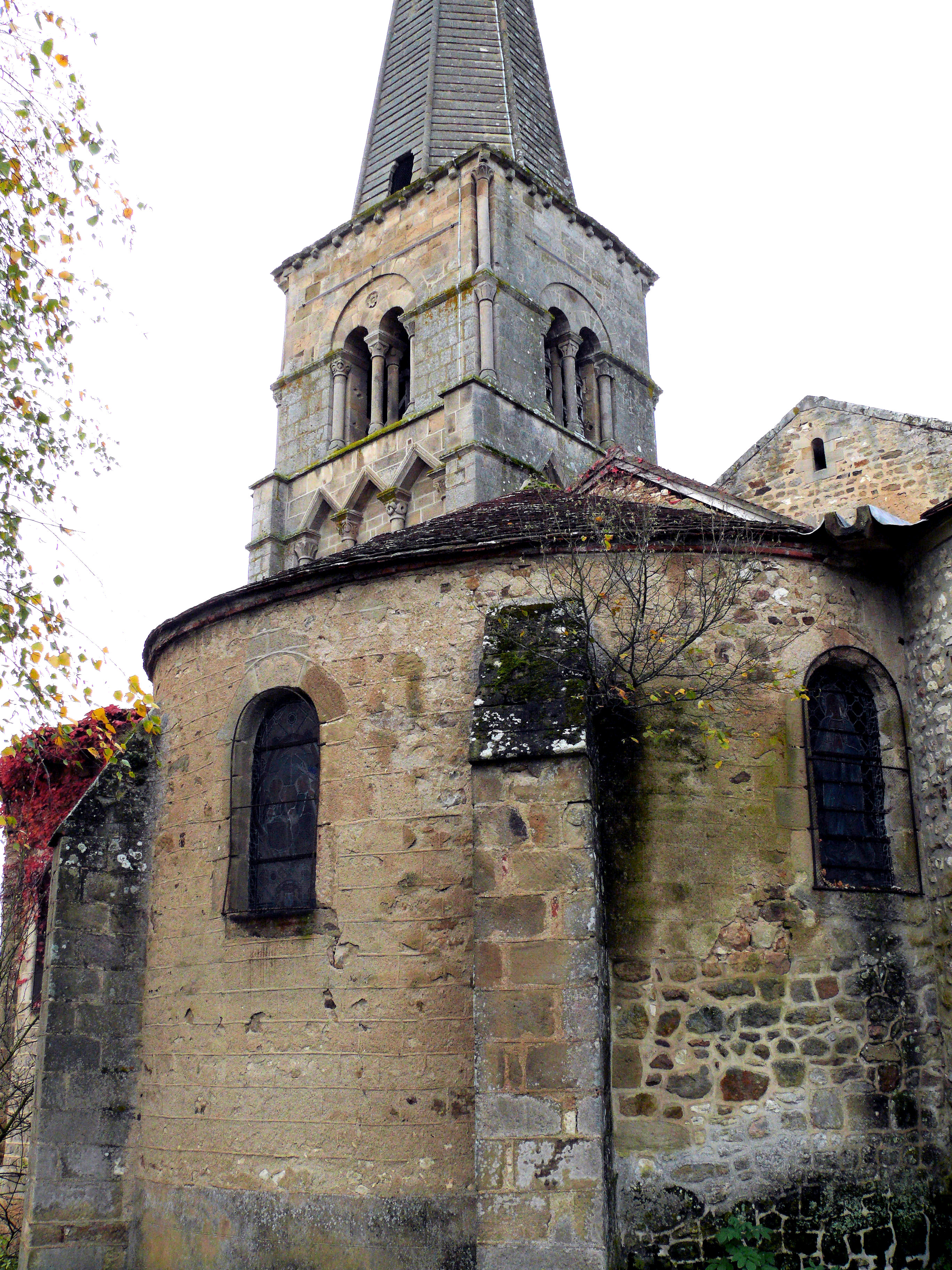
The Chevet of the church

== Notable people linked to the commune ==
- Pierre Lacorne, notary, born in 1940 at Autry-Issards and President of ASF France Aviation Sans Frontières.
- Christian Chalmin, publisher, born in 1947 at Autry-Issards and Mayor of the commune from 1989 to 1995.
- Sanne Spangenberg, French/Dutch born at Moulins in 1993, elected Miss Auvergne 2012 at 19 years old. She participated in Miss France 2013 on 8 December 2012 in live coverage on TF1 TV station.

== See also ==
- Communes of the Allier department
