= Arrondissement of Moulins =

Coordinates: 46°33′58″N 3°19′42″E

Moulins
- Arrondissement
- Location within the department Allier
- Country: France
- Region: Auvergne-Rhône-Alpes
- Department: Allier
- No. of communes: {{{nbcomm}}}
- Area: 2,016.9 km^{2} (778.7 sq mi)
- Population (2023): 76,068
  - Density: 37.715/km^{2} (97.682/sq mi)
- INSEE code: 032

The arrondissement of Moulins is an arrondissement of France in the Allier department in the Auvergne-Rhône-Alpes region. It has 67 communes. Its population is 76,316 (2021), and its area is 2,016.9 km^{2} (778.7 sq mi).

== Composition ==
The communes of the arrondissement of Moulins, and their INSEE codes, are:

1. Agonges (03002)
2. Aubigny (03009)
3. Aurouër (03011)
4. Autry-Issards (03012)
5. Avermes (03013)
6. Bagneux (03015)
7. Bessay-sur-Allier (03025)
8. Besson (03026)
9. Bourbon-l'Archambault (03036)
10. Bresnay (03039)
11. Bressolles (03040)
12. Buxières-les-Mines (03046)
13. Chapeau (03054)
14. La Chapelle-aux-Chasses (03057)
15. Château-sur-Allier (03064)
16. Châtel-de-Neuvre (03065)
17. Châtillon (03069)
18. Chemilly (03073)
19. Chevagnes (03074)
20. Chézy (03076)
21. Coulandon (03085)
22. Couzon (03090)
23. Cressanges (03092)
24. Deux-Chaises (03099)
25. Franchesse (03117)
26. Gannay-sur-Loire (03119)
27. Garnat-sur-Engièvre (03120)
28. Gennetines (03121)
29. Gipcy (03122)
30. Gouise (03124)
31. Limoise (03146)
32. Louroux-Bourbonnais (03150)
33. Lurcy-Lévis (03155)
34. Lusigny (03156)
35. Marigny (03162)
36. Meillard (03169)
37. Meillers (03170)
38. Montbeugny (03180)
39. Le Montet (03183)
40. Montilly (03184)
41. Moulins (03190)
42. Neuilly-le-Réal (03197)
43. Neure (03198)
44. Neuvy (03200)
45. Noyant-d'Allier (03202)
46. Paray-le-Frésil (03203)
47. Pouzy-Mésangy (03210)
48. Rocles (03214)
49. Saint-Aubin-le-Monial (03218)
50. Saint-Ennemond (03229)
51. Saint-Hilaire (03238)
52. Saint-Léopardin-d'Augy (03241)
53. Saint-Martin-des-Lais (03245)
54. Saint-Menoux (03247)
55. Saint-Plaisir (03251)
56. Saint-Sornin (03260)
57. Souvigny (03275)
58. Thiel-sur-Acolin (03283)
59. Toulon-sur-Allier (03286)
60. Treban (03287)
61. Trévol (03290)
62. Tronget (03292)
63. Le Veurdre (03309)
64. Vieure (03312)
65. Villeneuve-sur-Allier (03316)
66. Ygrande (03320)
67. Yzeure (03321)

== History ==
The arrondissement of Moulins was created in 1800. At the January 2017 reorganization of the arrondissements of Allier, it lost three communes to the arrondissement of Vichy and gained one commune from the arrondissement of Vichy. At the January 2024 reorganization of the arrondissements of Allier, it lost 41 communes to the arrondissement of Vichy and two to the arrondissement of Montluçon, and it gained one from the arrondissement of Montluçon.

As a result of the reorganisation of the cantons of France which came into effect in 2015, the borders of the cantons are no longer related to the borders of the arrondissements. The cantons of the arrondissement of Moulins were, as of January 2015:

1. Bourbon-l'Archambault
2. Chantelle
3. Chevagnes
4. Dompierre-sur-Besbre
5. Lurcy-Lévis
6. Le Montet
7. Moulins-Ouest
8. Moulins-Sud
9. Neuilly-le-Réal
10. Saint-Pourçain-sur-Sioule
11. Souvigny
12. Yzeure
