= Communauté de communes du Bocage Bourbonnais =

Bocage Bourbonnais
- Communauté de communes
- Country: France
- Region: Auvergne-Rhône-Alpes
- Department: Allier
- No. of communes: {{{nbcomm}}}
- Established: 1 January 2017

Government
  - President: Jean-Marc Dumont (PCF)
- Area: 735.70 km^{2} (284.06 sq mi)
- Population (2023): 13,580
  - Density: 18.46/km^{2} (47.81/sq mi)

The communauté de communes du Bocage Bourbonnais is a communauté de communes, located in the Allier department of the Auvergne-Rhône-Alpes region of France. Created in 2017, its seat is in Bourbon-l'Archambault. Its area is 735.7 km^{2}, and its population was 13,705 in 2020.

== Communal territory ==
=== Composition ===
The communauté de communes is composed of the 25 following communes:

List of communes of the communauté de communes du Bocage Bourbonnais
Commune	INSEE code	Demonym	Area (km^{2})	Population (2019)	Density (per km^{2})
Bourbon-l'Archambault (seat)	03036	Bourbonnais	54.84	2,572	47
Agonges	03002	Agongeois	24.1	309	13
Autry-Issards	03012	Issardiens	19.45	323	17
Buxières-les-Mines	03046	Buxiérois	46.95	1,026	22
Châtel-de-Neuvre	03065	Casteldeneuvrois	19.34	544	28
Châtillon	03069	Châtillonnais	12.9	312	24
Cressanges	03092	Cressangeois	41.76	628	15
Deux-Chaises	03099	Deux-Chaisois	41.01	391	9.5
Franchesse	03117	Franchessois	40.24	475	12
Gipcy	03122	Gipcycrois	27.57	236	8.6
Louroux-Bourbonnais	03150	Lourouziens Bourbonnais	33.02	203	6.1
Meillard	03169		25.48	331	13
Meillers	03170	Meillerois	23.48	129	5.5
Le Montet	03183	Montetois	1.77	469	265
Noyant-d'Allier	03202	Noyantais	21.05	603	29
Rocles	03214	Roclais	21.66	382	18
Saint-Aubin-le-Monial	03218	Saint-Aubinois	21.63	272	13
Saint-Hilaire	03238	Saint-Hilairois	20.64	529	26
Saint-Menoux	03247	Ménulphiens	27.62	1,106	40
Saint-Plaisir	03251	Saint-Plaisirois	52.54	376	7.2
Saint-Sornin	03260	Saint-Sorninois	19.44	224	12
Treban	03287	Trébanais	25.63	379	15
Tronget	03292	Trongétois	31.06	879	28
Vieure	03312	Vieurois	29.81	274	9.2
Ygrande	03320	Ygrandais	52.71	776	15

=== Demographics ===
Historical population
Year	Pop.	±% p.a.
1968	18,769	—
1975	16,251	−2.04%
1982	15,575	−0.61%
1990	14,787	−0.65%
1999	14,156	−0.48%
2007	13,894	−0.23%
2012	14,052	+0.23%
2017	13,769	−0.41%
2023	13,580	−0.23%
Source: INSEE

== Administration ==
=== Seat ===
The seat of the communauté de communes is located in Bourbon-l'Archambault.

=== Presidency ===
List of successive presidents of the communauté de communes du Bocage Bourbonnais
In office		Name	Party	Capacity	Ref.
1 January 2017	August 2017	Jean-Paul Dufrègne	PCF	Municipal councilor for Saint-Menoux (2008-2020); General then departmental councilor of the canton of Souvigny (since 1998); Deputy from Allier's 1st constituency (2017-2022); Former president of the Communauté de communes en Bocage Bourbonnais (2014-2016)	
August 2017	Incumbent	Jean-Marc Dumont	PCF	Mayor of Tronget (since 2017)	

== See also ==
- List of intercommunalities of the Allier department
