= Canton of Moulins-Sud =

Coordinates: 46°33′55″N 3°20′00″E

Moulins-Sud
- Former canton
- Interactive map of Moulins-Sud
- Country: France
- Region: Auvergne-Rhône-Alpes
- Department: Allier
- No. of communes: {{{nbcomm}}}
- Disbanded: 2015
- Population (2012): 13,021

The canton of Moulins-Sud is a former administrative division of the Arrondissement of Moulins in the Allier department in central France. It was disbanded following the French canton reorganisation which came into effect in March 2015. It had 13,021 inhabitants (2012).

The canton comprised the following communes:

- Bressolles
- Moulins (partly)
- Toulon-sur-Allier

== See also ==
- Cantons of the Allier department
