= Ygrande =

- Commune
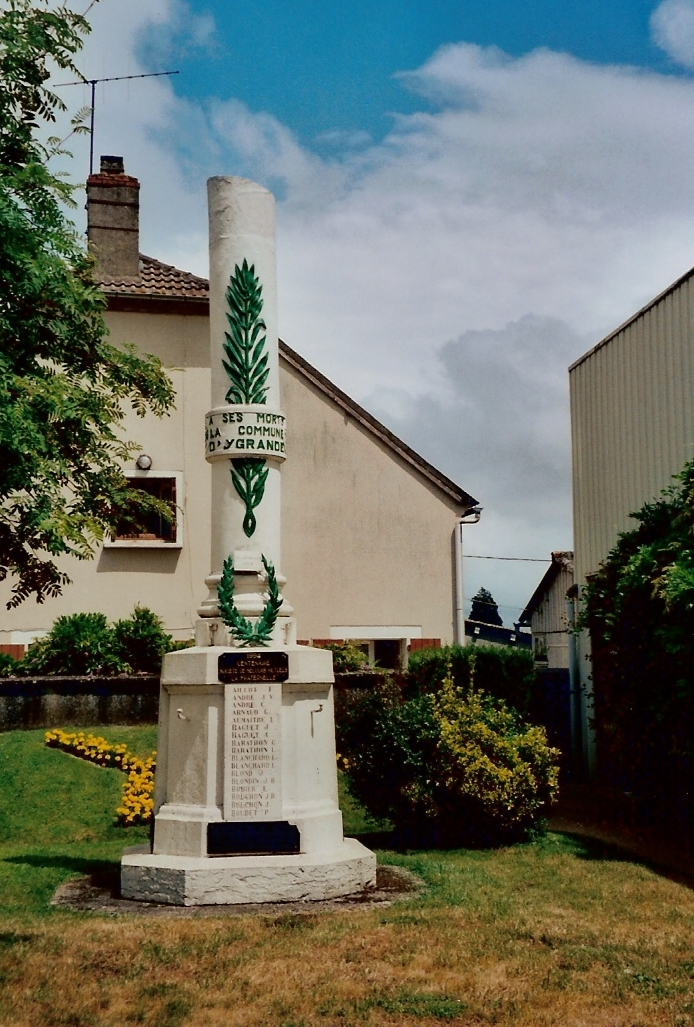
- Damaged war memorial
- Location of Ygrande
- Location within France Location within Auvergne-Rhône-Alpes
- Coordinates: 46°33′10″N 2°56′40″E
- Country: France
- Region: Auvergne-Rhône-Alpes
- Department: Allier
- Arrondissement: Moulins
- Canton: Bourbon-l'Archambault
- Intercommunality: Bocage Bourbonnais

Government
  - Mayor (2026–32): Mickaël Pommier
- Area^{1}: 52.71 km^{2} (20.35 sq mi)
- Elevation: 330 m (1,080 ft)
- Highest elevation: 344 m (1,129 ft)
- Lowest elevation: 237 m (778 ft)
- Population (2023): 762
  - Density: 14.5/km^{2} (37.4/sq mi)
- Time zone: UTC+01:00 (CET)
  - Summer (DST): UTC+02:00 (CEST)
- INSEE/Postal code: 03320 /03160
- ^{1} French Land Register data, which excludes lakes, ponds, glaciers > 1 km^{2} (0.386 sq mi or 247 acres) and river estuaries.

Ygrande (French pronunciation: [iɡʁɑ̃d]) is a commune in the Allier department in Auvergne-Rhône-Alpes in central France.

== Population ==
Historical population
Year	Pop.	±% p.a.
1968	1,094	—
1975	952	−1.97%
1982	901	−0.78%
1990	827	−1.07%
1999	781	−0.63%
2007	758	−0.37%
2012	777	+0.50%
2017	775	−0.05%
2023	762	−0.28%
Source: INSEE

== See also ==
- Communes of the Allier department
