= Saint-Aubin-le-Monial =

- Commune
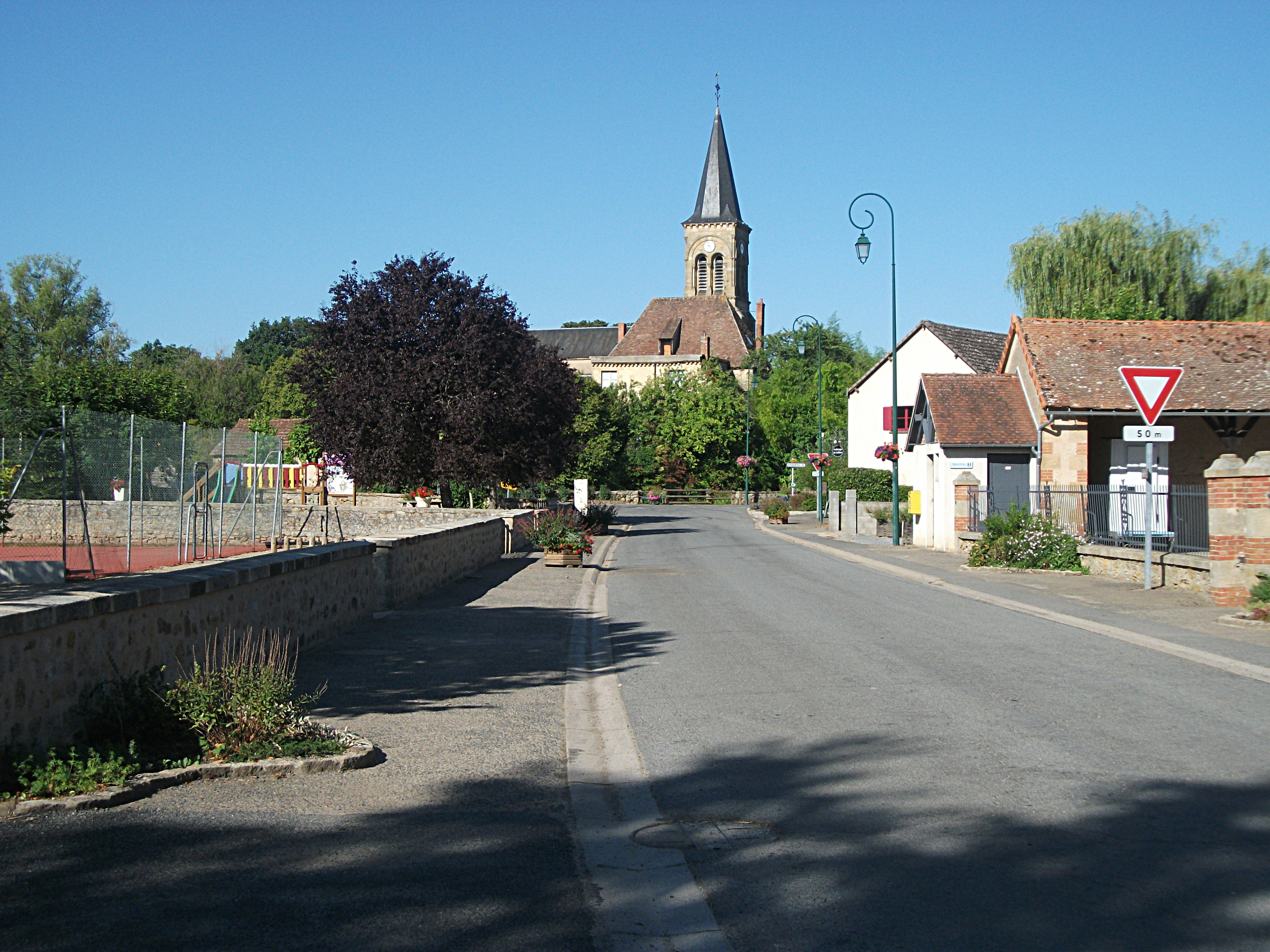
- View of Saint-Aubin-le-Monial from Rue des Écoles, and the Saint-Barnabé church in the second ground.

- Coat of arms
- Location of Saint-Aubin-le-Monial
- Location within France Location within Auvergne-Rhône-Alpes
- Coordinates: 46°31′43″N 2°59′55″E
- Country: France
- Region: Auvergne-Rhône-Alpes
- Department: Allier
- Arrondissement: Moulins
- Canton: Bourbon-l'Archambault
- Intercommunality: Bocage Bourbonnais

Government
  - Mayor (2026–32): Françoise Guilleminot
- Area^{1}: 21.63 km^{2} (8.35 sq mi)
- Elevation: 300 m (980 ft)
- Highest elevation: 331 m (1,086 ft)
- Lowest elevation: 247 m (810 ft)
- Population (2023): 262
  - Density: 12.1/km^{2} (31.4/sq mi)
- Time zone: UTC+01:00 (CET)
  - Summer (DST): UTC+02:00 (CEST)
- INSEE/Postal code: 03218 /03160
- ^{1} French Land Register data, which excludes lakes, ponds, glaciers > 1 km^{2} (0.386 sq mi or 247 acres) and river estuaries.

Saint-Aubin-le-Monial (French pronunciation: [sɛ̃.t‿obɛ̃ lə mɔnjal]) is a commune in the Allier department in Auvergne-Rhône-Alpes in central France.

== Population ==
Historical population
Year	Pop.	±% p.a.
1968	403	—
1975	295	−4.36%
1982	273	−1.10%
1990	269	−0.18%
1999	278	+0.37%
2007	291	+0.57%
2012	279	−0.84%
2017	266	−0.95%
2023	262	−0.25%
Source: INSEE

== See also ==
- Communes of the Allier department
