= Saint-Hilaire, Allier =

Commune in Auvergne-Rhône-Alpes, France

Saint-Hilaire
- Commune
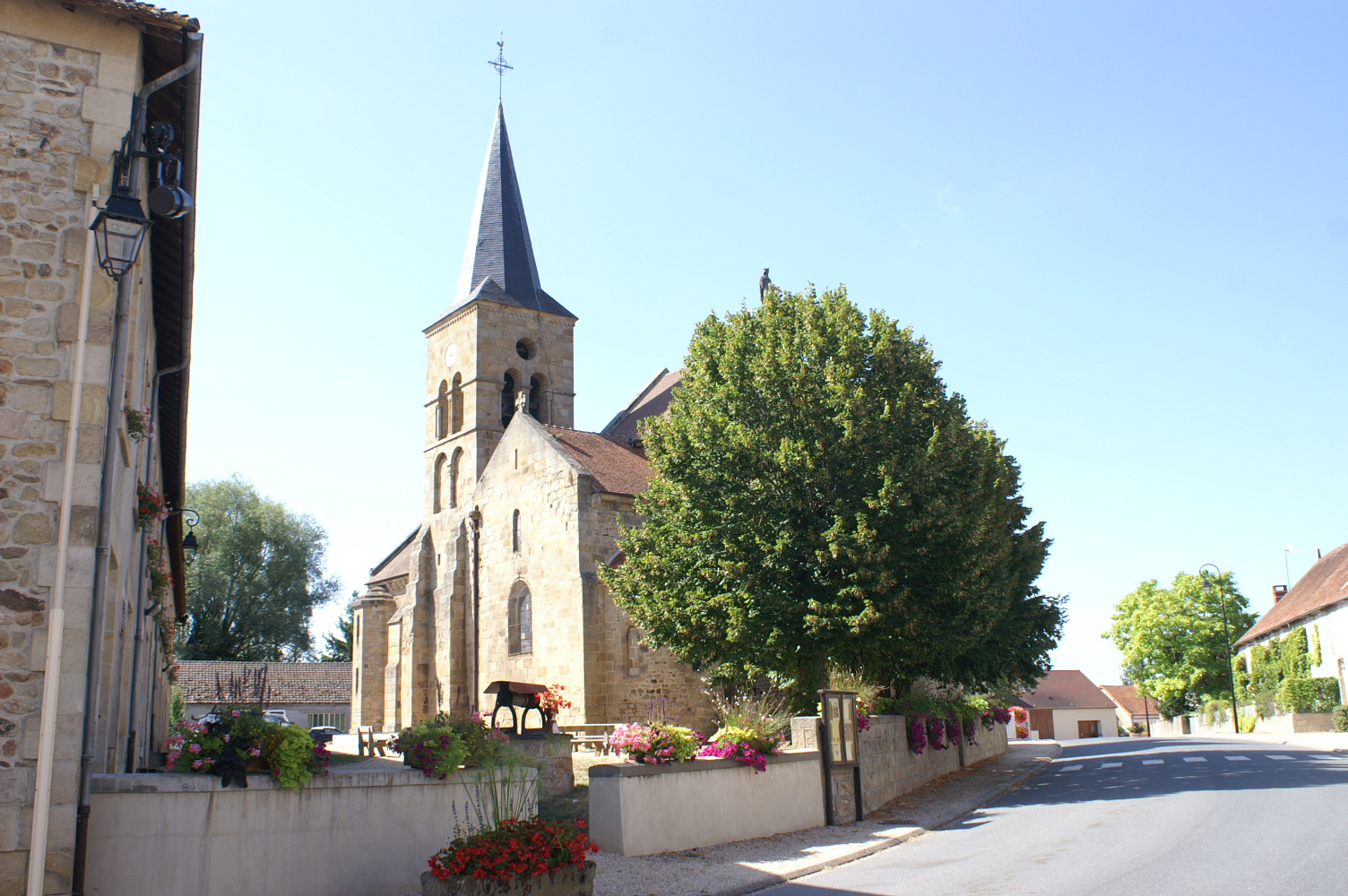
- The church in Saint-Hilaire

- Coat of arms
- Location of Saint-Hilaire
- Location within France Location within Auvergne-Rhône-Alpes
- Coordinates: 46°29′43″N 3°01′15″E
- Country: France
- Region: Auvergne-Rhône-Alpes
- Department: Allier
- Arrondissement: Moulins
- Canton: Bourbon-l'Archambault
- Intercommunality: Bocage Bourbonnais

Government
  - Mayor (2026–32): Olivier Guiot
- Area^{1}: 20.64 km^{2} (7.97 sq mi)
- Elevation: 320 m (1,050 ft)
- Highest elevation: 420 m (1,380 ft)
- Lowest elevation: 265 m (869 ft)
- Population (2023): 503
  - Density: 24.4/km^{2} (63.1/sq mi)
- Time zone: UTC+01:00 (CET)
  - Summer (DST): UTC+02:00 (CEST)
- INSEE/Postal code: 03238 /03440
- ^{1} French Land Register data, which excludes lakes, ponds, glaciers > 1 km^{2} (0.386 sq mi or 247 acres) and river estuaries.

Saint-Hilaire (French pronunciation: [sɛ̃.t‿ilɛʁ]) is a commune in the Allier department in Auvergne-Rhône-Alpes in central France.

== Population ==
Historical population
Year	Pop.	±% p.a.
1968	902	—
1975	700	−3.56%
1982	650	−1.05%
1990	595	−1.10%
1999	567	−0.53%
2007	536	−0.70%
2012	489	−1.82%
2017	543	+2.12%
2023	503	−1.27%
Source: INSEE

== See also ==
- Communes of the Allier department
