= Vieure =

- Commune
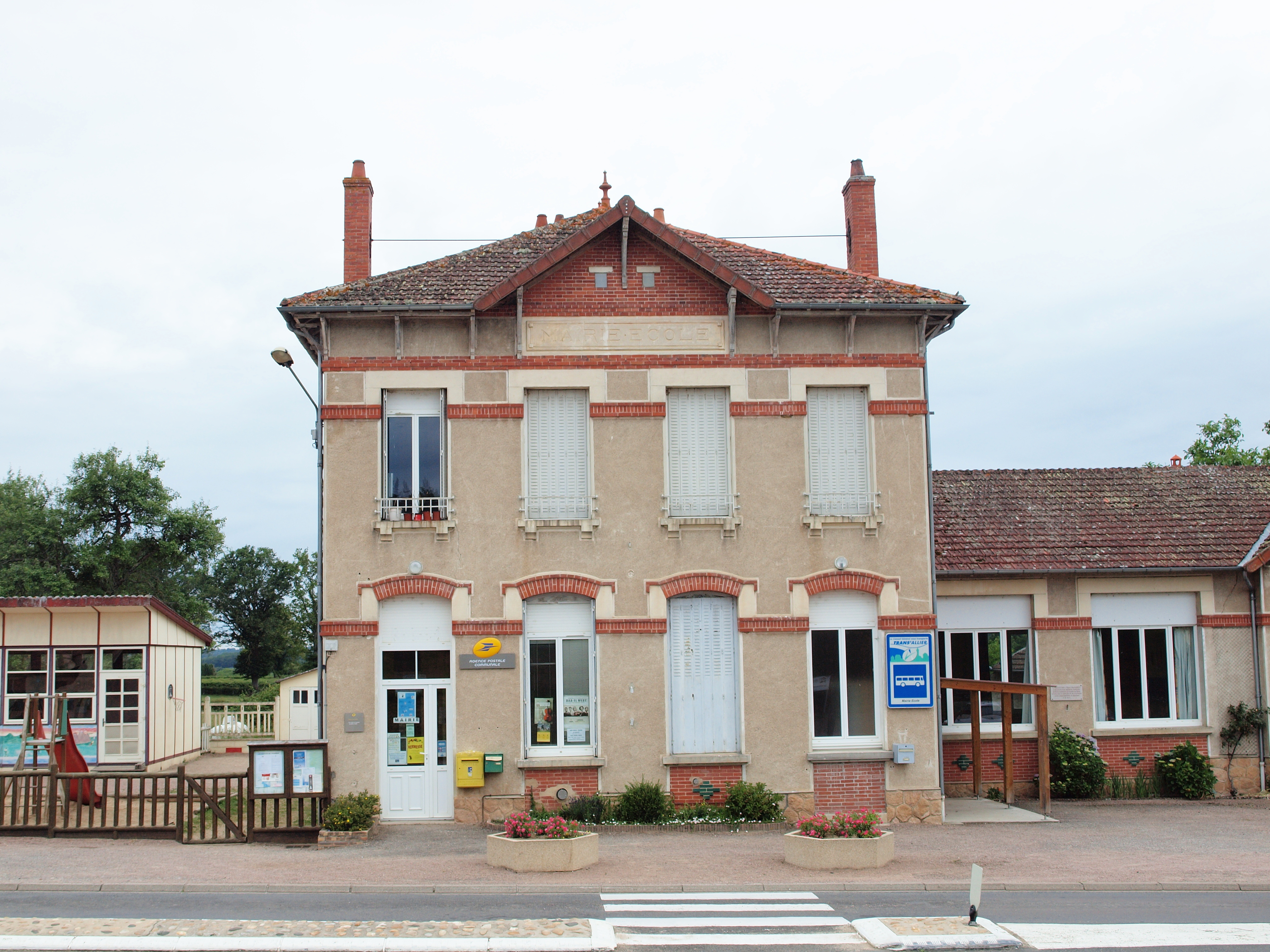
- Town hall
- Location of Vieure
- Location within France Location within Auvergne-Rhône-Alpes
- Coordinates: 46°30′07″N 2°52′36″E
- Country: France
- Region: Auvergne-Rhône-Alpes
- Department: Allier
- Arrondissement: Moulins
- Canton: Bourbon-l'Archambault
- Intercommunality: Bocage Bourbonnais

Government
  - Mayor (2026–32): Nicole Picandet
- Area^{1}: 29.81 km^{2} (11.51 sq mi)
- Elevation: 271 m (889 ft)
- Highest elevation: 304 m (997 ft)
- Lowest elevation: 222 m (728 ft)
- Population (2023): 277
  - Density: 9.29/km^{2} (24.1/sq mi)
- Time zone: UTC+01:00 (CET)
  - Summer (DST): UTC+02:00 (CEST)
- INSEE/Postal code: 03312 /03430
- ^{1} French Land Register data, which excludes lakes, ponds, glaciers > 1 km^{2} (0.386 sq mi or 247 acres) and river estuaries.

Vieure (French pronunciation: [vjœʁ]) is a commune in the Allier department in Auvergne-Rhône-Alpes in central France.

== Population ==
Historical population
Year	Pop.	±% p.a.
1968	382	—
1975	316	−2.67%
1982	288	−1.32%
1990	287	−0.04%
1999	268	−0.76%
2007	250	−0.87%
2012	274	+1.85%
2017	279	+0.36%
2023	277	−0.12%
Source: INSEE

== See also ==
- Communes of the Allier department
