= Saint-Plaisir =

- Commune
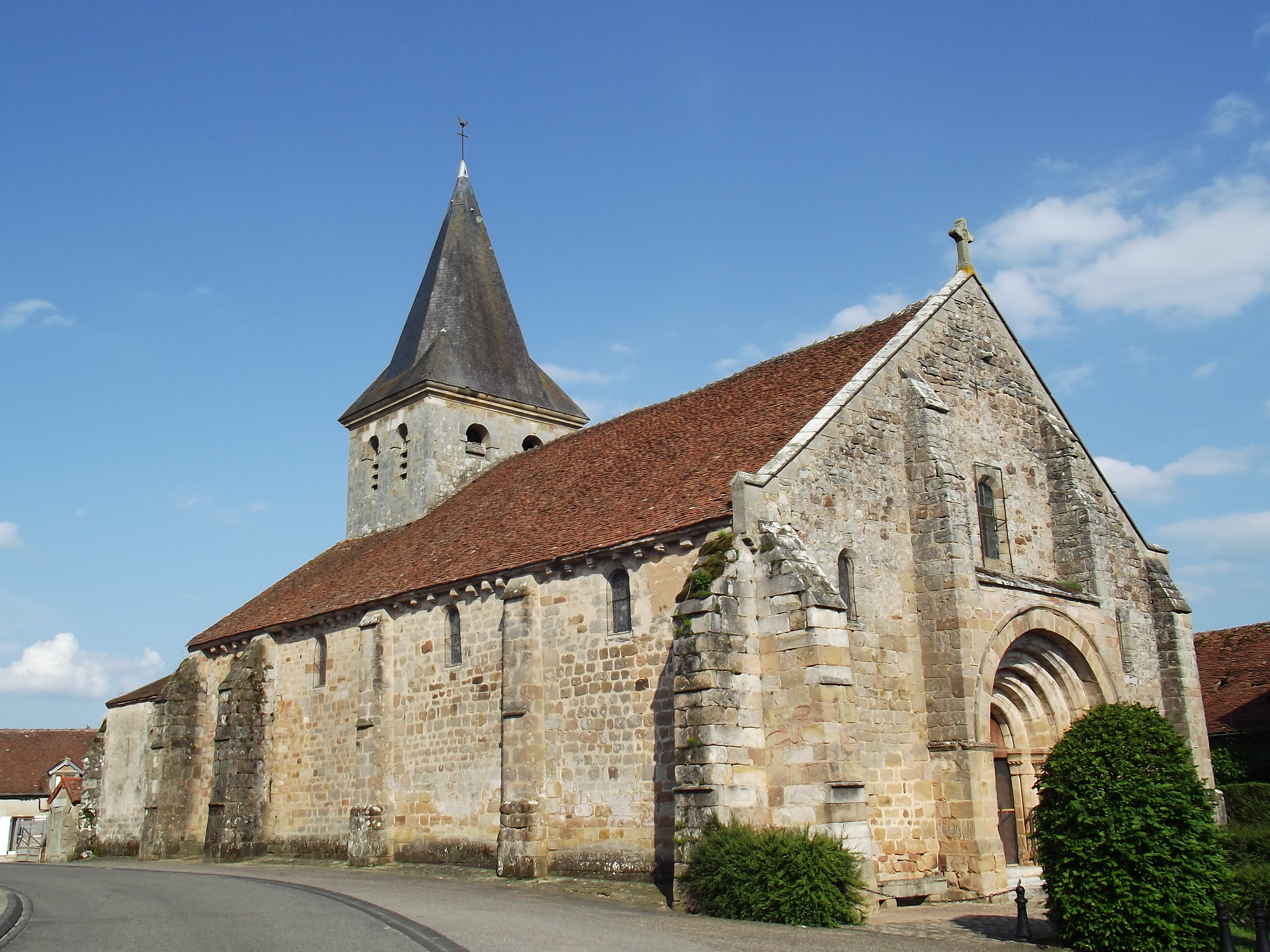
- The church in Saint-Plaisir
- Location of Saint-Plaisir
- Location within France Location within Auvergne-Rhône-Alpes
- Coordinates: 46°37′24″N 2°58′07″E
- Country: France
- Region: Auvergne-Rhône-Alpes
- Department: Allier
- Arrondissement: Moulins
- Canton: Bourbon-l'Archambault
- Intercommunality: Bocage Bourbonnais

Government
  - Mayor (2026–32): Didier Thévenoux
- Area^{1}: 52.54 km^{2} (20.29 sq mi)
- Elevation: 275 m (902 ft)
- Highest elevation: 319 m (1,047 ft)
- Lowest elevation: 207 m (679 ft)
- Population (2023): 422
  - Density: 8.03/km^{2} (20.8/sq mi)
- Time zone: UTC+01:00 (CET)
  - Summer (DST): UTC+02:00 (CEST)
- INSEE/Postal code: 03251 /03160
- ^{1} French Land Register data, which excludes lakes, ponds, glaciers > 1 km^{2} (0.386 sq mi or 247 acres) and river estuaries.

Saint-Plaisir (French pronunciation: [sɛ̃ plɛziʁ]) is a commune in the Allier department in Auvergne-Rhône-Alpes in central France.

== Population ==
Historical population
Year	Pop.	±% p.a.
1968	677	—
1975	525	−3.57%
1982	511	−0.39%
1990	388	−3.38%
1999	443	+1.48%
2007	413	−0.87%
2012	400	−0.64%
2017	379	−1.07%
2023	422	+1.81%
Source: INSEE

== See also ==
- Communes of the Allier department
