= Deux-Chaises =

- Commune
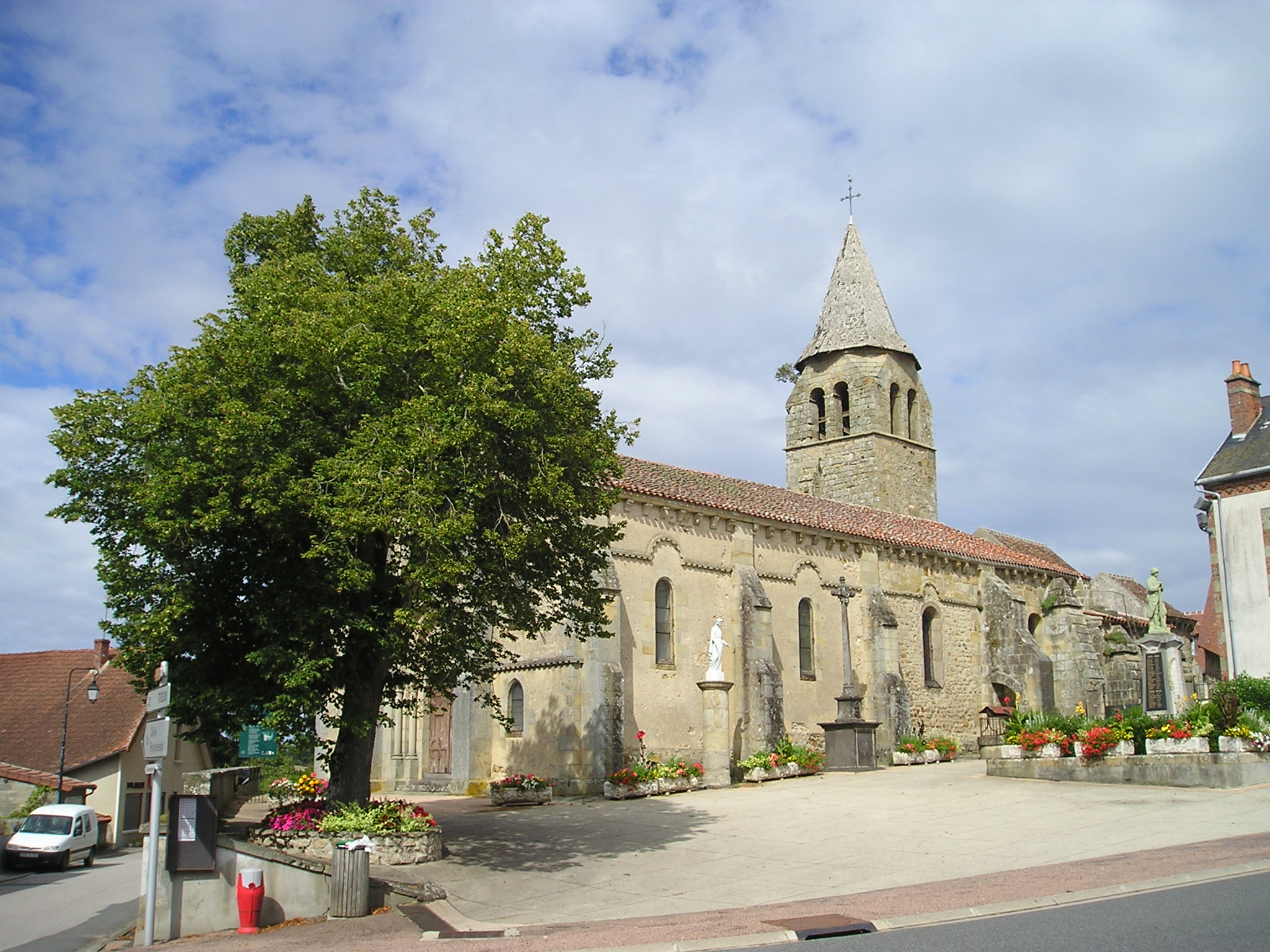
- The church in Deux-Chaises
- Location of Deux-Chaises
- Location within France Location within Auvergne-Rhône-Alpes
- Coordinates: 46°22′51″N 3°02′18″E
- Country: France
- Region: Auvergne-Rhône-Alpes
- Department: Allier
- Arrondissement: Moulins
- Canton: Souvigny
- Intercommunality: Bocage Bourbonnais

Government
  - Mayor (2026–32): Stéphanie Visinoni
- Area^{1}: 41.01 km^{2} (15.83 sq mi)
- Elevation: 503 m (1,650 ft)
- Highest elevation: 499 m (1,637 ft)
- Lowest elevation: 375 m (1,230 ft)
- Population (2023): 377
  - Density: 9.19/km^{2} (23.8/sq mi)
- Time zone: UTC+01:00 (CET)
  - Summer (DST): UTC+02:00 (CEST)
- INSEE/Postal code: 03099 /03240
- ^{1} French Land Register data, which excludes lakes, ponds, glaciers > 1 km^{2} (0.386 sq mi or 247 acres) and river estuaries.

Deux-Chaises (French pronunciation: [dø ʃɛz]; Occitan: Doas Chasas) is a commune in the Allier department in central France.

== Population ==
Historical population
Year	Pop.	±% p.a.
1968	664	—
1975	537	−2.99%
1982	501	−0.99%
1990	438	−1.67%
1999	414	−0.62%
2007	415	+0.03%
2012	408	−0.34%
2017	392	−0.80%
2023	377	−0.65%
Source: INSEE

== See also ==
- Communes of the Allier department
