= Tronget =

- Commune
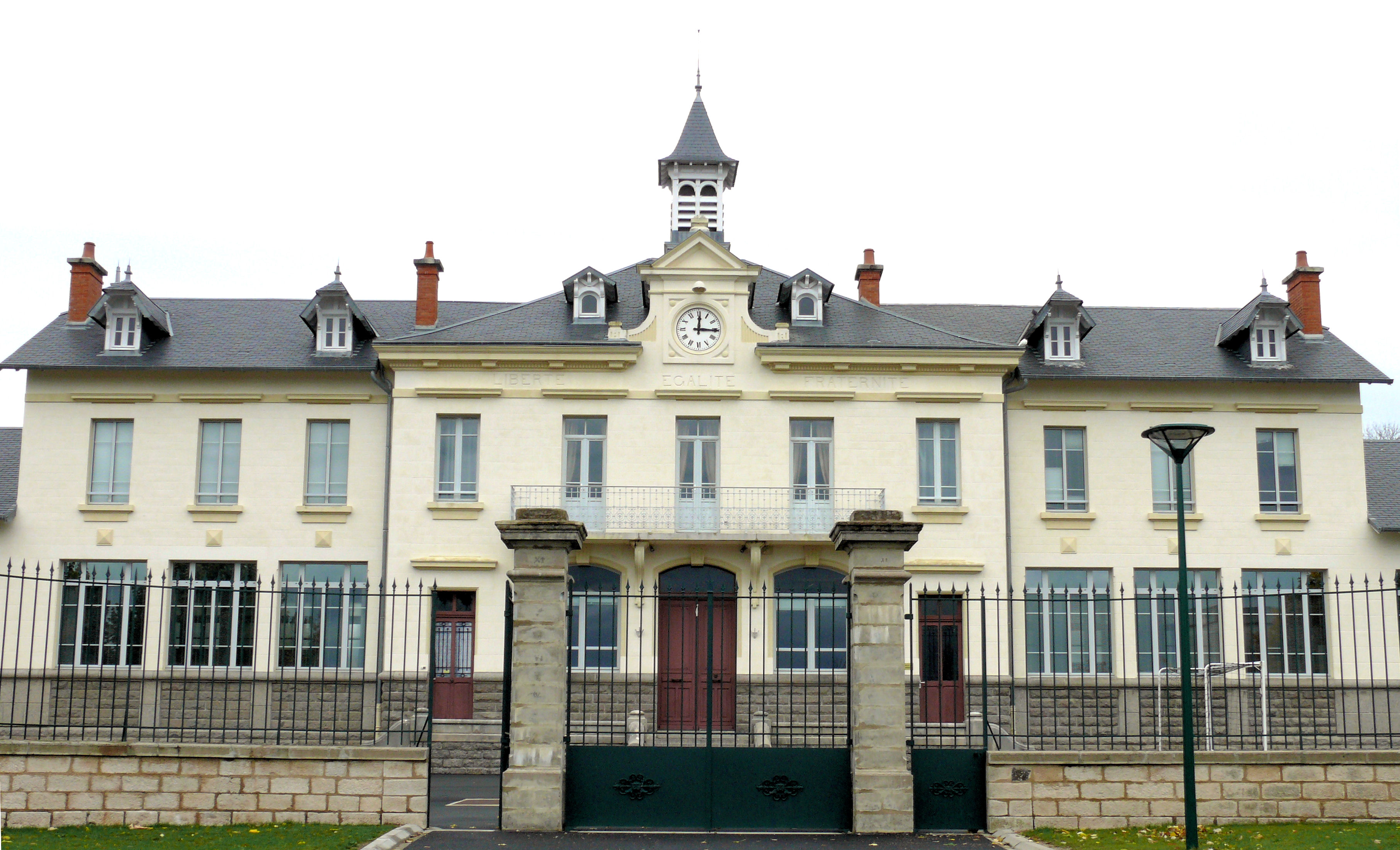
- Town hall
- Location of Tronget
- Location within France Location within Auvergne-Rhône-Alpes
- Coordinates: 46°25′24″N 3°04′08″E
- Country: France
- Region: Auvergne-Rhône-Alpes
- Department: Allier
- Arrondissement: Moulins
- Canton: Souvigny
- Intercommunality: Bocage Bourbonnais

Government
  - Mayor (2026–32): Jean-Marc Dumont
- Area^{1}: 31.06 km^{2} (11.99 sq mi)
- Elevation: 460 m (1,510 ft)
- Highest elevation: 480 m (1,570 ft)
- Lowest elevation: 369 m (1,211 ft)
- Population (2023): 925
  - Density: 29.8/km^{2} (77.1/sq mi)
- Time zone: UTC+01:00 (CET)
  - Summer (DST): UTC+02:00 (CEST)
- INSEE/Postal code: 03292 /03240
- ^{1} French Land Register data, which excludes lakes, ponds, glaciers > 1 km^{2} (0.386 sq mi or 247 acres) and river estuaries.

Tronget (French pronunciation: [tʁɔ̃ʒɛ]) is a commune in the Allier department in Auvergne-Rhône-Alpes in central France.

== Population ==
Historical population
Year	Pop.	±% p.a.
1968	1,072	—
1975	1,015	−0.78%
1982	1,001	−0.20%
1990	1,058	+0.69%
1999	928	−1.45%
2007	932	+0.05%
2012	924	−0.17%
2017	897	−0.59%
2023	925	+0.51%
Source: INSEE

== See also ==
- Communes of the Allier department
