= Meillard =

- Commune
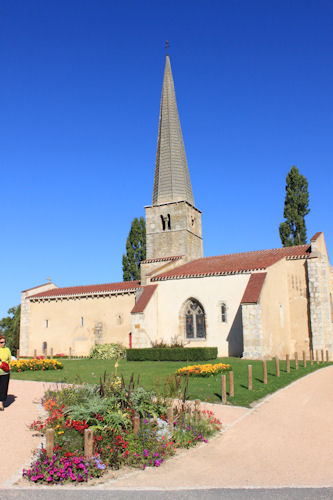
- The church in Meillard
- Location of Meillard
- Location within France Location within Auvergne-Rhône-Alpes
- Coordinates: 46°23′24″N 3°14′08″E
- Country: France
- Region: Auvergne-Rhône-Alpes
- Department: Allier
- Arrondissement: Moulins
- Canton: Souvigny
- Intercommunality: Bocage Bourbonnais

Government
  - Mayor (2026–32): Yves Simon
- Area^{1}: 25.48 km^{2} (9.84 sq mi)
- Elevation: 375 m (1,230 ft)
- Highest elevation: 391 m (1,283 ft)
- Lowest elevation: 245 m (804 ft)
- Population (2023): 303
  - Density: 11.9/km^{2} (30.8/sq mi)
- Time zone: UTC+01:00 (CET)
  - Summer (DST): UTC+02:00 (CEST)
- INSEE/Postal code: 03169 /03500
- ^{1} French Land Register data, which excludes lakes, ponds, glaciers > 1 km^{2} (0.386 sq mi or 247 acres) and river estuaries.

Meillard (French pronunciation: [mɛjaʁ]) is a commune in the Allier department in central France.

== Population ==
Historical population
Year	Pop.	±% p.a.
1968	342	—
1975	340	−0.08%
1982	300	−1.77%
1990	280	−0.86%
1999	280	+0.00%
2007	244	−1.71%
2012	299	+4.15%
2017	318	+1.24%
2023	303	−0.80%
Source: INSEE

== See also ==
- Communes of the Allier department
