= Treban =

- Commune
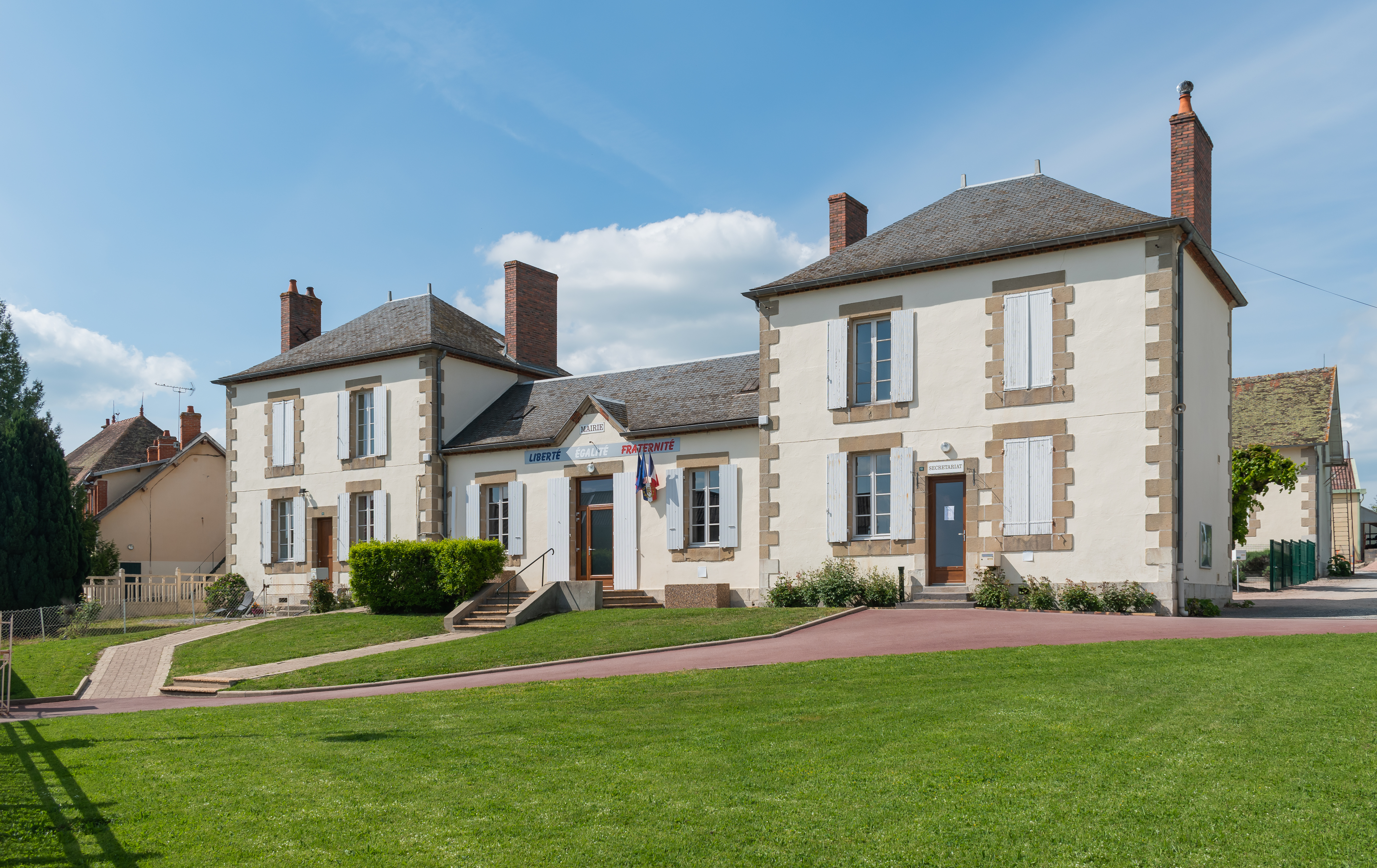
- Town hall

- Coat of arms
- Location of Treban
- Location within France Location within Auvergne-Rhône-Alpes
- Coordinates: 46°24′19″N 3°10′32″E
- Country: France
- Region: Auvergne-Rhône-Alpes
- Department: Allier
- Arrondissement: Moulins
- Canton: Souvigny
- Intercommunality: Bocage Bourbonnais

Government
  - Mayor (2026–32): Yann Jutier
- Area^{1}: 25.63 km^{2} (9.90 sq mi)
- Elevation: 304 m (997 ft)
- Highest elevation: 480 m (1,570 ft)
- Lowest elevation: 304 m (997 ft)
- Population (2023): 370
  - Density: 14/km^{2} (37/sq mi)
- Time zone: UTC+01:00 (CET)
  - Summer (DST): UTC+02:00 (CEST)
- INSEE/Postal code: 03287 /03240
- Website: treban03240allier.com (in French)
- ^{1} French Land Register data, which excludes lakes, ponds, glaciers > 1 km^{2} (0.386 sq mi or 247 acres) and river estuaries.

Treban (French pronunciation: [tʁəbɑ̃]) is a commune in the Allier department in Auvergne-Rhône-Alpes in central France.

== Population ==
Inhabitants are called Trébanais or Trébanaises in French.

Historical population
Year	Pop.	±% p.a.
1968	572	—
1975	510	−1.63%
1982	414	−2.94%
1990	386	−0.87%
1999	369	−0.50%
2007	393	+0.79%
2012	399	+0.30%
2017	387	−0.61%
2023	370	−0.75%
Source: INSEE

== See also ==
- Communes of the Allier department
