= Châtillon, Allier =

Châtillon
- Commune
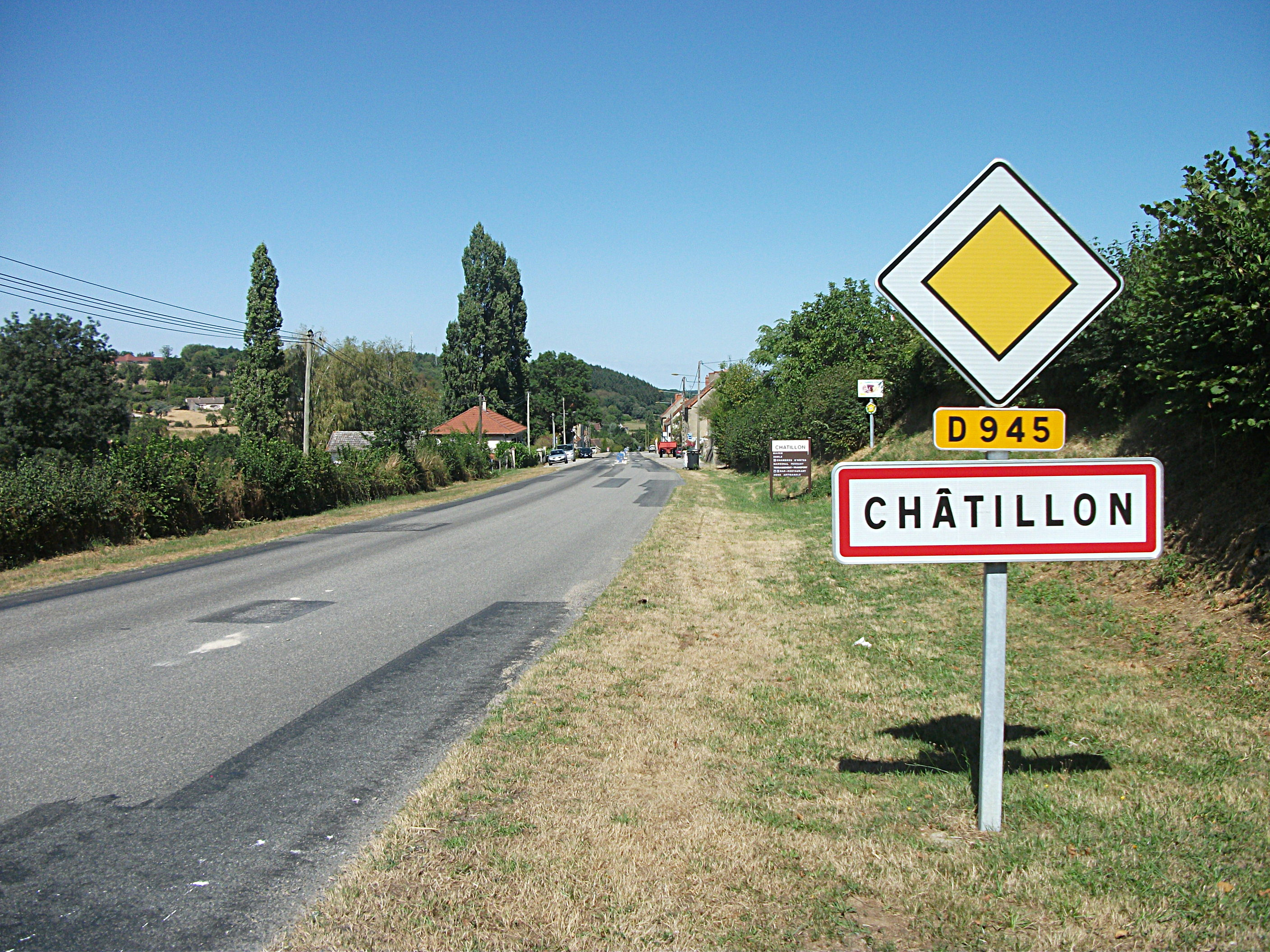
- The road D945 in Châtillon
- Location of Châtillon
- Location within France Location within Auvergne-Rhône-Alpes
- Coordinates: 46°28′27″N 3°08′01″E
- Country: France
- Region: Auvergne-Rhône-Alpes
- Department: Allier
- Arrondissement: Moulins
- Canton: Souvigny
- Intercommunality: Bocage Bourbonnais

Government
  - Mayor (2026–32): Patrick Chalmin
- Area^{1}: 12.9 km^{2} (5.0 sq mi)
- Elevation: 330 m (1,080 ft)
- Highest elevation: 456 m (1,496 ft)
- Lowest elevation: 260 m (850 ft)
- Population (2023): 317
  - Density: 24.6/km^{2} (63.6/sq mi)
- Time zone: UTC+01:00 (CET)
  - Summer (DST): UTC+02:00 (CEST)
- INSEE/Postal code: 03069 /03210
- ^{1} French Land Register data, which excludes lakes, ponds, glaciers > 1 km^{2} (0.386 sq mi or 247 acres) and river estuaries.

Châtillon (French pronunciation: [ʃatijɔ̃]) is a commune in the Allier department in central France.

== Population ==
Historical population
Year	Pop.	±% p.a.
1968	368	—
1975	374	+0.23%
1982	289	−3.62%
1990	282	−0.31%
1999	277	−0.20%
2007	313	+1.54%
2012	320	+0.44%
2017	314	−0.38%
2023	317	+0.16%
Source: INSEE

== See also ==
- Communes of the Allier department
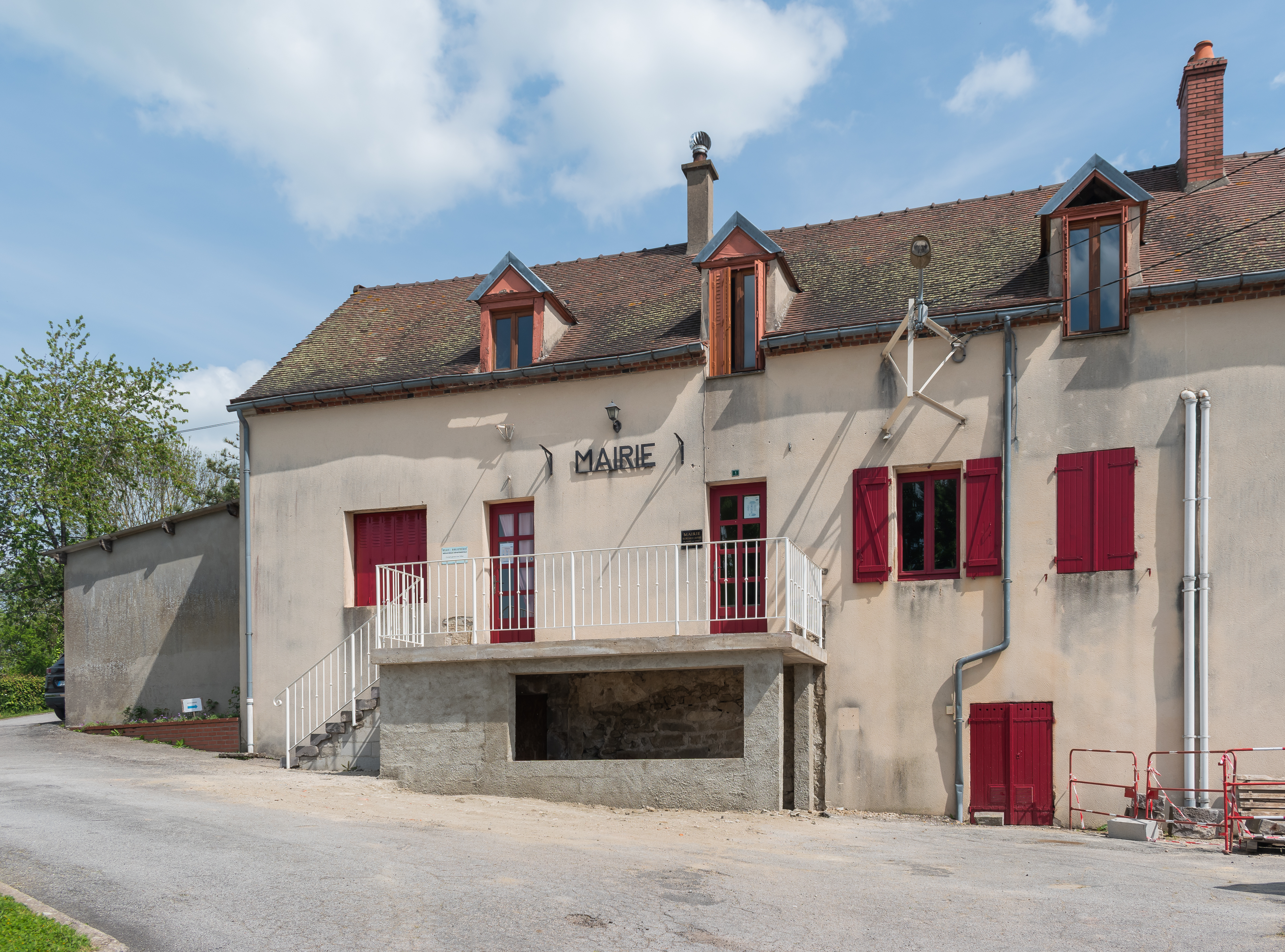
  Town hall of Châtillon, Allier, France
