= Saint-Menoux =

- Commune
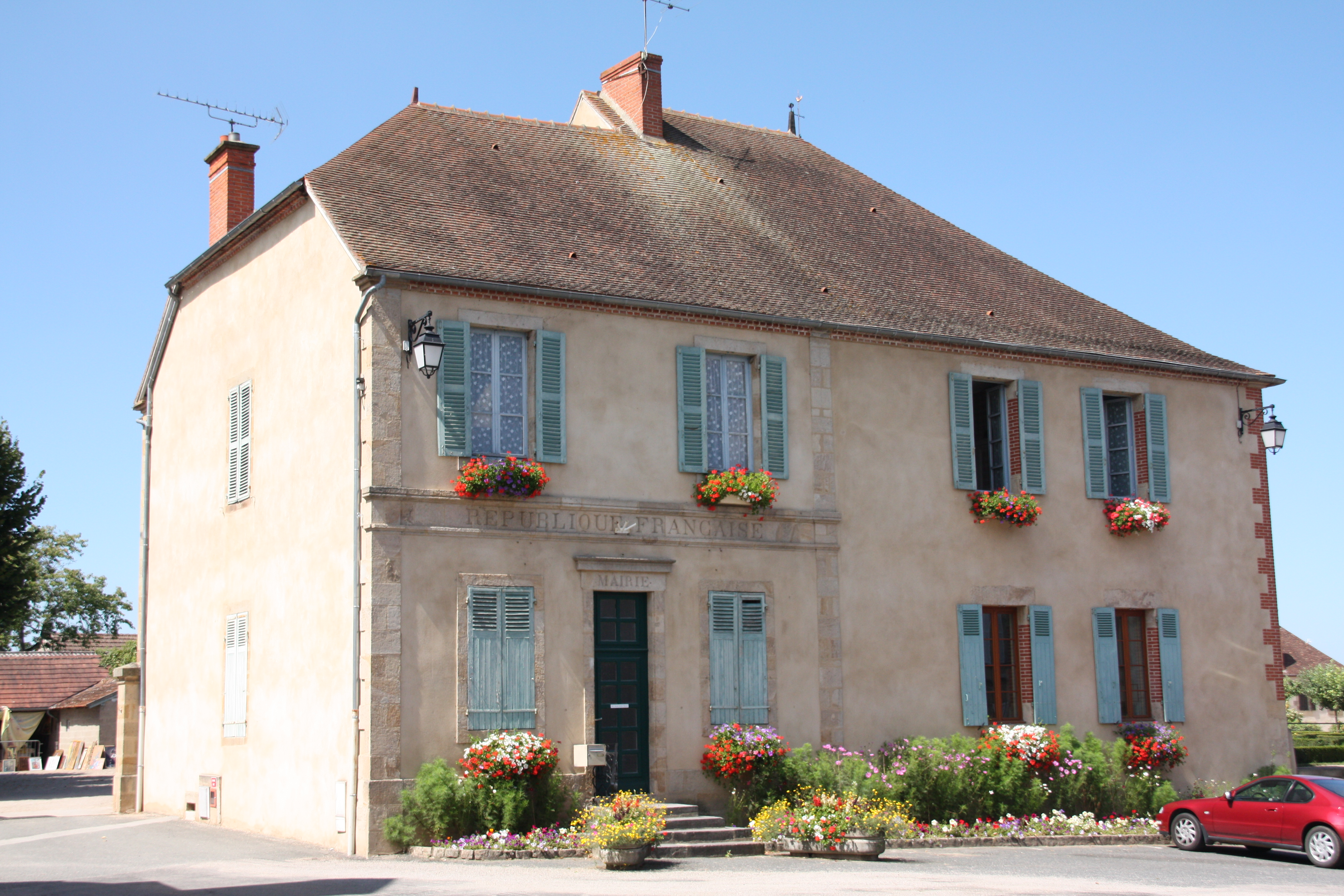
- The town hall in Saint-Menoux
- Location of Saint-Menoux
- Location within France Location within Auvergne-Rhône-Alpes
- Coordinates: 46°35′06″N 3°09′42″E
- Country: France
- Region: Auvergne-Rhône-Alpes
- Department: Allier
- Arrondissement: Moulins
- Canton: Souvigny
- Intercommunality: Bocage Bourbonnais

Government
  - Mayor (2026–32): Sylvie Edelin
- Area^{1}: 27.62 km^{2} (10.66 sq mi)
- Elevation: 249 m (817 ft)
- Highest elevation: 277 m (909 ft)
- Lowest elevation: 214 m (702 ft)
- Population (2023): 1,116
  - Density: 40.41/km^{2} (104.6/sq mi)
- Time zone: UTC+01:00 (CET)
  - Summer (DST): UTC+02:00 (CEST)
- INSEE/Postal code: 03247 /03210
- ^{1} French Land Register data, which excludes lakes, ponds, glaciers > 1 km^{2} (0.386 sq mi or 247 acres) and river estuaries.

Saint-Menoux (French pronunciation: [sɛ̃ mənu]) is a commune in the Allier department in Auvergne-Rhône-Alpes in central France.

== Population ==
Historical population
Year	Pop.	±% p.a.
1968	901	—
1975	787	−1.91%
1982	929	+2.40%
1990	986	+0.75%
1999	940	−0.53%
2007	950	+0.13%
2012	1,041	+1.85%
2017	1,045	+0.08%
2023	1,116	+1.10%
Source: INSEE

== See also ==
- Communes of the Allier department
