= Cressanges =

- Commune
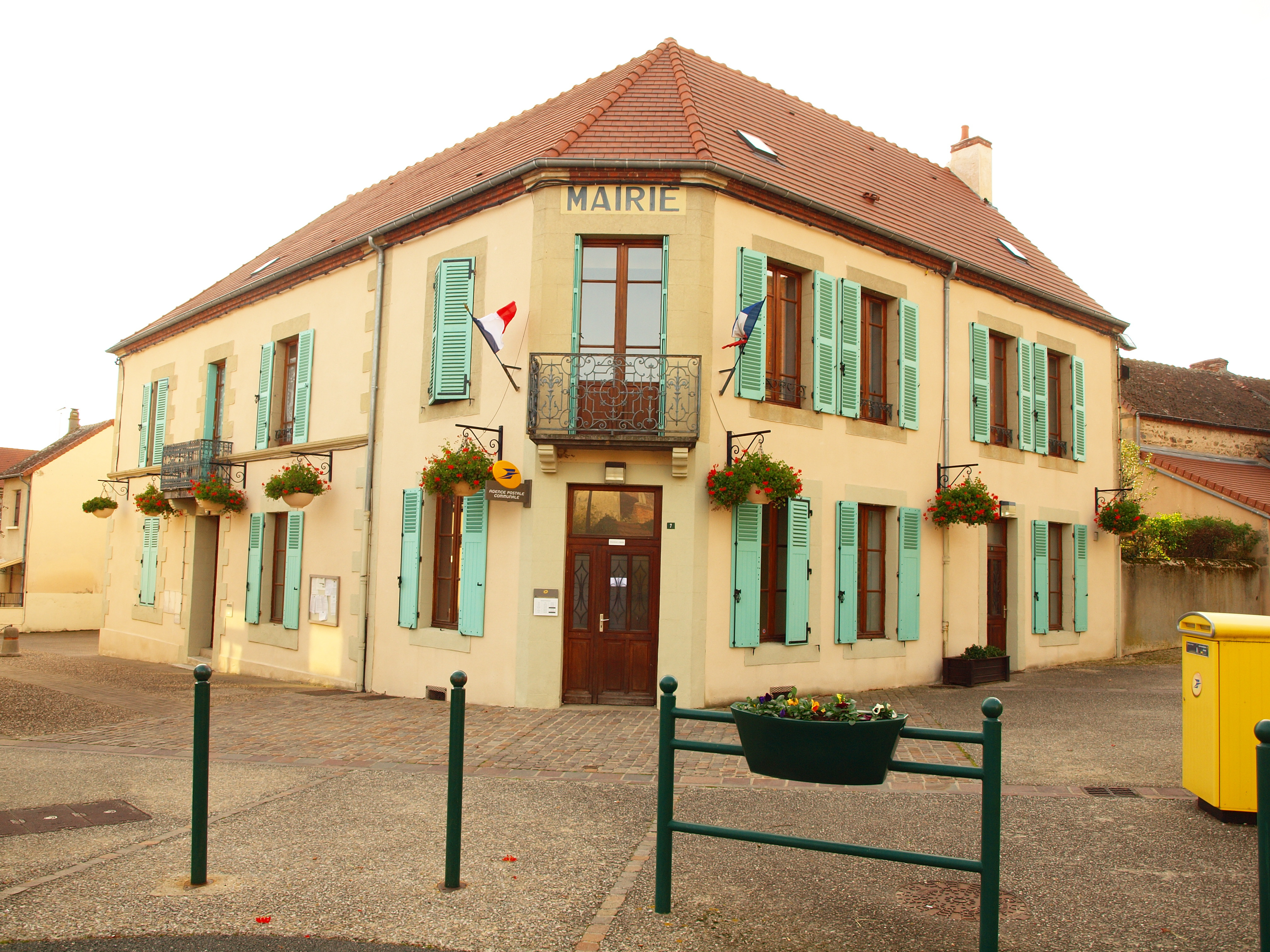
- Town hall
- Location of Cressanges
- Location within France Location within Auvergne-Rhône-Alpes
- Coordinates: 46°26′48″N 3°09′41″E
- Country: France
- Region: Auvergne-Rhône-Alpes
- Department: Allier
- Arrondissement: Moulins
- Canton: Souvigny
- Intercommunality: Bocage Bourbonnais

Government
  - Mayor (2026–32): Jean-Philippe Garnier
- Area^{1}: 41.76 km^{2} (16.12 sq mi)
- Elevation: 426 m (1,398 ft)
- Highest elevation: 475 m (1,558 ft)
- Lowest elevation: 298 m (978 ft)
- Population (2023): 644
  - Density: 15.4/km^{2} (39.9/sq mi)
- Time zone: UTC+01:00 (CET)
  - Summer (DST): UTC+02:00 (CEST)
- INSEE/Postal code: 03092 /03240
- ^{1} French Land Register data, which excludes lakes, ponds, glaciers > 1 km^{2} (0.386 sq mi or 247 acres) and river estuaries.

Cressanges (French pronunciation: [kʁesɑ̃ʒ]) is a commune in the Allier department in central France.

== Population ==
Historical population
Year	Pop.	±% p.a.
1968	884	—
1975	710	−3.08%
1982	693	−0.35%
1990	715	+0.39%
1999	670	−0.72%
2007	654	−0.30%
2012	671	+0.51%
2017	626	−1.38%
2023	644	+0.47%
Source: INSEE

== See also ==
- Communes of the Allier department
