= Gipcy =

- Commune
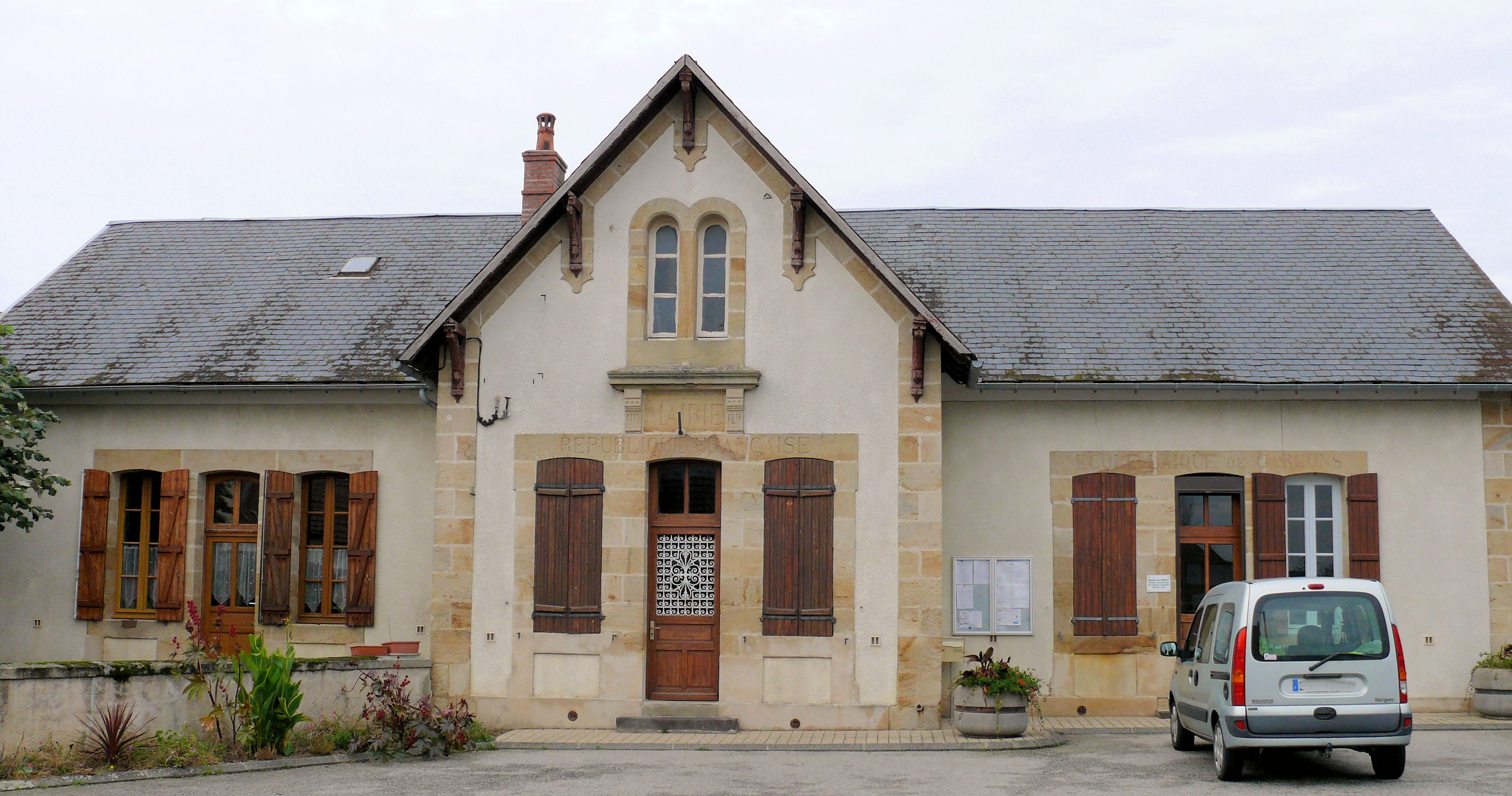
- The town hall
- Location of Gipcy
- Location within France Location within Auvergne-Rhône-Alpes
- Coordinates: 46°30′12″N 3°03′18″E
- Country: France
- Region: Auvergne-Rhône-Alpes
- Department: Allier
- Arrondissement: Moulins
- Canton: Souvigny
- Intercommunality: Bocage Bourbonnais

Government
  - Mayor (2026–32): Aude Aufauvre
- Area^{1}: 27.57 km^{2} (10.64 sq mi)
- Elevation: 385 m (1,263 ft)
- Highest elevation: 433 m (1,421 ft)
- Lowest elevation: 244 m (801 ft)
- Population (2023): 235
  - Density: 8.52/km^{2} (22.1/sq mi)
- Time zone: UTC+01:00 (CET)
  - Summer (DST): UTC+02:00 (CEST)
- INSEE/Postal code: 03122 /03210
- ^{1} French Land Register data, which excludes lakes, ponds, glaciers > 1 km^{2} (0.386 sq mi or 247 acres) and river estuaries.

Gipcy (French pronunciation: [ʒipsi]) is a commune in the Allier department in central France.

== Population ==
Historical population
Year	Pop.	±% p.a.
1968	382	—
1975	303	−3.26%
1982	292	−0.53%
1990	273	−0.84%
1999	233	−1.74%
2007	220	−0.72%
2012	229	+0.81%
2017	238	+0.77%
2023	235	−0.21%
Source: INSEE

== Administration ==
Chantal Brouttet, re-elected in March 2014 after municipal elections, was forced to resign for health reasons. She has been replaced in November 2015 by David Delegrange, who was re-elected in 2020. In October 2022 Aude Aufauvre was elected mayor.

== See also ==
- Communes of the Allier department
