= Meillers =

- Commune
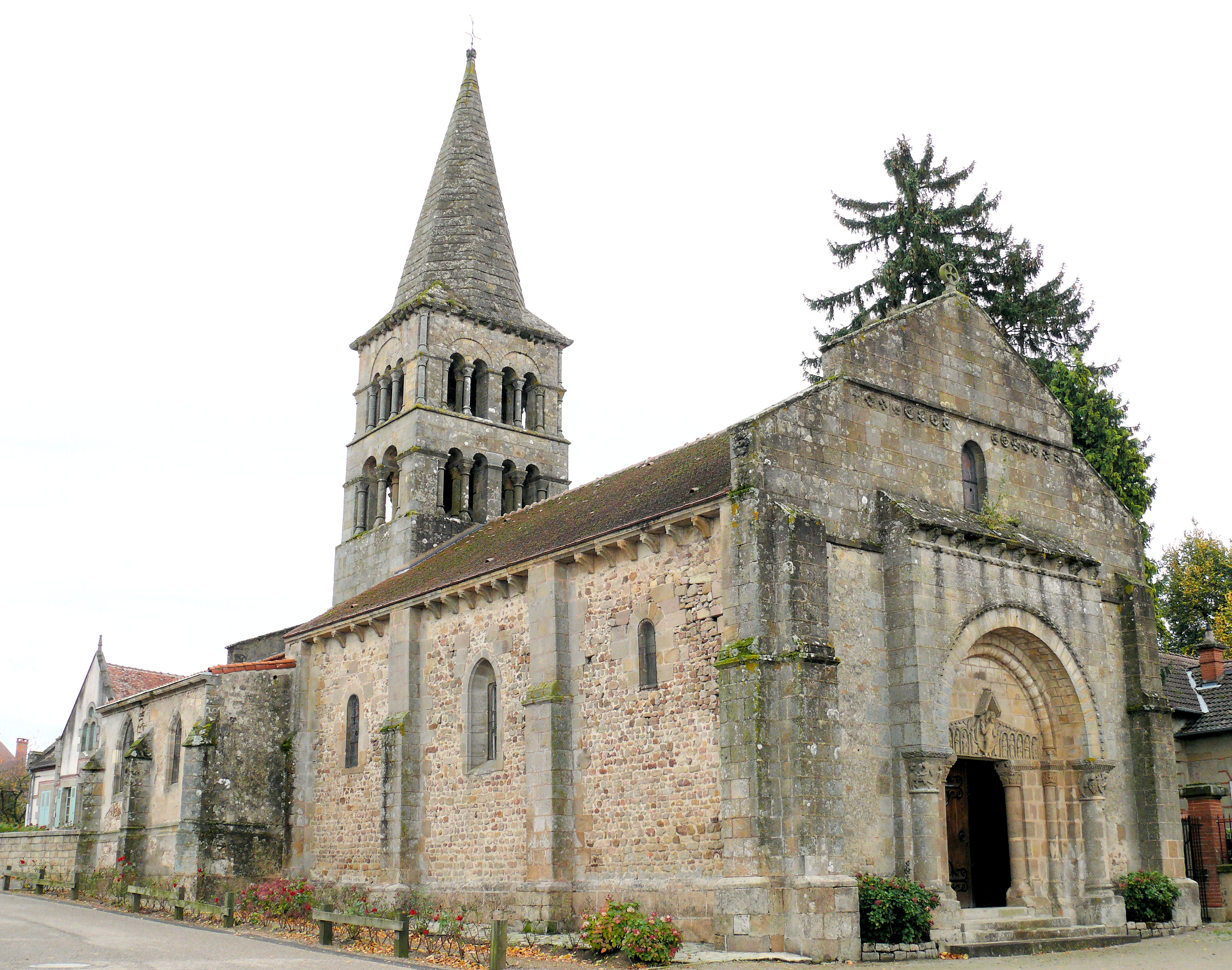
- The church in Meillers
- Location of Meillers
- Location within France Location within Auvergne-Rhône-Alpes
- Coordinates: 46°30′28″N 3°05′37″E
- Country: France
- Region: Auvergne-Rhône-Alpes
- Department: Allier
- Arrondissement: Moulins
- Canton: Souvigny
- Intercommunality: Bocage Bourbonnais

Government
  - Mayor (2026–32): Nadège Piccand
- Area^{1}: 23.48 km^{2} (9.07 sq mi)
- Elevation: 330 m (1,080 ft)
- Highest elevation: 426 m (1,398 ft)
- Lowest elevation: 240 m (790 ft)
- Population (2023): 129
  - Density: 5.49/km^{2} (14.2/sq mi)
- Time zone: UTC+01:00 (CET)
  - Summer (DST): UTC+02:00 (CEST)
- INSEE/Postal code: 03170 /03210
- ^{1} French Land Register data, which excludes lakes, ponds, glaciers > 1 km^{2} (0.386 sq mi or 247 acres) and river estuaries.

Meillers (French pronunciation: [mɛje]) is a commune in the Allier department in central France.

== Population ==
Historical population
| Year | Pop. | ±% p.a. |
|---|---|---|
| 1968 | 309 | — |
| 1975 | 240 | −3.55% |
| 1982 | 225 | −0.92% |
| 1990 | 173 | −3.23% |
| 1999 | 169 | −0.26% |
| 2007 | 159 | −0.76% |
| 2012 | 150 | −1.16% |
| 2017 | 136 | −1.94% |
| 2023 | 129 | −0.88% |
Source: INSEE

== See also ==
- Communes of the Allier department
