= Le Montet =

- Commune
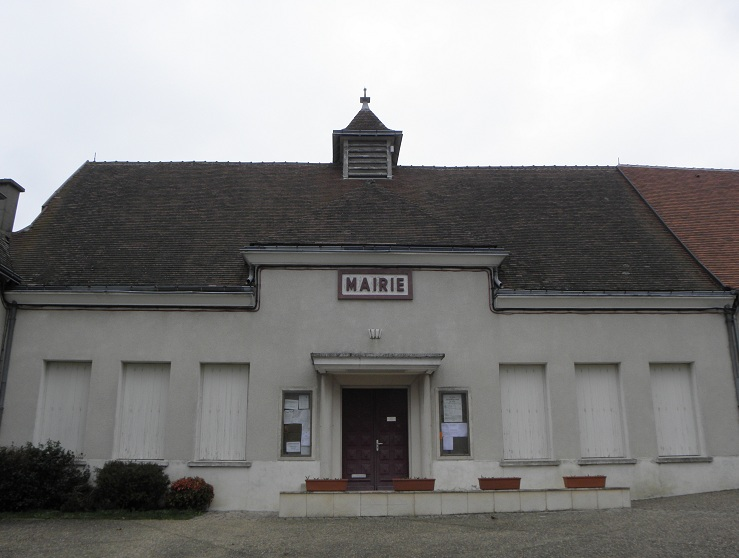
- The town hall in Le Montet

- Coat of arms
- Location of Le Montet
- Location within France Location within Auvergne-Rhône-Alpes
- Coordinates: 46°24′35″N 3°03′22″E
- Country: France
- Region: Auvergne-Rhône-Alpes
- Department: Allier
- Arrondissement: Moulins
- Canton: Souvigny
- Intercommunality: Bocage Bourbonnais

Government
  - Mayor (2026–32): Sylvain Ribier
- Area^{1}: 1.77 km^{2} (0.68 sq mi)
- Elevation: 500 m (1,600 ft)
- Highest elevation: 486 m (1,594 ft)
- Lowest elevation: 423 m (1,388 ft)
- Population (2023): 472
  - Density: 267/km^{2} (691/sq mi)
- Time zone: UTC+01:00 (CET)
  - Summer (DST): UTC+02:00 (CEST)
- INSEE/Postal code: 03183 /03240
- ^{1} French Land Register data, which excludes lakes, ponds, glaciers > 1 km^{2} (0.386 sq mi or 247 acres) and river estuaries.

Le Montet (French pronunciation: [lə mɔ̃tɛ]) is a commune in the Allier department in Auvergne-Rhône-Alpes in central France.

== Population ==
Historical population
Year	Pop.	±% p.a.
1968	583	—
1975	505	−2.03%
1982	544	+1.07%
1990	534	−0.23%
1999	502	−0.68%
2007	510	+0.20%
2012	497	−0.52%
2017	467	−1.24%
2023	472	+0.18%
Source: INSEE

== Sights ==
- Castle of Laly, which is an 18th-century building.

== See also ==
- Bourbonnais
- Communes of the Allier department
