= Bressolles, Allier =

Bressolles
- Commune
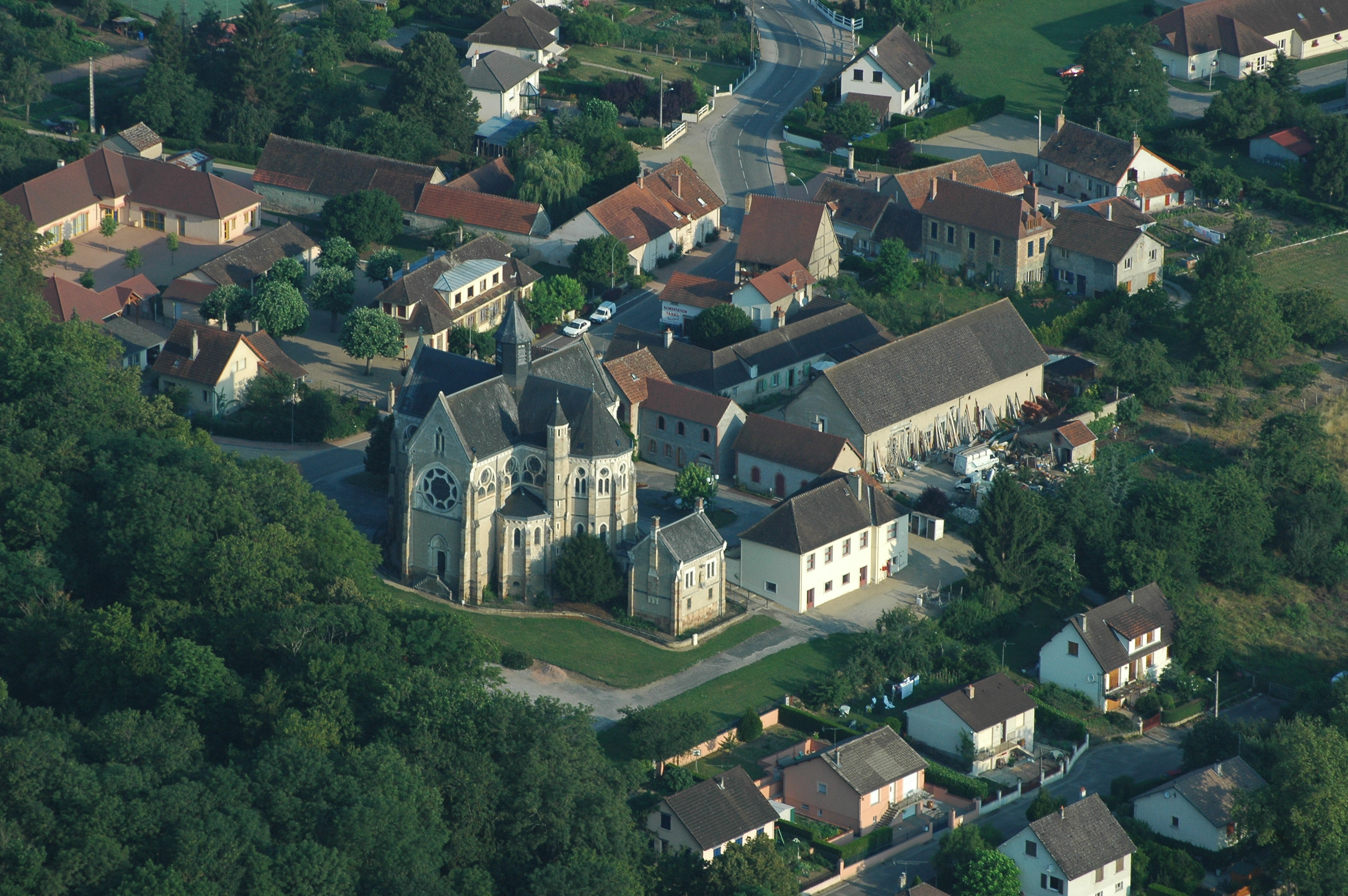
- An aerial view of Bressolles

- Coat of arms
- Location of Bressolles
- Location within France Location within Auvergne-Rhône-Alpes
- Coordinates: 46°31′53″N 3°19′02″E
- Country: France
- Region: Auvergne-Rhône-Alpes
- Department: Allier
- Arrondissement: Moulins
- Canton: Souvigny
- Intercommunality: CA Moulins Communauté

Government
  - Mayor (2026–32): Jean-Marc Etienne
- Area^{1}: 23.38 km^{2} (9.03 sq mi)
- Elevation: 225 m (738 ft)
- Highest elevation: 292 m (958 ft)
- Lowest elevation: 203 m (666 ft)
- Population (2023): 1,143
  - Density: 48.89/km^{2} (126.6/sq mi)
- Time zone: UTC+01:00 (CET)
  - Summer (DST): UTC+02:00 (CEST)
- INSEE/Postal code: 03040 /03000
- ^{1} French Land Register data, which excludes lakes, ponds, glaciers > 1 km^{2} (0.386 sq mi or 247 acres) and river estuaries.

Bressolles (French pronunciation: [bʁesɔl]) is a commune in the Allier department in central France.

== Population ==
Historical population
Year	Pop.	±% p.a.
1968	596	—
1975	783	+3.98%
1982	881	+1.70%
1990	957	+1.04%
1999	962	+0.06%
2007	1,050	+1.10%
2012	1,023	−0.52%
2017	1,113	+1.70%
2023	1,143	+0.44%
Source: INSEE

== See also ==
- Communes of the Allier department
