= Canton of Souvigny =

Coordinates: 46°32′08″N 3°11′34″E

Souvigny
- Canton
- Interactive map of Souvigny
- Country: France
- Region: Auvergne-Rhône-Alpes
- Department: Allier
- No. of communes: {{{nbcomm}}}
- Area: 679.09 km^{2} (262.20 sq mi)
- Population (2023): 14,815
  - Density: 21.816/km^{2} (56.503/sq mi)
- INSEE code: 03 16

The canton of Souvigny is a French administrative division in the French department of Allier and region Auvergne-Rhône-Alpes. At the French canton reorganisation which came into effect in March 2015, the canton was expanded from 11 to 29 communes:

1. Agonges
2. Autry-Issards
3. Besson
4. Bransat
5. Bresnay
6. Bressolles
7. Cesset
8. Châtel-de-Neuvre
9. Châtillon
10. Chemilly
11. Contigny
12. Cressanges
13. Deux-Chaises
14. Gipcy
15. Laféline
16. Marigny
17. Meillard
18. Meillers
19. Monétay-sur-Allier
20. Le Montet
21. Noyant-d'Allier
22. Rocles
23. Saint-Menoux
24. Saint-Sornin
25. Souvigny
26. Le Theil
27. Treban
28. Tronget
29. Verneuil-en-Bourbonnais
