= Jet Pocket =

French aircraft manufacturer

- Company type: Privately held company
- Industry: Aerospace
- Founded: 1989
- Founder: Phillippe Jeorgeaguet
- Defunct: 2010
- Fate: Out of business
- Headquarters: Fourilles, France
- Products: Paramotors

Jet Pocket (formally known as Air PLUM) was a French aircraft manufacturer based in Chantelle, Allier and later in Fourilles. It was founded by Phillippe Jeorgeaguet, who was world paramotor champion in 1999 and 2000. The company specialized in the design and manufacture of paramotors in the form of ready-to-fly aircraft for the US FAR 103 Ultralight Vehicles rules and the European microlight category.

The complete company name was La société Air PLUM, but its marketing positioned its Jet Pocket paramotor brand name ahead of the company name and it was most often just called Jet Pocket.

The company was founded in 1989 and seems to have gone out of business in 2010. It claimed to have been the first company to commercialize the concept of the paramotor in 1989. Reviewer Rene Coulon wrote in 2003 that "like many of their colleagues, Jet Pocket think that the quality of their products and the internet act as a substitute for a marketing plan."

Company paramotors were flown to first place in the World Paramotor Championships in 1996, 1997, 1998, 1999 and 2000, as well as winning many other championships.

Company producers included the Zenoah G-25-powered Jet Pocket Top Must, the Solo 210-powered Jet Pocket Top 210 and the Per Il Volo Top 80-powered Jet Pocket Top 80.

== Aircraft ==
Summary of aircraft built by Jet Pocket
Model name	First flight	Number built	Type
Jet Pocket Top 80			paramotor
Jet Pocket Top 210			paramotor
Jet Pocket Top Must			paramotor
