= Bayet, Allier =

Bayet
- Commune
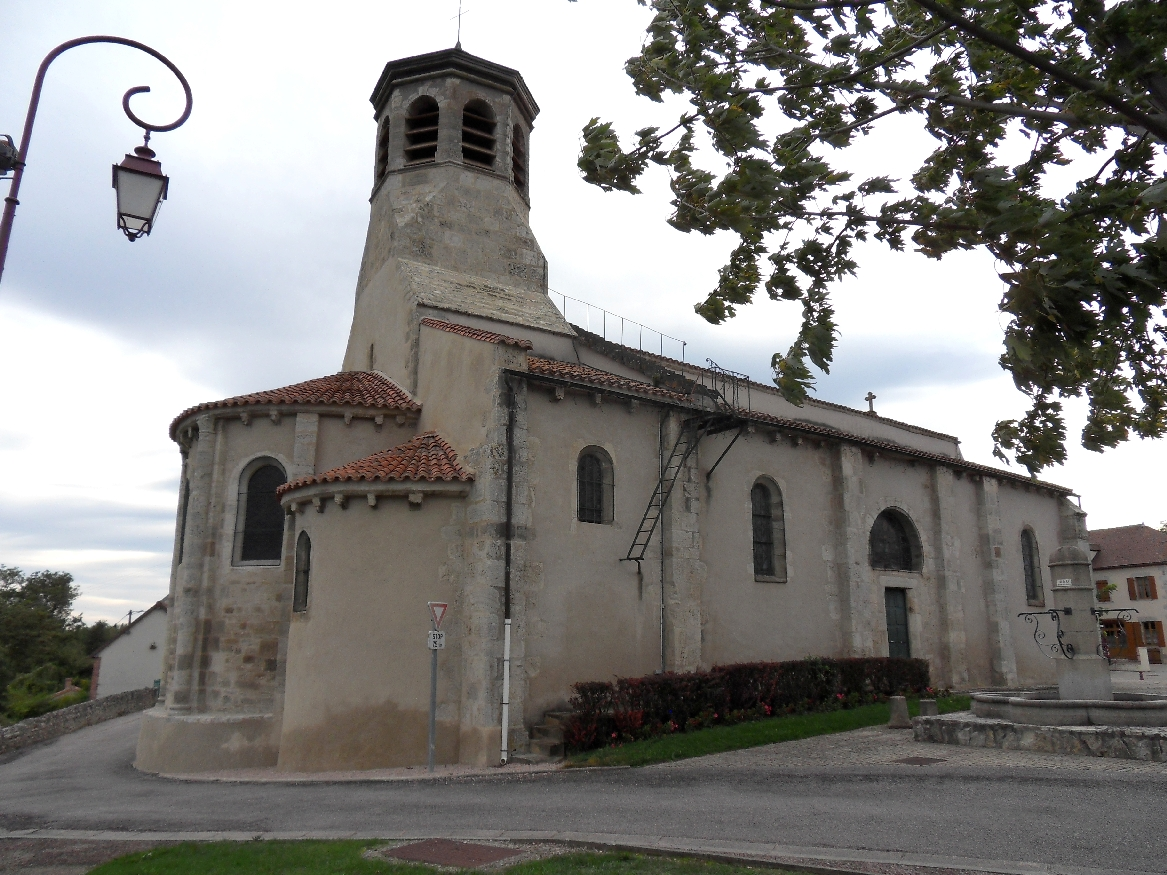
- The Church of Saint Marcel
- Location of Bayet
- Location within France Location within Auvergne-Rhône-Alpes
- Coordinates: 46°14′57″N 3°16′10″E
- Country: France
- Region: Auvergne-Rhône-Alpes
- Department: Allier
- Arrondissement: Vichy
- Canton: Saint-Pourçain-sur-Sioule
- Intercommunality: Saint-Pourçain Sioule Limagne

Government
  - Mayor (2026–32): Philippe Busseron
- Area^{1}: 22.58 km^{2} (8.72 sq mi)
- Elevation: 235 m (771 ft)
- Highest elevation: 290 m (950 ft)
- Lowest elevation: 237 m (778 ft)
- Population (2023): 672
  - Density: 29.8/km^{2} (77.1/sq mi)
- Time zone: UTC+01:00 (CET)
  - Summer (DST): UTC+02:00 (CEST)
- INSEE/Postal code: 03018 /03500
- ^{1} French Land Register data, which excludes lakes, ponds, glaciers > 1 km^{2} (0.386 sq mi or 247 acres) and river estuaries.

Bayet (French pronunciation: [bajɛ]; Occitan: Baiet) is a commune in the Allier department in the Auvergne-Rhône-Alpes region of central France.

The inhabitants of the commune are known as Bayétois or Bayétoises.

== Geography ==
Bayet is located some 36 km (22 mi) south of Moulins and 18 km (11 mi) north-west of Vichy. Access to the commune is by the D2009 (former N9) road from Saint-Pourçain-sur-Sioule in the north which passes through the commune east of the village and continues south to Le Mayet-d'École. The D6 branches off the D2009 in the commune and goes south-east to Saint-Didier-la-Forêt. Access to the village is by the D406 which branches off the D2009 in the commune and goes south-west to the village changing to the D519. The D183 goes south from the village to Barberier. The D219 comes from Chareil-Cintrat in the west and passes through the village before continuing east to join the D6. The D35 from Étroussat in the south-west to Saint-Pourcain-sur-Sioule passes through the west of the commune. Apart from the village there are the hamlets of Nerignet, Le Marais, Les Echaloux, La Rue du Jo, Le Plaix, Le Chambon, and Les Bouillots. The commune is almost entirely farmland.

The railway line from La Ferté-Hauterive to Gannat once passed through the commune. It was the last line to have been commissioned by the Chemins de fer de Paris à Lyon et à la Méditerranée in 1932. It was closed to passenger traffic in 1938. The section between the stations of Saint-Pourçain-sur-Sioule and Bayet was closed to freight traffic in 1960 and decommissioned in 1969 followed by a path being created in 1974.

Bayet once had a station on this line. The passenger station was built "midway between the ends of the line, [...] comprising [...] a siding of 700 m length".

The Sioule river flows through the commune from south to north and continues north to join the Allier north-east of Contigny. The Bouble river flows from the west and through the western part of the commune as it flows north-east to join the Sioule on the commune border.

== Toponymy ==
Bayet appears as Bayet on the 1750 Cassini Map and the same on the 1790 version.

== History ==
The former commune of Martilly was merged with Bayet in 1807.

== Administration ==
List of Successive Mayors

From	To	Name
2001	2020	Bernard Daniel
2020	Current	Philippe Busseron

== Demography ==
Historical population

Year	Pop.	±% p.a.
1793	535	—
1800	584	+1.26%
1806	563	−0.61%
1821	1,002	+3.92%
1831	1,069	+0.65%
1836	1,108	+0.72%
1841	1,079	−0.53%
1846	1,080	+0.02%
1851	1,088	+0.15%
1856	1,132	+0.80%
1861	1,140	+0.14%
1866	1,115	−0.44%
1872	1,134	+0.28%
1876	1,104	−0.67%
1881	1,154	+0.89%
1886	1,066	−1.57%
1891	1,013	−1.01%
1896	956	−1.15%
1901	939	−0.36%

Year	Pop.	±% p.a.
1906	965	+0.55%
1911	1,002	+0.76%
1921	847	−1.67%
1926	809	−0.91%
1931	763	−1.16%
1936	738	−0.66%
1946	716	−0.30%
1954	729	+0.23%
1962	664	−1.16%
1968	607	−1.48%
1975	593	−0.33%
1982	528	−1.64%
1990	556	+0.65%
1999	606	+0.96%
2007	668	+1.23%
2012	684	+0.47%
2017	698	+0.41%
2023	672	−0.63%

Source: EHESS and INSEE

=== Education ===
The commune has a primary school which is part of the Académie de Clermont-Ferrand.

== Economy ==
=== Population and income tax ===
In 2011, the median household income tax amounted to €26,288, placing Bayet at the 22,612nd ranking of communes with more than 49 households in metropolitan France.

Local taxes applicable in Bayet are: housing tax 8.18%; property tax on built-up properties 8.44%, and Undeveloped properties 33.84%. These rates are unchanged compared in 2014 and in 2013 these figures were lower than the average of the stratum corresponding to communes from 500 to 2000 inhabitants. The community of communes to which Bayet belongs is not eligible for the property tax on buildings however the residential tax rate (10.89%) and the developed property (additional charge: 37.57%) exceed those of the commune.

=== Employment ===
In 2012 the population aged 15–64 years was 430 people among which 77% were employable, 66.1% in employment and 10.8% were unemployed. (Note: EMP T1 – Population from 15 to 64 years by type of activity.)

There were 446 jobs in the employment area. The number of active employed residing in the area being 287, the job concentration indicator is 155.5% which means that the commune offers more than one job per employable person. (Note: EMP T5 – Employment and Activity (in French))

=== Businesses ===
On 1 January 2013 Bayet had 31 businesses: 10 in industry, 5 in construction, and 16 in trade, transport and other services. There were no businesses in the administrative sector. (Note: DEN T3 – Number of enterprises by sector of activity at 1 January 2013 (in French))

=== Industry ===
The commune has a Combined cycle gas electricity generator, the 3CB (for Central Combined Cycle Bayet), owned by the Swiss energy company Alpiq. It entered service in 2011 with a capacity of 408 megawatts. It produces annually an average of about 1.6 billion kWh, which is equivalent to the consumption of 400,000 homes. 3CB cost 300 million euros. The installation in Bayet was due to the presence of a major high-voltage RTE substation and a GRTgas pipeline.

The Lucane energy plant, established since 1 April 1982, can "enhance the autonomy of municipal waste for 96000 Bourbonnais". This unit is on track to pass ISO 50001 certification.

=== Tourism ===
On 1 January 2015 the commune had no hotels, (Note: TOU T1 – Number and capacity of hotels on 1 January 2015 (in French)) nor campsites, (Note: TOU T2 – Number and capacity of camp sites on 1 January 2015 (in French)) or any other collective accommodation. (Note: TOU T3 – Number of other collective accommodations on 1 January 2015 (in French))

== Culture and heritage ==
=== Religious heritage ===
- The Church of Saint Marcel (12th century) is registered as an historical monument.

== See also ==
- Communes of the Allier department
