= Bayet =

Bayet may refer to:

== People ==
- Albert Bayet (born 1880), French sociologist
- Charles Bayet (1849–1918), French historian
- Hugues Bayet, Belgian politician
- Jean Bayet (1892–1969), French Latinist
- Jean-Baptiste Annibal Aubert du Bayet (1759–1797), French general and politician
- Lucy Bayet, Australian fashion model

== Places ==
- Bayet, Allier, Auvergne-Rhône-Alpes, France
- Bayet Peak, Antarctica
