= Château Rocher =

French castle

Coordinates: 46°5′21″N 2°55′41″E

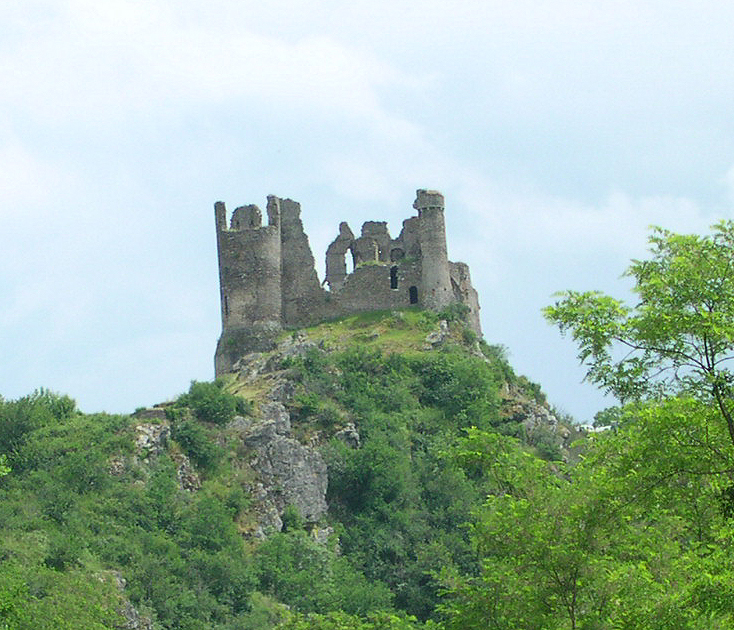
Château-Rocher from the Sioule valley

The Château Rocher (or Château fort de Blot-le-Rocher) is a French castle overlooking the Sioule river valley. It is located in the commune of Saint-Rémy-de-Blot in the Puy-de-Dôme département of the Auvergne-Rhône-Alpes région.

The "romantic ruins of Château Rocher", standing on a cliff above the river, are the remains of a 13th-century construction, with evidence of earlier (11th century) building. The castle was built by the Lords of Bourbon. A masonry bridge crossing the moat leads to the entry door, now ruined, and the outer wall. A second wall existed in front of the two eastern towers. Three principal towers flanked the east and north fronts.

Privately owned, Château Rocher has been listed since 1913 as a monument historique by the French Ministry of Culture.

== Gallery ==
| Click on images to enlarge |

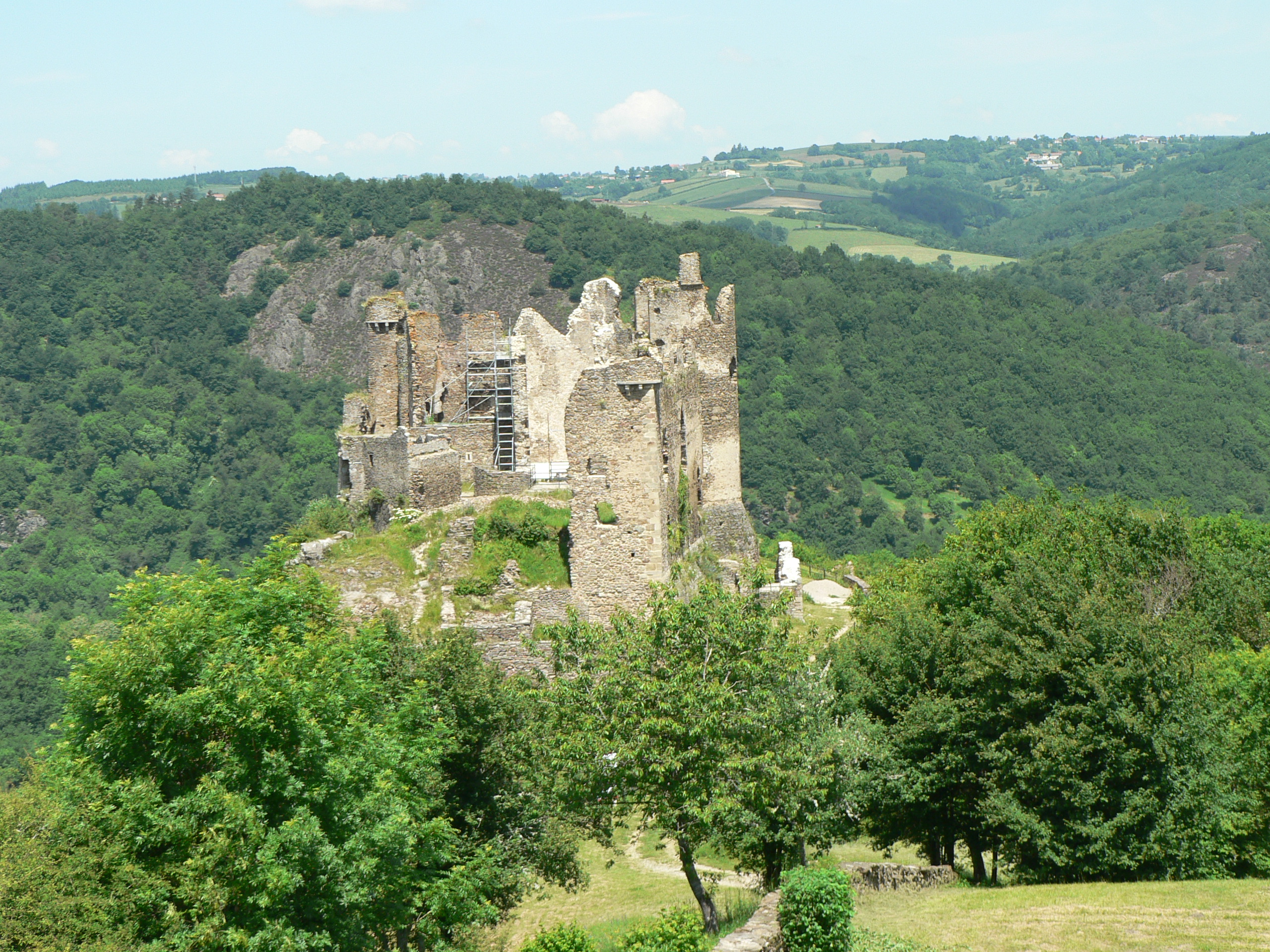

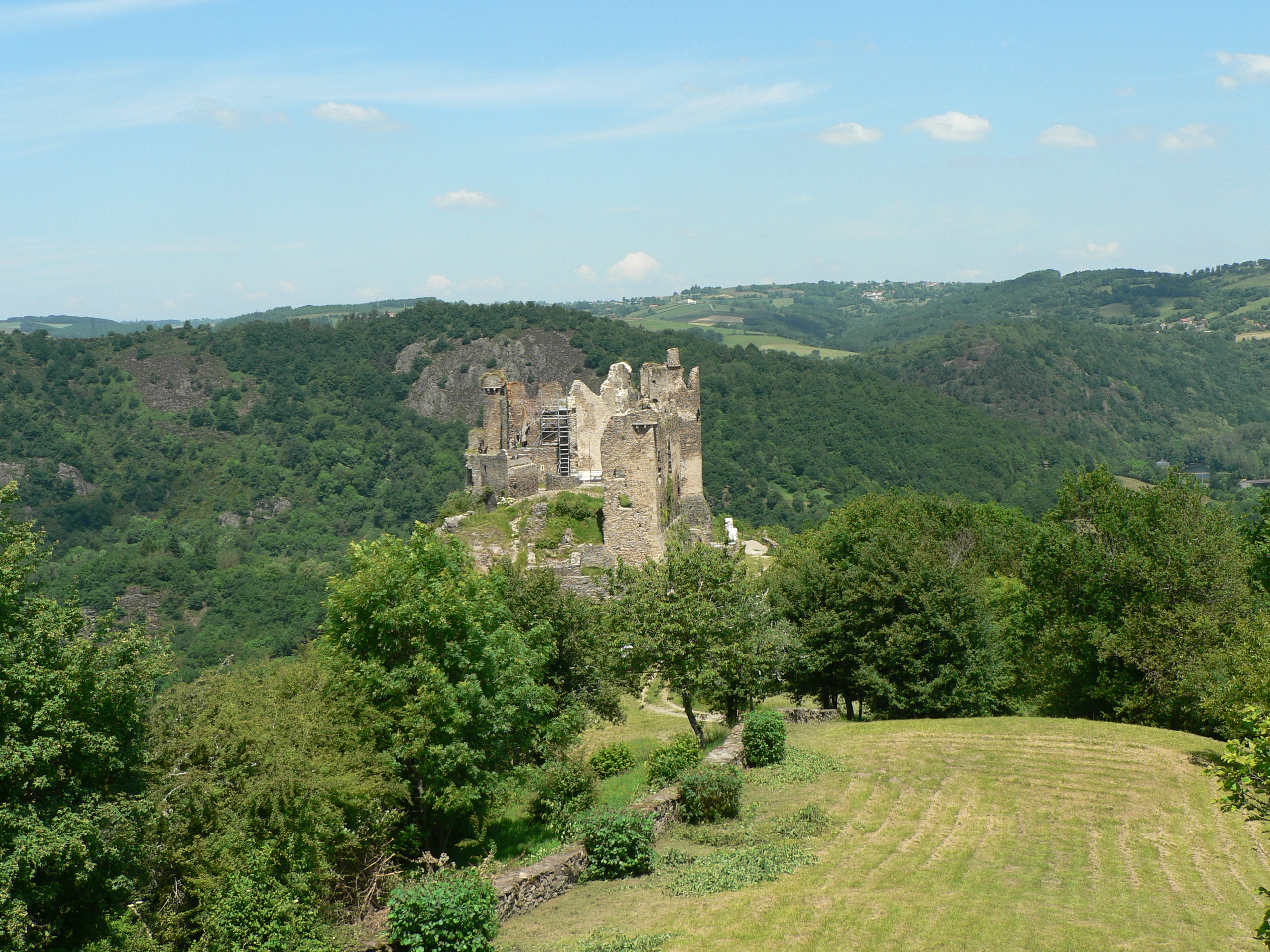

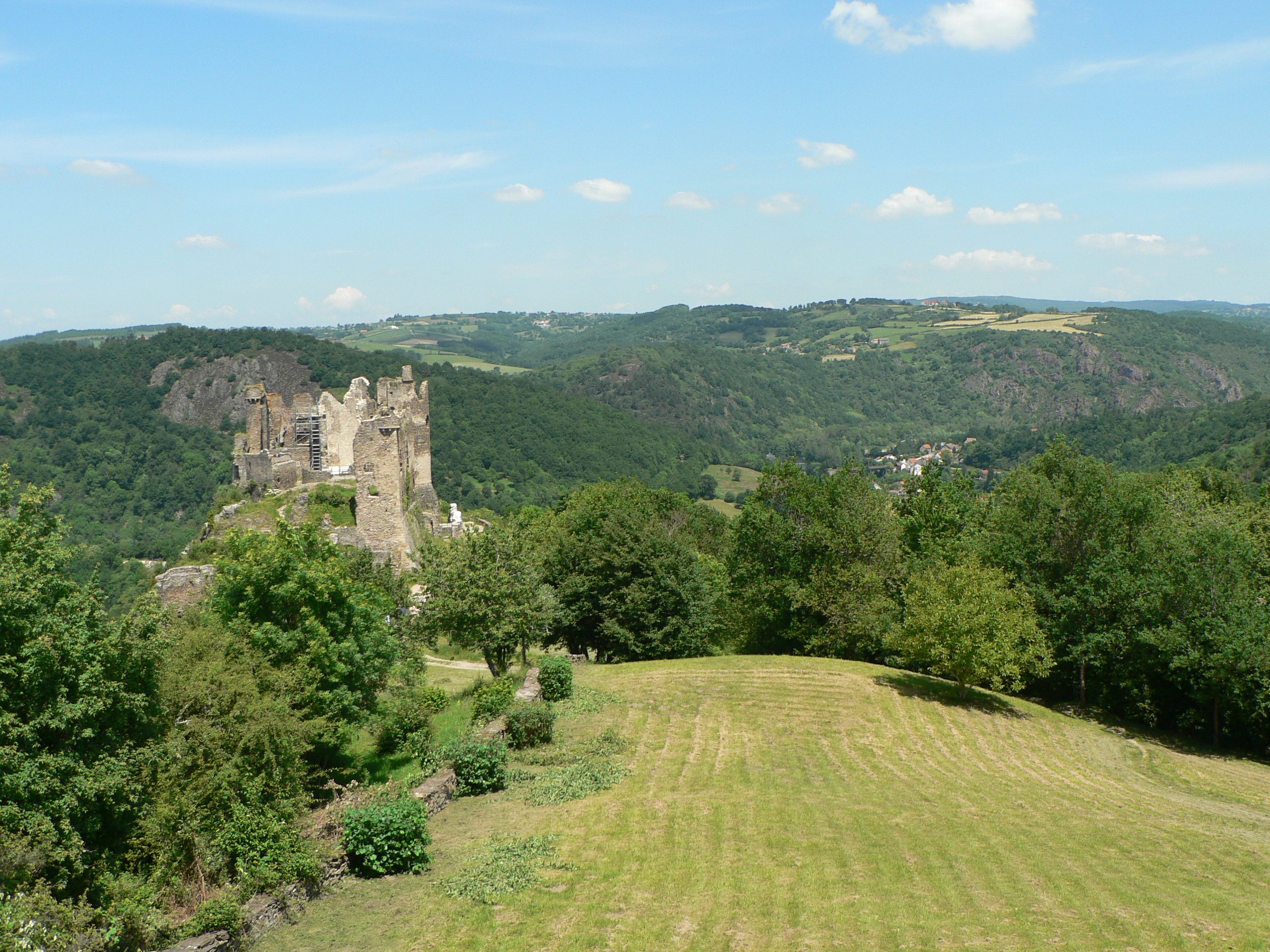

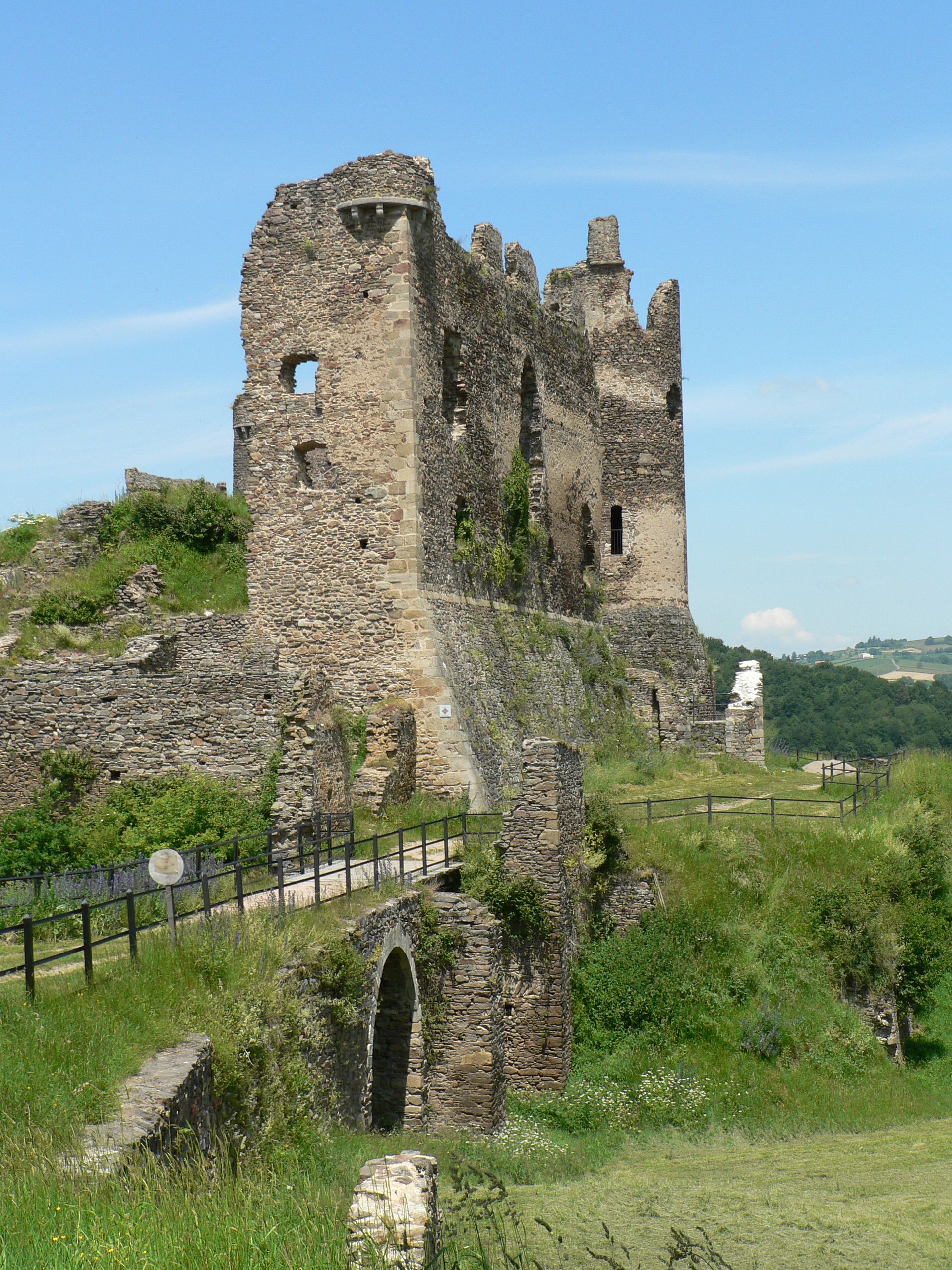

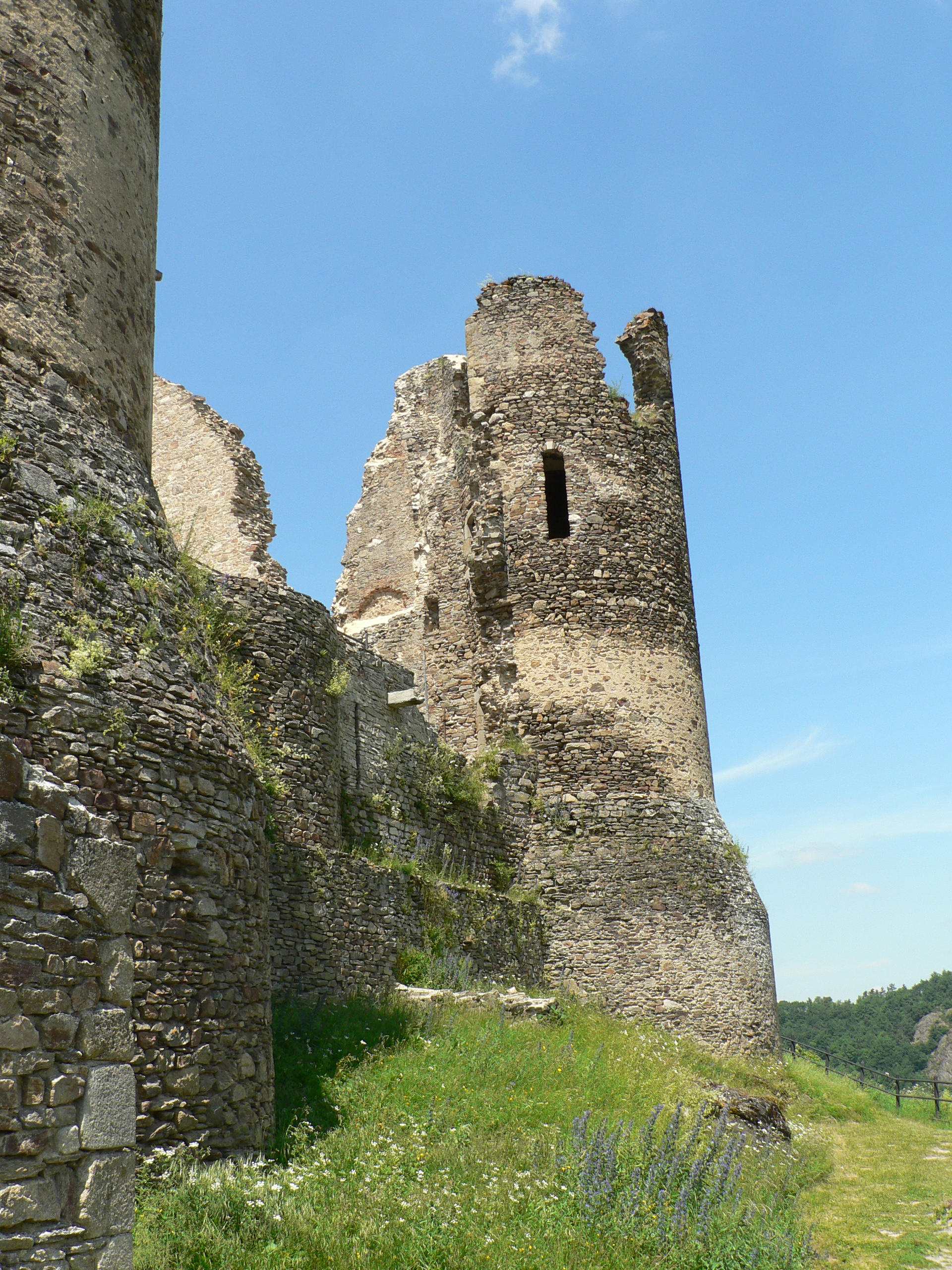

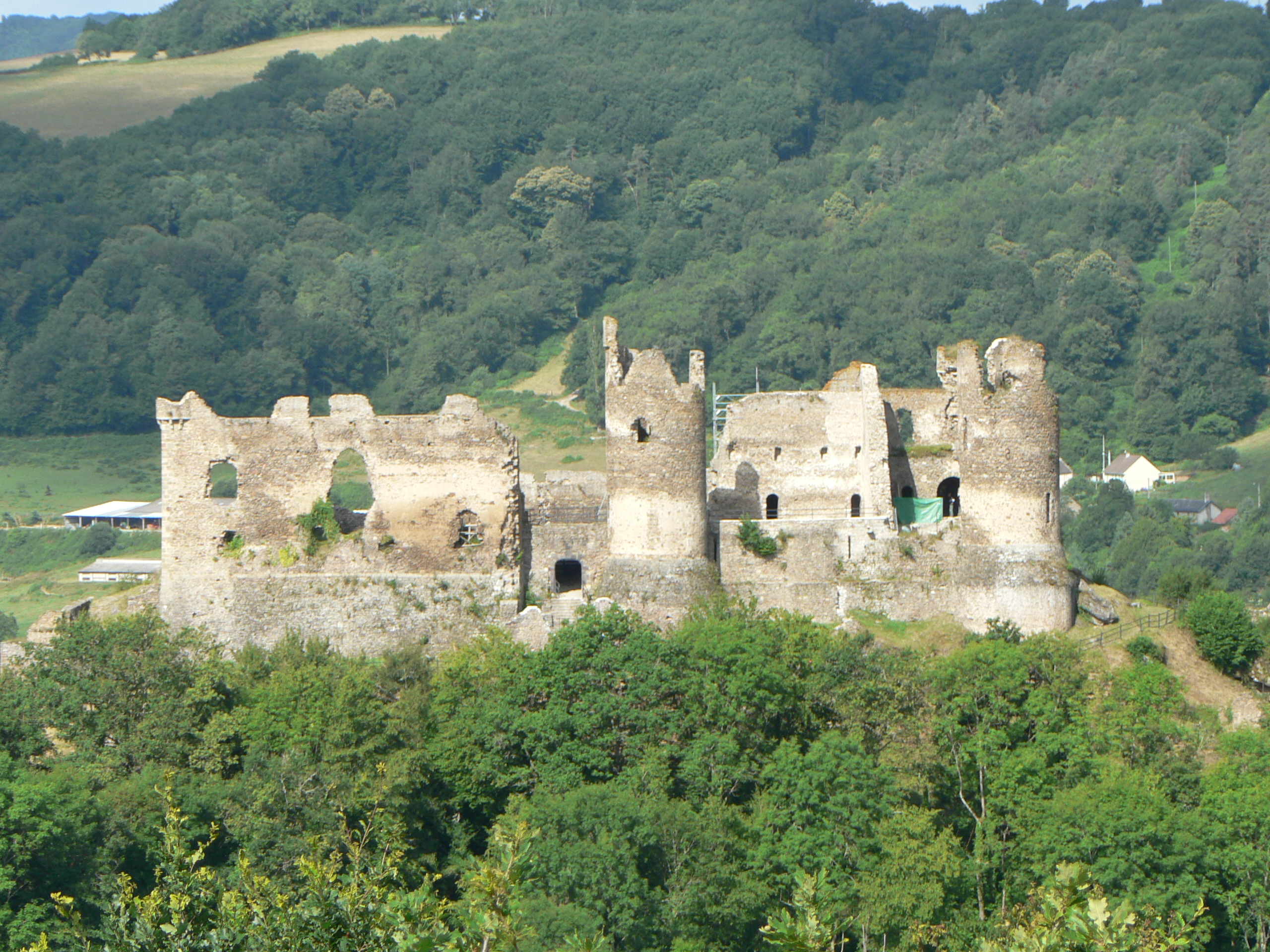

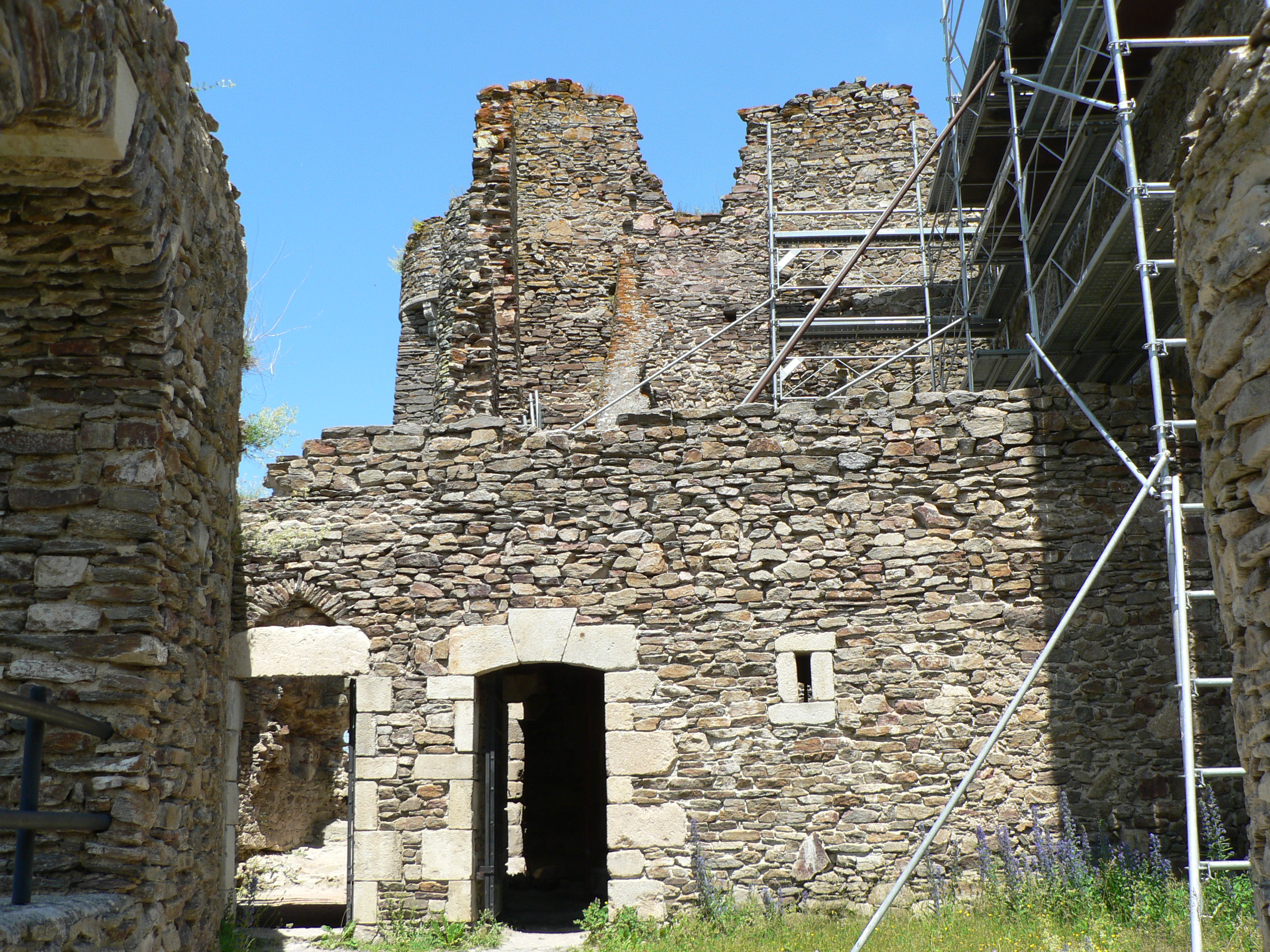

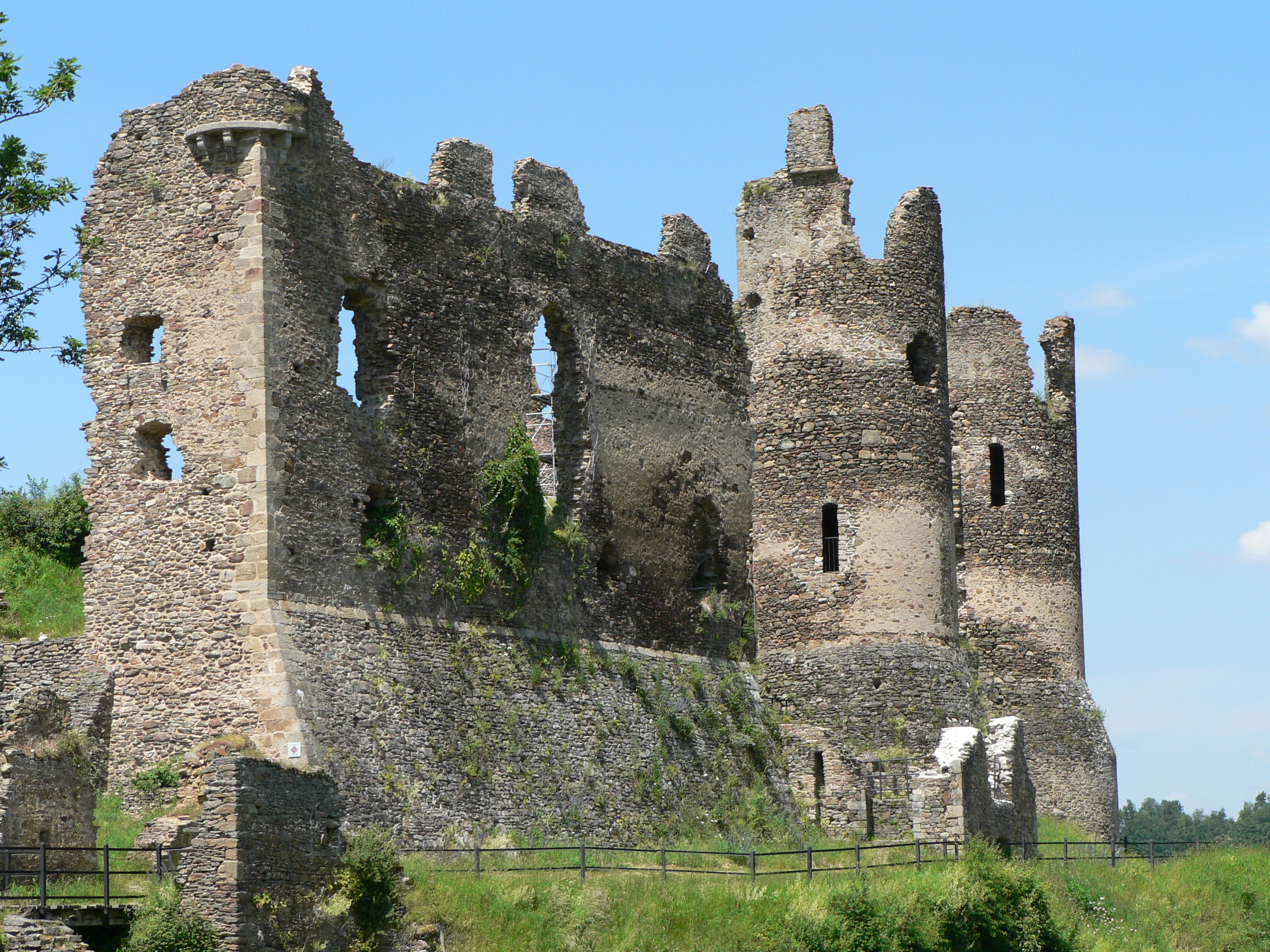

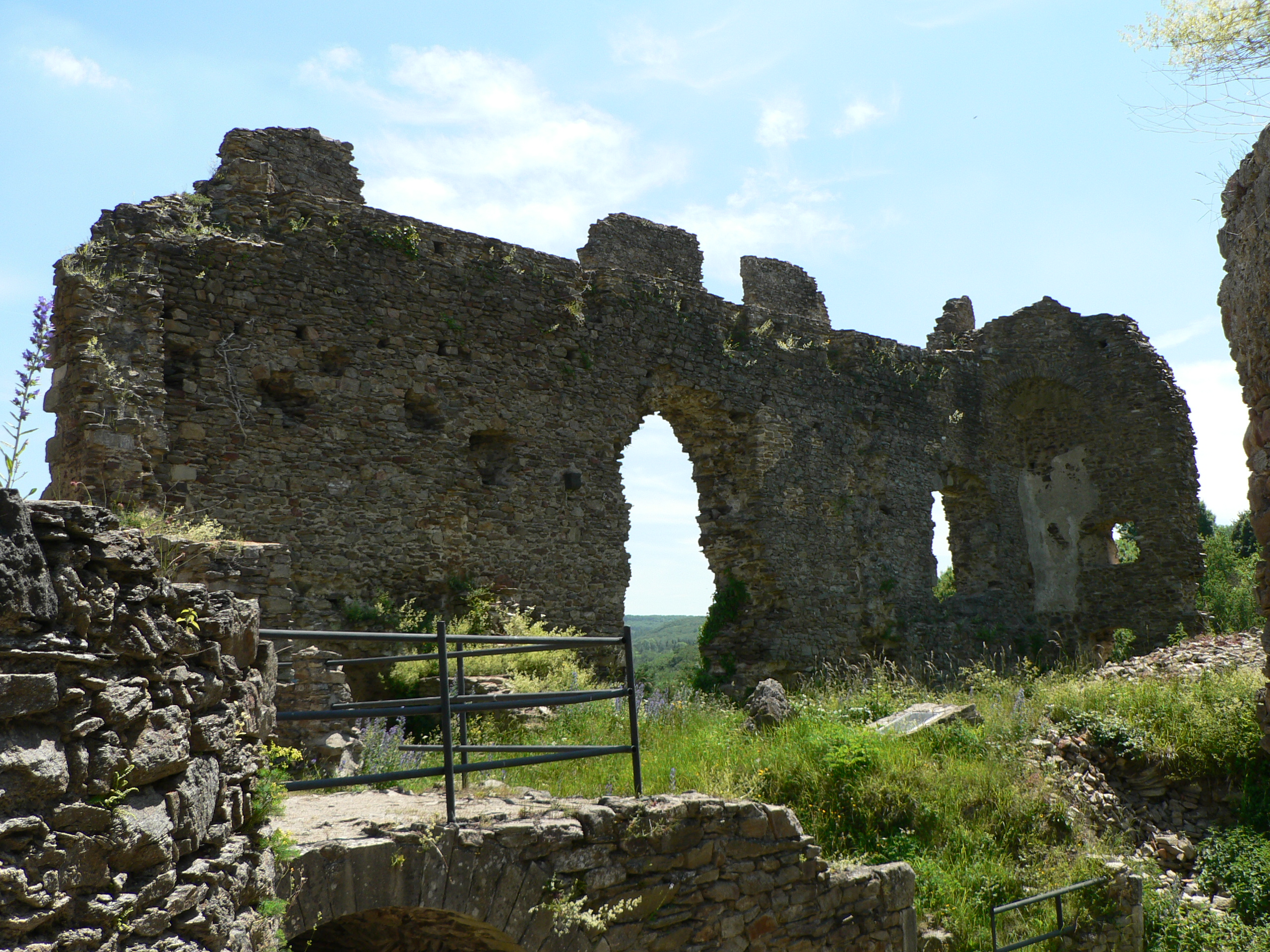

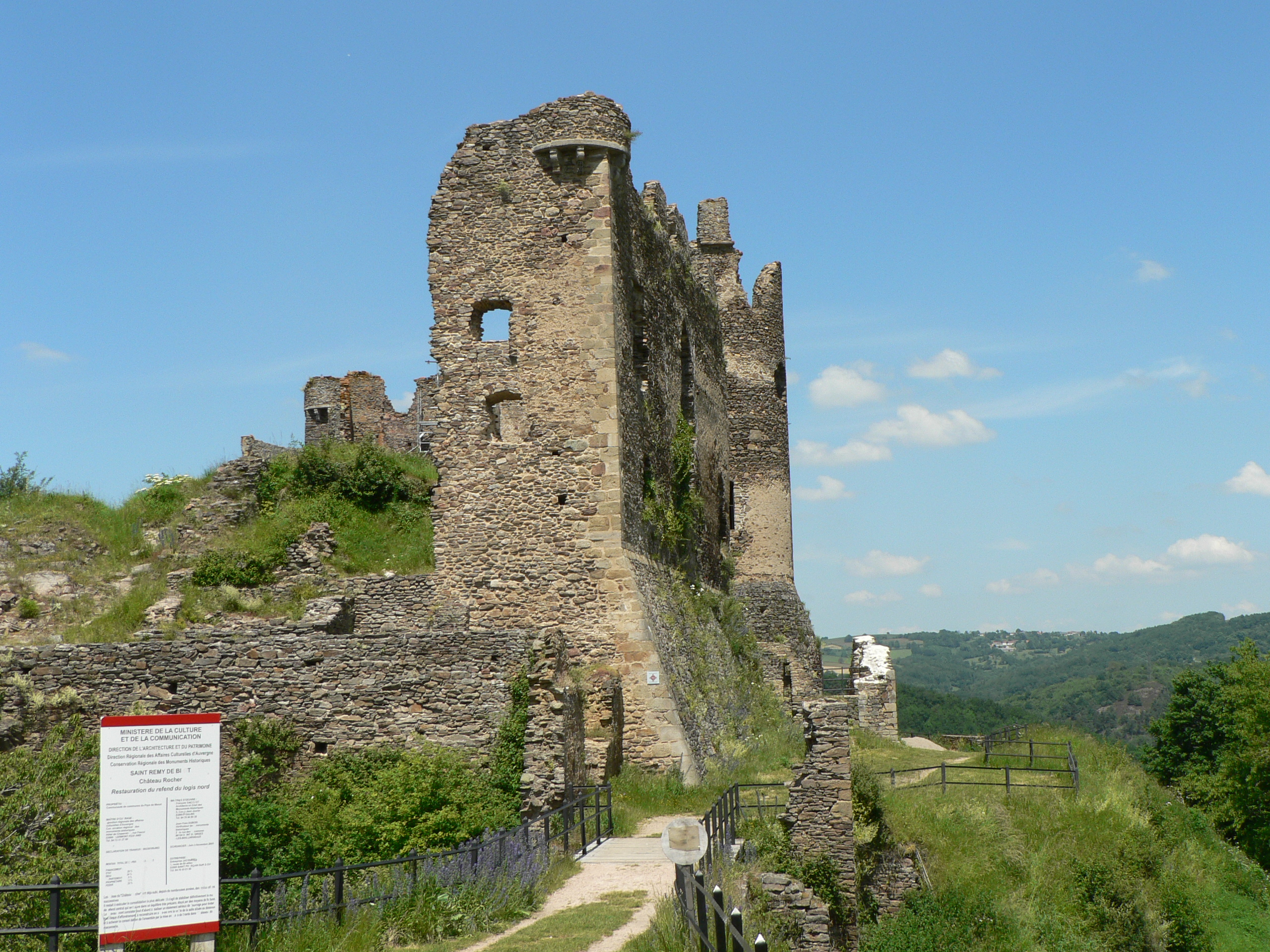

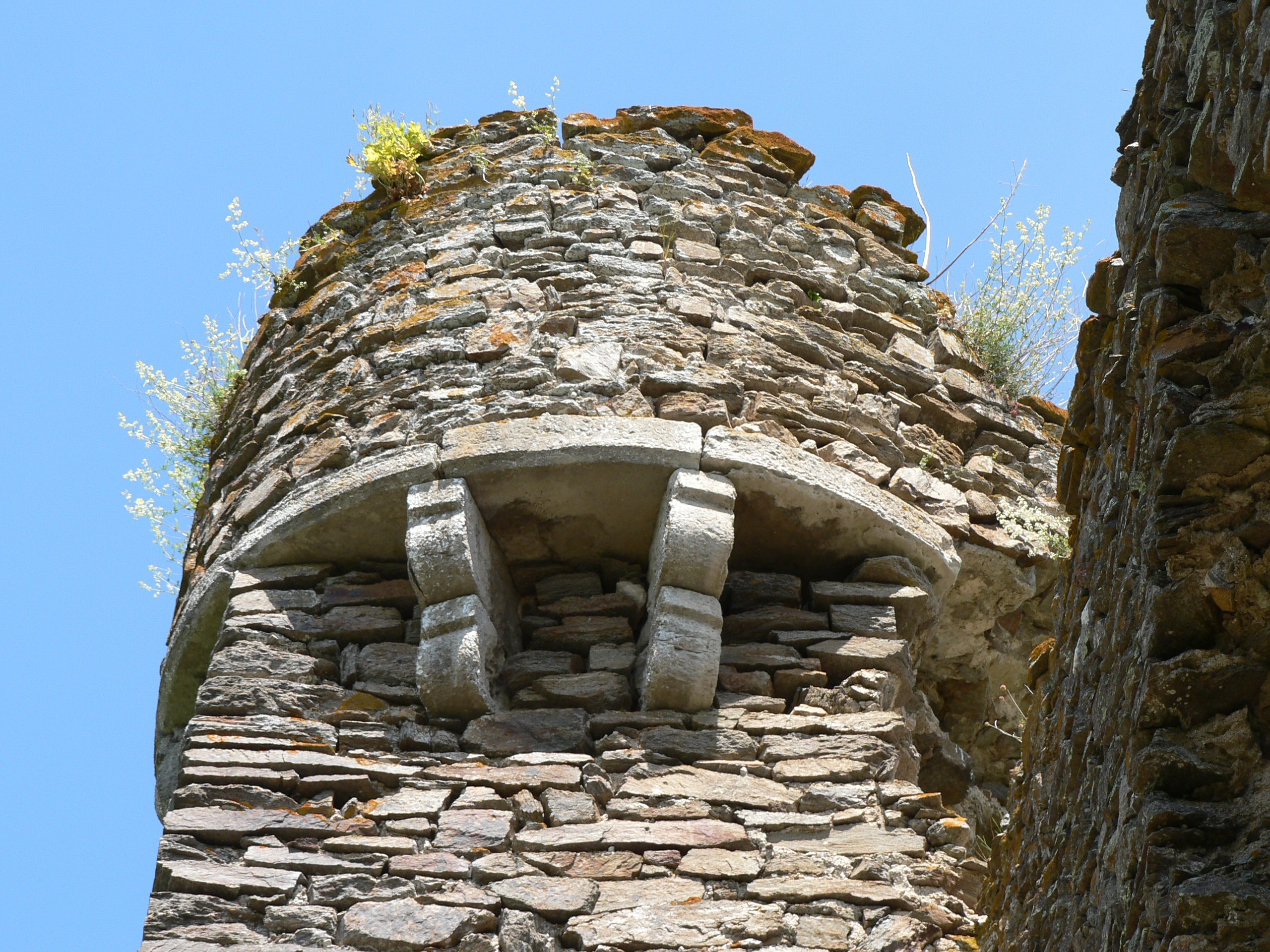

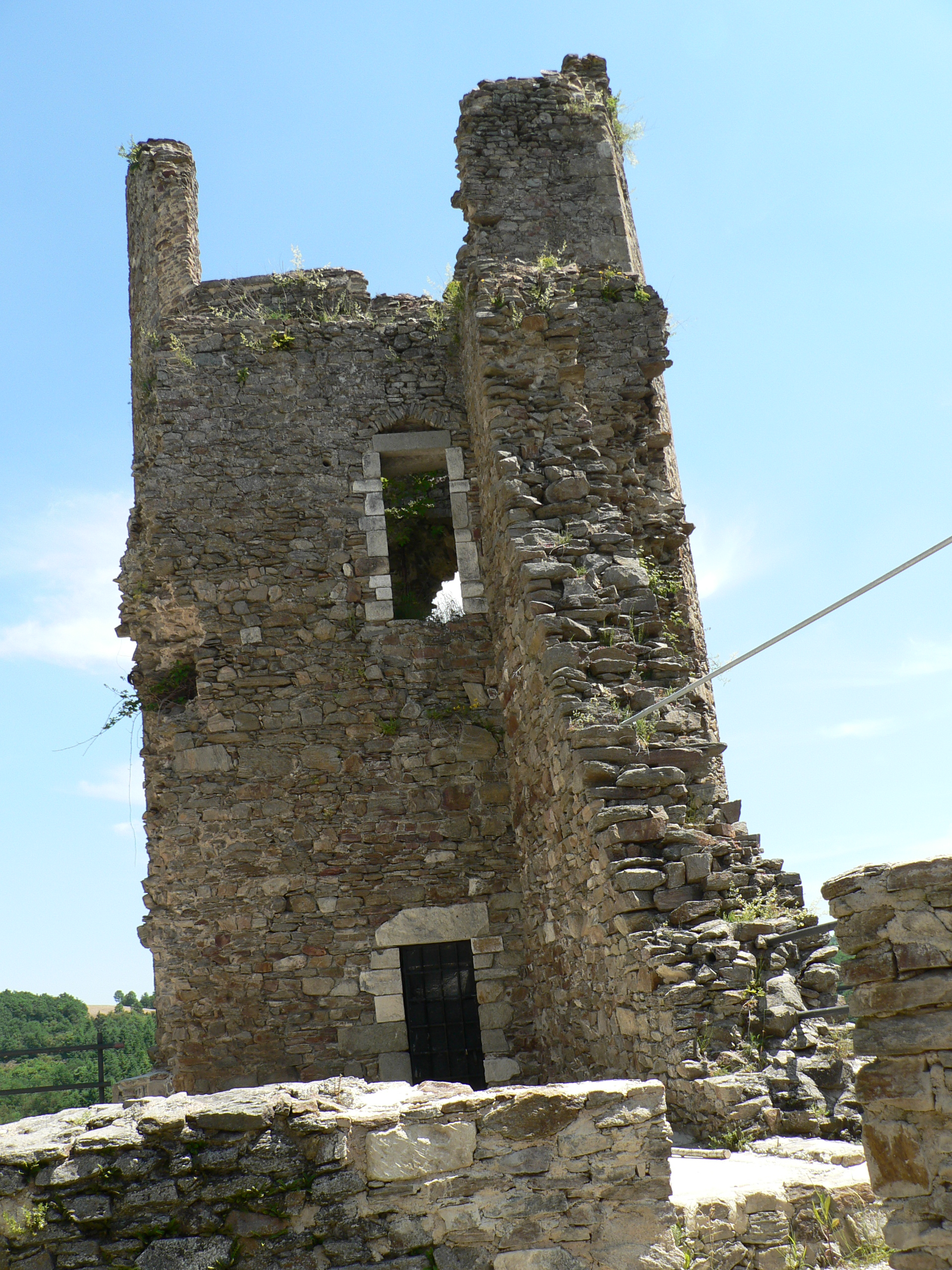

== See also ==
- List of castles in France
