= Saint-Rémy-de-Blot =

- Commune
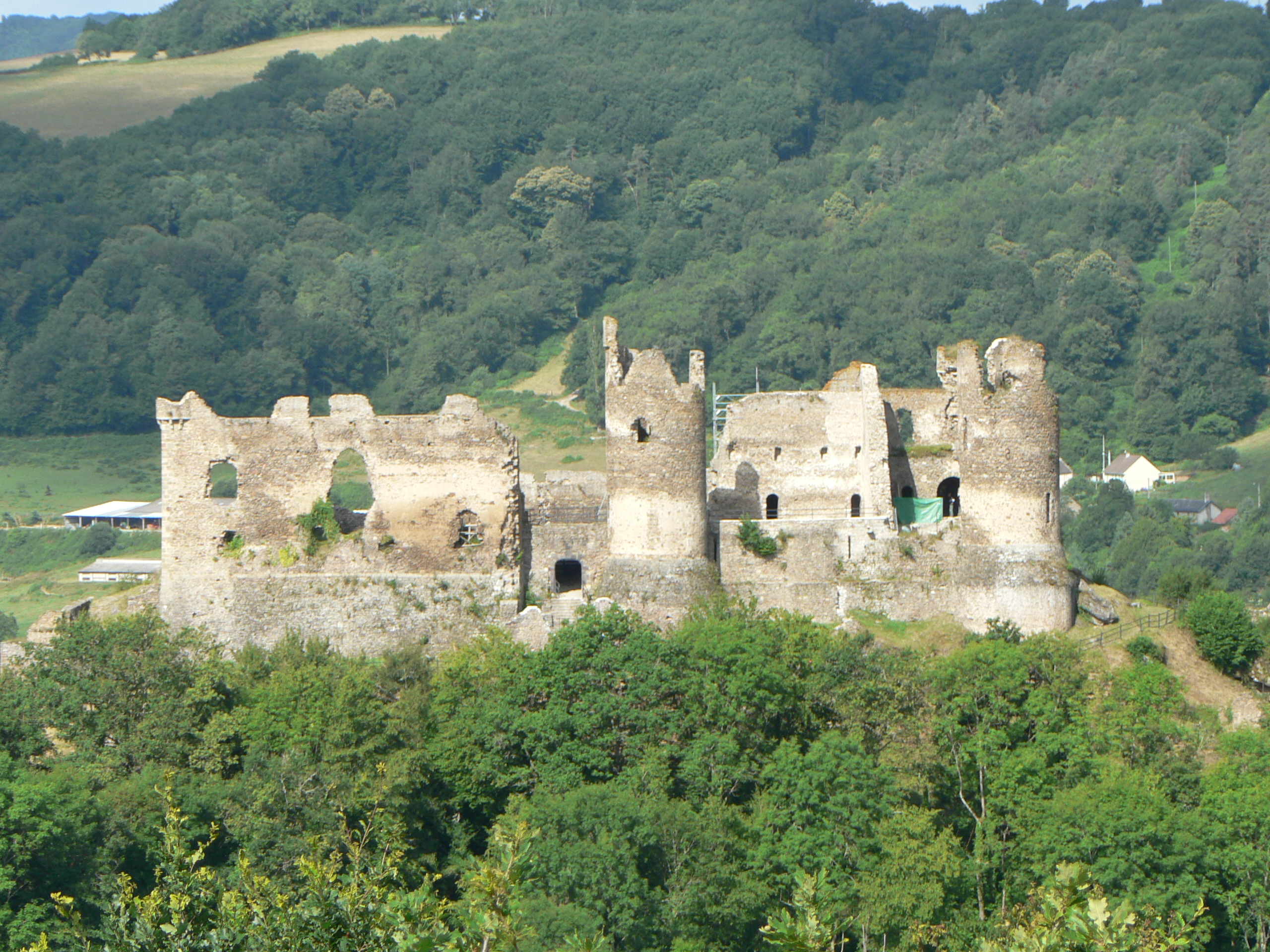
- Château Rocher in Saint-Rémy-de-Blot
- Location of Saint-Rémy-de-Blot
- Location within France Location within Auvergne-Rhône-Alpes
- Coordinates: 46°04′41″N 2°55′53″E
- Country: France
- Region: Auvergne-Rhône-Alpes
- Department: Puy-de-Dôme
- Arrondissement: Riom
- Canton: Saint-Georges-de-Mons
- Intercommunality: CC Combrailles Sioule et Morge

Government
  - Mayor (2026–32): François Roguet
- Area^{1}: 15.22 km^{2} (5.88 sq mi)
- Elevation: 532 m (1,745 ft)
- Highest elevation: 665 m (2,182 ft)
- Lowest elevation: 346 m (1,135 ft)
- Population (2023): 251
  - Density: 16.5/km^{2} (42.7/sq mi)
- Time zone: UTC+01:00 (CET)
  - Summer (DST): UTC+02:00 (CEST)
- INSEE/Postal code: 63391 /63440
- ^{1} French Land Register data, which excludes lakes, ponds, glaciers > 1 km^{2} (0.386 sq mi or 247 acres) and river estuaries.

Saint-Rémy-de-Blot (French pronunciation: [sɛ̃ ʁemi də blo]; Auvergnat: Sent Remesi de Blòt) is a commune in the Puy-de-Dôme department in Auvergne in central France.

== Heritage ==
Château Rocher (originally called "Blot-le-Château") is situated on a 150-meter cliff overlooking the Sioule. Its objective was to monitor the Sioule valley and the Menat bridge, a crossroads between Auvergne and Bourbonnais. The fortress was built at the end of the 11th century at the initiative of Archambaud the Fort, lord of Bourbon. The edification and expansion of the castle continued until the 15th century, but it had lost its strategic importance from the 16th century onwards. It would have been abandoned in the course of the 18th century. Since 1964, the Château Rocher Association has undertaken consolidation. Today, the castle is in ruins. Access to the site is free for part of the year. In July and August, the Château-Rocher Association offers guided tours.
