= Saint Eloy's mines =

Coal mines in France

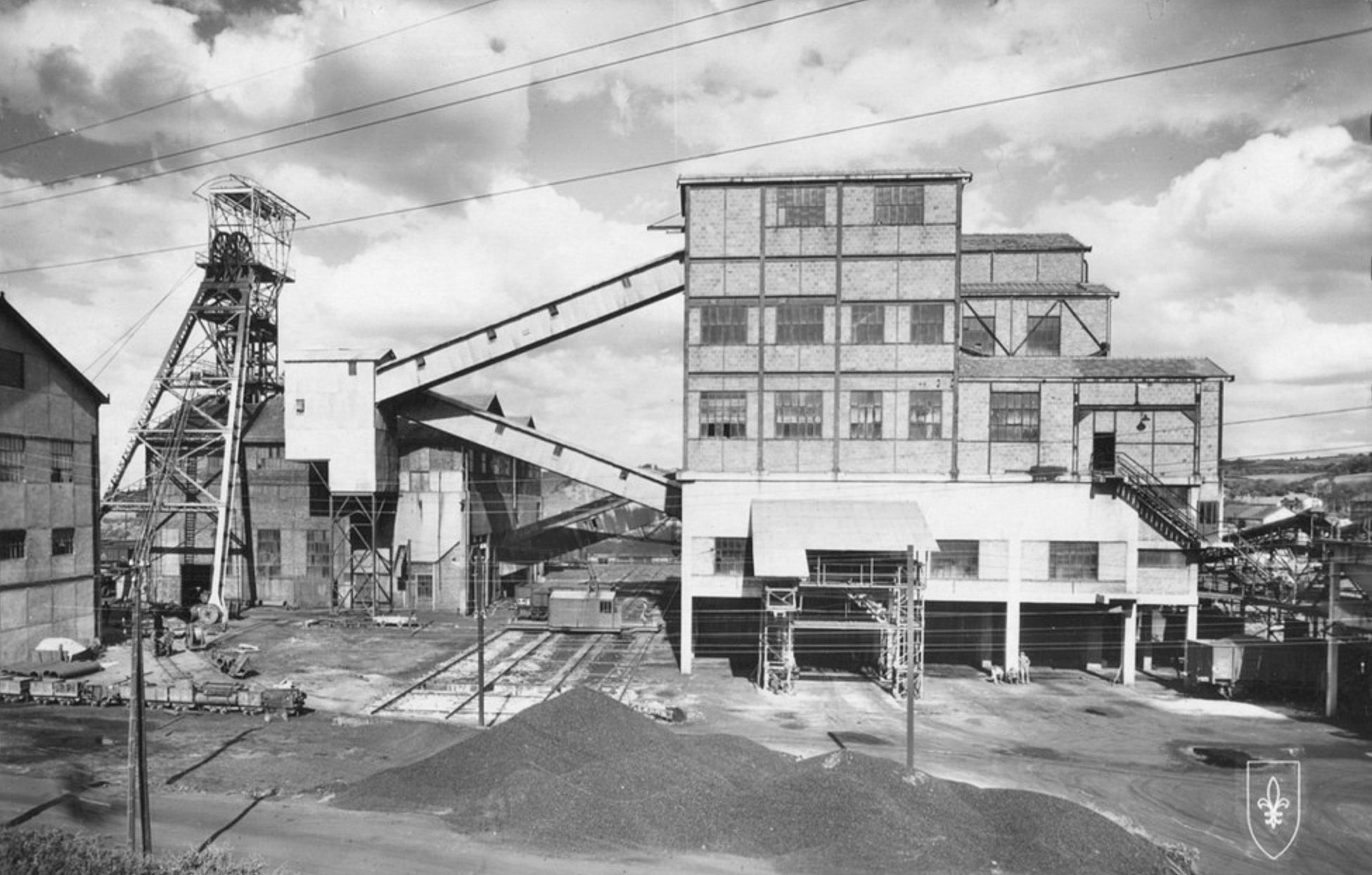
Mine works at Saint-Eloy-Les-Mines

The mines of Saint-Éloy-les-Mines are coal and silver-lead mines located in the town of Saint-Éloy-les-Mines, France and environs. They were constructed in the 18th century during the beginning of industrialization in Combraille, which included:

- the glass industry at Montel-de-Gelat;
- the coal mines of Vernade (Saint-Éloy) and The Peize (Gutters)
- the silver-lead of mines Roignon (Youx) and Mas Boutin (Saint Eloy).

Eighteenth-century France saw the beginnings of industrialization across the entire kingdom. It was also a time when landowners, especially noblemen, were trying to apply physiocratic ideas to change their way of cultivating the soil and making crop rotations by introducing, for example, the cultivation of potatoes and artificial grasslands. Other nobles and wealthy citizens were also trying, sometimes unsuccessfully, to develop new industries, such as farm ores. Some entrepreneurs foresaw the changes that were going to evolve in the 19th century and worked to take advantage of the country's abundance of natural resources.

== The Coal Mines of La Vernade (Saint-Eloy) and La Peize (Gouttieres) ==
The coal mine of Auvergne was already a source of great wealth in the region, owing to the relative ease by which coal could be shipped to Orléans and the cities of Val de Loire and Paris by the Allier since the opening of the Briare Canal, in spite of delays caused by poor quality and by transportation difficulties which arose from time to time. Aside from the power of few blacksmiths of the country, which just had a rare iron to work, the only outlet was the lime kilns in the region of Ébreuil, and the tiles and pottery from the parish of La Pérouze (Gouttieres).

The route was rather difficult, first requiring a climb on the “Plateau des Chevaliers et des Berthons” before going down to the upper valley of Gourdonne. The route then traveled back up to Lachamp, after which it was easier to return down to Ebreuil by the track between the Sioule and the Cèpe. But, despite the relative ease of this wide pathway, if we compare it with the three large routes through the valley of the Sioule: by the bridge of the Bouchet, Châteauneuf and the bridge of Menat, the use horse-drawn carriage was possible, (rather than ox-drawn carriage which is slower and susceptible to fast deterioration), but it’s more or less obvious that pack horses were used to supply surroundings blacksmiths.

== The New Mine ==
During the second half of the 19th century, new deeper mine shafts were opened: mine shafts named Tollin, Laval, Montjoie, Peyroux, the Croizette, Chazal, Michelin Mercier, and Beaudot. The syndicate benefits of the permission to have at their disposal the coal coming from the search in 1897 and asks a concession, which one is opposed the company of Châtillon-Commentry.

== Working conditions ==
In 1884, the exhausting and enslaving nature of miner’s work was brought to national attention by Émile Zola in his novel Germinal where he regarded it as an "impoverishment of the human condition". It was also at this time that Carmaux led strikes from 1892-1895 in Tarn’s coalfield, xxx. He later became a prominent Socialist symbol by acting as the region’s congressman. Numerous movements were initiated by the syndicates at the Saint-Eloy-Les Mines since the end of the Nineteenth Century, with Gilbert Conchon as a minor delegate. He went to London for a congress, with others delegation, in collaboration with the movements of English coalfield.
