= Deneuille-lès-Chantelle =

- Commune
- Coat of arms
- Location of Deneuille-lès-Chantelle
- Location within France Location within Auvergne-Rhône-Alpes
- Coordinates: 46°14′45″N 3°08′51″E
- Country: France
- Region: Auvergne-Rhône-Alpes
- Department: Allier
- Arrondissement: Vichy
- Canton: Gannat
- Intercommunality: Saint-Pourçain Sioule Limagne

Government
  - Mayor (2026–32): Jean-Jacques Kegelart
- Area^{1}: 8.21 km^{2} (3.17 sq mi)
- Elevation: 300 m (980 ft)
- Highest elevation: 372 m (1,220 ft)
- Lowest elevation: 273 m (896 ft)
- Population (2023): 94
  - Density: 11/km^{2} (30/sq mi)
- Time zone: UTC+01:00 (CET)
  - Summer (DST): UTC+02:00 (CEST)
- INSEE/Postal code: 03096 /03140
- ^{1} French Land Register data, which excludes lakes, ponds, glaciers > 1 km^{2} (0.386 sq mi or 247 acres) and river estuaries.

Deneuille-lès-Chantelle (French pronunciation: [dənœj lɛ ʃɑ̃tɛl], literally Deneuille near Chantelle; Occitan: Denuelha de Chantela) is a commune in the Allier department in central France.

== Geography ==
The river Bouble forms all of the commune's southern border.

== Population ==
Historical population
Year	Pop.	±% p.a.
1968	84	—
1975	80	−0.69%
1982	98	+2.94%
1990	80	−2.50%
1999	89	+1.19%
2007	103	+1.84%
2012	94	−1.81%
2017	81	−2.93%
2023	94	+2.51%
Source: INSEE

== See also ==
- Communes of the Allier department
