= Montel-de-Gelat =

- Commune
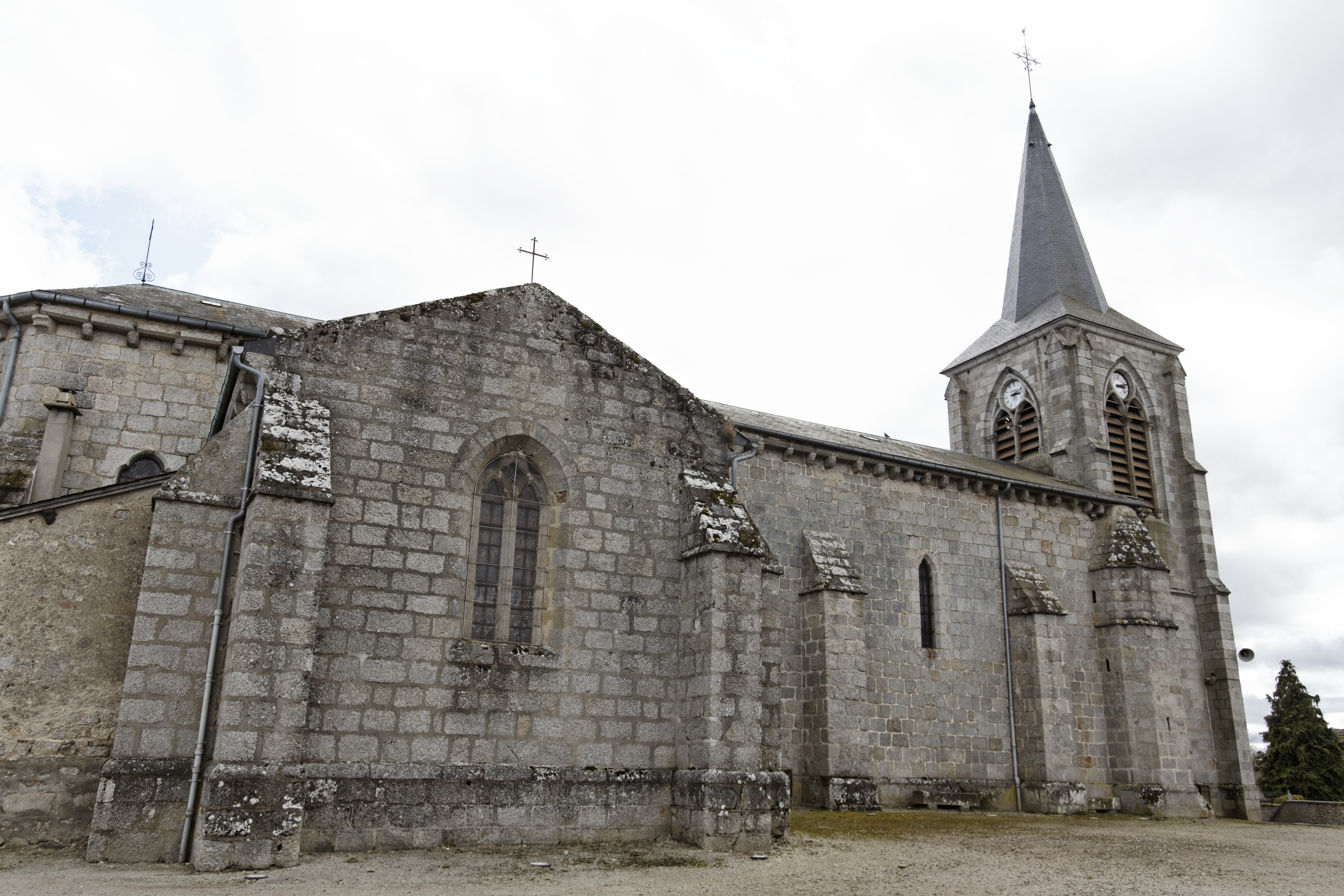
- The church in Montel-de-Gelat

- Coat of arms
- Location of Montel-de-Gelat
- Location within France Location within Auvergne-Rhône-Alpes
- Coordinates: 45°56′13″N 2°34′59″E
- Country: France
- Region: Auvergne-Rhône-Alpes
- Department: Puy-de-Dôme
- Arrondissement: Riom
- Canton: Saint-Ours

Government
  - Mayor (2020–2026): Claude Bourduge
- Area^{1}: 25.02 km^{2} (9.66 sq mi)
- Elevation: 700 m (2,300 ft)
- Highest elevation: 735 m (2,411 ft)
- Lowest elevation: 656 m (2,152 ft)
- Population (2023): 406
  - Density: 16.2/km^{2} (42.0/sq mi)
- Time zone: UTC+01:00 (CET)
  - Summer (DST): UTC+02:00 (CEST)
- INSEE/Postal code: 63237 /63380
- ^{1} French Land Register data, which excludes lakes, ponds, glaciers > 1 km^{2} (0.386 sq mi or 247 acres) and river estuaries.

Montel-de-Gelat (French pronunciation: [mɔ̃tɛl də ʒəla]; Occitan: Le Montelh de Gelat) is a commune in the Puy-de-Dôme department in Auvergne in central France.

== See also ==
- Communes of the Puy-de-Dôme department
- Saint Eloy's mines
