= Target, Allier =

Target
- Commune
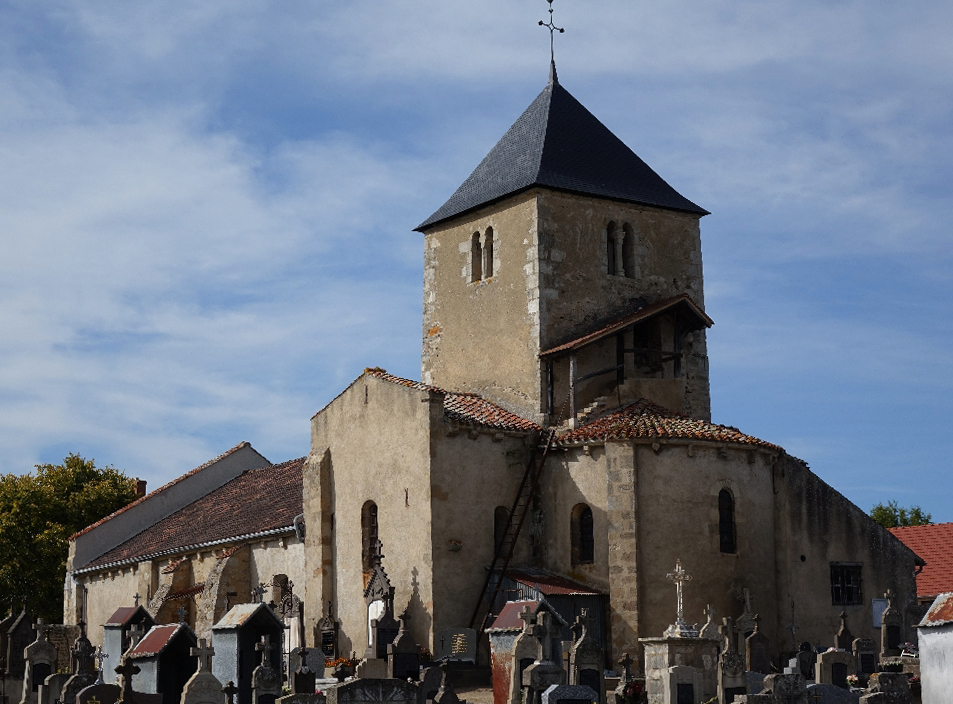
- The church in Target
- Location of Target
- Location within France Location within Auvergne-Rhône-Alpes
- Coordinates: 46°17′25″N 3°03′44″E
- Country: France
- Region: Auvergne-Rhône-Alpes
- Department: Allier
- Arrondissement: Vichy
- Canton: Gannat
- Intercommunality: Saint-Pourçain Sioule Limagne

Government
  - Mayor (2026–32): Jacques Thuizat
- Area^{1}: 26.47 km^{2} (10.22 sq mi)
- Elevation: 434 m (1,424 ft)
- Highest elevation: 459 m (1,506 ft)
- Lowest elevation: 315 m (1,033 ft)
- Population (2023): 244
  - Density: 9.22/km^{2} (23.9/sq mi)
- Time zone: UTC+01:00 (CET)
  - Summer (DST): UTC+02:00 (CEST)
- INSEE/Postal code: 03277 /03140
- ^{1} French Land Register data, which excludes lakes, ponds, glaciers > 1 km^{2} (0.386 sq mi or 247 acres) and river estuaries.

Target (French pronunciation: [taʁʒɛ]; Occitan: Targiac) is a commune in the Allier department in Auvergne-Rhône-Alpes in central France.

== Geography ==
The Venant, a tributary of the Bouble, forms all of the commune's northwestern border, then flows into the Bouble, which forms all of its southwestern border.

== Population ==
Historical population
Year	Pop.	±% p.a.
1968	401	—
1975	345	−2.13%
1982	270	−3.44%
1990	264	−0.28%
1999	249	−0.65%
2007	257	+0.40%
2012	283	+1.95%
2017	254	−2.14%
2023	244	−0.67%
Source: INSEE

== See also ==
- Communes of the Allier department
