= Echassières mine =

Tantalum mine in France

Coordinates: 46.179°N 2.955°E

- Interactive map of Echassières mine
- Location: Allier, France
- Products: Tantalum

The Echassières mine is a large mine located near the town of Échassières, in the central part of France in Allier. Echassières represents one of the largest tantalum reserves in France having estimated reserves of 167 million tonnes of ore grading 0.012% tantalum.
