= Bouble =

River in France

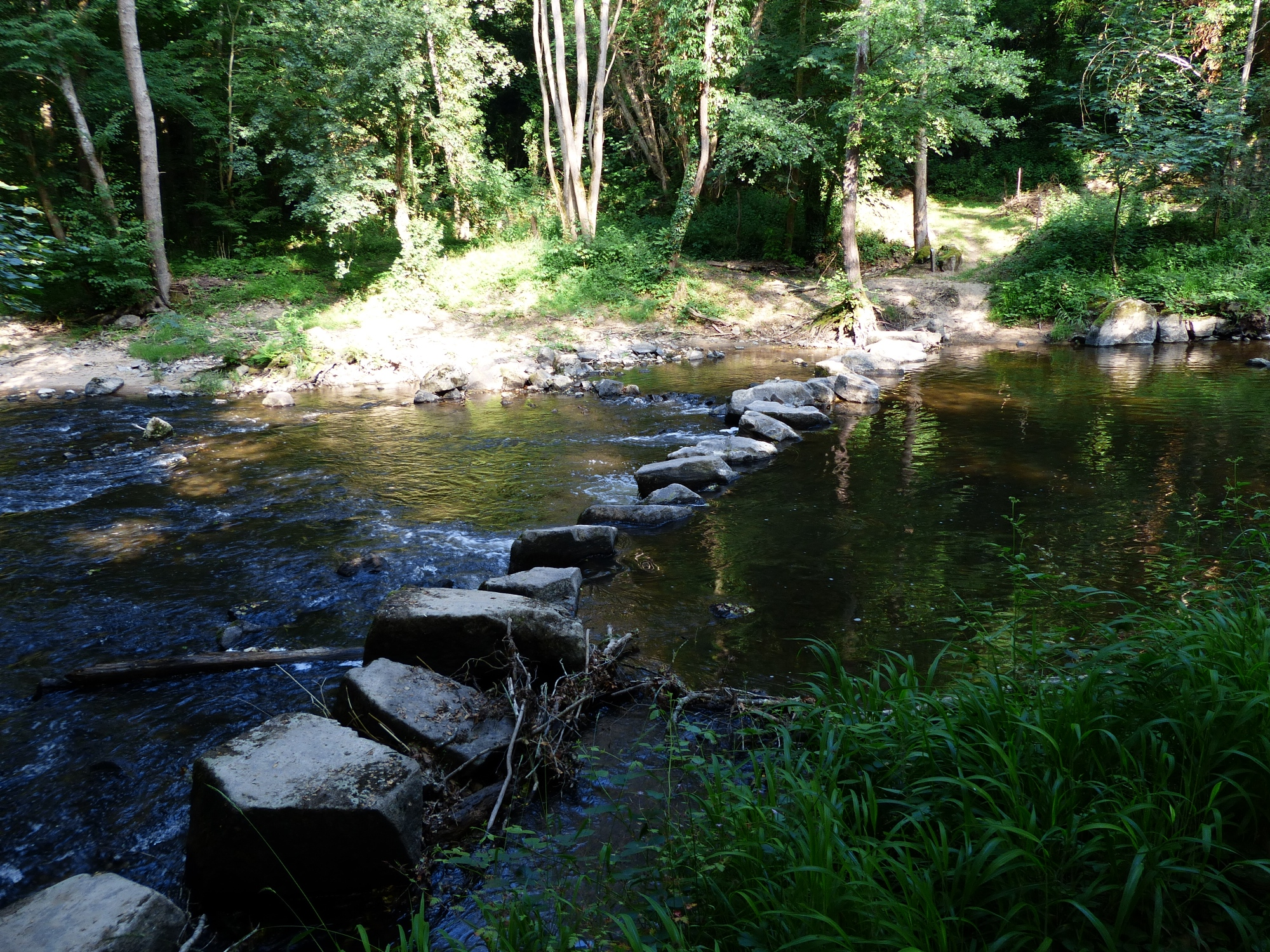

- Location within France Location within Auvergne-Rhône-Alpes

Location
- Country: France

Physical characteristics
- Source
  - location: Gouttières
  - coordinates: 46°04′52″N 02°47′26″E
  - elevation: 620 m (2,030 ft)
- Mouth
  - location: Sioule
  - coordinates: 46°17′02″N 03°16′28″E
  - elevation: 235 m (771 ft)
- Length: 65.4 km (40.6 mi)
- Basin size: 555 km^{2} (214 sq mi)
- Discharge
  - average: 3.97 m^{3}/s (140 cu ft/s)

Basin features
- Progression: Sioule→ Allier→ Loire→ Atlantic Ocean

The Bouble (French pronunciation: [bubl]) is a 65.4-kilometre (40.6 mi) long river in the Allier and Puy-de-Dôme departments in south central France. Its source is at Gouttières. Flowing generally northeast, the Bouble drains an area of 555 km^{2} (214 sq mi). It is a left tributary of the Sioule into which it flows between Saint-Pourçain-sur-Sioule and Bayet.

== Departments and communes along its course ==
This list is ordered from source to mouth:

- Puy-de-Dôme: Gouttières, Teilhet, Youx, Saint-Éloy-les-Mines, Moureuille, Durmignat
- Allier: Échassières
- Puy-de-Dôme: Lapeyrouse
- Allier: Louroux-de-Bouble, Vernusse, Chirat-l'Église, Target, Monestier, Bellenaves, Chantelle, Deneuille-lès-Chantelle, Fourilles, Chareil-Cintrat, Bayet, Saint-Pourçain-sur-Sioule
