= Chirat-l'Église =

- Commune
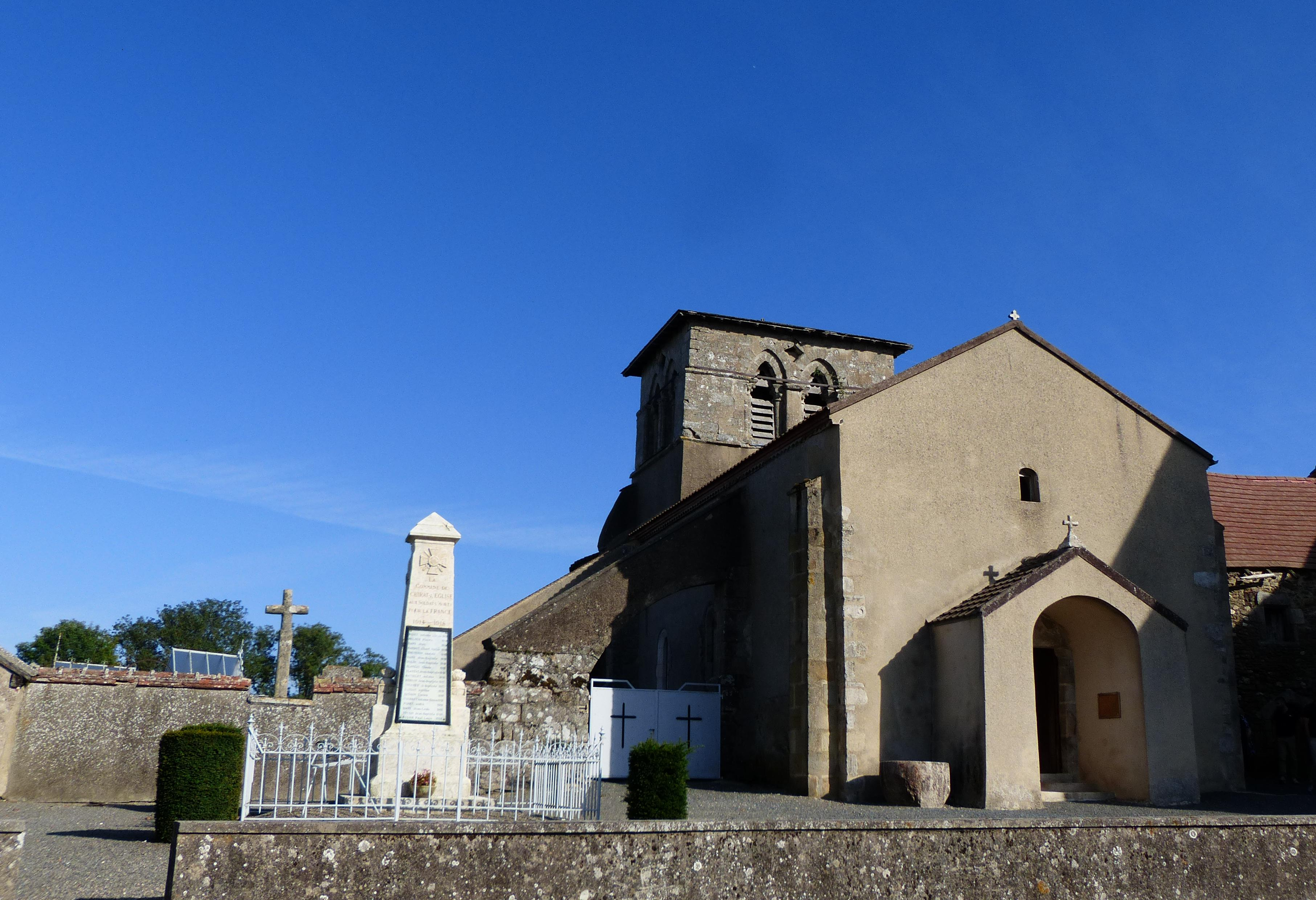
- The church in Chirat-l'Eglise
- Location of Chirat-l'Église
- Location within France Location within Auvergne-Rhône-Alpes
- Coordinates: 46°14′38″N 3°02′07″E
- Country: France
- Region: Auvergne-Rhône-Alpes
- Department: Allier
- Arrondissement: Vichy
- Canton: Gannat
- Intercommunality: Saint-Pourçain Sioule Limagne

Government
  - Mayor (2026–32): Philippe Tallaud
- Area^{1}: 18.48 km^{2} (7.14 sq mi)
- Elevation: 450 m (1,480 ft)
- Highest elevation: 494 m (1,621 ft)
- Lowest elevation: 311 m (1,020 ft)
- Population (2023): 129
  - Density: 6.98/km^{2} (18.1/sq mi)
- Time zone: UTC+01:00 (CET)
  - Summer (DST): UTC+02:00 (CEST)
- INSEE/Postal code: 03077 /03330
- ^{1} French Land Register data, which excludes lakes, ponds, glaciers > 1 km^{2} (0.386 sq mi or 247 acres) and river estuaries.

Chirat-l'Église (French pronunciation: [ʃiʁa leɡliz]; Occitan: Chirac de la Glèisa) is a commune in the Allier department in Auvergne in central France.

== Geography ==
The river Bouble forms all of the commune's northwestern border and most of its northeastern border.

== Population ==
Historical population
Year	Pop.	±% p.a.
1968	221	—
1975	162	−4.34%
1982	166	+0.35%
1990	129	−3.10%
1999	119	−0.89%
2007	134	+1.50%
2012	132	−0.30%
2017	128	−0.61%
2023	129	+0.13%
Source: INSEE

== See also ==
- Communes of the Allier department
