= Saint-Éloy-les-Mines =

- Commune
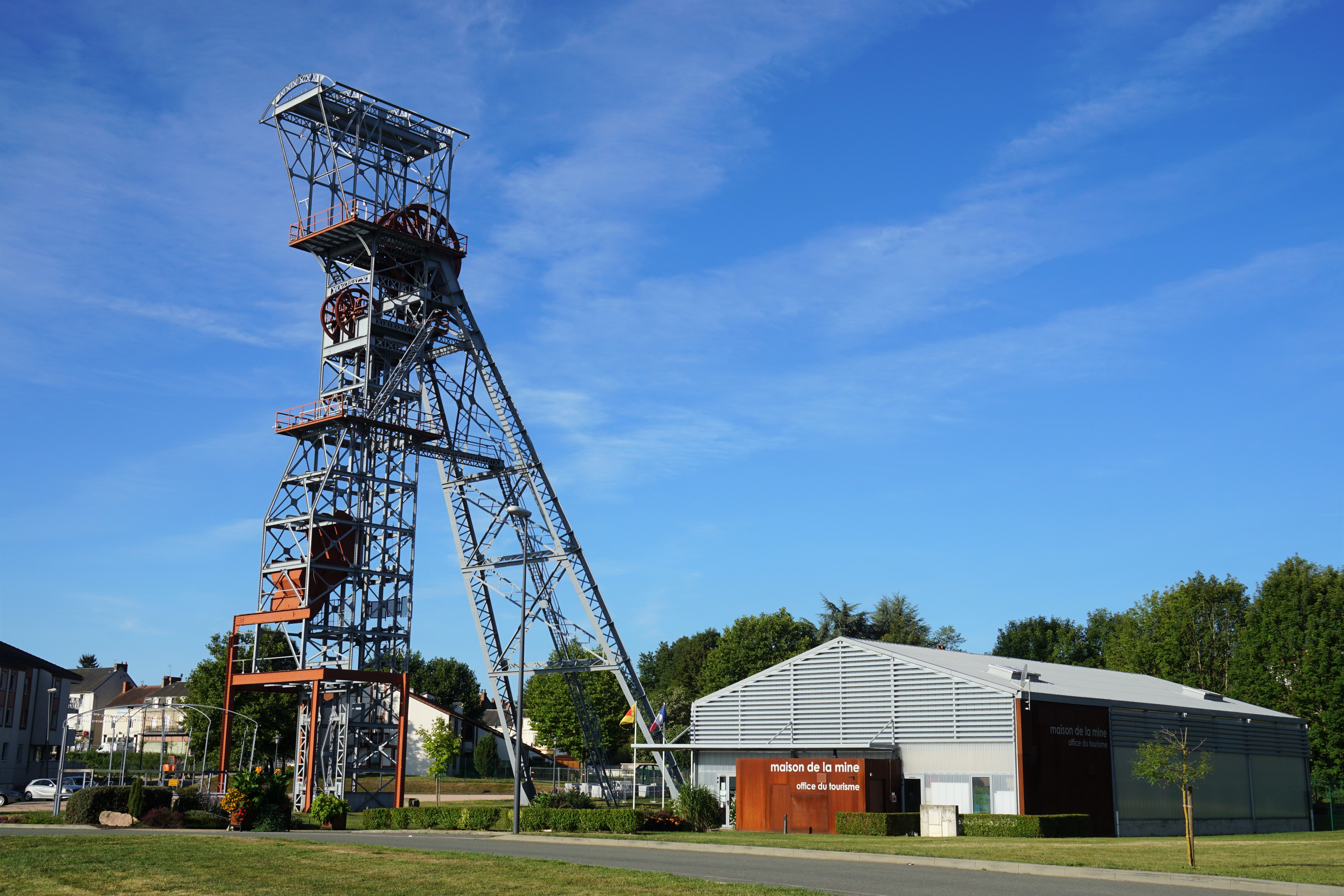
- Former Saint-Joseph mine shaft

- Coat of arms
- Location of Saint-Éloy-les-Mines
- Location within France Location within Auvergne-Rhône-Alpes
- Coordinates: 46°09′41″N 2°50′05″E
- Country: France
- Region: Auvergne-Rhône-Alpes
- Department: Puy-de-Dôme
- Arrondissement: Riom
- Canton: Saint-Éloy-les-Mines
- Intercommunality: CC Pays de Saint-Éloy

Government
  - Mayor (2020–2026): Anthony Palermo
- Area^{1}: 22.11 km^{2} (8.54 sq mi)
- Elevation: 500 m (1,600 ft)
- Highest elevation: 649 m (2,129 ft)
- Lowest elevation: 443 m (1,453 ft)
- Population (2023): 3,480
  - Density: 157/km^{2} (408/sq mi)
- Demonym: Eloysiens / Eloysiennes
- Time zone: UTC+01:00 (CET)
  - Summer (DST): UTC+02:00 (CEST)
- INSEE/Postal code: 63338 /63700
- ^{1} French Land Register data, which excludes lakes, ponds, glaciers > 1 km^{2} (0.386 sq mi or 247 acres) and river estuaries.

Saint-Éloy-les-Mines (French pronunciation: [sɛ̃t‿elwa le min]; Auvergnat: Sant Alòi de las Minas) is a commune in the Puy-de-Dôme department in Auvergne in central France.

== Geography ==
The river Bouble flows north-northeastward through the commune.

== Population ==
Historical population
Year	Pop.	±% p.a.
1968	6,316	—
1975	5,646	−1.59%
1982	5,293	−0.92%
1990	4,721	−1.42%
1999	4,134	−1.46%
2007	3,817	−0.99%
2012	3,628	−1.01%
2017	3,709	+0.44%
2023	3,480	−1.06%
Source: INSEE

== Bibliography ==
- Chardonnet, Sylvain (2026). "Les photographes arméniens de Saint-Éloy-les-Mines (années 1930)". Bulletin historique et scientifique de l'Auvergne (in French). CXXIV/1 (2023). Clermont-Ferrand: Académie des sciences, belles-lettres et arts de Clermont-Ferrand.

== See also ==
- Communes of the Puy-de-Dôme department
- Saint Eloy's mines
