= Échassières =

- Commune
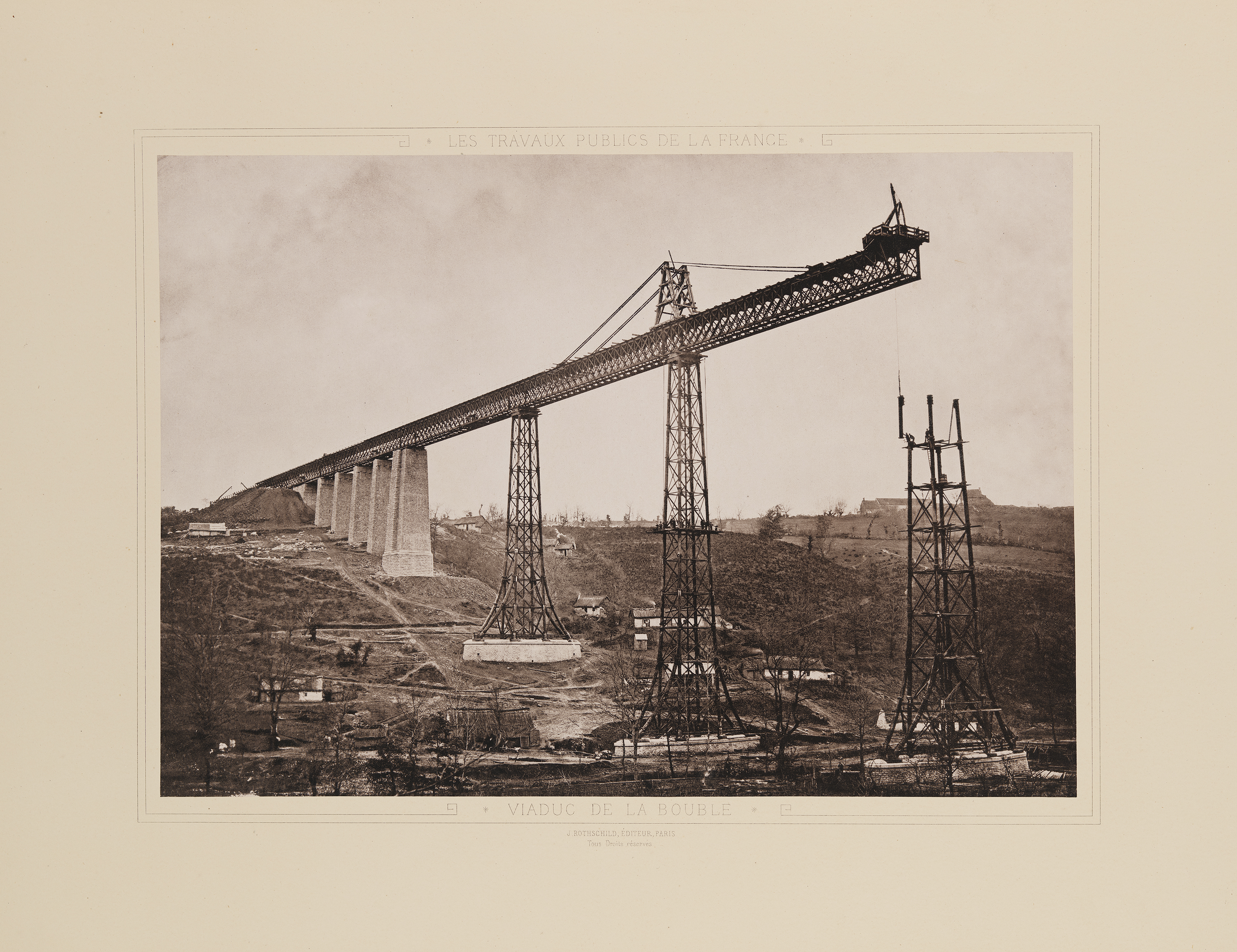
- The La Bouble Viaduct under construction
- Location of Échassières
- Location within France Location within Auvergne-Rhône-Alpes
- Coordinates: 46°11′07″N 2°56′07″E
- Country: France
- Region: Auvergne-Rhône-Alpes
- Department: Allier
- Arrondissement: Vichy
- Canton: Gannat
- Intercommunality: Saint-Pourçain Sioule Limagne

Government
  - Mayor (2026–32): Frédéric Dalaigre
- Area^{1}: 23.4 km^{2} (9.0 sq mi)
- Elevation: 620 m (2,030 ft)
- Highest elevation: 765 m (2,510 ft)
- Lowest elevation: 390 m (1,280 ft)
- Population (2023): 364
  - Density: 15.6/km^{2} (40.3/sq mi)
- Time zone: UTC+01:00 (CET)
  - Summer (DST): UTC+02:00 (CEST)
- INSEE/Postal code: 03108 /03330
- Website: echassieres.com
- ^{1} French Land Register data, which excludes lakes, ponds, glaciers > 1 km^{2} (0.386 sq mi or 247 acres) and river estuaries.

Échassières (French pronunciation: [eʃasjɛʁ]; Occitan: Eschaseiras) is a commune in the Allier department in central France.

== Geography ==
The river Bouble forms most of the commune's northwestern border.

== Population ==
Historical population
Year	Pop.	±% p.a.
1968	602	—
1975	489	−2.93%
1982	408	−2.55%
1990	349	−1.93%
1999	380	+0.95%
2007	387	+0.23%
2012	396	+0.46%
2017	385	−0.56%
2023	364	−0.93%
Source: INSEE

== See also ==
- Communes of the Allier department
- Echassières mine
