= Bellenaves =

- Commune
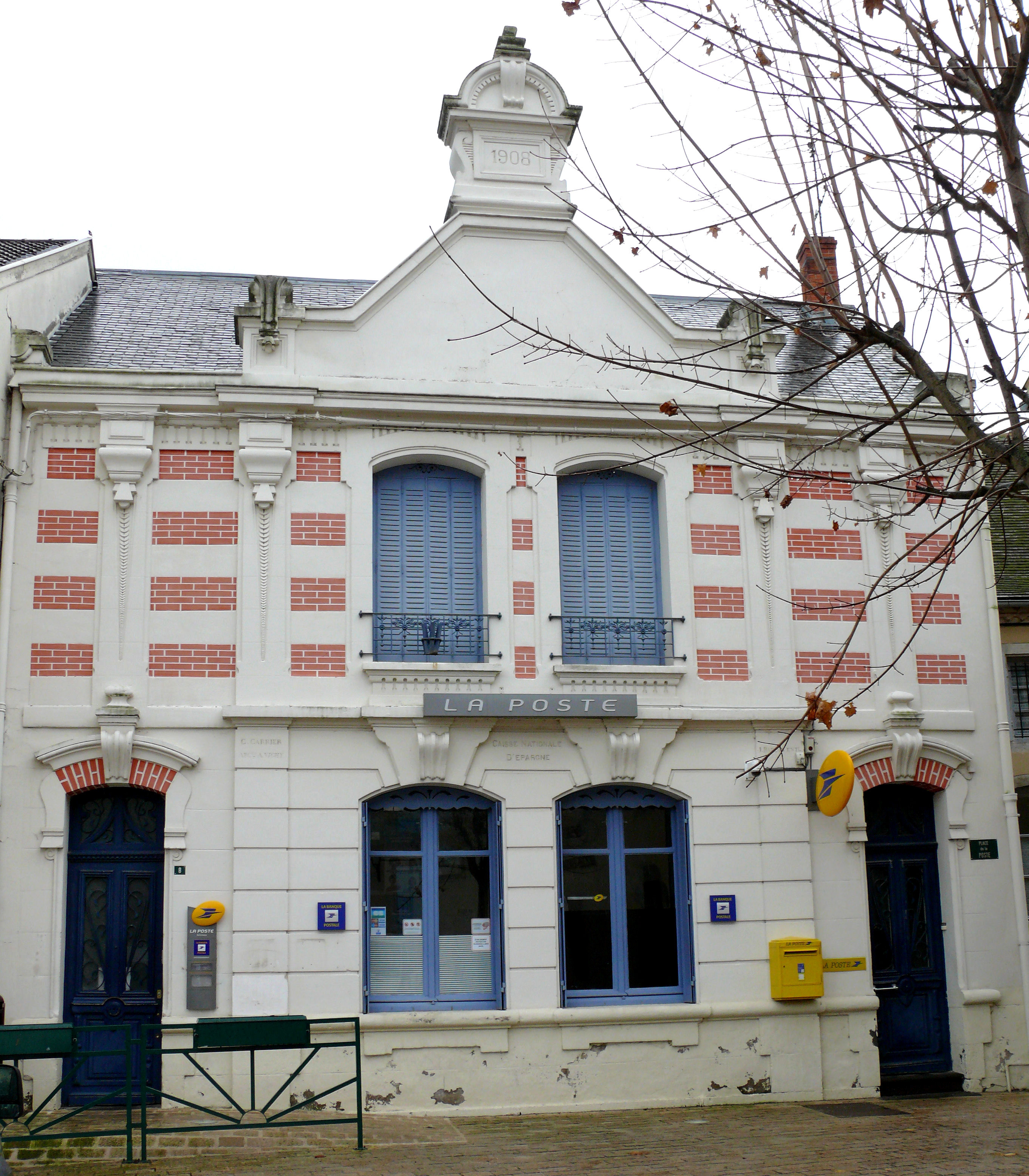
- Post office
- Location of Bellenaves
- Location within France Location within Auvergne-Rhône-Alpes
- Coordinates: 46°12′05″N 3°04′51″E
- Country: France
- Region: Auvergne-Rhône-Alpes
- Department: Allier
- Arrondissement: Vichy
- Canton: Gannat
- Intercommunality: Saint-Pourçain Sioule Limagne

Government
  - Mayor (2026–32): Eric Barthoux
- Area^{1}: 34.88 km^{2} (13.47 sq mi)
- Elevation: 395 m (1,296 ft)
- Highest elevation: 543 m (1,781 ft)
- Lowest elevation: 297 m (974 ft)
- Population (2023): 983
  - Density: 28.2/km^{2} (73.0/sq mi)
- Time zone: UTC+01:00 (CET)
  - Summer (DST): UTC+02:00 (CEST)
- INSEE/Postal code: 03022 /03330
- ^{1} French Land Register data, which excludes lakes, ponds, glaciers > 1 km^{2} (0.386 sq mi or 247 acres) and river estuaries.

Bellenaves (French pronunciation: [bɛlnav]; Occitan: Balanava) is a commune in the Allier department in central France.

== Geography ==
The river Bouble forms part of the commune's northeastern border.

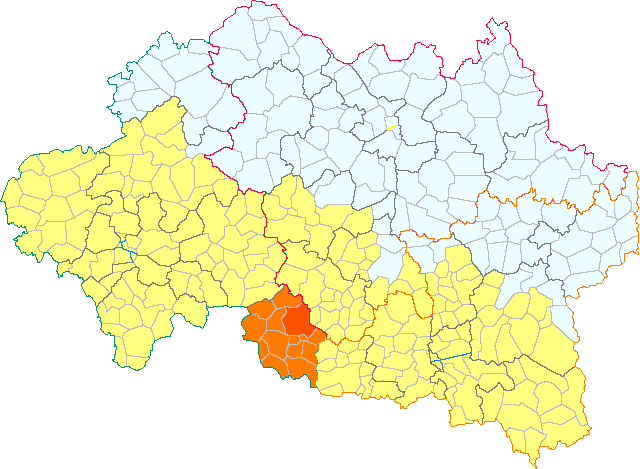
Bellenaves in the former canton of Ébreuil (before March 2015).

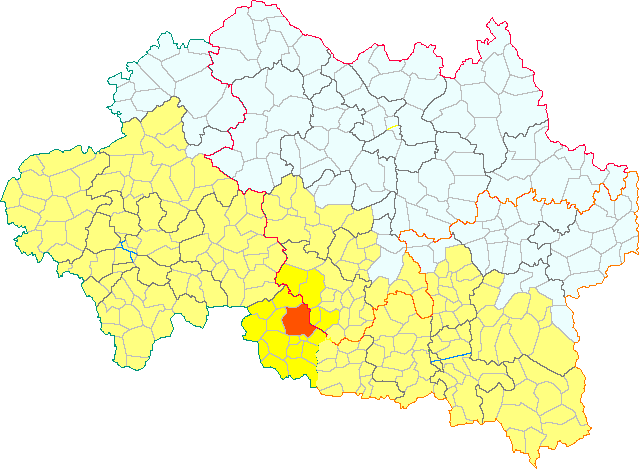
Bellenaves in the former Sioule, Colettes et Bouble intercommunality.

== Population ==
Inhabitants are called Bellenavois and Bellenavoises in French.

Historical population
Year	Pop.	±% p.a.
1968	1,196	—
1975	1,118	−0.96%
1982	1,104	−0.18%
1990	1,006	−1.16%
1999	1,003	−0.03%
2007	1,041	+0.47%
2012	1,017	−0.47%
2017	1,020	+0.06%
2023	983	−0.61%
Source: INSEE

== See also ==
- Communes of the Allier department
