= Louroux-de-Bouble =

- Commune
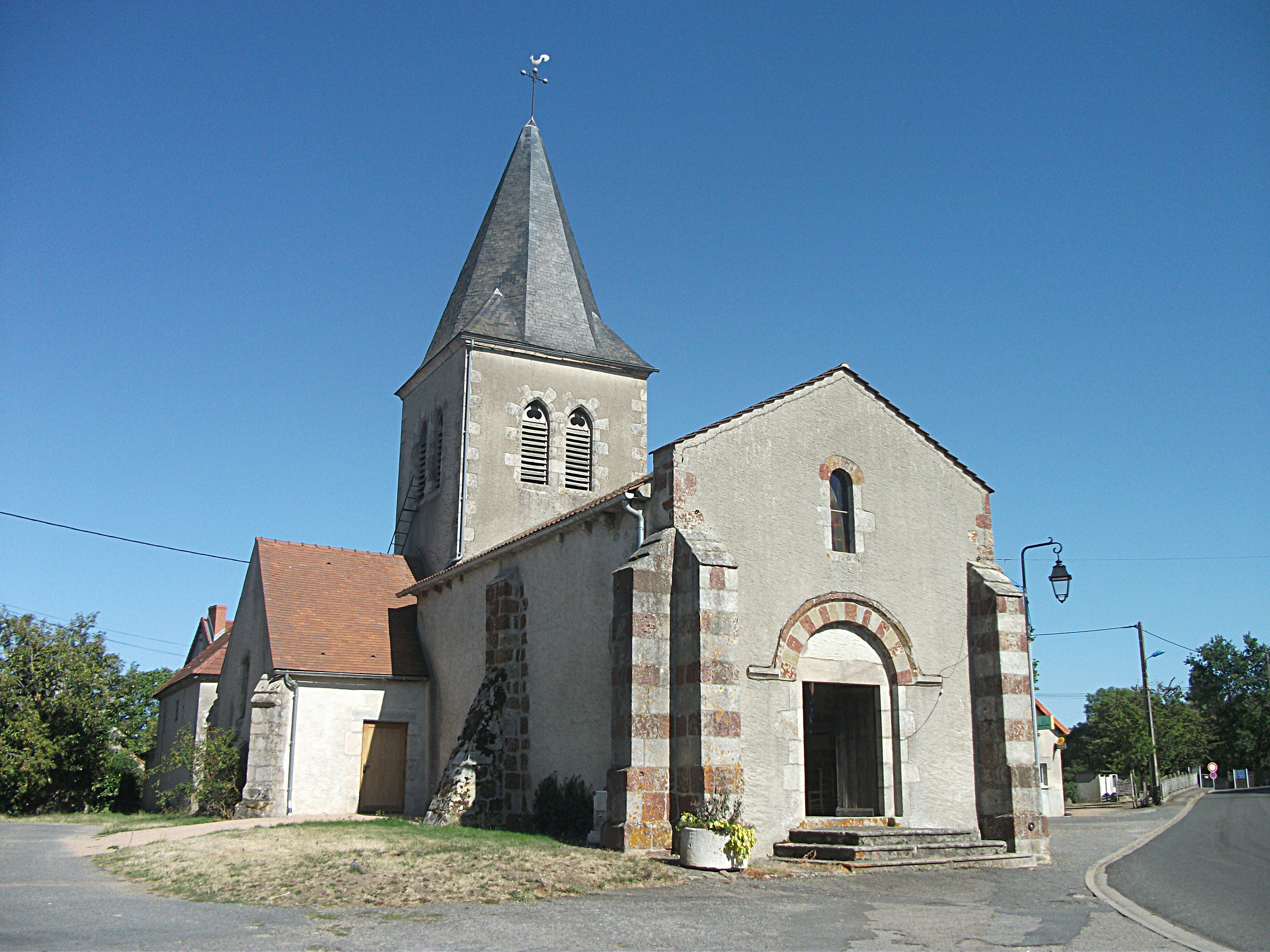
- Church St. Laurent

- Coat of arms
- Location of Louroux-de-Bouble
- Location within France Location within Auvergne-Rhône-Alpes
- Coordinates: 46°13′36″N 2°58′43″E
- Country: France
- Region: Auvergne-Rhône-Alpes
- Department: Allier
- Arrondissement: Vichy
- Canton: Gannat
- Intercommunality: Saint-Pourçain Sioule Limagne

Government
  - Mayor (2026–32): Arnaud Debrade
- Area^{1}: 16.87 km^{2} (6.51 sq mi)
- Elevation: 500 m (1,600 ft)
- Highest elevation: 550 m (1,800 ft)
- Lowest elevation: 357 m (1,171 ft)
- Population (2023): 226
  - Density: 13.4/km^{2} (34.7/sq mi)
- Time zone: UTC+01:00 (CET)
  - Summer (DST): UTC+02:00 (CEST)
- INSEE/Postal code: 03152 /03330
- ^{1} French Land Register data, which excludes lakes, ponds, glaciers > 1 km^{2} (0.386 sq mi or 247 acres) and river estuaries.

Louroux-de-Bouble (French pronunciation: [luʁu də bubl], literally Louroux of Bouble; Occitan: Luros-de-Bobla) is a commune in the Allier department in central France.

== Geography ==
The river Bouble flows northeast through the western part of the commune and forms part of its northern border.

== Population ==
Historical population
Year	Pop.	±% p.a.
1968	403	—
1975	339	−2.44%
1982	303	−1.59%
1990	268	−1.52%
1999	283	+0.61%
2007	291	+0.35%
2012	268	−1.63%
2017	239	−2.26%
2023	226	−0.93%
Source: INSEE

== See also ==
- Communes of the Allier department
