= Monestier, Allier =

Monestier
- Commune
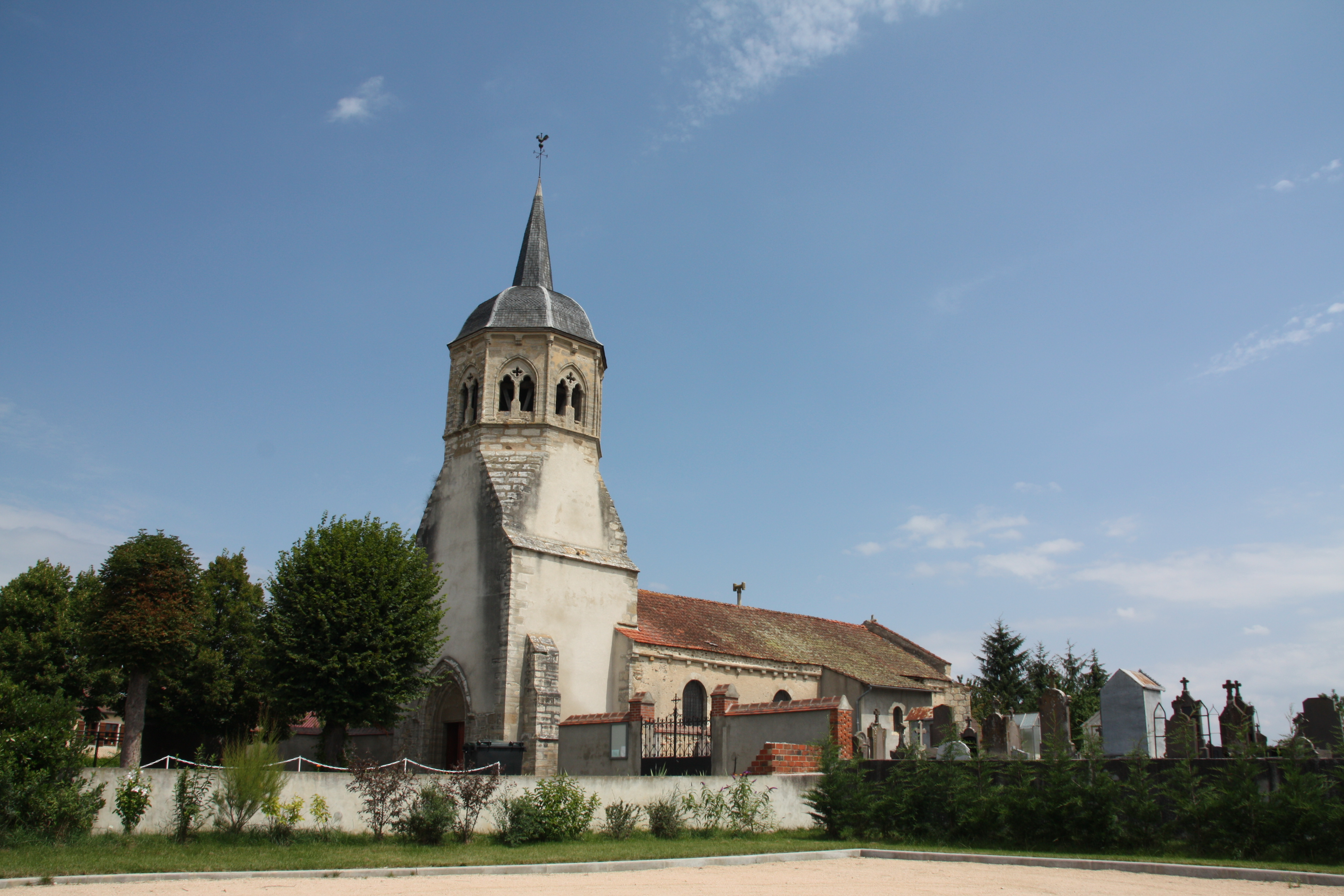
- The church in Monestier
- Location of Monestier
- Location within France Location within Auvergne-Rhône-Alpes
- Coordinates: 46°15′22″N 3°06′51″E
- Country: France
- Region: Auvergne-Rhône-Alpes
- Department: Allier
- Arrondissement: Vichy
- Canton: Gannat
- Intercommunality: Saint-Pourçain Sioule Limagne

Government
  - Mayor (2026–32): Chantal Chatet-Auclair
- Area^{1}: 29.68 km^{2} (11.46 sq mi)
- Elevation: 323 m (1,060 ft)
- Highest elevation: 413 m (1,355 ft)
- Lowest elevation: 290 m (950 ft)
- Population (2023): 291
  - Density: 9.80/km^{2} (25.4/sq mi)
- Time zone: UTC+01:00 (CET)
  - Summer (DST): UTC+02:00 (CEST)
- INSEE/Postal code: 03175 /03140
- ^{1} French Land Register data, which excludes lakes, ponds, glaciers > 1 km^{2} (0.386 sq mi or 247 acres) and river estuaries.

Monestier (French pronunciation: [mɔnɛstje]) is a commune in the Allier department in central France.

== Geography ==
The river Bouble forms most of the commune's southwestern border, then flows east through its southern part.

== Population ==
Historical population
| Year | Pop. | ±% p.a. |
|---|---|---|
| 1968 | 437 | — |
| 1975 | 359 | −2.77% |
| 1982 | 274 | −3.79% |
| 1990 | 282 | +0.36% |
| 1999 | 266 | −0.65% |
| 2007 | 268 | +0.09% |
| 2012 | 293 | +1.80% |
| 2017 | 282 | −0.76% |
| 2023 | 291 | +0.52% |
Source: INSEE

== See also ==
- Communes of the Allier department
