= Lucy Bayet =

Australian fashion model

- Occupation: Model

Lucy Bayet is an Australian fashion model. She is one of "Australia’s leading commercial models working in UK and European markets including MaxFactor, Triumph, Bravissimo, Olay, Nutrimetics, Fiat and many other brands."

== Biography ==
Bayet was discovered by agency, Finesse Models Australia, at the age of 14. At age 17, she left Adelaide and moved to Sydney to pursue modelling contracts. She is represented by Harry's Model Management, Clyne Models, IMG Models - Paris, Début Management, and The Hive Management.

In 2010, Bayet was diagnosed with Hodgkin's lymphoma. In 2011, she entered remission.

In 2013, Bayet became the face of the 2013 Adelaide Fashion Festival.
