= Fourilles =

- Commune
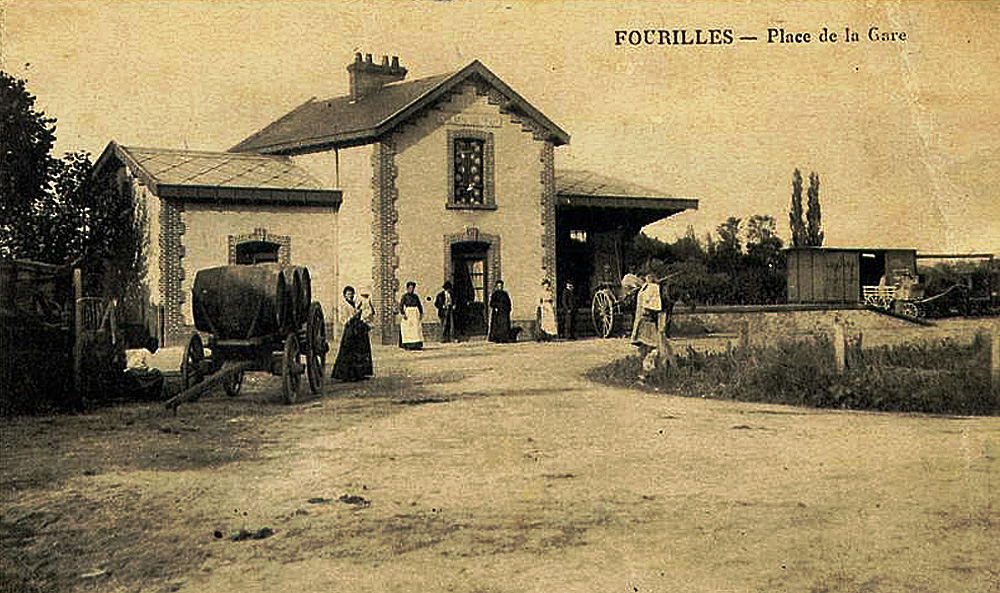
- The railway station in Fourilles, in the early 20th century

- Coat of arms
- Location of Fourilles
- Location within France Location within Auvergne-Rhône-Alpes
- Coordinates: 46°14′33″N 3°11′45″E
- Country: France
- Region: Auvergne-Rhône-Alpes
- Department: Allier
- Arrondissement: Vichy
- Canton: Gannat

Government
  - Mayor (2026–32): Michel Chatet
- Area^{1}: 6.98 km^{2} (2.69 sq mi)
- Elevation: 260 m (850 ft)
- Highest elevation: 330 m (1,080 ft)
- Lowest elevation: 252 m (827 ft)
- Population (2023): 195
  - Density: 27.9/km^{2} (72.4/sq mi)
- Time zone: UTC+01:00 (CET)
  - Summer (DST): UTC+02:00 (CEST)
- INSEE/Postal code: 03116 /03140
- ^{1} French Land Register data, which excludes lakes, ponds, glaciers > 1 km^{2} (0.386 sq mi or 247 acres) and river estuaries.

Fourilles (French pronunciation: [fuʁij]; Occitan: Forilhas) is a commune in the Allier department in central France.

== Geography ==
The river Bouble flows northeast through the northern part of the commune.

== Population ==
Historical population
Year	Pop.	±% p.a.
1968	264	—
1975	237	−1.53%
1982	198	−2.54%
1990	194	−0.25%
1999	188	−0.35%
2007	205	+1.09%
2012	206	+0.10%
2017	195	−1.09%
2023	195	+0.00%
Source: INSEE

== See also ==
- Communes of the Allier department
