= Saint-Pourçain-sur-Sioule =

- Commune
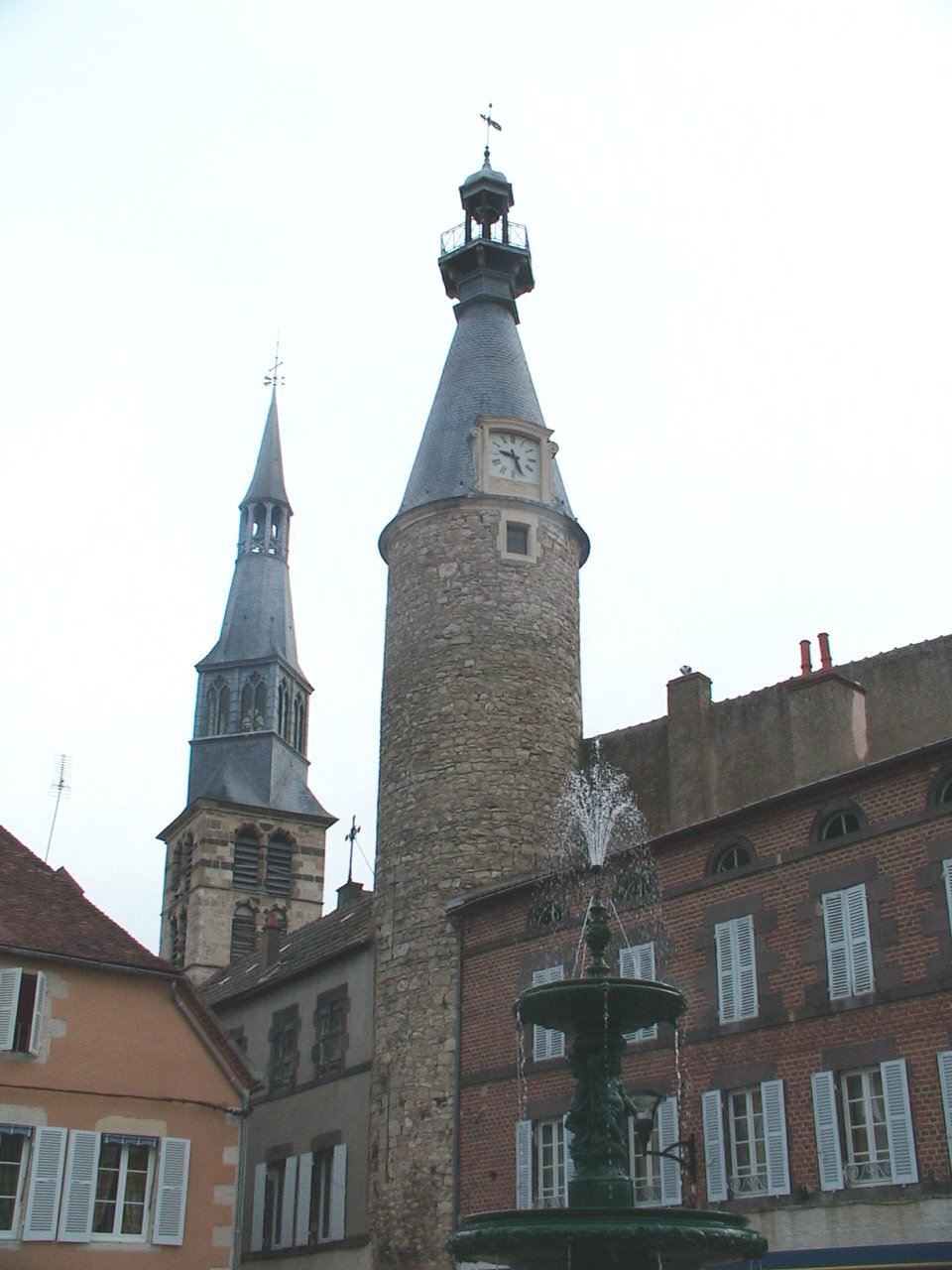
- The belfry of the church and the clock tower

- Coat of arms
- Location of Saint-Pourçain-sur-Sioule
- Location within France Location within Auvergne-Rhône-Alpes
- Coordinates: 46°18′30″N 3°17′24″E
- Country: France
- Region: Auvergne-Rhône-Alpes
- Department: Allier
- Arrondissement: Vichy
- Canton: Saint-Pourçain-sur-Sioule
- Intercommunality: Saint-Pourçain Sioule Limagne

Government
  - Mayor (2026–32): Emmanuel Ferrand
- Area^{1}: 35.67 km^{2} (13.77 sq mi)
- Elevation: 237 m (778 ft)
- Highest elevation: 306 m (1,004 ft)
- Lowest elevation: 226 m (741 ft)
- Population (2023): 4,884
  - Density: 136.9/km^{2} (354.6/sq mi)
- Time zone: UTC+01:00 (CET)
  - Summer (DST): UTC+02:00 (CEST)
- INSEE/Postal code: 03254 /03500
- ^{1} French Land Register data, which excludes lakes, ponds, glaciers > 1 km^{2} (0.386 sq mi or 247 acres) and river estuaries.

Saint-Pourçain-sur-Sioule (French pronunciation: [sɛ̃ puʁsɛ̃ syʁ sjul], literally Saint-Pourçain on Sioule; Auvergnat: Sant Porçanh de Siula) is a commune in the Allier department in Auvergne-Rhône-Alpes in central France. It is named after Saint Pourçain, a 6th century AD freed slave who was founder of a local monastery.

== Geography ==
The commune is located 28 km (17 mi) north of Vichy and 32 km (20 mi) south of Moulins on the former Route nationale 9 (departmental road 2009).

The river Bouble forms part of the commune's southern border, then flows into the Sioule, which flows north-northeast through the commune and crosses the town.

== Population ==
Historical population

Year	Pop.	±% p.a.
1793	3,458	—
1800	3,395	−0.26%
1806	3,559	+0.79%
1821	3,975	+0.74%
1831	4,376	+0.97%
1836	4,731	+1.57%
1841	4,636	−0.40%
1846	4,961	+1.36%
1851	4,938	−0.09%
1856	4,873	−0.26%
1861	5,006	+0.54%
1866	5,001	−0.02%
1872	4,997	−0.01%
1876	4,998	+0.01%
1881	5,025	+0.11%
1886	5,106	+0.32%
1891	4,998	−0.43%
1896	5,001	+0.01%
1901	4,943	−0.23%

Year	Pop.	±% p.a.
1906	5,101	+0.63%
1911	4,921	−0.72%
1921	4,579	−0.72%
1926	4,810	+0.99%
1931	4,598	−0.90%
1936	4,560	−0.17%
1946	4,430	−0.29%
1954	4,414	−0.05%
1962	4,799	+1.05%
1968	5,088	+0.98%
1975	5,345	+0.71%
1982	5,199	−0.39%
1990	5,159	−0.10%
1999	5,263	+0.22%
2007	5,045	−0.53%
2012	4,956	−0.36%
2017	5,160	+0.81%
2023	4,884	−0.91%

Source: EHESS and INSEE

== Wine ==
Saint-Pourçain wine is made in an area around the commune.

== Natural and technological risks ==
The city is exposed to some natural risks :

- Flood risk due to the fact that the Sioule goes through the city. The last significant flood has been recorded in year 1982.
- Earthquake hazard : low risk zone.

as well as two industrial risks :

- Transport of hazardous substances: County roads 2009 and 46 (East) record significant traffic, including trucks. Besides, two gas pipelines go across the city.
- Dam failure : It concerns the dam "des Fades", which can cause a flood, the wave being felt 4 hours after the failure.

The entire county is exposed to storm risk. 150 km/h winds have been recorded just before the year 2000.

Two prevention plans of natural risks have been prescribed on the basins of the "Sioule" and of the "Allier", and have both been approved respectively in year 1999 and 2008.

== Personalities ==
- Durandus of Saint-Pourçain (ca.1275 – 1332), an important scholastic theologian and philosopher, member of the Dominican order, was born here.
- French diplomat and cryptographer Blaise de Vigenère was born in the town in 1523.

== See also ==
- Communes of the Allier department
