= Chareil-Cintrat =

- Commune
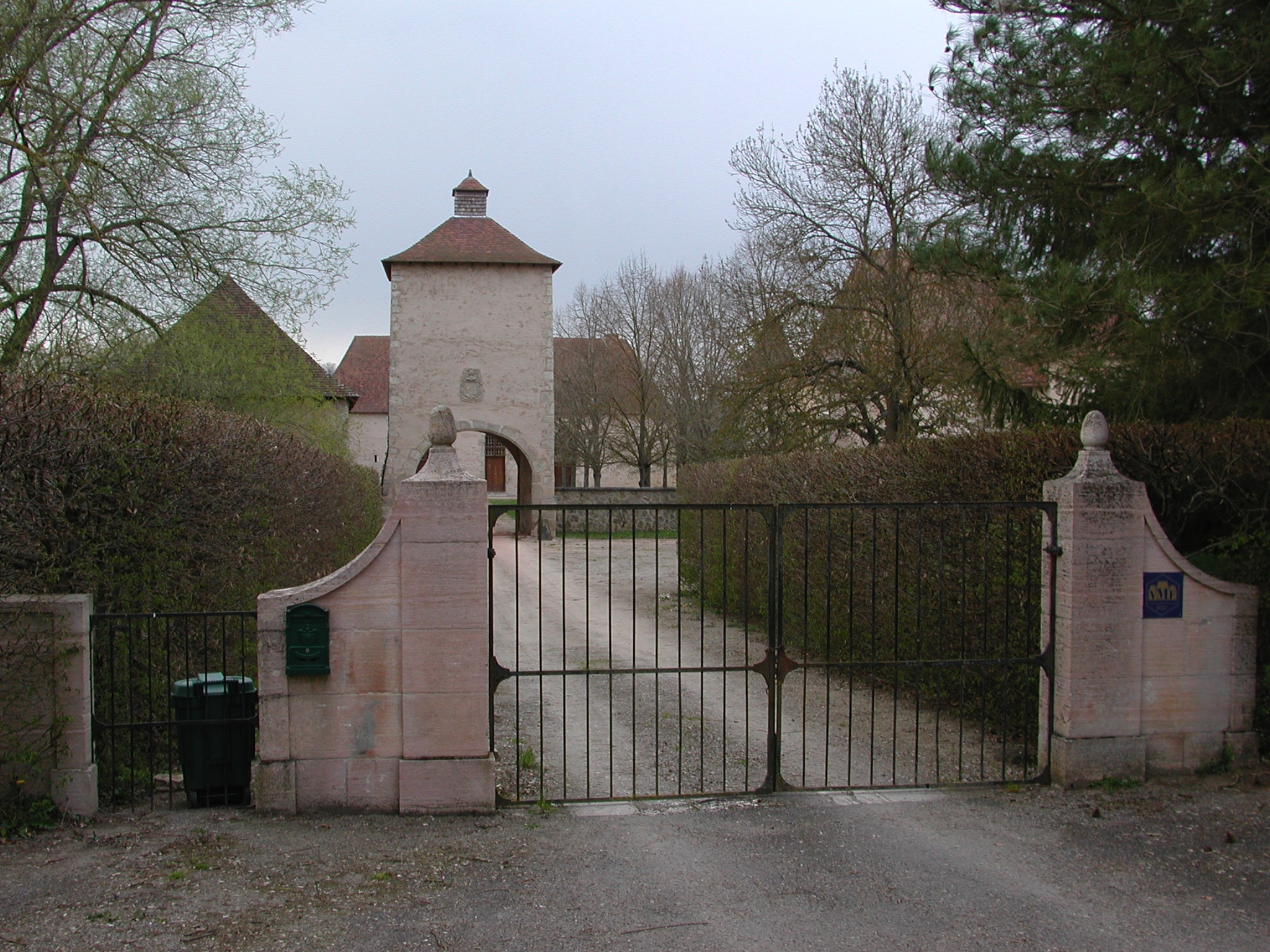
- Entrance to La Rivière
- Location of Chareil-Cintrat
- Location within France Location within Auvergne-Rhône-Alpes
- Coordinates: 46°16′03″N 3°13′16″E
- Country: France
- Region: Auvergne-Rhône-Alpes
- Department: Allier
- Arrondissement: Vichy
- Canton: Gannat
- Intercommunality: Saint-Pourçain Sioule Limagne

Government
  - Mayor (2026–32): Christophe David Fayollet
- Area^{1}: 12.77 km^{2} (4.93 sq mi)
- Elevation: 231 m (758 ft)
- Highest elevation: 342 m (1,122 ft)
- Lowest elevation: 241 m (791 ft)
- Population (2023): 388
  - Density: 30.4/km^{2} (78.7/sq mi)
- Time zone: UTC+01:00 (CET)
  - Summer (DST): UTC+02:00 (CEST)
- INSEE/Postal code: 03059 /03140
- ^{1} French Land Register data, which excludes lakes, ponds, glaciers > 1 km^{2} (0.386 sq mi or 247 acres) and river estuaries.

Chareil-Cintrat (French pronunciation: [ʃaʁɛj sɛ̃tʁa]; Occitan: Charuelh e Sintrac) is a commune in the Allier department in central France.

== Geography ==
The river Bouble flows northeast through the commune.

== Population ==
Historical population
Year	Pop.	±% p.a.
1968	479	—
1975	378	−3.33%
1982	316	−2.53%
1990	311	−0.20%
1999	317	+0.21%
2007	331	+0.54%
2012	359	+1.64%
2017	358	−0.06%
2023	388	+1.35%
Source: INSEE

== See also ==
- Communes of the Allier department
