= Chantelle, Allier =

Chantelle
- Commune
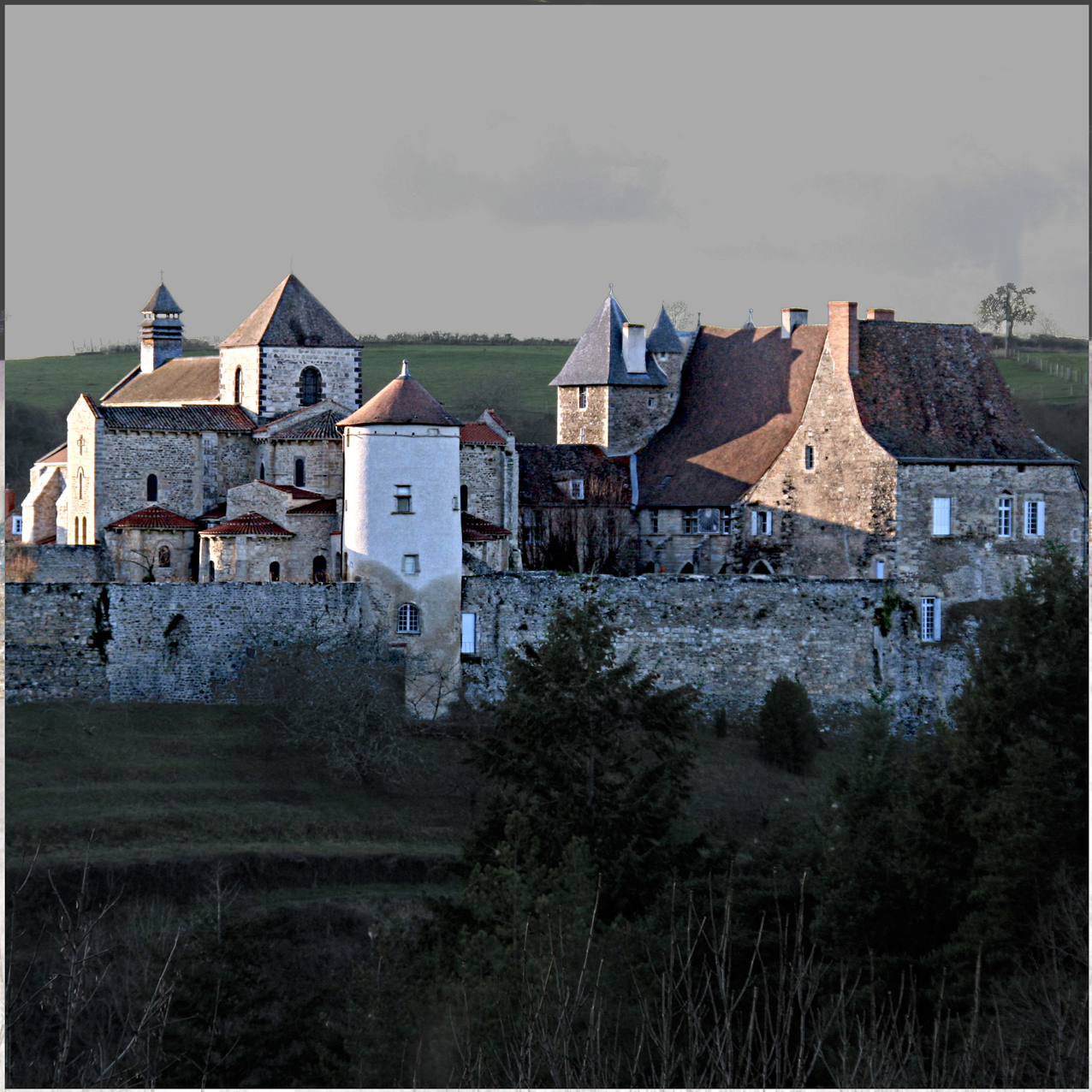
- The abbey in Chantelle

- Coat of arms
- Location of Chantelle
- Location within France Location within Auvergne-Rhône-Alpes
- Coordinates: 46°14′20″N 3°09′14″E
- Country: France
- Region: Auvergne-Rhône-Alpes
- Department: Allier
- Arrondissement: Vichy
- Canton: Gannat
- Intercommunality: Saint-Pourçain Sioule Limagne

Government
  - Mayor (2026–32): André Bidaud
- Area^{1}: 10.96 km^{2} (4.23 sq mi)
- Elevation: 324 m (1,063 ft)
- Highest elevation: 349 m (1,145 ft)
- Lowest elevation: 258 m (846 ft)
- Population (2023): 1,131
  - Density: 103.2/km^{2} (267.3/sq mi)
- Time zone: UTC+01:00 (CET)
  - Summer (DST): UTC+02:00 (CEST)
- INSEE/Postal code: 03053 /03140
- ^{1} French Land Register data, which excludes lakes, ponds, glaciers > 1 km^{2} (0.386 sq mi or 247 acres) and river estuaries.

Chantelle (French pronunciation: [ʃɑ̃tɛl]; Occitan: Chantela) is a commune in the Allier department in central France.

== Geography ==
The village lies on the right bank of the Bouble, which forms most of the commune's northern border.

== Population ==
Historical population
Year	Pop.	±% p.a.
1968	1,121	—
1975	1,069	−0.68%
1982	1,084	+0.20%
1990	1,043	−0.48%
1999	1,040	−0.03%
2007	1,059	+0.23%
2012	1,069	+0.19%
2017	1,077	+0.15%
2023	1,131	+0.82%
Source: INSEE

== See also ==
- Communes of the Allier department
