= Sioule =

River in central France

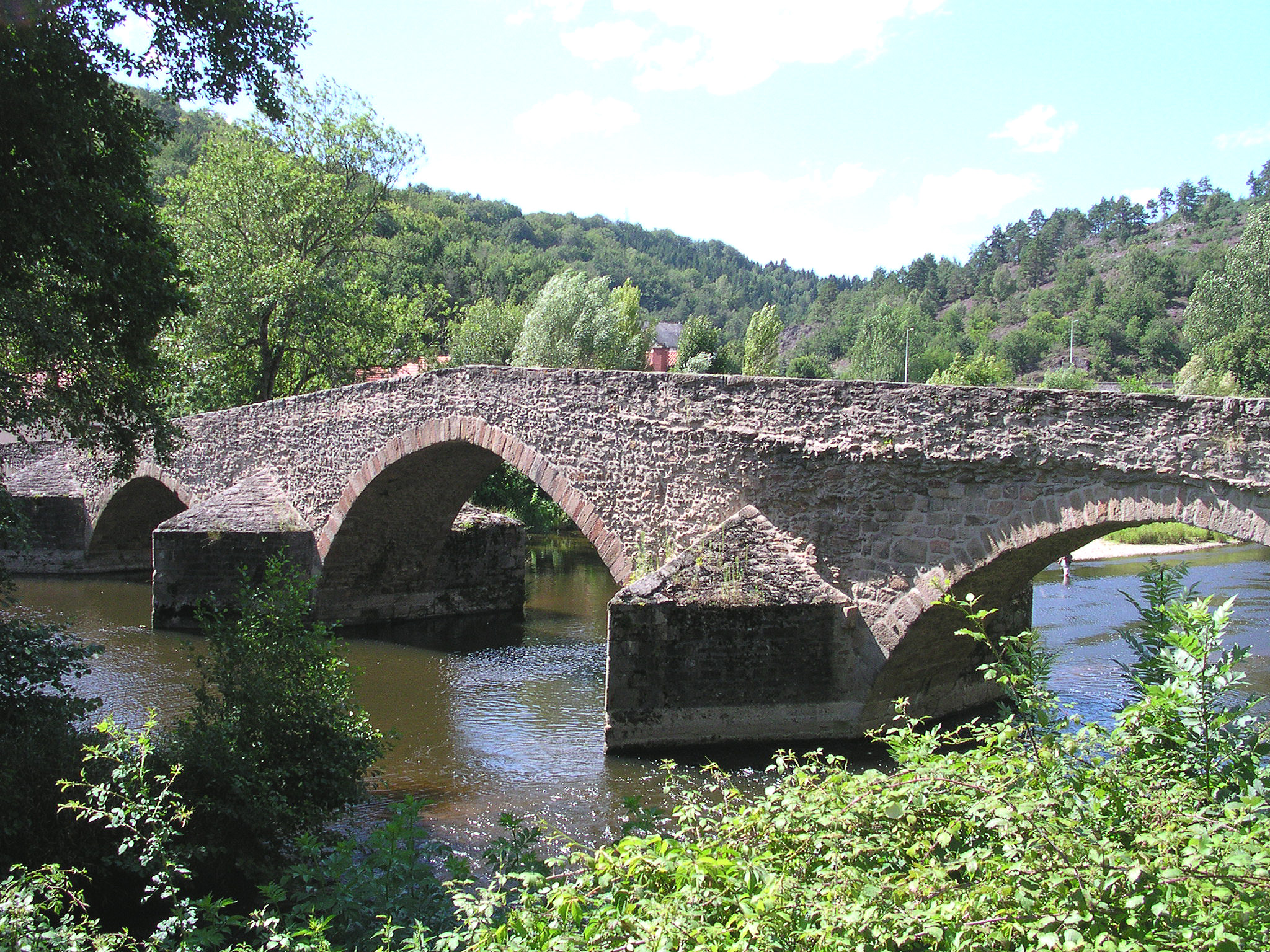
- The bridge over the Sioule in Menat

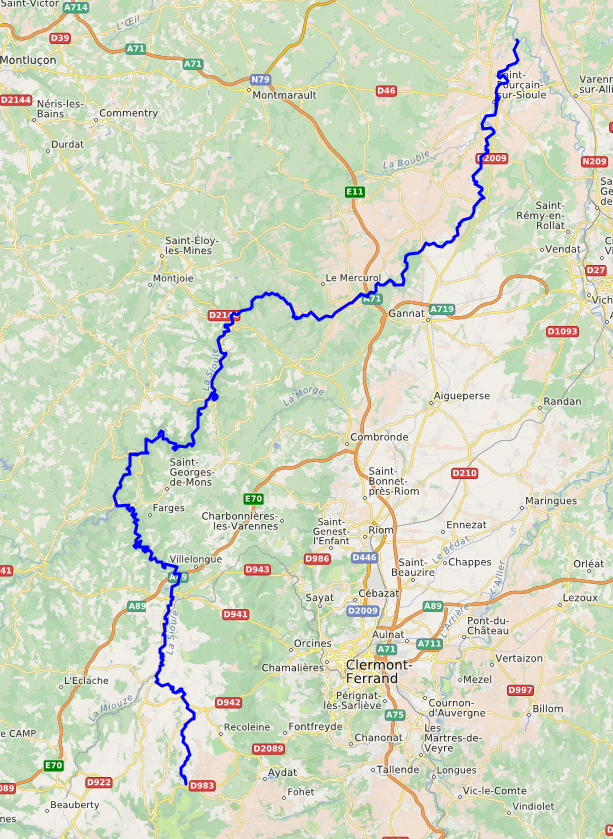

Location
- Country: France

Physical characteristics
- Source
  - location: Massif Central
  - elevation: 1,090 m (3,580 ft)
- Mouth
  - location: Allier
  - coordinates: 46°21′57″N 3°19′11″E
  - elevation: 222 m (728 ft)
- Length: 164 km (102 mi)
- Basin size: 2,468 km^{2} (953 sq mi)
- Discharge
  - average: 26 m^{3}/s (920 cu ft/s)

Basin features
- Progression: Allier→ Loire→ Atlantic Ocean

The Sioule (French pronunciation: [sjul]; Occitan: Siula) is a 164-kilometre (102 mi) long river in central France, a left tributary of the river Allier. Its source is near the village of Orcival, north of Mont-Dore, in the Massif Central. The Sioule has cut a deep gorge, especially in its upper course. The Sioule flows generally northeast through the following departments and towns:

- Puy-de-Dôme: Pontgibaud
- Allier: Ébreuil, Saint-Pourçain-sur-Sioule

The Sioule flows into the river Allier at La Ferté-Hauterive, 10 km (6 mi) north of Saint-Pourçain-sur-Sioule.

Its main tributaries are the Sioulet and the Bouble.

The Fades viaduct, the tallest railway bridge in France, is located on the Sioule.
