= Canton of Ébreuil =

Coordinates: 46°06′59″N 3°05′15″E

Ébreuil
- Former canton
- Interactive map of Ébreuil
- Country: France
- Region: Auvergne-Rhône-Alpes
- Department: Allier
- No. of communes: {{{nbcomm}}}
- Disbanded: 2015
- Area: 211.13 km^{2} (81.52 sq mi)
- Population (2012): 4,601
  - Density: 21.79/km^{2} (56.44/sq mi)

The canton of Ébreuil is a former administrative division in central France. It was disbanded following the French canton reorganisation which came into effect in March 2015. It consisted of 14 communes, which joined the canton of Gannat in 2015. It had 4,601 inhabitants (2012).

The canton comprised the following communes:

- Bellenaves
- Chirat-l'Église
- Chouvigny
- Coutansouze
- Ébreuil
- Échassières
- Lalizolle
- Louroux-de-Bouble
- Nades
- Naves
- Sussat
- Valignat
- Veauce
- Vicq

== Demographics ==
Historical population Canton of Ébreuil
Year	1962	1968	1975	1982	1990	1999
Pop.	5,096	5,922	5,146	4,714	4,267	4,421
±%	—	+16.2%	−13.1%	−8.4%	−9.5%	+3.6%
From the year 1962 on: No double counting – residents of multiple communes (e.g. students and military personnel) are counted only once. Source: INSEE

== See also ==
- Cantons of the Allier department
