= Canton of Chantelle =

Coordinates: 46°14′20″N 3°09′14″E

Chantelle
- Former canton
- Interactive map of Chantelle
- Country: France
- Region: Auvergne-Rhône-Alpes
- Department: Allier
- No. of communes: {{{nbcomm}}}
- Disbanded: 2015
- Area: 229.68 km^{2} (88.68 sq mi)
- Population (2012): 5,310
  - Density: 23.1/km^{2} (59.9/sq mi)

The canton of Chantelle is a former administrative division in central France. It was disbanded following the French canton reorganisation which came into effect in March 2015. It consisted of 15 communes, which joined the canton of Gannat in 2015. It had 5,310 inhabitants (2012).

The canton comprised the following communes:

- Barberier
- Chantelle
- Chareil-Cintrat
- Charroux
- Chezelle
- Deneuille-lès-Chantelle
- Étroussat
- Fleuriel
- Fourilles
- Monestier
- Saint-Germain-de-Salles
- Target
- Taxat-Senat
- Ussel-d'Allier
- Voussac

== Demographics ==
Historical population Canton of Chantelle
| Year | 1962 | 1968 | 1975 | 1982 | 1990 | 1999 |
| Pop. | 5,857 | 6,374 | 5,560 | 5,087 | 4,910 | 4,870 |
| ±% | — | +8.8% | −12.8% | −8.5% | −3.5% | −0.8% |
From the year 1962 on: No double counting – residents of multiple communes (e.g. students and military personnel) are counted only once. Source: INSEE

== See also ==
- Cantons of the Allier department
