= Saint-Bonnet-de-Rochefort =

- Commune
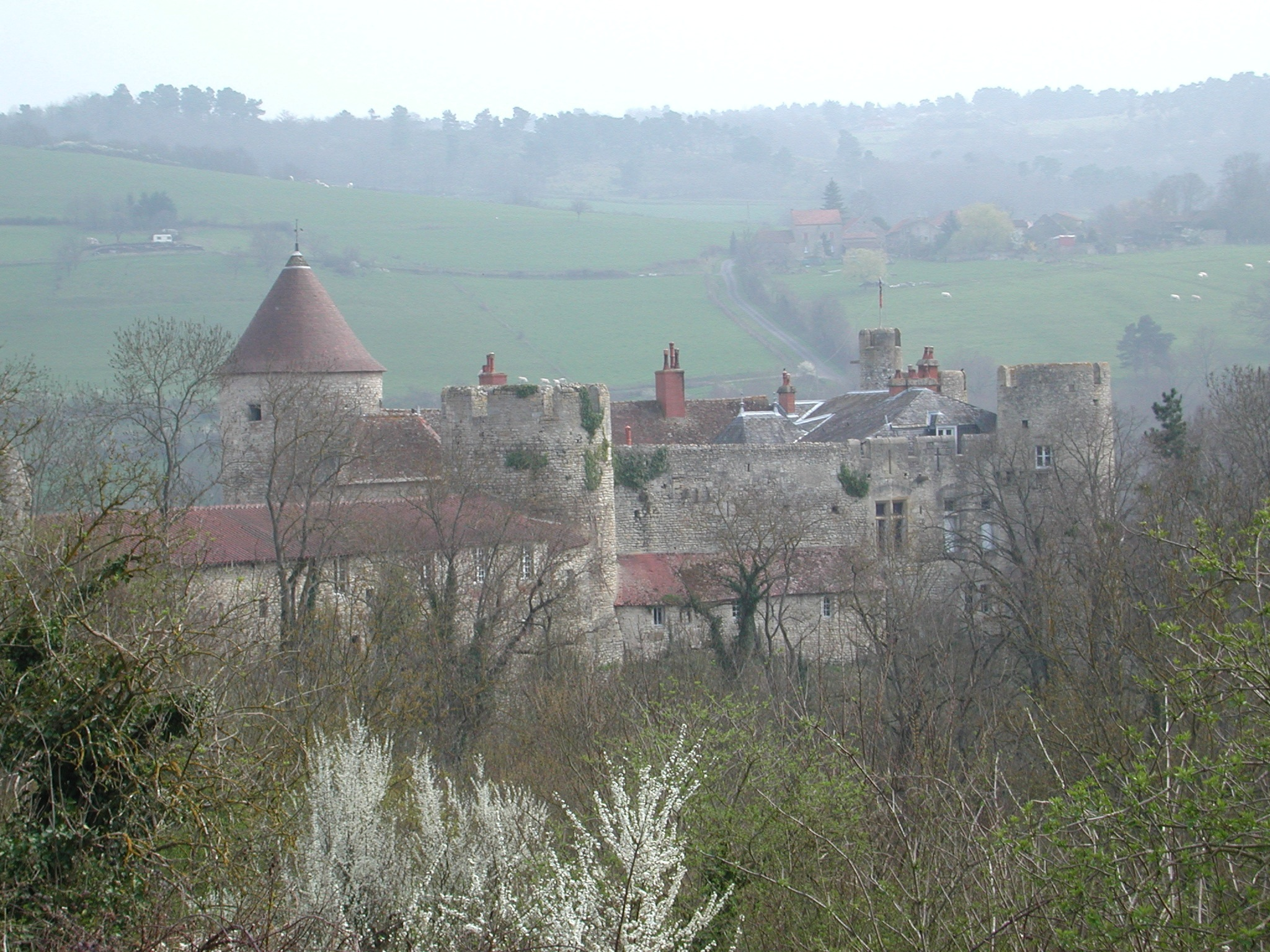
- Chateau of Rochefort

- Coat of arms
- Location of Saint-Bonnet-de-Rochefort
- Location within France Location within Auvergne-Rhône-Alpes
- Coordinates: 46°08′50″N 3°08′21″E
- Country: France
- Region: Auvergne-Rhône-Alpes
- Department: Allier
- Arrondissement: Vichy
- Canton: Gannat
- Intercommunality: Saint-Pourçain Sioule Limagne

Government
  - Mayor (2026–32): Michel Verrier
- Area^{1}: 16.36 km^{2} (6.32 sq mi)
- Elevation: 334 m (1,096 ft)
- Highest elevation: 412 m (1,352 ft)
- Lowest elevation: 290 m (950 ft)
- Population (2023): 713
  - Density: 43.6/km^{2} (113/sq mi)
- Time zone: UTC+01:00 (CET)
  - Summer (DST): UTC+02:00 (CEST)
- INSEE/Postal code: 03220 /03800
- ^{1} French Land Register data, which excludes lakes, ponds, glaciers > 1 km^{2} (0.386 sq mi or 247 acres) and river estuaries.

Saint-Bonnet-de-Rochefort (French pronunciation: [sɛ̃ bɔnɛ də ʁɔʃfɔʁ]; Auvergnat: Sant Bonet de Ròchafòrt) is a commune in the Allier department in Auvergne-Rhône-Alpes in central France.

== Geography ==
Saint-Bonnet-de-Rochefort is located in the south of the Allier department, 9 kilometres (5.6 mi) of Gannat, 3 kilometres (1.9 mi) of Vicq by departmental road 37; 5 kilometres (3.1 mi) of Ébreuil and Charroux by D35.

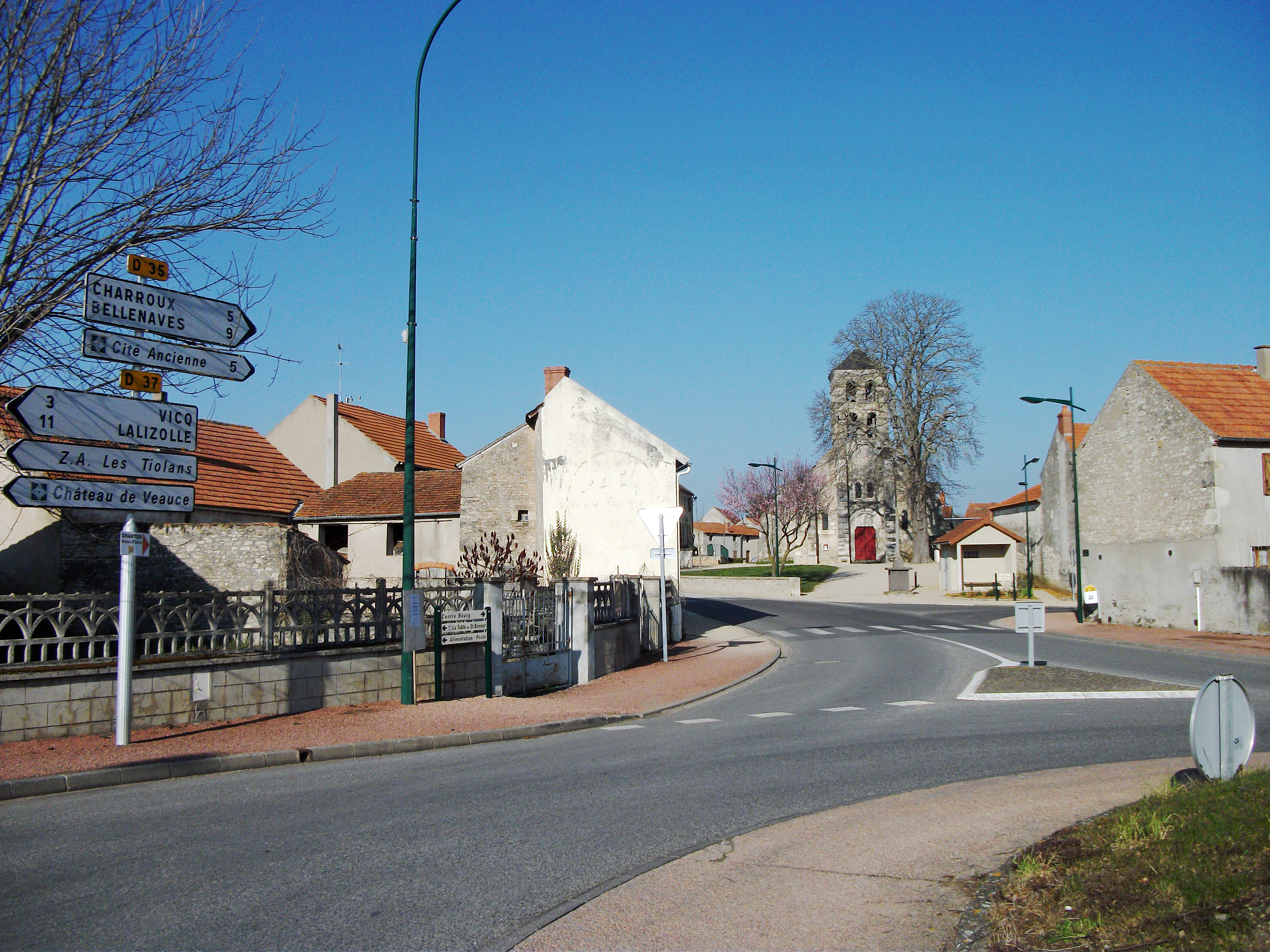
Departmental road 35 passing town centre.

== Population ==
Historical population
Year	Pop.	±% p.a.
1968	701	—
1975	669	−0.67%
1982	715	+0.95%
1990	712	−0.05%
1999	656	−0.91%
2007	650	−0.11%
2012	647	−0.09%
2017	698	+1.53%
2023	713	+0.36%
Source: INSEE

== See also ==
- Communes of the Allier department
