= Taxat-Senat =

- Commune
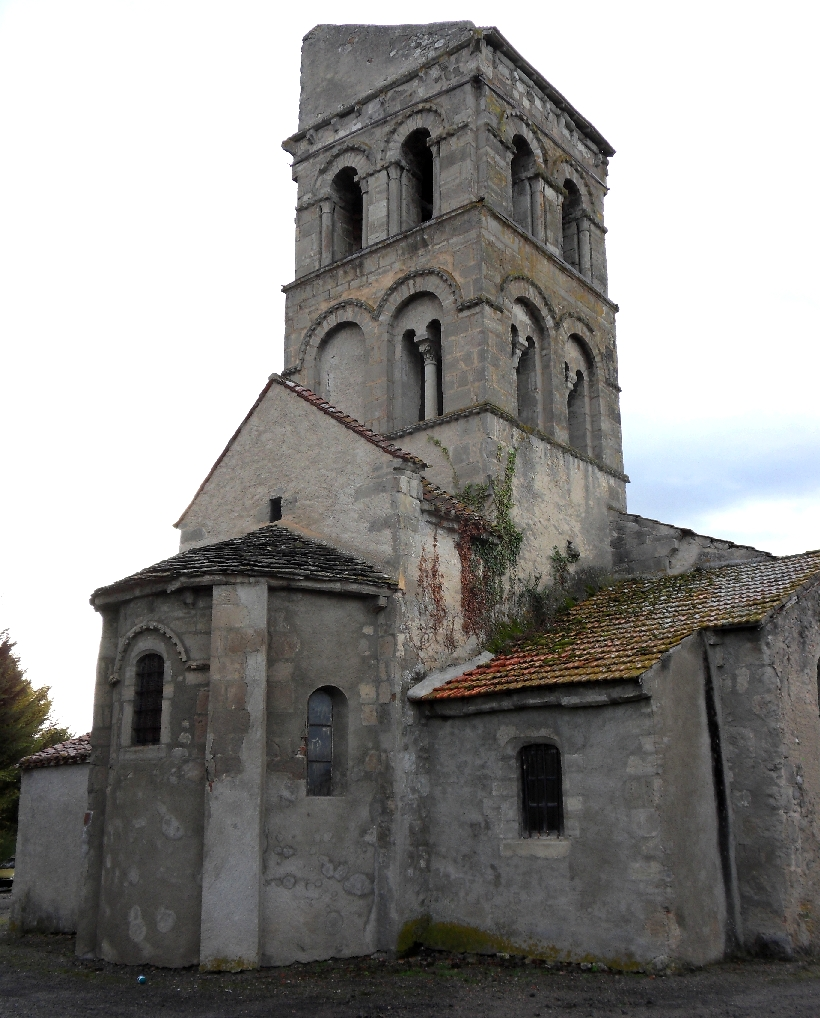
- The church in Senat
- Location of Taxat-Senat
- Location within France Location within Auvergne-Rhône-Alpes
- Coordinates: 46°12′06″N 3°08′20″E
- Country: France
- Region: Auvergne-Rhône-Alpes
- Department: Allier
- Arrondissement: Vichy
- Canton: Gannat
- Intercommunality: Saint-Pourçain Sioule Limagne

Government
  - Mayor (2026–32): Jean-Philippe Guittard
- Area^{1}: 13.62 km^{2} (5.26 sq mi)
- Elevation: 273 m (896 ft)
- Highest elevation: 406 m (1,332 ft)
- Lowest elevation: 267 m (876 ft)
- Population (2023): 222
  - Density: 16.3/km^{2} (42.2/sq mi)
- Time zone: UTC+01:00 (CET)
  - Summer (DST): UTC+02:00 (CEST)
- INSEE/Postal code: 03278 /03140
- ^{1} French Land Register data, which excludes lakes, ponds, glaciers > 1 km^{2} (0.386 sq mi or 247 acres) and river estuaries.

Taxat-Senat is a commune in the Allier department in Auvergne-Rhône-Alpes in central France. It is located 16.5 kilometres (10.3 mi) northwest of Gannat along the D223 road, northwest of Charroux, southwest of Chezelle, west of Ussel-d'Allier and northeast of Bellenaves and Naves.

== Population ==
Historical population
Year	Pop.	±% p.a.
1968	321	—
1975	274	−2.24%
1982	239	−1.93%
1990	213	−1.43%
1999	210	−0.16%
2007	227	+0.98%
2012	218	−0.81%
2017	196	−2.11%
2023	222	+2.10%
Source: INSEE

== Economy ==
As of 2020, the working age population was 117 people, of which 74% were active (7% unemployed) and 26% were inactive (11% retired, 10% students).

== Sights ==
The commune contains the Église romane Saint-André de Taxat, dated to the twelfth century with rich frescoes of the fourteenth century. It is listed on the Supplementary List of Historic Monuments and is partly ruined, especially the floor of the nave and is subject to a restoration plan. The other church, Église de Senat, the parish church, has an apse and bell tower which are also on Supplementary List of Historic Monuments.

== Personalities ==
- Hubert Pradon-Vallancy (1891–1943), Deputy of the Allier Department from 1928 to 1932. He was born in the Château de Mont in Taxat-Senat and was also mayor of Taxat-Senat.

== See also ==
- Communes of the Allier department
