= Charmes, Allier =

Charmes
- Commune
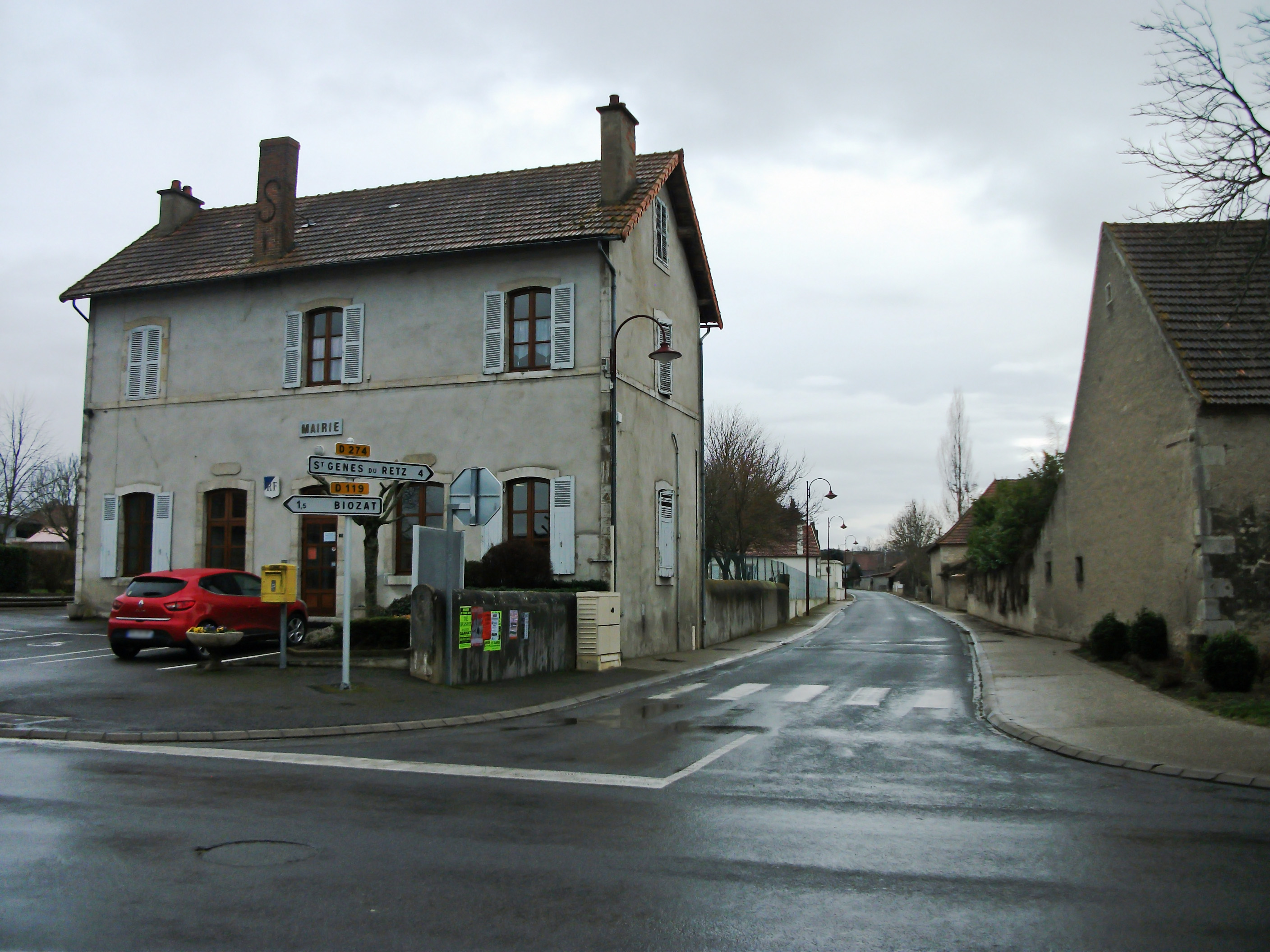
- Town hall
- Location of Charmes
- Location within France Location within Auvergne-Rhône-Alpes
- Coordinates: 46°04′34″N 3°15′09″E
- Country: France
- Region: Auvergne-Rhône-Alpes
- Department: Allier
- Arrondissement: Vichy
- Canton: Gannat
- Intercommunality: Saint-Pourçain Sioule Limagne

Government
  - Mayor (2026–32): Jean Durantel
- Area^{1}: 8.19 km^{2} (3.16 sq mi)
- Elevation: 340 m (1,120 ft)
- Highest elevation: 428 m (1,404 ft)
- Lowest elevation: 318 m (1,043 ft)
- Population (2023): 369
  - Density: 45.1/km^{2} (117/sq mi)
- Time zone: UTC+01:00 (CET)
  - Summer (DST): UTC+02:00 (CEST)
- INSEE/Postal code: 03061 /03800
- ^{1} French Land Register data, which excludes lakes, ponds, glaciers > 1 km^{2} (0.386 sq mi or 247 acres) and river estuaries.

Charmes (French pronunciation: [ʃaʁm]; Occitan: Charmas) is a commune in the Allier department in central France.

== Population ==
Historical population
| Year | Pop. | ±% p.a. |
|---|---|---|
| 1968 | 315 | — |
| 1975 | 286 | −1.37% |
| 1982 | 308 | +1.06% |
| 1990 | 328 | +0.79% |
| 1999 | 293 | −1.25% |
| 2007 | 337 | +1.76% |
| 2012 | 392 | +3.07% |
| 2017 | 398 | +0.30% |
| 2023 | 369 | −1.25% |
Source: INSEE

== See also ==
- Communes of the Allier department
