= Biozat =

- Commune
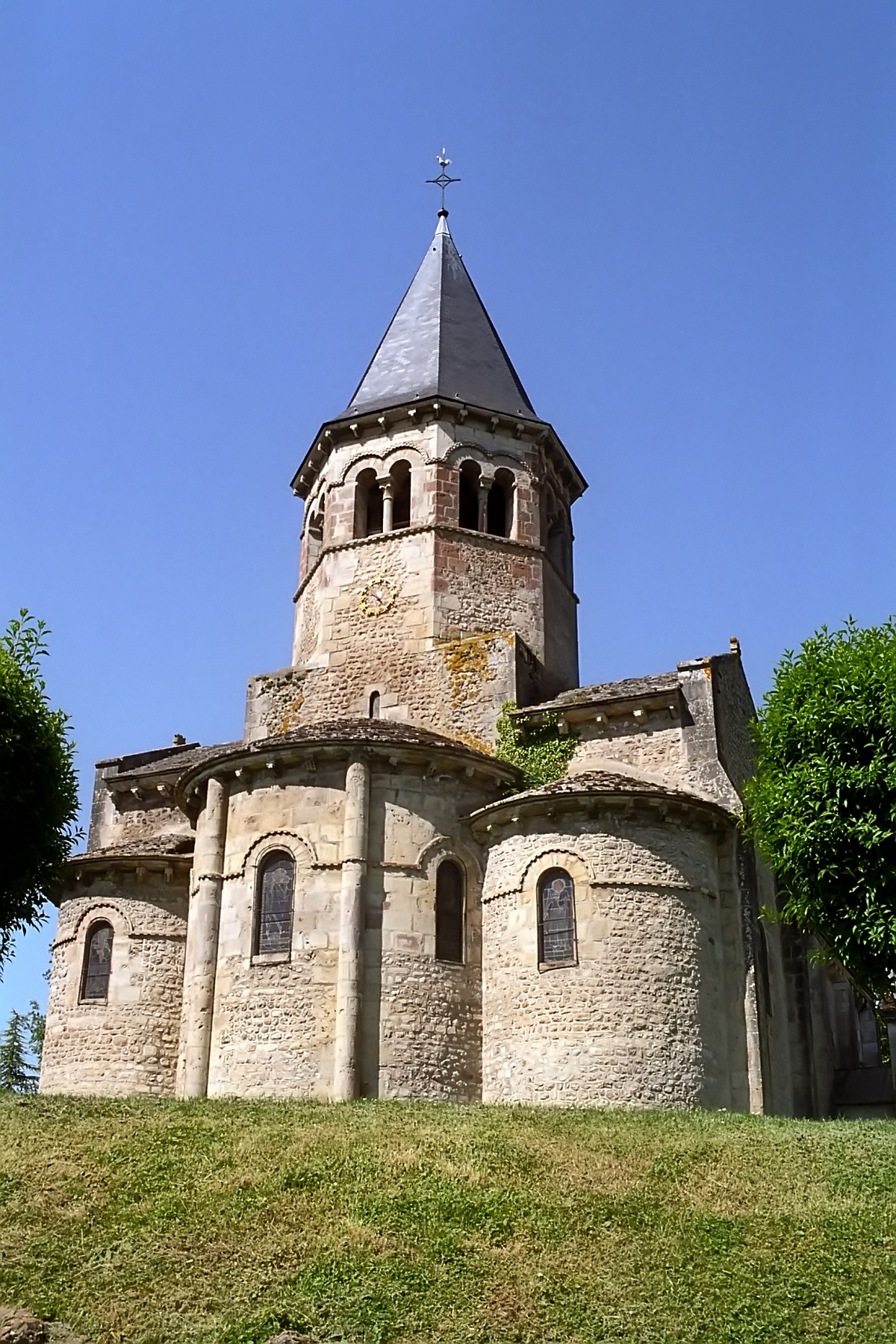
- The church in Biozat

- Coat of arms
- Location of Biozat
- Location within France Location within Auvergne-Rhône-Alpes
- Coordinates: 46°04′39″N 3°16′24″E
- Country: France
- Region: Auvergne-Rhône-Alpes
- Department: Allier
- Arrondissement: Vichy
- Canton: Gannat

Government
  - Mayor (2026–32): Florence Brionnet
- Area^{1}: 16.46 km^{2} (6.36 sq mi)
- Elevation: 366 m (1,201 ft)
- Highest elevation: 404 m (1,325 ft)
- Lowest elevation: 326 m (1,070 ft)
- Population (2023): 933
  - Density: 56.7/km^{2} (147/sq mi)
- Time zone: UTC+01:00 (CET)
  - Summer (DST): UTC+02:00 (CEST)
- INSEE/Postal code: 03030 /03800
- ^{1} French Land Register data, which excludes lakes, ponds, glaciers > 1 km^{2} (0.386 sq mi or 247 acres) and river estuaries.

Biozat (French pronunciation: [bjoza]) is a commune in the Allier department in central France.

== Population ==
Historical population
Year	Pop.	±% p.a.
1968	680	—
1975	663	−0.36%
1982	684	+0.45%
1990	716	+0.57%
1999	663	−0.85%
2007	707	+0.81%
2012	758	+1.40%
2017	845	+2.20%
2023	933	+1.66%
Source: INSEE

== See also ==
- Communes of the Allier department
