= Bègues =

- Commune
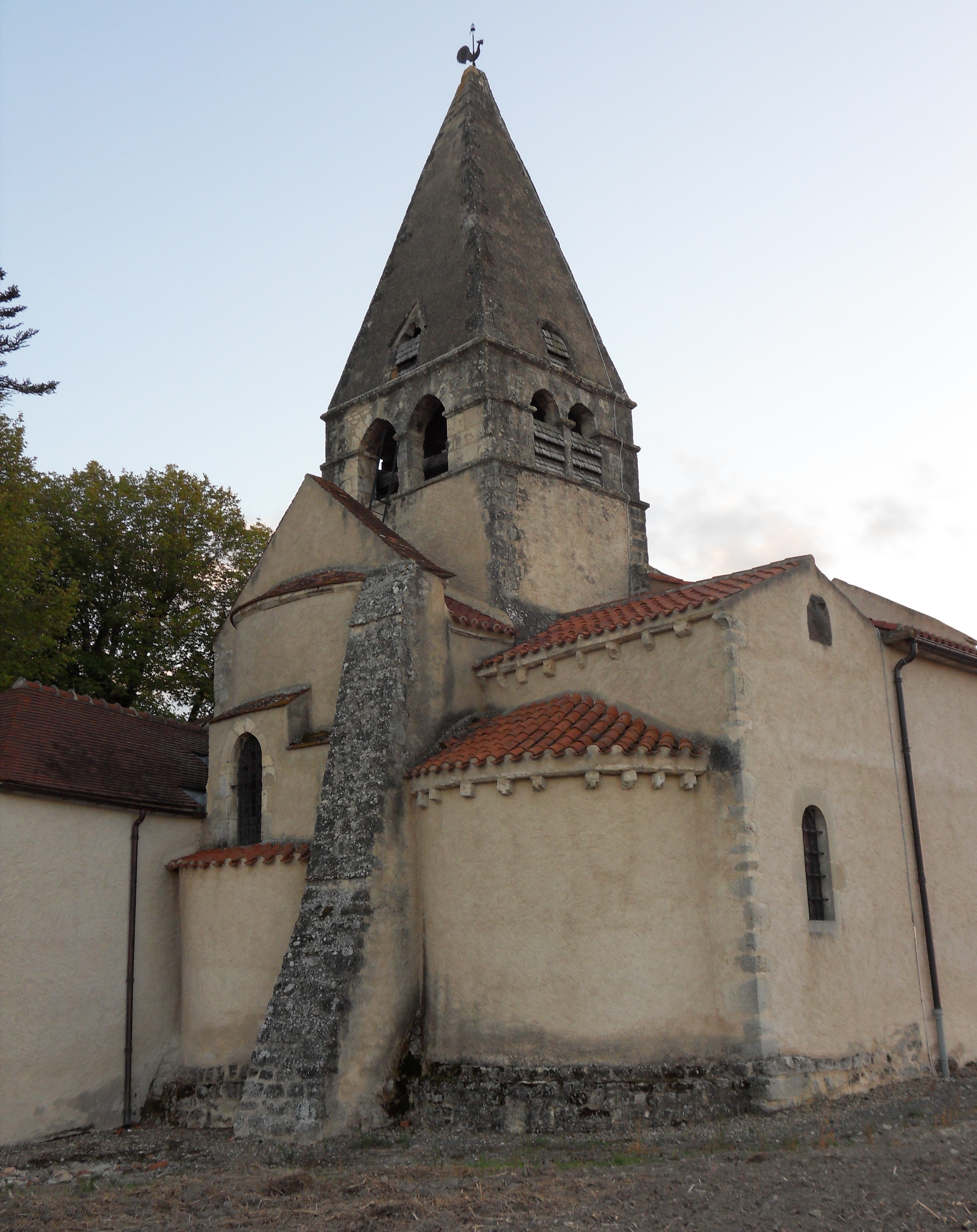
- The church in Bègues

- Coat of arms
- Location of Bègues
- Location within France Location within Auvergne-Rhône-Alpes
- Coordinates: 46°07′42″N 3°09′24″E
- Country: France
- Region: Auvergne-Rhône-Alpes
- Department: Allier
- Arrondissement: Vichy
- Canton: Gannat
- Intercommunality: Saint-Pourçain Sioule Limagne

Government
  - Mayor (2026–32): Serge Maume
- Area^{1}: 8.3 km^{2} (3.2 sq mi)
- Elevation: 525 m (1,722 ft)
- Highest elevation: 520 m (1,710 ft)
- Lowest elevation: 290 m (950 ft)
- Population (2023): 232
  - Density: 28/km^{2} (72/sq mi)
- Time zone: UTC+01:00 (CET)
  - Summer (DST): UTC+02:00 (CEST)
- INSEE/Postal code: 03021 /03800
- ^{1} French Land Register data, which excludes lakes, ponds, glaciers > 1 km^{2} (0.386 sq mi or 247 acres) and river estuaries.

Bègues (French pronunciation: [bɛɡ]; Occitan: Begas) is a commune in the Allier department in central France.

== Geography ==
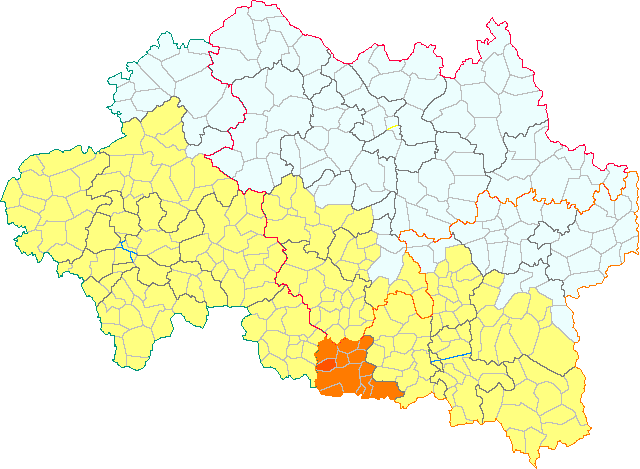
Location of Bègues in the canton of Gannat (before March 2015).

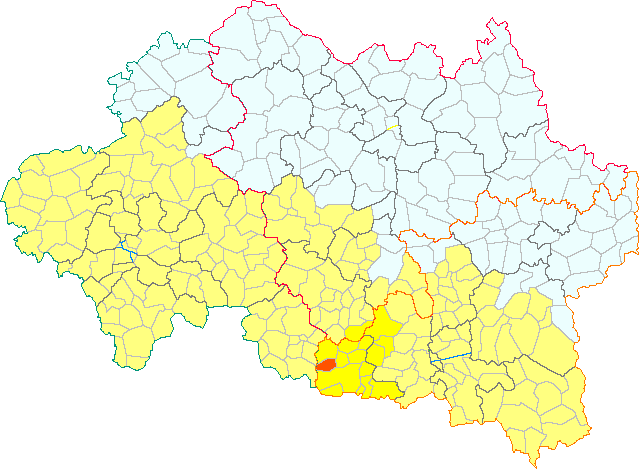
Location of Bègues in the former Bassin de Gannat intercommunality.

== Population ==
Historical population
Year	Pop.	±% p.a.
1968	150	—
1975	152	+0.19%
1982	196	+3.70%
1990	193	−0.19%
1999	202	+0.51%
2007	228	+1.52%
2012	231	+0.26%
2017	227	−0.35%
2023	232	+0.36%
Source: INSEE

== Administration ==
- 2008–2014: Georges Beaumet
- 2014–2020: Alain Viguié
- 2020–current: Serge Maume

== See also ==
- Communes of the Allier department
