= Monteignet-sur-l'Andelot =

- Commune
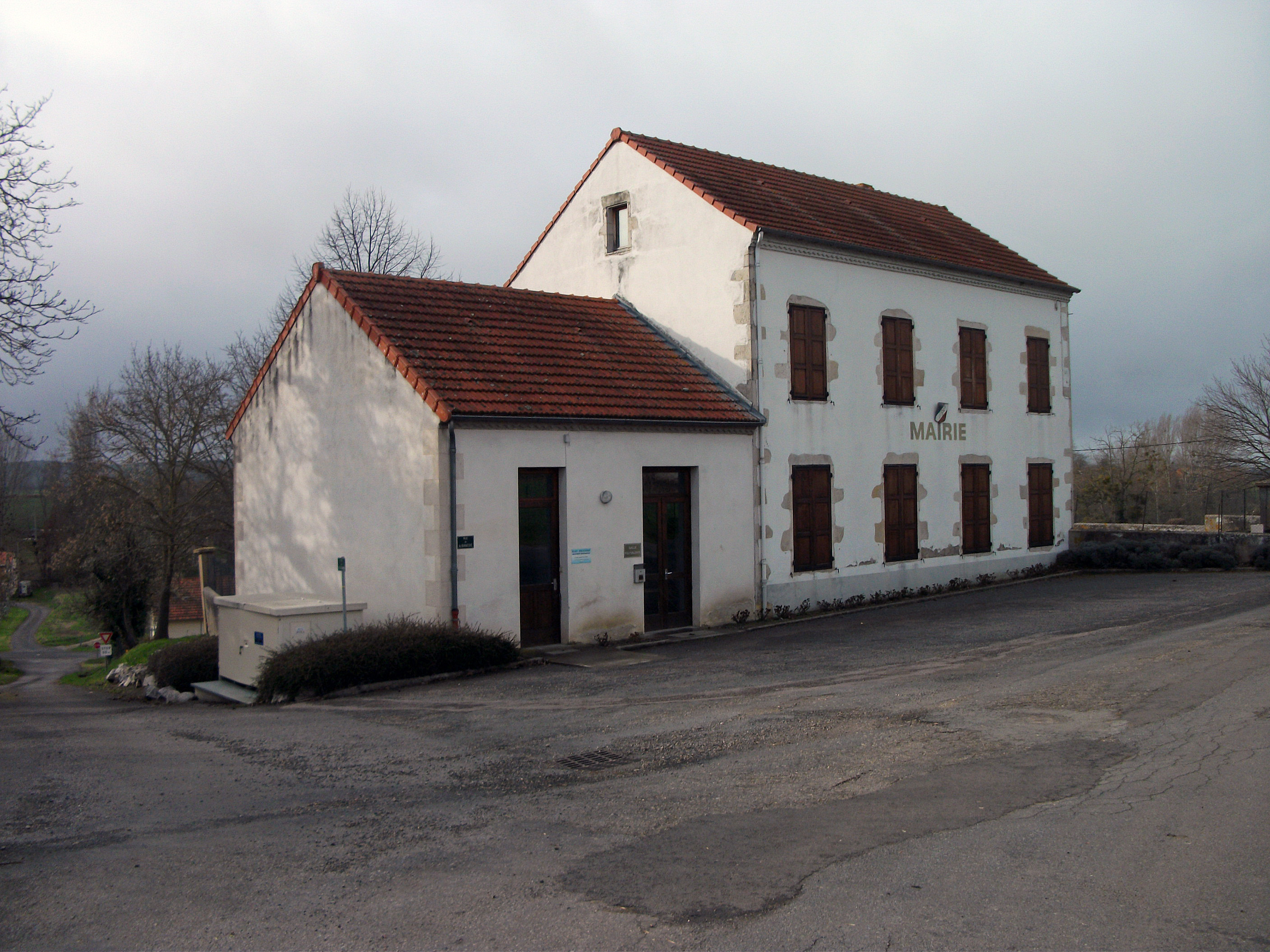
- Town hall
- Location of Monteignet-sur-l'Andelot
- Location within France Location within Auvergne-Rhône-Alpes
- Coordinates: 46°07′23″N 3°15′27″E
- Country: France
- Region: Auvergne-Rhône-Alpes
- Department: Allier
- Arrondissement: Vichy
- Canton: Gannat

Government
  - Mayor (2026–32): Fabien Cartoux
- Area^{1}: 9.38 km^{2} (3.62 sq mi)
- Elevation: 345 m (1,132 ft)
- Highest elevation: 345 m (1,132 ft)
- Lowest elevation: 305 m (1,001 ft)
- Population (2023): 266
  - Density: 28.4/km^{2} (73.4/sq mi)
- Time zone: UTC+01:00 (CET)
  - Summer (DST): UTC+02:00 (CEST)
- INSEE/Postal code: 03182 /03800
- ^{1} French Land Register data, which excludes lakes, ponds, glaciers > 1 km^{2} (0.386 sq mi or 247 acres) and river estuaries.

Monteignet-sur-l'Andelot (French pronunciation: [mɔ̃tɛɲɛ syʁ lɑ̃dlo]) is a commune in the Allier department in central France.

== Population ==
Historical population
Year	Pop.	±% p.a.
1968	283	—
1975	249	−1.81%
1982	297	+2.55%
1990	287	−0.43%
1999	271	−0.64%
2007	230	−2.03%
2012	245	+1.27%
2017	266	+1.66%
2023	266	+0.00%
Source: INSEE

== See also ==
- Communes of the Allier department
