= Poëzat =

- Commune
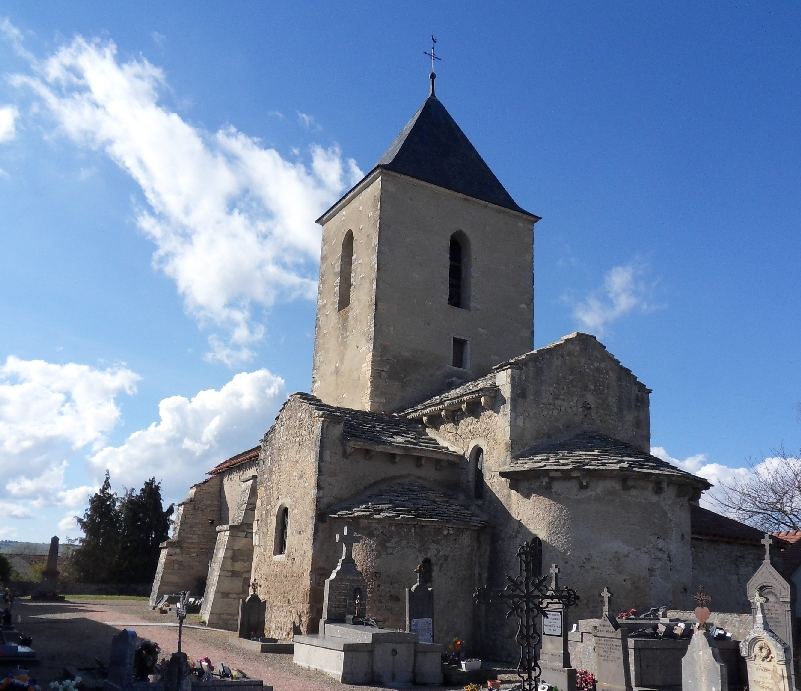
- The church in Poëzat
- Location of Poëzat
- Location within France Location within Auvergne-Rhône-Alpes
- Coordinates: 46°04′41″N 3°13′30″E
- Country: France
- Region: Auvergne-Rhône-Alpes
- Department: Allier
- Arrondissement: Vichy
- Canton: Gannat

Government
  - Mayor (2026–32): Philippe Williams
- Area^{1}: 2.12 km^{2} (0.82 sq mi)
- Elevation: 350 m (1,150 ft)
- Highest elevation: 349 m (1,145 ft)
- Lowest elevation: 330 m (1,080 ft)
- Population (2023): 152
  - Density: 71.7/km^{2} (186/sq mi)
- Time zone: UTC+01:00 (CET)
  - Summer (DST): UTC+02:00 (CEST)
- INSEE/Postal code: 03209 /03800
- ^{1} French Land Register data, which excludes lakes, ponds, glaciers > 1 km^{2} (0.386 sq mi or 247 acres) and river estuaries.

Poëzat (French pronunciation: [pɔɛza]; Occitan: Paisat) is a commune in the Allier department in Auvergne in central France.

== Population ==
Historical population
Year	Pop.	±% p.a.
1968	97	—
1975	103	+0.86%
1982	108	+0.68%
1990	127	+2.05%
1999	129	+0.17%
2007	115	−1.43%
2012	130	+2.48%
2017	148	+2.63%
2023	152	+0.45%
Source: INSEE

== See also ==
- Communes of the Allier department
