= Saulzet =

- Commune
- Coat of arms
- Location of Saulzet
- Location within France Location within Auvergne-Rhône-Alpes
- Coordinates: 46°08′09″N 3°13′12″E
- Country: France
- Region: Auvergne-Rhône-Alpes
- Department: Allier
- Arrondissement: Vichy
- Canton: Gannat

Government
  - Mayor (2026–32): Magali Gaignon
- Area^{1}: 9.21 km^{2} (3.56 sq mi)
- Elevation: 340 m (1,120 ft)
- Highest elevation: 423 m (1,388 ft)
- Lowest elevation: 295 m (968 ft)
- Population (2023): 396
  - Density: 43.0/km^{2} (111/sq mi)
- Time zone: UTC+01:00 (CET)
  - Summer (DST): UTC+02:00 (CEST)
- INSEE/Postal code: 03268 /03800
- ^{1} French Land Register data, which excludes lakes, ponds, glaciers > 1 km^{2} (0.386 sq mi or 247 acres) and river estuaries.

Saulzet (French pronunciation: [solzɛ]; Occitan: Sauset) is a commune in the Allier department in Auvergne-Rhône-Alpes in central France.

== Population ==
Historical population
Year	Pop.	±% p.a.
1968	354	—
1975	316	−1.61%
1982	312	−0.18%
1990	340	+1.08%
1999	330	−0.33%
2007	336	+0.23%
2012	368	+1.84%
2017	387	+1.01%
2023	396	+0.38%
Source: INSEE

== See also ==
- Communes of the Allier department
