= Saint-Priest-d'Andelot =

- Commune
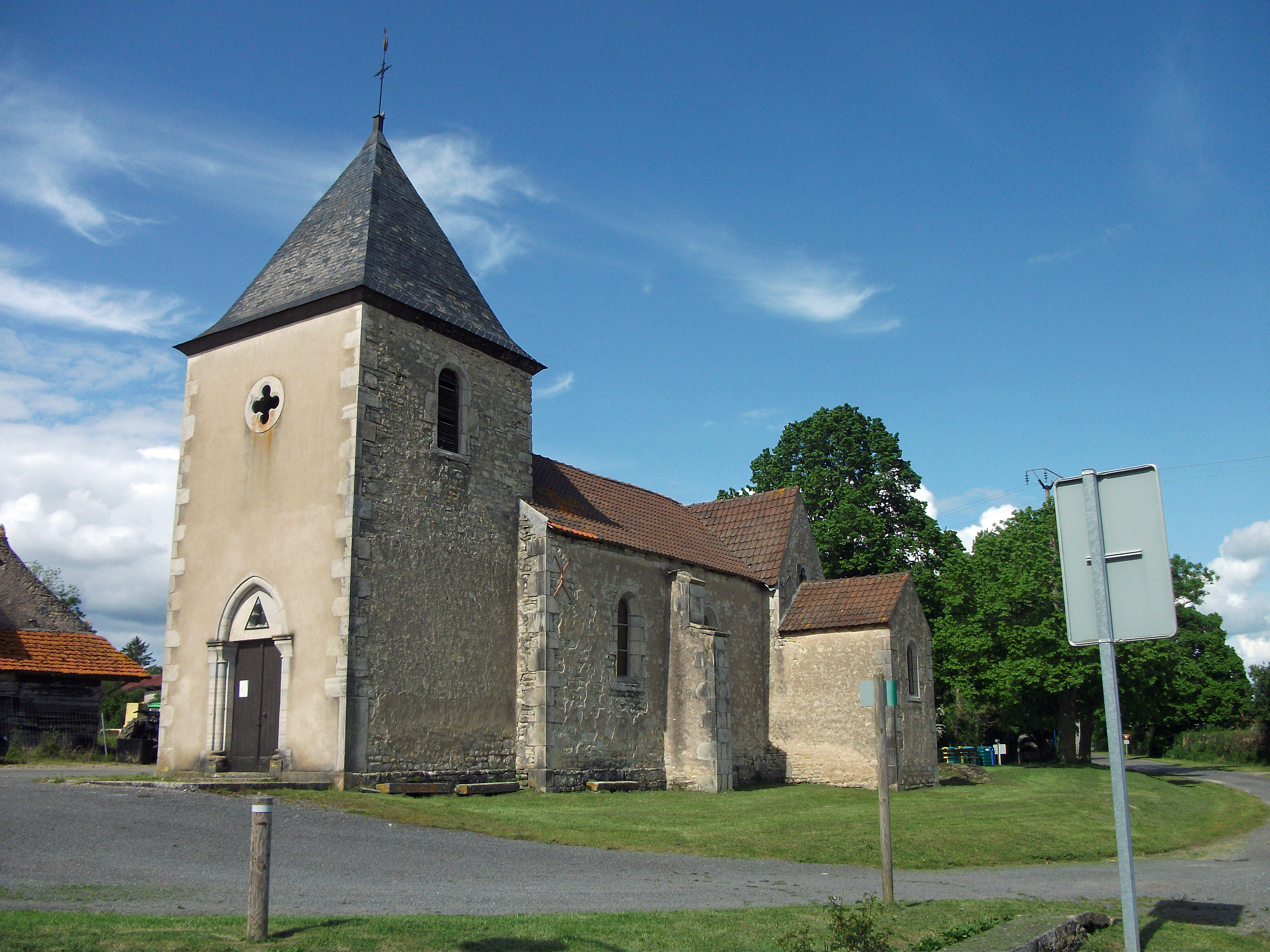
- Church
- Location of Saint-Priest-d'Andelot
- Location within France Location within Auvergne-Rhône-Alpes
- Coordinates: 46°04′19″N 3°10′04″E
- Country: France
- Region: Auvergne-Rhône-Alpes
- Department: Allier
- Arrondissement: Vichy
- Canton: Gannat
- Intercommunality: Saint-Pourçain Sioule Limagne

Government
  - Mayor (2026–32): Marie-Cécile Martin
- Area^{1}: 8.17 km^{2} (3.15 sq mi)
- Elevation: 424 m (1,391 ft)
- Highest elevation: 532 m (1,745 ft)
- Lowest elevation: 376 m (1,234 ft)
- Population (2023): 146
  - Density: 17.9/km^{2} (46.3/sq mi)
- Time zone: UTC+01:00 (CET)
  - Summer (DST): UTC+02:00 (CEST)
- INSEE/Postal code: 03255 /03800
- ^{1} French Land Register data, which excludes lakes, ponds, glaciers > 1 km^{2} (0.386 sq mi or 247 acres) and river estuaries.

Saint-Priest-d'Andelot (French pronunciation: [sɛ̃ pʁijɛ(st) dɑ̃dlo]) is a commune in the Allier department in Auvergne-Rhône-Alpes in central France.

== Population ==
Historical population
Year	Pop.	±% p.a.
1968	187	—
1975	168	−1.52%
1982	143	−2.28%
1990	134	−0.81%
1999	121	−1.13%
2007	131	+1.00%
2012	147	+2.33%
2017	145	−0.27%
2023	146	+0.11%
Source: INSEE

== See also ==
- Communes of the Allier department
