= Le Mayet-d'École =

- Commune
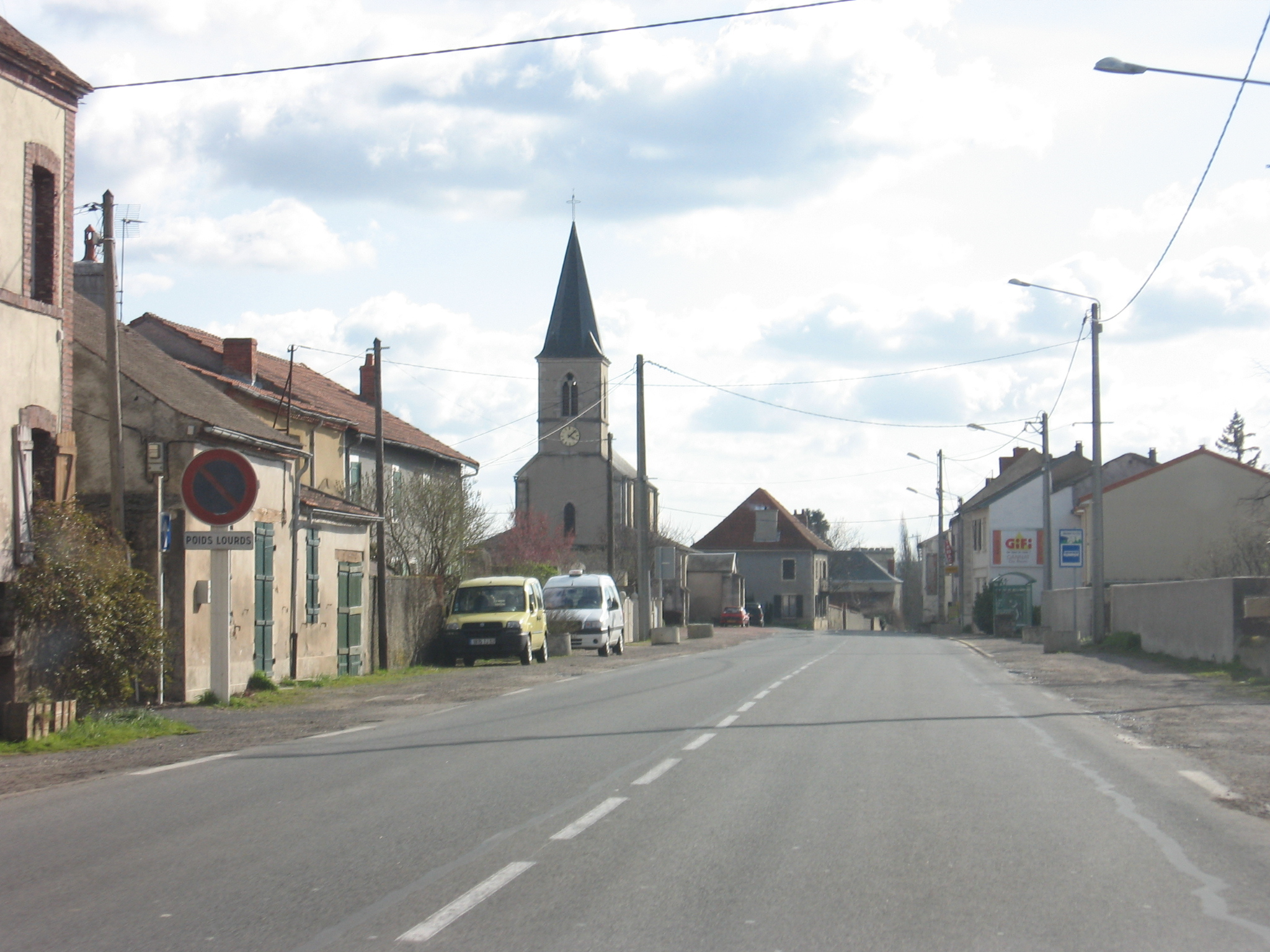
- The road into Le Mayet-d'École

- Coat of arms
- Location of Le Mayet-d'École
- Location within France Location within Auvergne-Rhône-Alpes
- Coordinates: 46°10′12″N 3°14′31″E
- Country: France
- Region: Auvergne-Rhône-Alpes
- Department: Allier
- Arrondissement: Vichy
- Canton: Gannat
- Intercommunality: Saint-Pourçain Sioule Limagne

Government
  - Mayor (2026–32): Arnaud Baugé
- Area^{1}: 6.76 km^{2} (2.61 sq mi)
- Elevation: 314 m (1,030 ft)
- Highest elevation: 320 m (1,050 ft)
- Lowest elevation: 269 m (883 ft)
- Population (2023): 304
  - Density: 45.0/km^{2} (116/sq mi)
- Time zone: UTC+01:00 (CET)
  - Summer (DST): UTC+02:00 (CEST)
- INSEE/Postal code: 03164 /03800
- ^{1} French Land Register data, which excludes lakes, ponds, glaciers > 1 km^{2} (0.386 sq mi or 247 acres) and river estuaries.

Le Mayet-d'École (French pronunciation: [lə majɛ dekɔl]) is a commune in the Allier department in central France.

== Population ==
Historical population
| Year | Pop. | ±% p.a. |
|---|---|---|
| 1968 | 296 | — |
| 1975 | 265 | −1.57% |
| 1982 | 236 | −1.64% |
| 1990 | 272 | +1.79% |
| 1999 | 260 | −0.50% |
| 2007 | 272 | +0.57% |
| 2012 | 278 | +0.44% |
| 2017 | 269 | −0.66% |
| 2023 | 304 | +2.06% |
Source: INSEE

== See also ==
- Communes of the Allier department
