= Mazerier =

- Commune
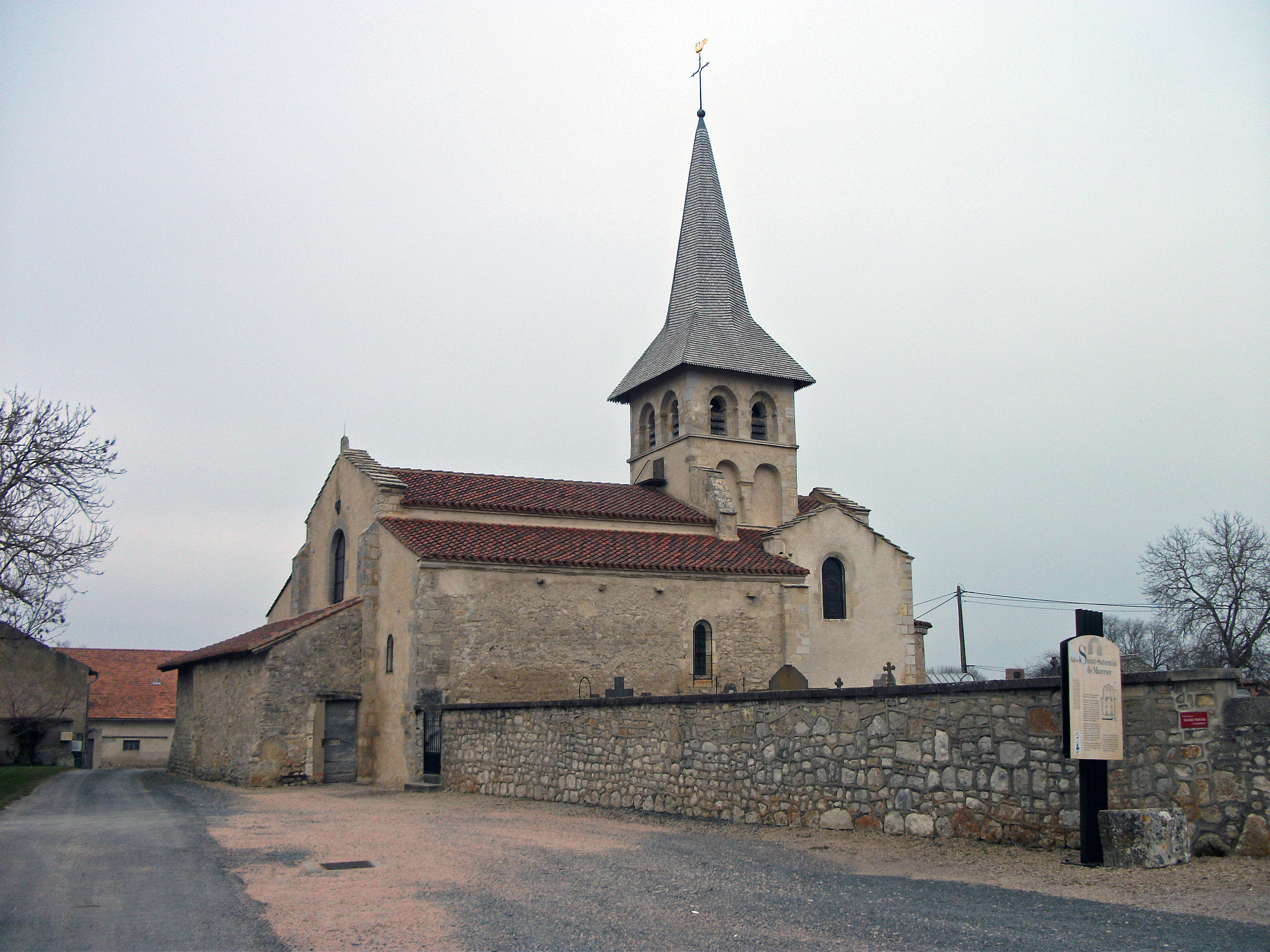
- Church St. Saturnin
- Location of Mazerier
- Location within France Location within Auvergne-Rhône-Alpes
- Coordinates: 46°07′34″N 3°11′28″E
- Country: France
- Region: Auvergne-Rhône-Alpes
- Department: Allier
- Arrondissement: Vichy
- Canton: Gannat
- Intercommunality: Saint-Pourçain Sioule Limagne

Government
  - Mayor (2026–32): Gérard Bournon
- Area^{1}: 7.23 km^{2} (2.79 sq mi)
- Elevation: 424 m (1,391 ft)
- Highest elevation: 461 m (1,512 ft)
- Lowest elevation: 290 m (950 ft)
- Population (2023): 317
  - Density: 43.8/km^{2} (114/sq mi)
- Time zone: UTC+01:00 (CET)
  - Summer (DST): UTC+02:00 (CEST)
- INSEE/Postal code: 03166 /03800
- ^{1} French Land Register data, which excludes lakes, ponds, glaciers > 1 km^{2} (0.386 sq mi or 247 acres) and river estuaries.

Mazerier (French pronunciation: [mazʁije]) is a commune in the Allier department in central France.

== Population ==
Historical population
Year	Pop.	±% p.a.
1968	286	—
1975	265	−1.08%
1982	302	+1.88%
1990	299	−0.12%
1999	278	−0.81%
2007	273	−0.23%
2012	290	+1.22%
2017	301	+0.75%
2023	317	+0.87%
Source: INSEE

== See also ==
- Communes of the Allier department
