= Voussac =

- Commune
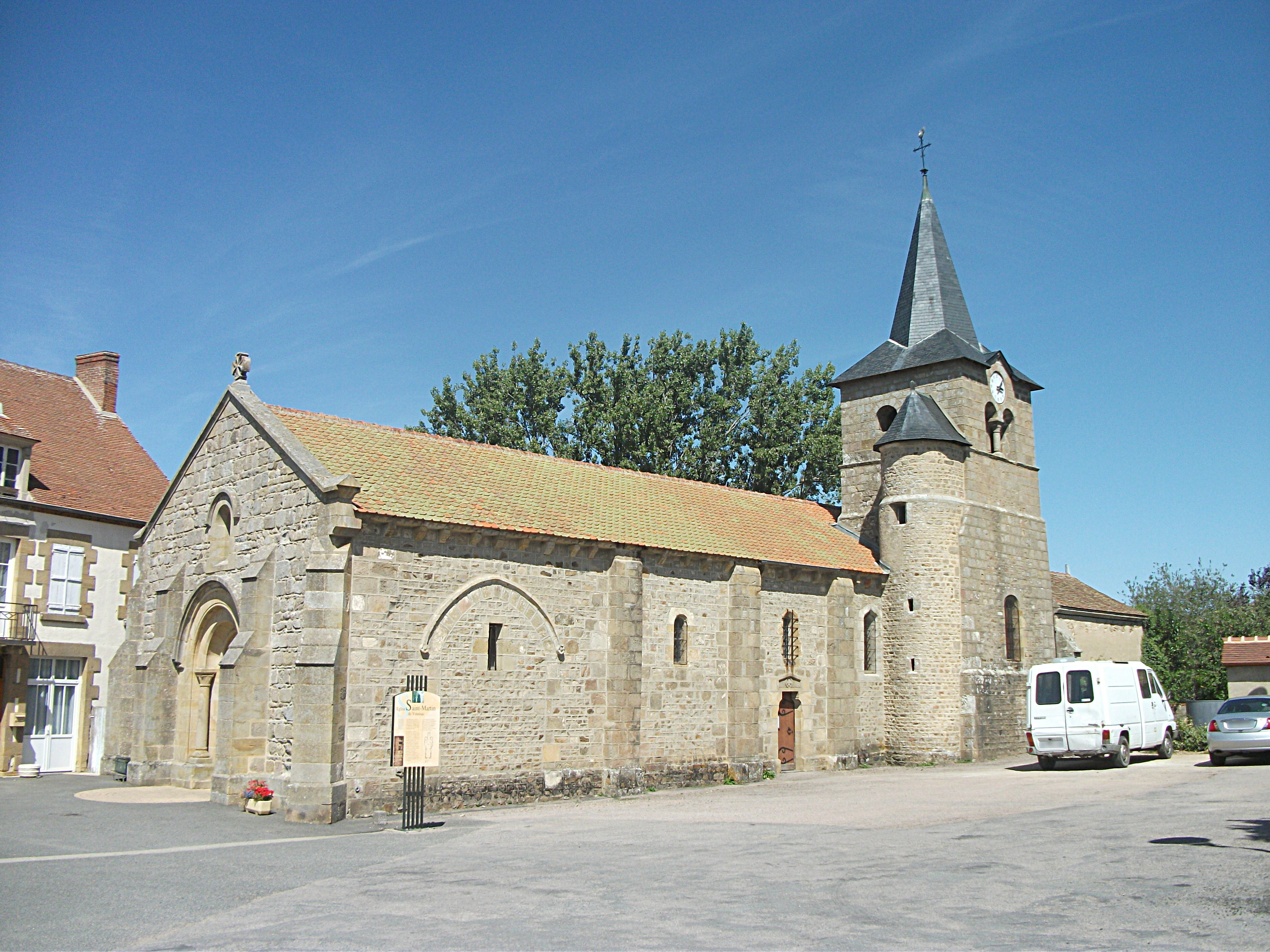
- Church Saint-Martin

- Coat of arms
- Location of Voussac
- Location within France Location within Auvergne-Rhône-Alpes
- Coordinates: 46°19′43″N 3°03′47″E
- Country: France
- Region: Auvergne-Rhône-Alpes
- Department: Allier
- Arrondissement: Montluçon
- Canton: Gannat
- Intercommunality: Commentry Montmarault Néris Communauté

Government
  - Mayor (2026–32): Isabelle Bidet
- Area^{1}: 34.46 km^{2} (13.31 sq mi)
- Elevation: 463 m (1,519 ft)
- Highest elevation: 467 m (1,532 ft)
- Lowest elevation: 359 m (1,178 ft)
- Population (2023): 494
  - Density: 14.3/km^{2} (37.1/sq mi)
- Time zone: UTC+01:00 (CET)
  - Summer (DST): UTC+02:00 (CEST)
- INSEE/Postal code: 03319 /03140
- ^{1} French Land Register data, which excludes lakes, ponds, glaciers > 1 km^{2} (0.386 sq mi or 247 acres) and river estuaries.

Voussac (French pronunciation: [vusak]; Occitan: Vosac) is a commune in the Allier department in Auvergne-Rhône-Alpes in central France.

== History ==
During Antiquity, the territory of Vosiacum was part of the territory of the Gallic people of the Bituriges Cubi.

In the Middle Ages, the commune was part of medieval Berry before passing into the modern-day province of Bourbonnais. The parish was part of the diocese of Bourges until the 1820s.

== Geography ==
Voussac is located on departmental road 46, the old Route national 146, which connects Montmarault to Saint-Pourçain-sur-Sioule. The commune is bordered by Deux-Chaises to the north, Le Theil to the northeast, Fleuriel to the southeast, Target to the south, and Saint-Marcel-en-Murat to the west.

The Vacheresse Forest occupies a notable portion of the commune's territory, to the south-east of the town.

The Venant, a tributary of the Bouble, crosses the commune, flowing from north to southwest. To the south, its wooded valley separates Voussac from Saint-Marcel-en-Murat.

== Climate ==
For the period 1971-2000, the average annual temperature was 10.3 °C, with an annual thermal range of 15.9 °C. The average annual cumulative precipitation was 803 mm, with 10.7 days of precipitation in January and 7.3 days in July. For the period 1991-2020, the average annual temperature observed at the nearest Météo-France meteorological station, in the town of Montmarault, 8 km as the crow flies, was 11.2 °C and the average annual cumulative of precipitation was 811.6 mm.

== Population ==
Historical population
Year	Pop.	±% p.a.
1968	680	—
1975	514	−3.92%
1982	458	−1.63%
1990	400	−1.68%
1999	458	+1.52%
2007	463	+0.14%
2012	464	+0.04%
2017	480	+0.68%
2023	494	+0.48%
Source: INSEE

== See also ==
- Communes of the Allier department
