= Jenzat =

- Commune
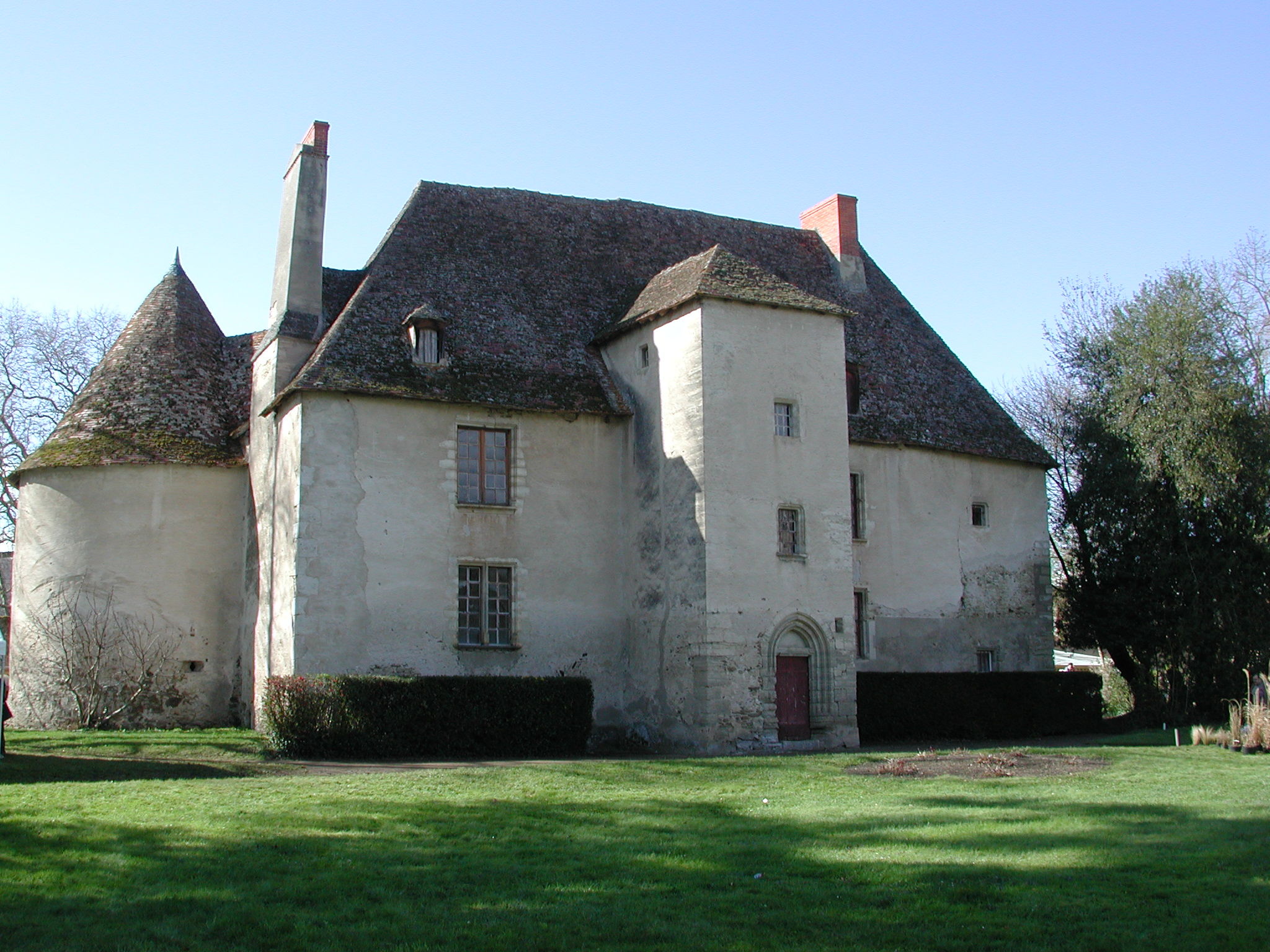
- Castle

- Coat of arms
- Location of Jenzat
- Location within France Location within Auvergne-Rhône-Alpes
- Coordinates: 46°09′41″N 3°11′45″E
- Country: France
- Region: Auvergne-Rhône-Alpes
- Department: Allier
- Arrondissement: Vichy
- Canton: Gannat

Government
  - Mayor (2026–32): Claire Mathieu-Portejoie
- Area^{1}: 11.64 km^{2} (4.49 sq mi)
- Elevation: 315 m (1,033 ft)
- Highest elevation: 449 m (1,473 ft)
- Lowest elevation: 274 m (899 ft)
- Population (2023): 517
  - Density: 44.4/km^{2} (115/sq mi)
- Time zone: UTC+01:00 (CET)
  - Summer (DST): UTC+02:00 (CEST)
- INSEE/Postal code: 03133 /03800
- ^{1} French Land Register data, which excludes lakes, ponds, glaciers > 1 km^{2} (0.386 sq mi or 247 acres) and river estuaries.

Jenzat (French pronunciation: [ʒɑ̃za]) is a commune in the Allier department in central France.

== Population ==
Historical population
Year	Pop.	±% p.a.
1968	492	—
1975	451	−1.24%
1982	422	−0.94%
1990	439	+0.49%
1999	450	+0.28%
2007	503	+1.40%
2012	527	+0.94%
2017	508	−0.73%
2023	517	+0.29%
Source: INSEE

== Neighboring Communities ==
There are six neighboring townships surrounding Jenzat:

- Charroux
- Saint-Bonnet-de-Rochefort
- Mazerier
- Saulzet
- Le Mayet-d'Ecole
- Saint-Germain-de-Salles

== See also ==
- Communes of the Allier department
