= Barberier =

- Commune
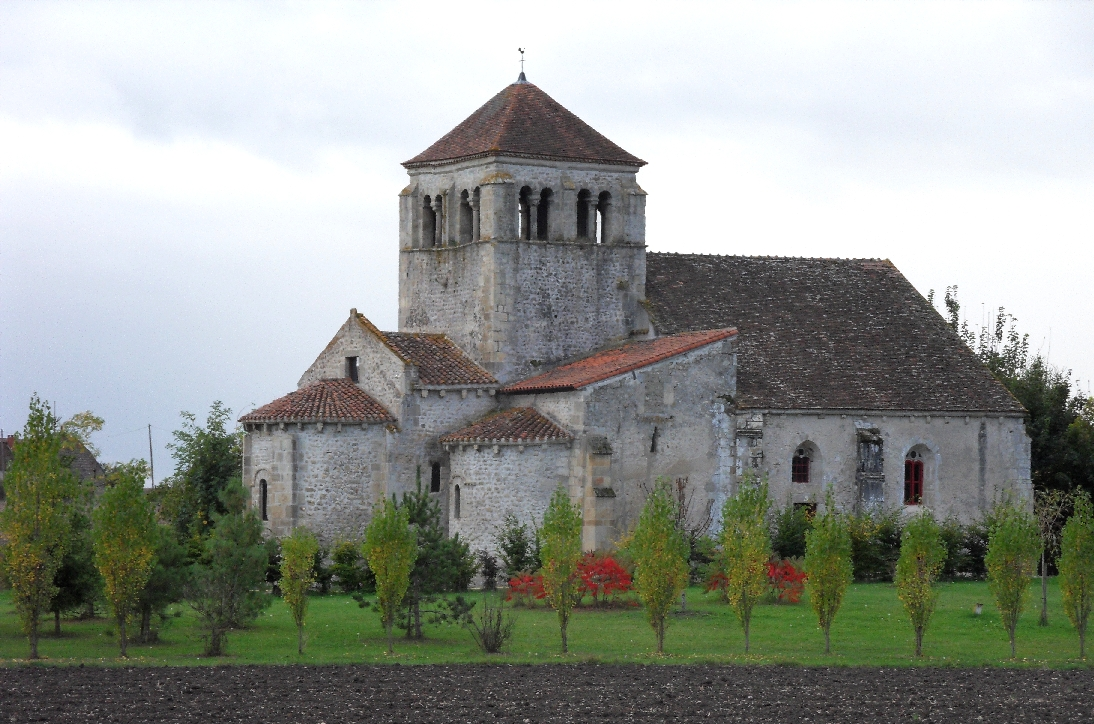
- The old Church of Saint André
- Location of Barberier
- Location within France Location within Auvergne-Rhône-Alpes
- Coordinates: 46°13′08″N 3°14′48″E
- Country: France
- Region: Auvergne-Rhône-Alpes
- Department: Allier
- Arrondissement: Vichy
- Canton: Gannat
- Intercommunality: Saint-Pourçain Sioule Limagne

Government
  - Mayor (2026–32): Gilles-Jean Portejoie
- Area^{1}: 8.08 km^{2} (3.12 sq mi)
- Elevation: 269 m (883 ft)
- Highest elevation: 290 m (950 ft)
- Lowest elevation: 254 m (833 ft)
- Population (2023): 150
  - Density: 19/km^{2} (48/sq mi)
- Time zone: UTC+01:00 (CET)
  - Summer (DST): UTC+02:00 (CEST)
- INSEE/Postal code: 03016 /03140
- ^{1} French Land Register data, which excludes lakes, ponds, glaciers > 1 km^{2} (0.386 sq mi or 247 acres) and river estuaries.

Barberier (French pronunciation: [baʁbəʁje]) is a commune in the Allier department in the Auvergne-Rhône-Alpes region of central France.

== Geography ==
Barberier is located some 17 km (11 mi) north-west of Vichy and some 17 km (11 mi) north by north-east of Gannat. Access to the commune is by the D36 road from Étroussat in the west which passes through the centre of the commune and the village and continues east to join the D2009 east of the commune. The D183 comes from Bayet in the north and also passes through the centre of the commune, intersecting the D36 at the village, continuing south to join the D66 south of the commune. Apart from the village there are the hamlets of Les Varennes in the south, La Grange Neuve in the east, and Bompré in the north.

The Sioule river flows north along the south-eastern border of the commune and continues north to join the Allier north-east of Contigny.

== History ==
Barberier appears as Barbrier on the 1750 Cassini Map and the same the 1790 version.

== Demography ==
Historical population

Year	Pop.	±% p.a.
1793	310	—
1821	379	+0.72%
1846	352	−0.30%
1872	365	+0.14%
1901	303	−0.64%
1921	287	−0.27%
1936	221	−1.73%
1946	255	+1.44%
1954	225	−1.55%
1962	207	−1.04%

Year	Pop.	±% p.a.
1968	170	−3.23%
1975	125	−4.30%
1982	106	−2.33%
1990	108	+0.23%
1999	107	−0.10%
2007	123	+1.76%
2012	131	+1.27%
2017	143	+1.77%
2023	150	+0.80%

Source: EHESS and INSEE

== Sites and monuments ==
There are two sites in the commune that are registered as historical monuments:

- The Château of Bompré (15th century)
- The old Church of Saint André (12th century)

== See also ==
- Communes of the Allier department

=== Bibliography ===
- Raymond d'Azémar, Étroussat, Barberier. Municipal Chronicles from the Revolution to today, Montluçon, 1983 (in French)
