= Vicq, Allier =

Vicq
- Commune
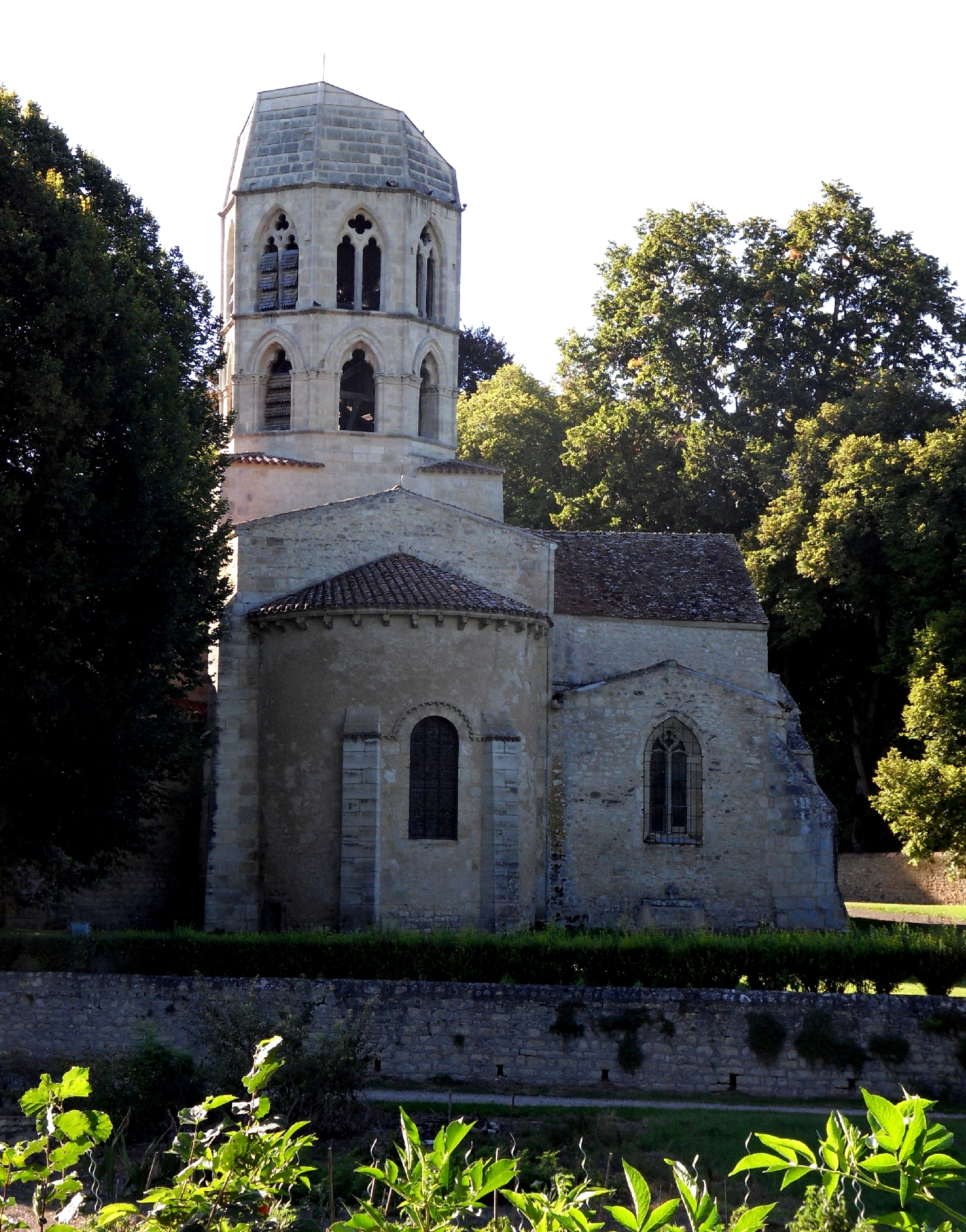
- The church in Vicq
- Location of Vicq
- Location within France Location within Auvergne-Rhône-Alpes
- Coordinates: 46°08′52″N 3°05′34″E
- Country: France
- Region: Auvergne-Rhône-Alpes
- Department: Allier
- Arrondissement: Vichy
- Canton: Gannat
- Intercommunality: Saint-Pourçain Sioule Limagne

Government
  - Mayor (2026–32): Danièle Benayon
- Area^{1}: 13.25 km^{2} (5.12 sq mi)
- Elevation: 326 m (1,070 ft)
- Highest elevation: 437 m (1,434 ft)
- Lowest elevation: 302 m (991 ft)
- Population (2023): 291
  - Density: 22.0/km^{2} (56.9/sq mi)
- Time zone: UTC+01:00 (CET)
  - Summer (DST): UTC+02:00 (CEST)
- INSEE/Postal code: 03311 /03450
- ^{1} French Land Register data, which excludes lakes, ponds, glaciers > 1 km^{2} (0.386 sq mi or 247 acres) and river estuaries.

Vicq (French pronunciation: [vik]; Occitan: Vic) is a commune in the Allier department in Auvergne-Rhône-Alpes in central France.

Vicq comes from vicus, which means central Gallo-Roman administration, on a local scale.

== Geography ==
It is located 13 km from Gannat, 33 km from Vichy and 5 km from Ébreuil.

== Administration ==
List of mayors
Term	Name
2001–2014	Jean-François Henry
2014–2018	Pierre Lenvoisé
2018-	Danièle Benayon

== Population ==
Historical population
Year	Pop.	±% p.a.
1968	430	—
1975	342	−3.22%
1982	315	−1.17%
1990	310	−0.20%
1999	300	−0.36%
2007	321	+0.85%
2012	324	+0.19%
2017	331	+0.43%
2023	291	−2.12%
Source: INSEE

Its inhabitants are called Vicquois in French.

== Sights ==
- The 11th-13th century Romanesque church of Saint Maurice, classified as a historic site in 1911.

== See also ==
- Communes of the Allier department
