= Coutansouze =

- Commune
- Location of Coutansouze
- Location within France Location within Auvergne-Rhône-Alpes
- Coordinates: 46°13′08″N 3°00′41″E
- Country: France
- Region: Auvergne-Rhône-Alpes
- Department: Allier
- Arrondissement: Vichy
- Canton: Gannat
- Intercommunality: Saint-Pourçain Sioule Limagne

Government
  - Mayor (2026–32): Denis James
- Area^{1}: 13.42 km^{2} (5.18 sq mi)
- Elevation: 505 m (1,657 ft)
- Highest elevation: 671 m (2,201 ft)
- Lowest elevation: 379 m (1,243 ft)
- Population (2023): 154
  - Density: 11.5/km^{2} (29.7/sq mi)
- Time zone: UTC+01:00 (CET)
  - Summer (DST): UTC+02:00 (CEST)
- INSEE/Postal code: 03089 /03330
- ^{1} French Land Register data, which excludes lakes, ponds, glaciers > 1 km^{2} (0.386 sq mi or 247 acres) and river estuaries.

Coutansouze (French pronunciation: [kutɑ̃suz]; Occitan: Costansosa) is a commune in the Allier department in central France.

== Population ==
Historical population
| Year | Pop. | ±% p.a. |
|---|---|---|
| 1968 | 179 | — |
| 1975 | 155 | −2.04% |
| 1982 | 129 | −2.59% |
| 1990 | 103 | −2.77% |
| 1999 | 109 | +0.63% |
| 2007 | 126 | +1.83% |
| 2012 | 131 | +0.78% |
| 2017 | 154 | +3.29% |
| 2023 | 154 | +0.00% |
Source: INSEE

== See also ==
- Communes of the Allier department
