= Nades =

- Commune
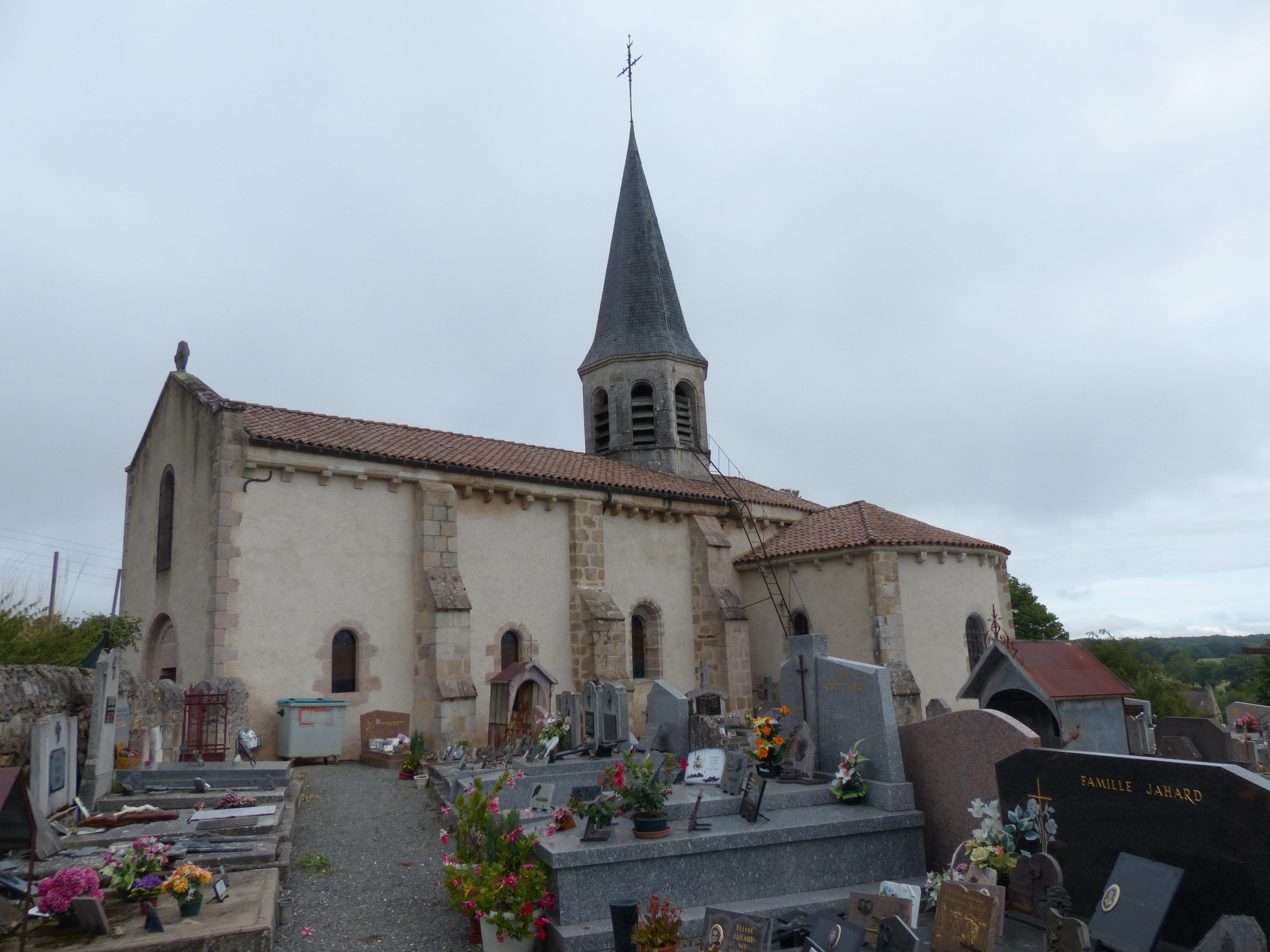
- Eglise de Nades (Allier)

- Coat of arms
- Location of Nades
- Location within France Location within Auvergne-Rhône-Alpes
- Coordinates: 46°09′32″N 2°58′05″E
- Country: France
- Region: Auvergne-Rhône-Alpes
- Department: Allier
- Arrondissement: Vichy
- Canton: Gannat
- Intercommunality: Saint-Pourçain Sioule Limagne

Government
  - Mayor (2026–32): Henri-Claude Buvat
- Area^{1}: 8.49 km^{2} (3.28 sq mi)
- Elevation: 650 m (2,130 ft)
- Highest elevation: 734 m (2,408 ft)
- Lowest elevation: 394 m (1,293 ft)
- Population (2023): 162
  - Density: 19.1/km^{2} (49.4/sq mi)
- Time zone: UTC+01:00 (CET)
  - Summer (DST): UTC+02:00 (CEST)
- INSEE/Postal code: 03192 /03450
- ^{1} French Land Register data, which excludes lakes, ponds, glaciers > 1 km^{2} (0.386 sq mi or 247 acres) and river estuaries.

Nades (French pronunciation: [nad]) is a commune in the Allier department in the Auvergne region in central France.

== Population ==
Historical population
Year	Pop.	±% p.a.
1968	176	—
1975	127	−4.55%
1982	133	+0.66%
1990	108	−2.57%
1999	135	+2.51%
2007	122	−1.26%
2012	147	+3.80%
2017	153	+0.80%
2023	162	+0.96%
Source: INSEE

== See also ==
- Communes of the Allier department
