= Lalizolle =

- Commune
- Location of Lalizolle
- Location within France Location within Auvergne-Rhône-Alpes
- Coordinates: 46°09′27″N 3°00′08″E
- Country: France
- Region: Auvergne-Rhône-Alpes
- Department: Allier
- Arrondissement: Vichy
- Canton: Gannat
- Intercommunality: Saint-Pourçain Sioule Limagne

Government
  - Mayor (2026–32): Sylvain Conduche
- Area^{1}: 23.72 km^{2} (9.16 sq mi)
- Elevation: 425 m (1,394 ft)
- Highest elevation: 729 m (2,392 ft)
- Lowest elevation: 415 m (1,362 ft)
- Population (2023): 399
  - Density: 16.8/km^{2} (43.6/sq mi)
- Time zone: UTC+01:00 (CET)
  - Summer (DST): UTC+02:00 (CEST)
- INSEE/Postal code: 03135 /03450
- ^{1} French Land Register data, which excludes lakes, ponds, glaciers > 1 km^{2} (0.386 sq mi or 247 acres) and river estuaries.

Lalizolle (French pronunciation: [lalizɔl]; Occitan: La Gleisola) is a commune in the Allier department in central France.

== Population ==
Historical population
Year	Pop.	±% p.a.
1968	525	—
1975	473	−1.48%
1982	375	−3.26%
1990	347	−0.97%
1999	308	−1.32%
2007	368	+2.25%
2012	352	−0.89%
2017	380	+1.54%
2023	399	+0.82%
Source: INSEE

== See also ==
- Communes of the Allier department
