= Valignat =

- Commune
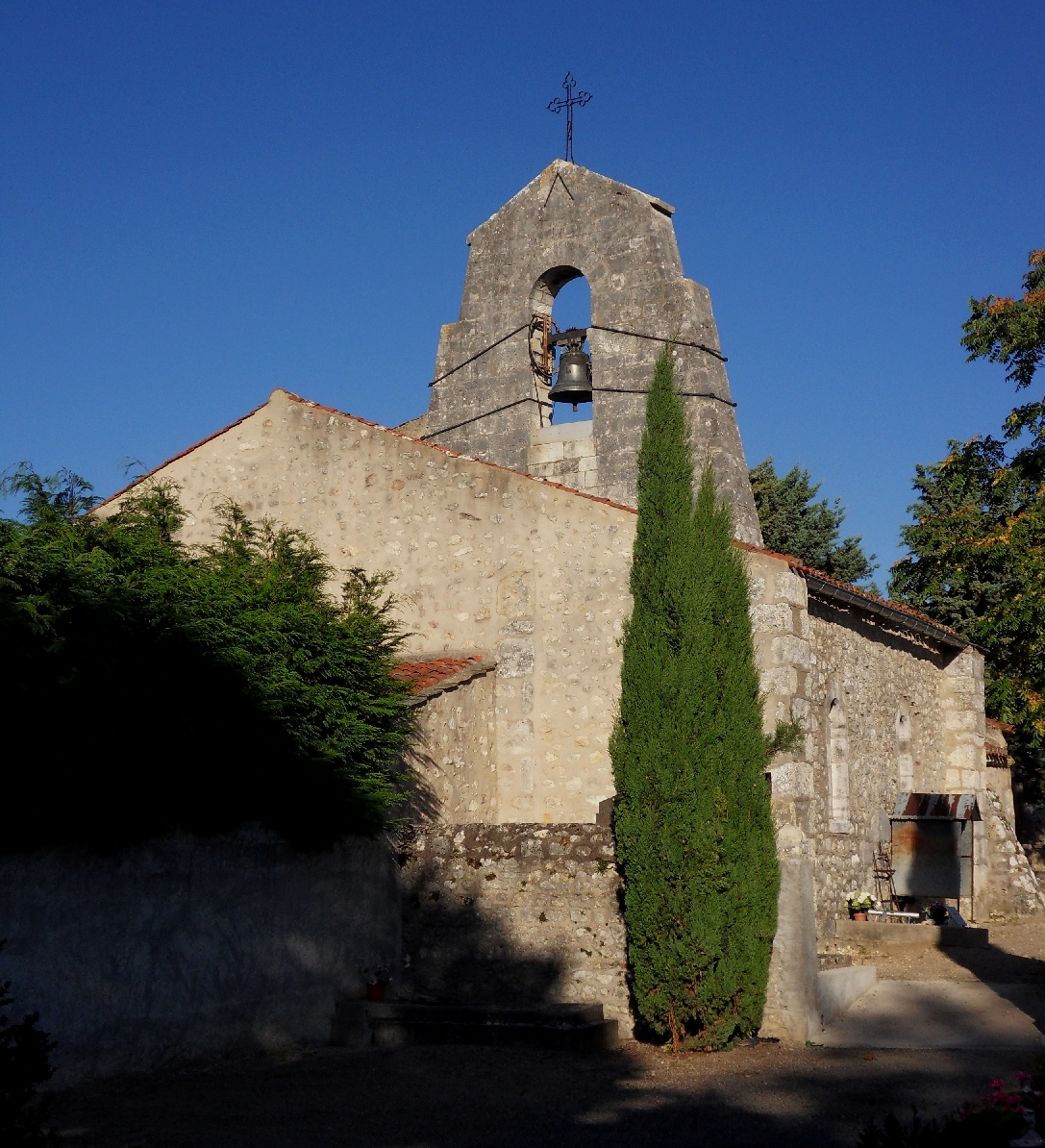
- The church in Valignat
- Location of Valignat
- Location within France Location within Auvergne-Rhône-Alpes
- Coordinates: 46°10′39″N 3°04′34″E
- Country: France
- Region: Auvergne-Rhône-Alpes
- Department: Allier
- Arrondissement: Vichy
- Canton: Gannat
- Intercommunality: Saint-Pourçain Sioule Limagne

Government
  - Mayor (2026–32): Magalli Blaes
- Area^{1}: 2.32 km^{2} (0.90 sq mi)
- Elevation: 465 m (1,526 ft)
- Highest elevation: 467 m (1,532 ft)
- Lowest elevation: 353 m (1,158 ft)
- Population (2023): 64
  - Density: 28/km^{2} (71/sq mi)
- Time zone: UTC+01:00 (CET)
  - Summer (DST): UTC+02:00 (CEST)
- INSEE/Postal code: 03295 /03330
- ^{1} French Land Register data, which excludes lakes, ponds, glaciers > 1 km^{2} (0.386 sq mi or 247 acres) and river estuaries.

Valignat (French pronunciation: [valiɲa]; Occitan: Valinhac) is a commune in the Allier department in Auvergne-Rhône-Alpes in central France.

== Population ==
Historical population
Year	Pop.	±% p.a.
1968	87	—
1975	52	−7.09%
1982	47	−1.43%
1990	42	−1.40%
1999	57	+3.45%
2007	69	+2.42%
2012	80	+3.00%
2017	77	−0.76%
2023	64	−3.04%
Source: INSEE

== See also ==
- Communes of the Allier department
