= Sussat =

- Commune
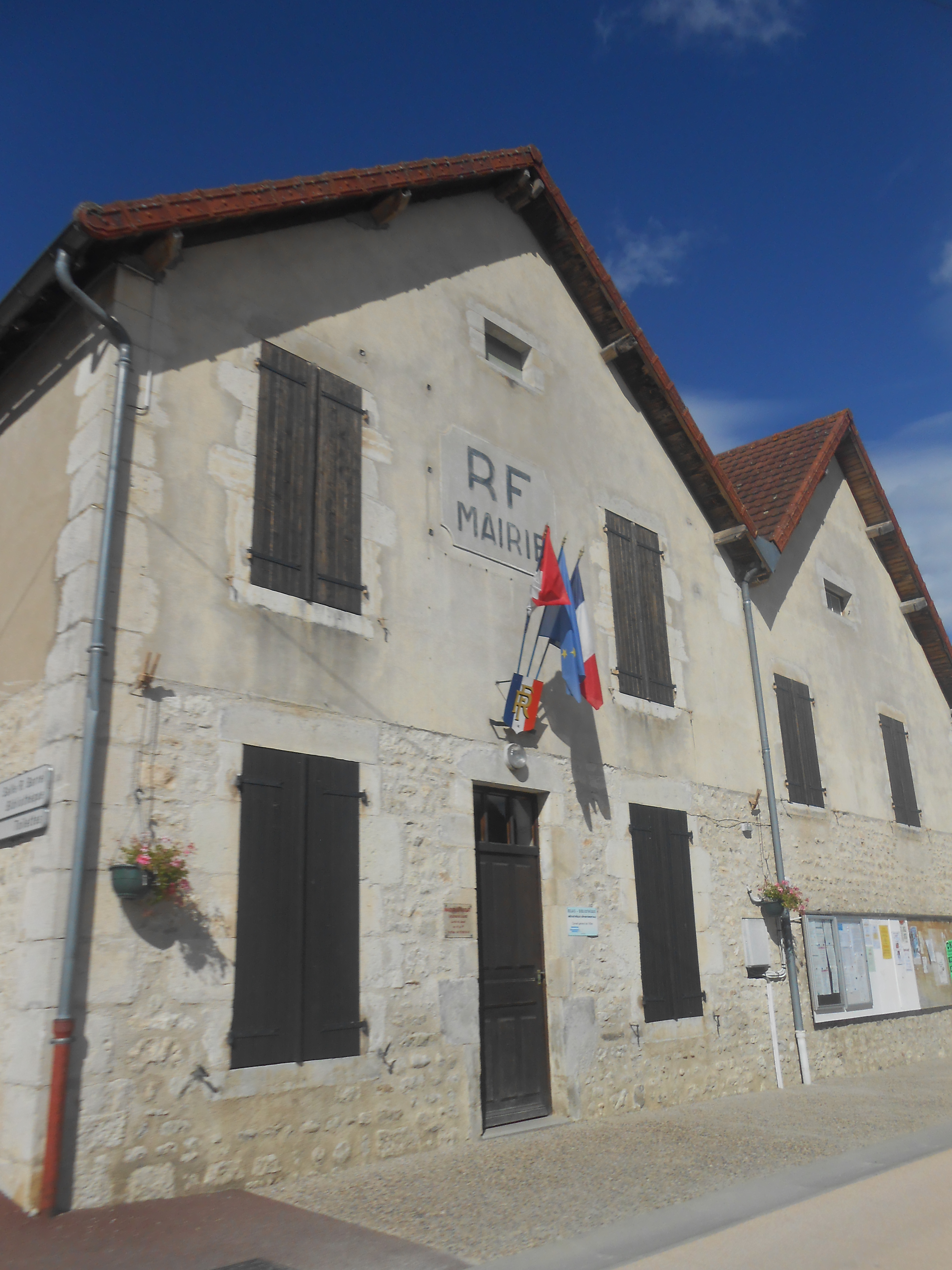
- Town hall
- Location of Sussat
- Location within France Location within Auvergne-Rhône-Alpes
- Coordinates: 46°09′12″N 3°03′52″E
- Country: France
- Region: Auvergne-Rhône-Alpes
- Department: Allier
- Arrondissement: Vichy
- Canton: Gannat
- Intercommunality: Saint-Pourçain Sioule Limagne

Government
  - Mayor (2026–32): Deny Derouet
- Area^{1}: 8 km^{2} (3.1 sq mi)
- Elevation: 360 m (1,180 ft)
- Highest elevation: 516 m (1,693 ft)
- Lowest elevation: 349 m (1,145 ft)
- Population (2023): 107
  - Density: 13/km^{2} (35/sq mi)
- Time zone: UTC+01:00 (CET)
  - Summer (DST): UTC+02:00 (CEST)
- INSEE/Postal code: 03276 /03450
- ^{1} French Land Register data, which excludes lakes, ponds, glaciers > 1 km^{2} (0.386 sq mi or 247 acres) and river estuaries.

Sussat (French pronunciation: [sysa]; Occitan: Suçat) is a commune in the Allier department in Auvergne-Rhône-Alpes in central France.

The romanesque church of Saint Bonnet was, in the Middle Ages, under the patronage of the powerful Benedictine abbey of Menat.

== Population ==
Historical population
Year	Pop.	±% p.a.
1968	137	—
1975	90	−5.83%
1982	92	+0.31%
1990	79	−1.89%
1999	104	+3.10%
2007	103	−0.12%
2012	102	−0.19%
2017	101	−0.20%
2023	107	+0.97%
Source: INSEE

== See also ==
- Communes of the Allier department
