= Saint-Germain-de-Salles =

- Commune
- Location of Saint-Germain-de-Salles
- Location within France Location within Auvergne-Rhône-Alpes
- Coordinates: 46°10′48″N 3°12′52″E
- Country: France
- Region: Auvergne-Rhône-Alpes
- Department: Allier
- Arrondissement: Vichy
- Canton: Gannat

Government
  - Mayor (2026–32): Philippe De Libero
- Area^{1}: 11.59 km^{2} (4.47 sq mi)
- Elevation: 300 m (980 ft)
- Highest elevation: 374 m (1,227 ft)
- Lowest elevation: 262 m (860 ft)
- Population (2023): 434
  - Density: 37.4/km^{2} (97.0/sq mi)
- Time zone: UTC+01:00 (CET)
  - Summer (DST): UTC+02:00 (CEST)
- INSEE/Postal code: 03237 /03140
- ^{1} French Land Register data, which excludes lakes, ponds, glaciers > 1 km^{2} (0.386 sq mi or 247 acres) and river estuaries.

Saint-Germain-de-Salles (French pronunciation: [sɛ̃ ʒɛʁmɛ̃ də sal]) is a commune in the Allier department in Auvergne-Rhône-Alpes in central France.

== Population ==
Historical population
Year	Pop.	±% p.a.
1968	509	—
1975	473	−1.04%
1982	466	−0.21%
1990	445	−0.57%
1999	412	−0.85%
2007	435	+0.68%
2012	437	+0.09%
2017	425	−0.56%
2023	434	+0.35%
Source: INSEE

== See also ==
- Communes of the Allier department
