= Chouvigny =

- Commune
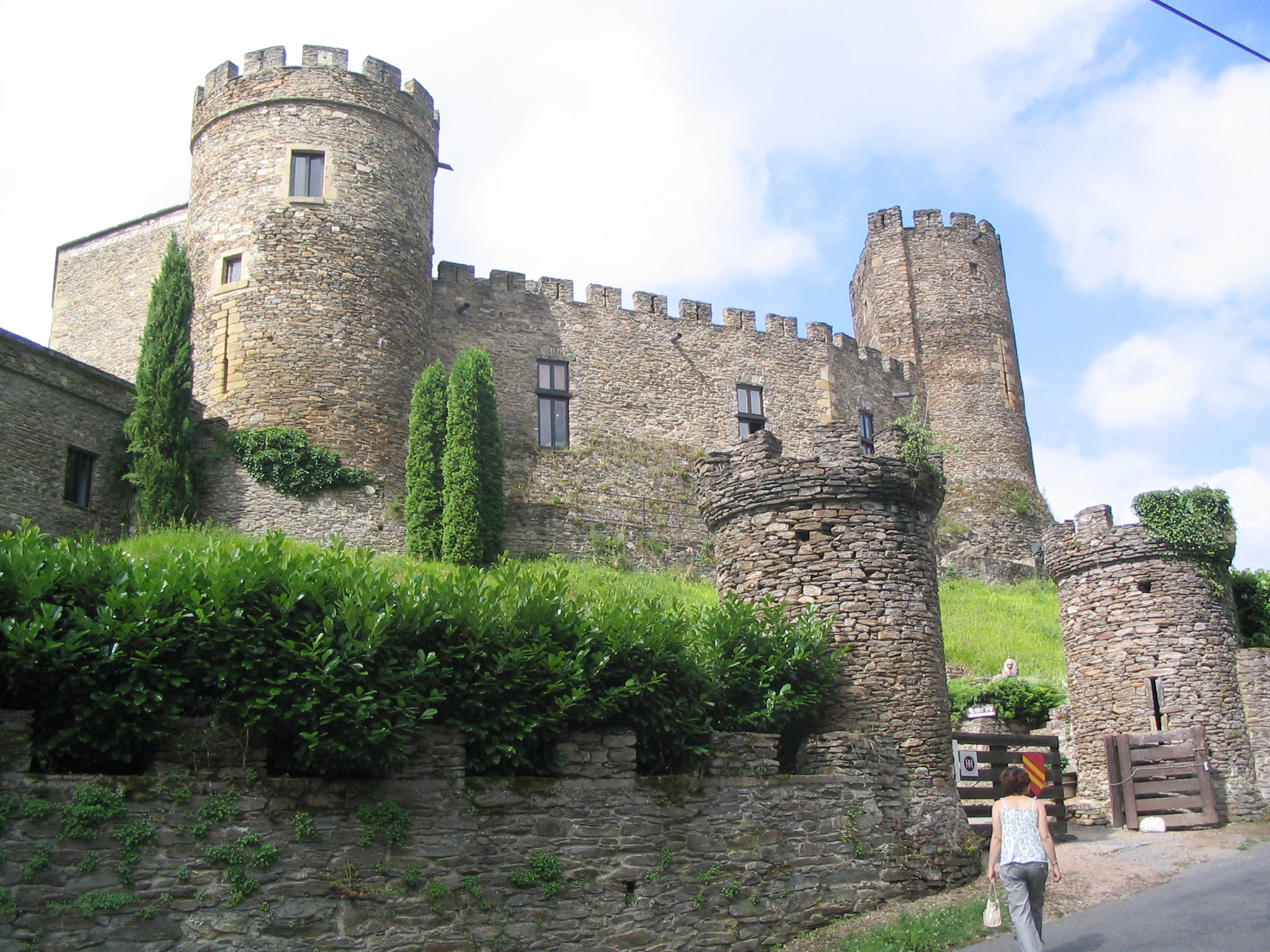
- The castle in Chouvigny

- Coat of arms
- Location of Chouvigny
- Location within France Location within Auvergne-Rhône-Alpes
- Coordinates: 46°07′37″N 2°59′30″E
- Country: France
- Region: Auvergne-Rhône-Alpes
- Department: Allier
- Arrondissement: Vichy
- Canton: Gannat

Government
  - Mayor (2026–32): Jacques Beyssade
- Area^{1}: 13.41 km^{2} (5.18 sq mi)
- Elevation: 471 m (1,545 ft)
- Highest elevation: 584 m (1,916 ft)
- Lowest elevation: 310 m (1,020 ft)
- Population (2023): 232
  - Density: 17.3/km^{2} (44.8/sq mi)
- Time zone: UTC+01:00 (CET)
  - Summer (DST): UTC+02:00 (CEST)
- INSEE/Postal code: 03078 /03450
- ^{1} French Land Register data, which excludes lakes, ponds, glaciers > 1 km^{2} (0.386 sq mi or 247 acres) and river estuaries.

Chouvigny (French pronunciation: [ʃuviɲi]; Occitan: Chalvinhet) is a commune in the Allier department in central France.

== Population ==
Historical population
Year	Pop.	±% p.a.
1968	349	—
1975	265	−3.86%
1982	255	−0.55%
1990	240	−0.75%
1999	238	−0.09%
2007	239	+0.05%
2012	225	−1.20%
2017	227	+0.18%
2023	232	+0.36%
Source: INSEE

== See also ==
- Communes of the Allier department
