= Naves, Allier =

Naves
- Commune
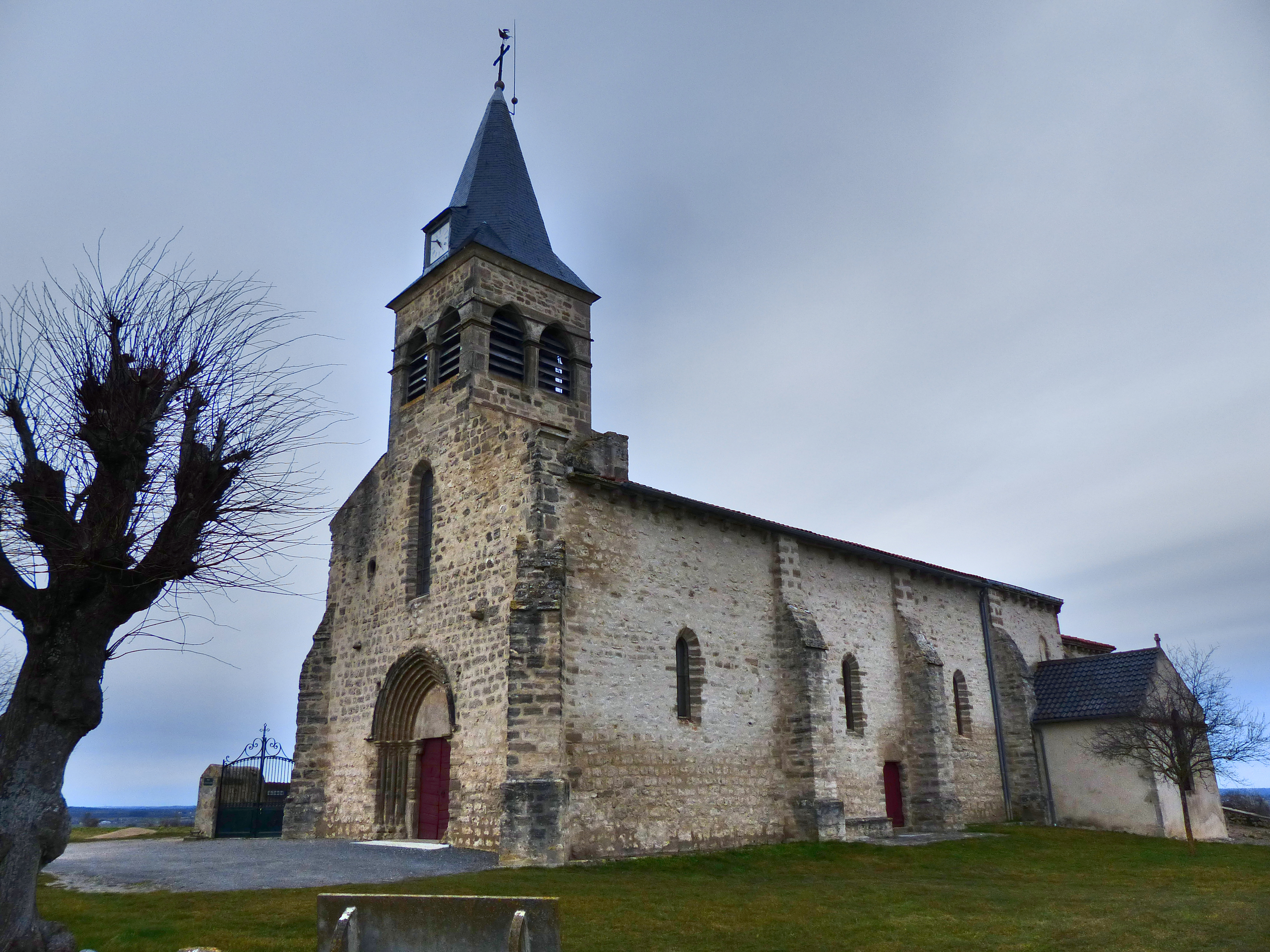
- The church in Naves
- Location of Naves
- Location within France Location within Auvergne-Rhône-Alpes
- Coordinates: 46°10′33″N 3°06′36″E
- Country: France
- Region: Auvergne-Rhône-Alpes
- Department: Allier
- Arrondissement: Vichy
- Canton: Gannat

Government
  - Mayor (2026–32): Daniel Reboul
- Area^{1}: 8.13 km^{2} (3.14 sq mi)
- Elevation: 400 m (1,300 ft)
- Highest elevation: 433 m (1,421 ft)
- Lowest elevation: 296 m (971 ft)
- Population (2023): 146
  - Density: 18.0/km^{2} (46.5/sq mi)
- Time zone: UTC+01:00 (CET)
  - Summer (DST): UTC+02:00 (CEST)
- INSEE/Postal code: 03194 /03330
- ^{1} French Land Register data, which excludes lakes, ponds, glaciers > 1 km^{2} (0.386 sq mi or 247 acres) and river estuaries.

Naves (French pronunciation: [nav]; Auvergnat: Navas) is a commune in the Allier department in Auvergne in central France.

== Population ==
Historical population
Year	Pop.	±% p.a.
1968	210	—
1975	179	−2.26%
1982	129	−4.57%
1990	108	−2.20%
1999	109	+0.10%
2007	115	+0.67%
2012	115	+0.00%
2017	119	+0.69%
2023	146	+3.47%
Source: INSEE

== See also ==
- Communes of the Allier department
