= Veauce =

- Commune
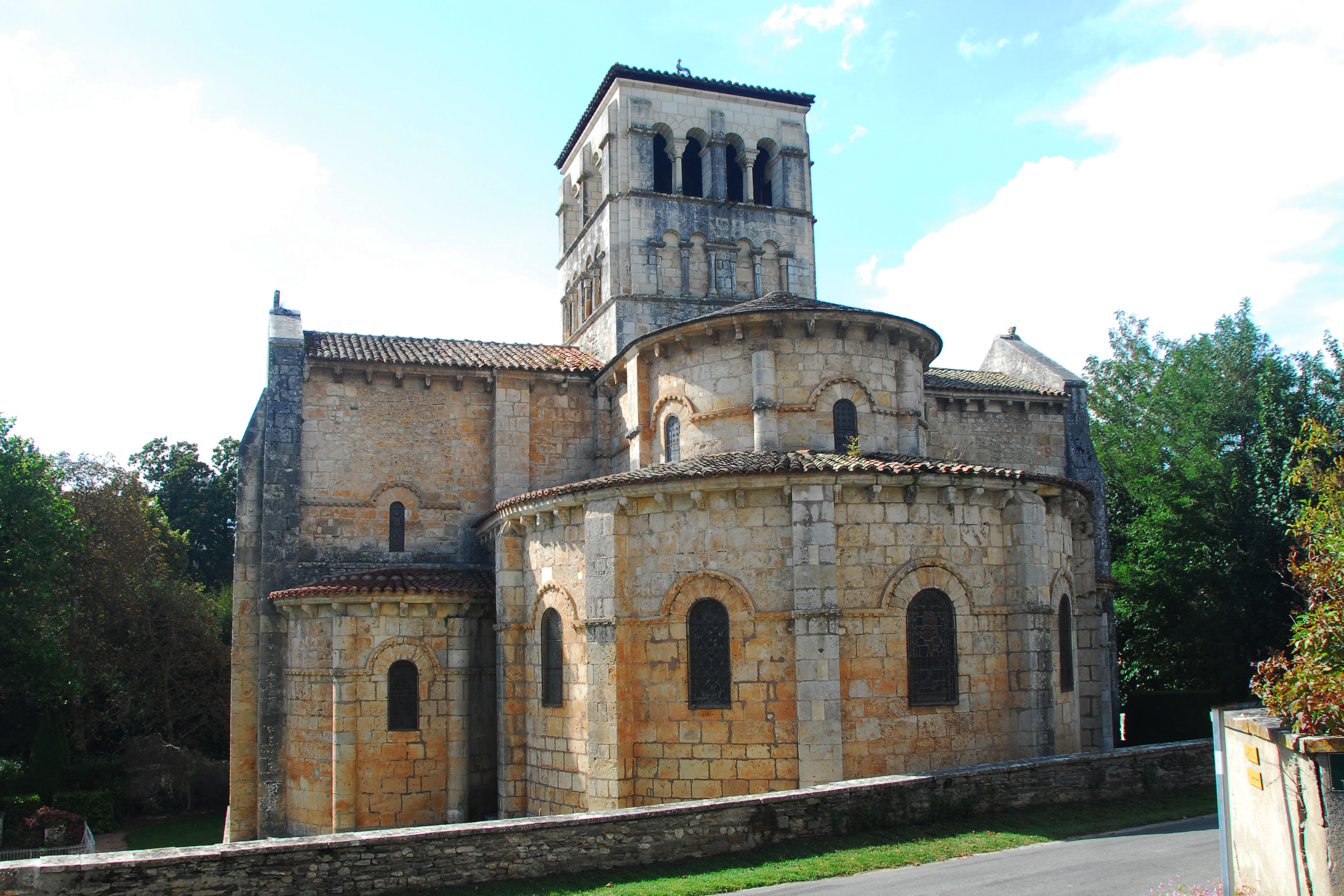
- The church in Veauce
- Location of Veauce
- Location within France Location within Auvergne-Rhône-Alpes
- Coordinates: 46°09′57″N 3°03′27″E
- Country: France
- Region: Auvergne-Rhône-Alpes
- Department: Allier
- Arrondissement: Vichy
- Canton: Gannat
- Intercommunality: Saint-Pourçain Sioule Limagne

Government
  - Mayor (2026–32): Didier Guillot
- Area^{1}: 3.54 km^{2} (1.37 sq mi)
- Elevation: 468 m (1,535 ft)
- Highest elevation: 505 m (1,657 ft)
- Lowest elevation: 363 m (1,191 ft)
- Population (2023): 40
  - Density: 11/km^{2} (29/sq mi)
- Time zone: UTC+01:00 (CET)
  - Summer (DST): UTC+02:00 (CEST)
- INSEE/Postal code: 03302 /03450
- ^{1} French Land Register data, which excludes lakes, ponds, glaciers > 1 km^{2} (0.386 sq mi or 247 acres) and river estuaries.

Veauce (French pronunciation: [vos]) is a commune in the Allier department in Auvergne-Rhône-Alpes in central France.

== Population ==
Historical population
Year	Pop.	±% p.a.
1968	60	—
1975	44	−4.33%
1982	36	−2.83%
1990	30	−2.25%
1999	46	+4.86%
2007	41	−1.43%
2012	38	−1.51%
2017	38	+0.00%
2023	40	+0.86%
Source: INSEE

== See also ==
- Communes of the Allier department
