= Ussel-d'Allier =

- Commune
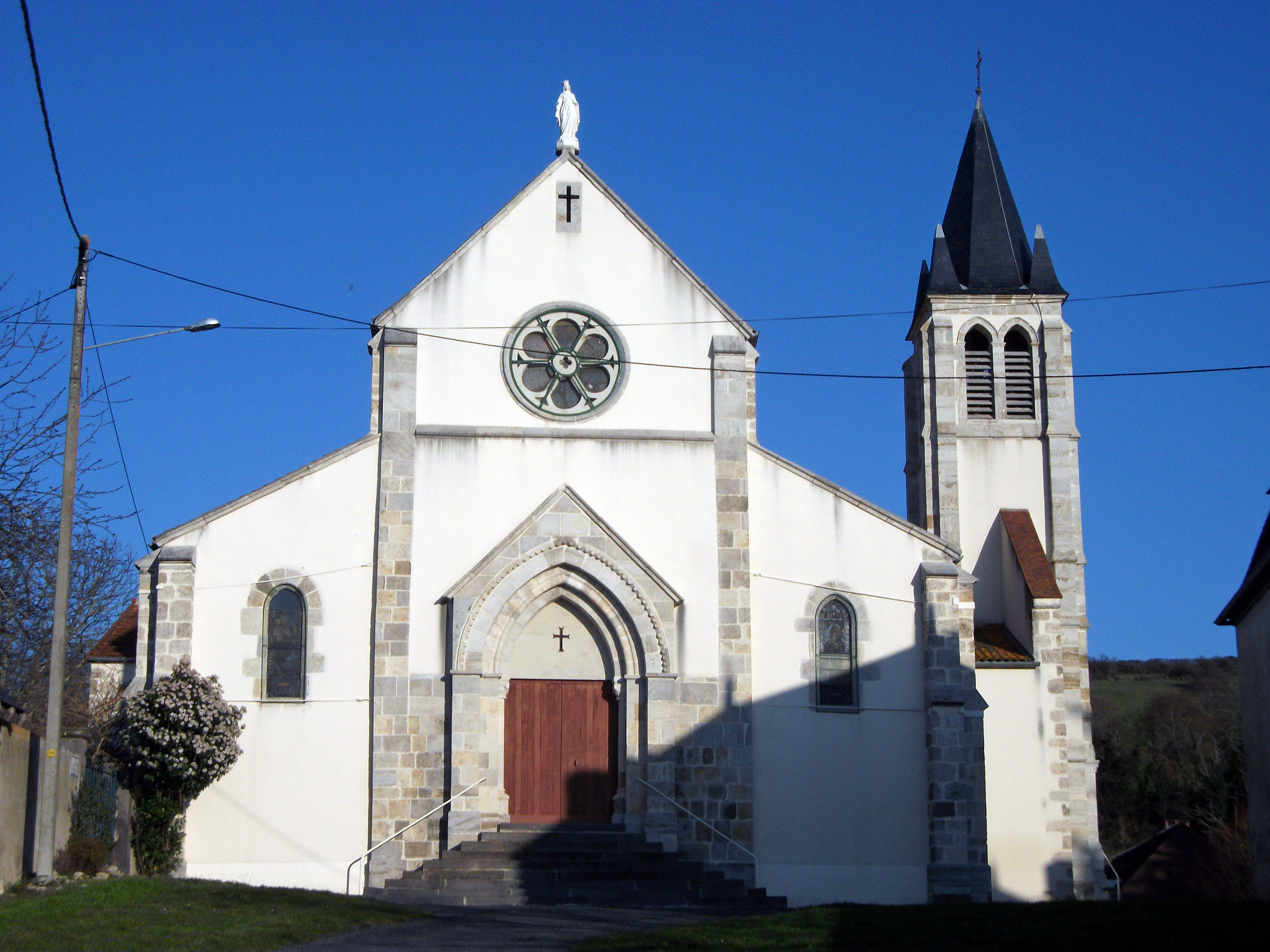
- The church

- Coat of arms
- Location of Ussel-d'Allier
- Location within France Location within Auvergne-Rhône-Alpes
- Coordinates: 46°12′30″N 3°11′26″E
- Country: France
- Region: Auvergne-Rhône-Alpes
- Department: Allier
- Arrondissement: Vichy
- Canton: Gannat
- Intercommunality: Saint-Pourçain Sioule Limagne

Government
  - Mayor (2026–32): Marcel Soccol
- Area^{1}: 1.22 km^{2} (0.47 sq mi)
- Elevation: 287 m (942 ft)
- Highest elevation: 309 m (1,014 ft)
- Lowest elevation: 292 m (958 ft)
- Population (2023): 166
  - Density: 136/km^{2} (352/sq mi)
- Time zone: UTC+01:00 (CET)
  - Summer (DST): UTC+02:00 (CEST)
- INSEE/Postal code: 03294 /03140
- ^{1} French Land Register data, which excludes lakes, ponds, glaciers > 1 km^{2} (0.386 sq mi or 247 acres) and river estuaries.

Ussel-d'Allier (French pronunciation: [ysɛl dalje]) is a commune in the Allier department in Auvergne-Rhône-Alpes in central France.

== Population ==
Historical population
Year	Pop.	±% p.a.
1968	184	—
1975	164	−1.63%
1982	163	−0.09%
1990	147	−1.28%
1999	146	−0.08%
2007	150	+0.34%
2012	150	+0.00%
2017	162	+1.55%
2023	166	+0.41%
Source: INSEE

== See also ==
- Communes of the Allier department
