= Canton of Gannat =

Coordinates: 46.1006°N 3.1992°E

Gannat
- Canton
- Interactive map of Gannat
- Country: France
- Region: Auvergne-Rhône-Alpes
- Department: Allier
- No. of communes: {{{nbcomm}}}
- Population (2023): 19,845
- INSEE code: 03 06

Gannat is a canton of the Allier department, Auvergne-Rhône-Alpes, France. At the French canton reorganisation which came into effect in March 2015, the canton was expanded from 12 to 41 communes:

1. Barberier
2. Bègues
3. Bellenaves
4. Biozat
5. Chantelle
6. Chareil-Cintrat
7. Charmes
8. Charroux
9. Chezelle
10. Chirat-l'Église
11. Chouvigny
12. Coutansouze
13. Deneuille-lès-Chantelle
14. Ébreuil
15. Échassières
16. Étroussat
17. Fleuriel
18. Fourilles
19. Gannat
20. Jenzat
21. Lalizolle
22. Louroux-de-Bouble
23. Le Mayet-d'École
24. Mazerier
25. Monestier
26. Monteignet-sur-l'Andelot
27. Nades
28. Naves
29. Poëzat
30. Saint-Bonnet-de-Rochefort
31. Saint-Germain-de-Salles
32. Saint-Priest-d'Andelot
33. Saulzet
34. Sussat
35. Target
36. Taxat-Senat
37. Ussel-d'Allier
38. Valignat
39. Veauce
40. Vicq
41. Voussac

== See also ==
- Cantons of the Allier department
