= Fleuriel =

- Commune
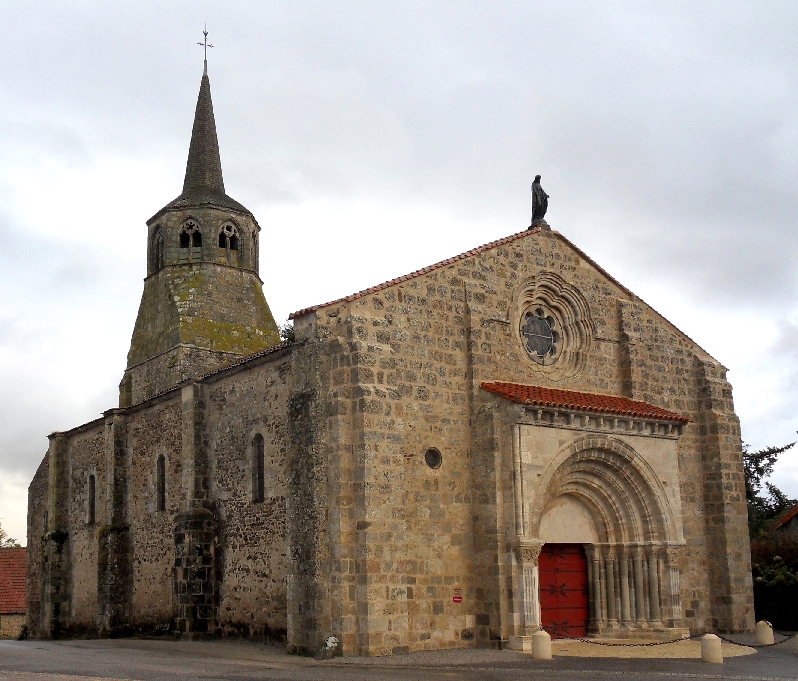
- The church in Fleuriel
- Location of Fleuriel
- Location within France Location within Auvergne-Rhône-Alpes
- Coordinates: 46°16′57″N 3°10′44″E
- Country: France
- Region: Auvergne-Rhône-Alpes
- Department: Allier
- Arrondissement: Vichy
- Canton: Gannat

Government
  - Mayor (2026–32): Pierre Lampaert
- Area^{1}: 28.05 km^{2} (10.83 sq mi)
- Elevation: 430 m (1,410 ft)
- Highest elevation: 446 m (1,463 ft)
- Lowest elevation: 255 m (837 ft)
- Population (2023): 336
  - Density: 12.0/km^{2} (31.0/sq mi)
- Time zone: UTC+01:00 (CET)
  - Summer (DST): UTC+02:00 (CEST)
- INSEE/Postal code: 03115 /03140
- ^{1} French Land Register data, which excludes lakes, ponds, glaciers > 1 km^{2} (0.386 sq mi or 247 acres) and river estuaries.

Fleuriel (French pronunciation: [flœʁjɛl]) is a commune in the Allier department in central France.

== Geography ==
Two parts of its territory are wooded: the forest of Mosières, in the north, and the end of the forest of the Abbaye-Giverzat, in the southwest.

Fleuriel is watered by the Veauvre, a stream that flows into the Bouble. The municipality is crossed by the provincial road 36, which provides access to Montmarault by the RD 46 northwest of the town, or to Chantelle by the RD 986 southeast.

== Population ==
Historical population
| Year | Pop. | ±% p.a. |
|---|---|---|
| 1968 | 429 | — |
| 1975 | 335 | −3.47% |
| 1982 | 330 | −0.21% |
| 1990 | 330 | +0.00% |
| 1999 | 311 | −0.66% |
| 2007 | 364 | +1.99% |
| 2012 | 342 | −1.24% |
| 2017 | 335 | −0.41% |
| 2023 | 336 | +0.05% |
Source: INSEE

== See also ==
- Communes of the Allier department
