= Étroussat =

- Commune
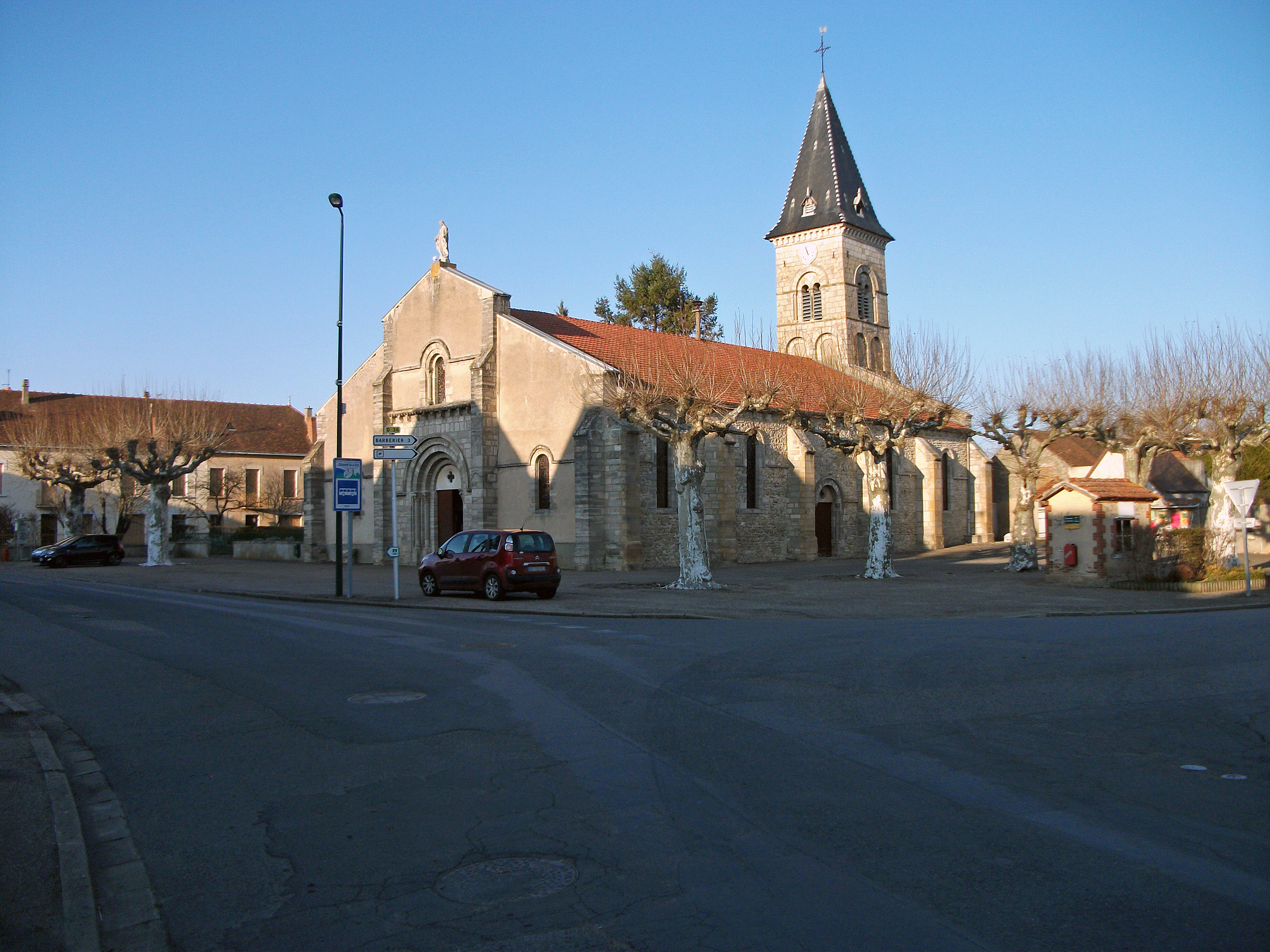
- The church

- Coat of arms
- Location of Étroussat
- Location within France Location within Auvergne-Rhône-Alpes
- Coordinates: 46°13′10″N 3°13′19″E
- Country: France
- Region: Auvergne-Rhône-Alpes
- Department: Allier
- Arrondissement: Vichy
- Canton: Gannat
- Intercommunality: Saint-Pourçain Sioule Limagne

Government
  - Mayor (2026–32): Gilles Vernay
- Area^{1}: 13.03 km^{2} (5.03 sq mi)
- Elevation: 321 m (1,053 ft)
- Highest elevation: 374 m (1,227 ft)
- Lowest elevation: 265 m (869 ft)
- Population (2023): 649
  - Density: 49.8/km^{2} (129/sq mi)
- Time zone: UTC+01:00 (CET)
  - Summer (DST): UTC+02:00 (CEST)
- INSEE/Postal code: 03112 /03140
- ^{1} French Land Register data, which excludes lakes, ponds, glaciers > 1 km^{2} (0.386 sq mi or 247 acres) and river estuaries.

Étroussat (French pronunciation: [etʁusa]; Occitan: Estroçat) is a commune in the Allier department in central France.

== Population ==
Historical population
Year	Pop.	±% p.a.
1968	705	—
1975	672	−0.68%
1982	624	−1.05%
1990	647	+0.45%
1999	605	−0.74%
2007	690	+1.66%
2012	691	+0.03%
2017	655	−1.06%
2023	649	−0.15%
Source: INSEE

== See also ==
- Communes of the Allier department
