= Chezelle =

- Commune
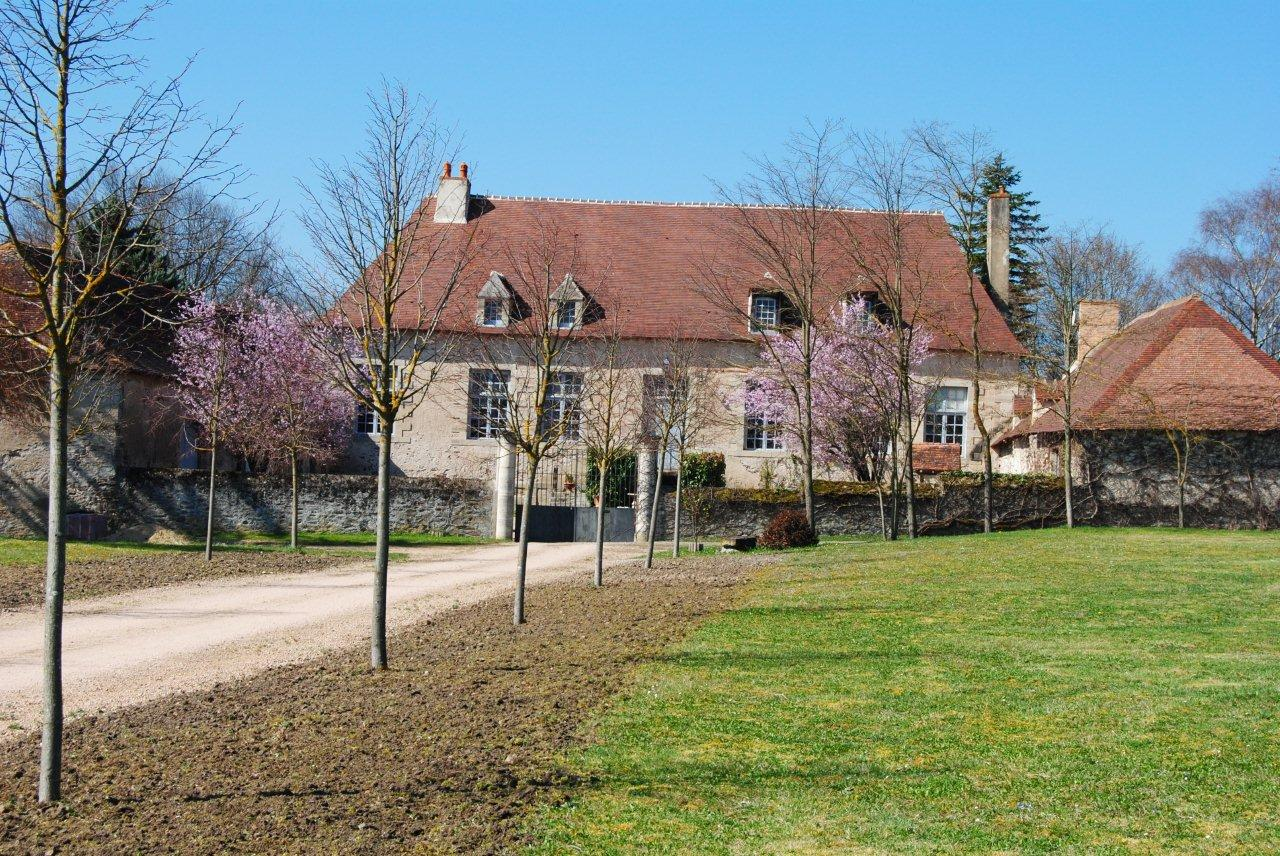
- Chateau Montchoisy

- Coat of arms
- Location of Chezelle
- Location within France Location within Auvergne-Rhône-Alpes
- Coordinates: 46°13′08″N 3°07′27″E
- Country: France
- Region: Auvergne-Rhône-Alpes
- Department: Allier
- Arrondissement: Vichy
- Canton: Gannat
- Intercommunality: Saint-Pourçain Sioule Limagne

Government
  - Mayor (2026–32): Isabelle Mathurin
- Area^{1}: 7.33 km^{2} (2.83 sq mi)
- Elevation: 289 m (948 ft)
- Highest elevation: 344 m (1,129 ft)
- Lowest elevation: 287 m (942 ft)
- Population (2023): 158
  - Density: 21.6/km^{2} (55.8/sq mi)
- Time zone: UTC+01:00 (CET)
  - Summer (DST): UTC+02:00 (CEST)
- INSEE/Postal code: 03075 /03140
- ^{1} French Land Register data, which excludes lakes, ponds, glaciers > 1 km^{2} (0.386 sq mi or 247 acres) and river estuaries.

Chezelle (French pronunciation: [ʃəzɛl]; Occitan: Chasèla) is a commune in the Allier department in central France.

== Population ==
Historical population
Year	Pop.	±% p.a.
1968	163	—
1975	148	−1.37%
1982	109	−4.28%
1990	122	+1.42%
1999	142	+1.70%
2007	160	+1.50%
2012	185	+2.95%
2017	175	−1.11%
2023	158	−1.69%
Source: INSEE

== See also ==
- Communes of the Allier department
