= Ébreuil =

- Commune
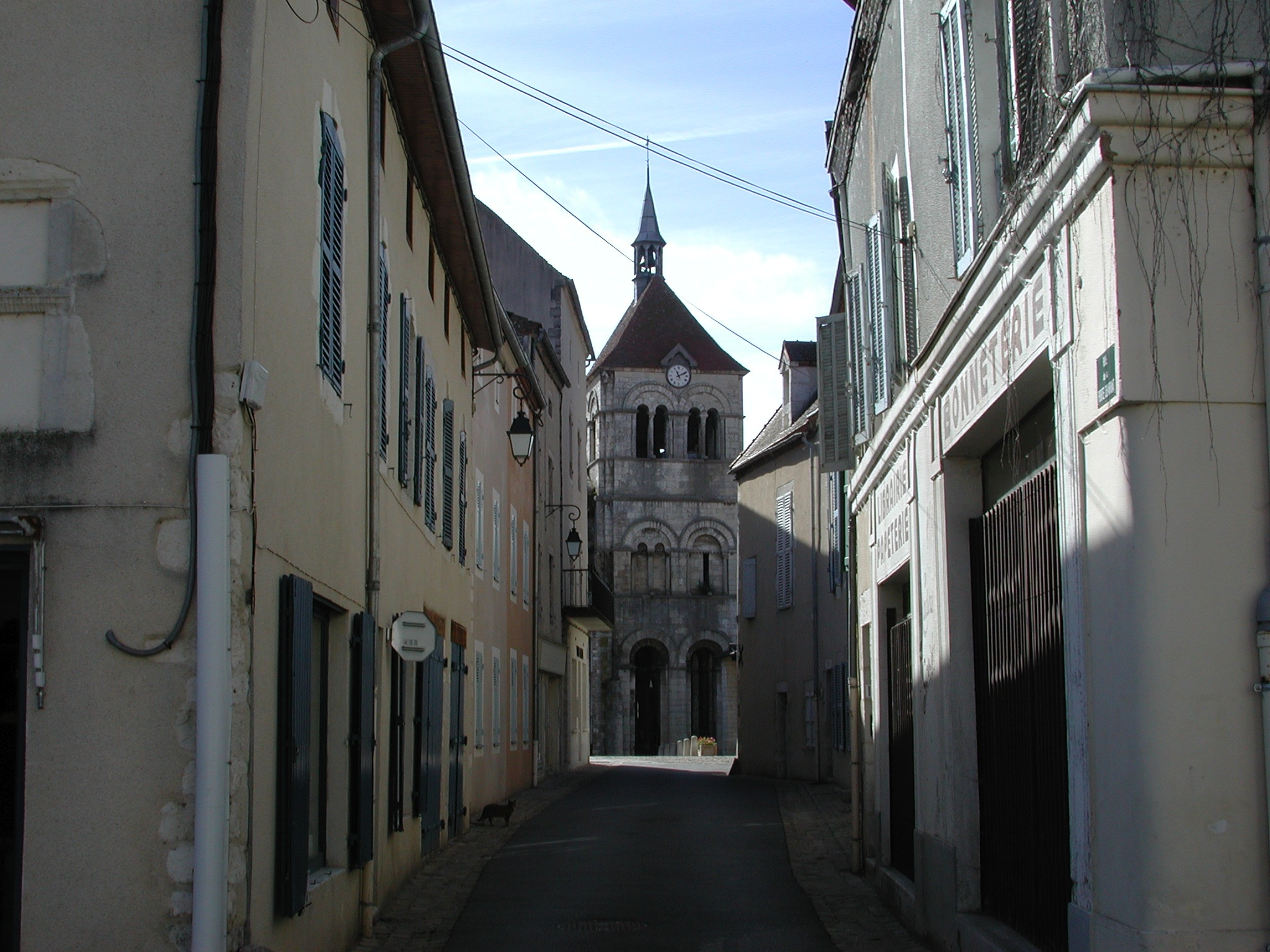
- The tower of the church in Ébreuil

- Coat of arms
- Location of Ébreuil
- Location within France Location within Auvergne-Rhône-Alpes
- Coordinates: 46°06′59″N 3°05′15″E
- Country: France
- Region: Auvergne-Rhône-Alpes
- Department: Allier
- Arrondissement: Vichy
- Canton: Gannat
- Intercommunality: Saint-Pourçain Sioule Limagne

Government
  - Mayor (2026–32): Stéphane Coppin
- Area^{1}: 23.22 km^{2} (8.97 sq mi)
- Elevation: 317 m (1,040 ft)
- Highest elevation: 545 m (1,788 ft)
- Lowest elevation: 301 m (988 ft)
- Population (2023): 1,306
  - Density: 56.24/km^{2} (145.7/sq mi)
- Time zone: UTC+01:00 (CET)
  - Summer (DST): UTC+02:00 (CEST)
- INSEE/Postal code: 03107 /03450
- ^{1} French Land Register data, which excludes lakes, ponds, glaciers > 1 km^{2} (0.386 sq mi or 247 acres) and river estuaries.

Ébreuil (French pronunciation: [ebʁœj]; Auvergnat: Esbreule) is a commune in the Allier department in central France.

== Population ==
Historical population
| Year | Pop. | ±% p.a. |
|---|---|---|
| 1968 | 1,347 | — |
| 1975 | 1,311 | −0.39% |
| 1982 | 1,222 | −1.00% |
| 1990 | 1,148 | −0.78% |
| 1999 | 1,230 | +0.77% |
| 2007 | 1,265 | +0.35% |
| 2012 | 1,274 | +0.14% |
| 2017 | 1,265 | −0.14% |
| 2023 | 1,306 | +0.53% |
Source: INSEE

== See also ==
- Communes of the Allier department
