= Charroux, Allier =

Charroux
- Commune
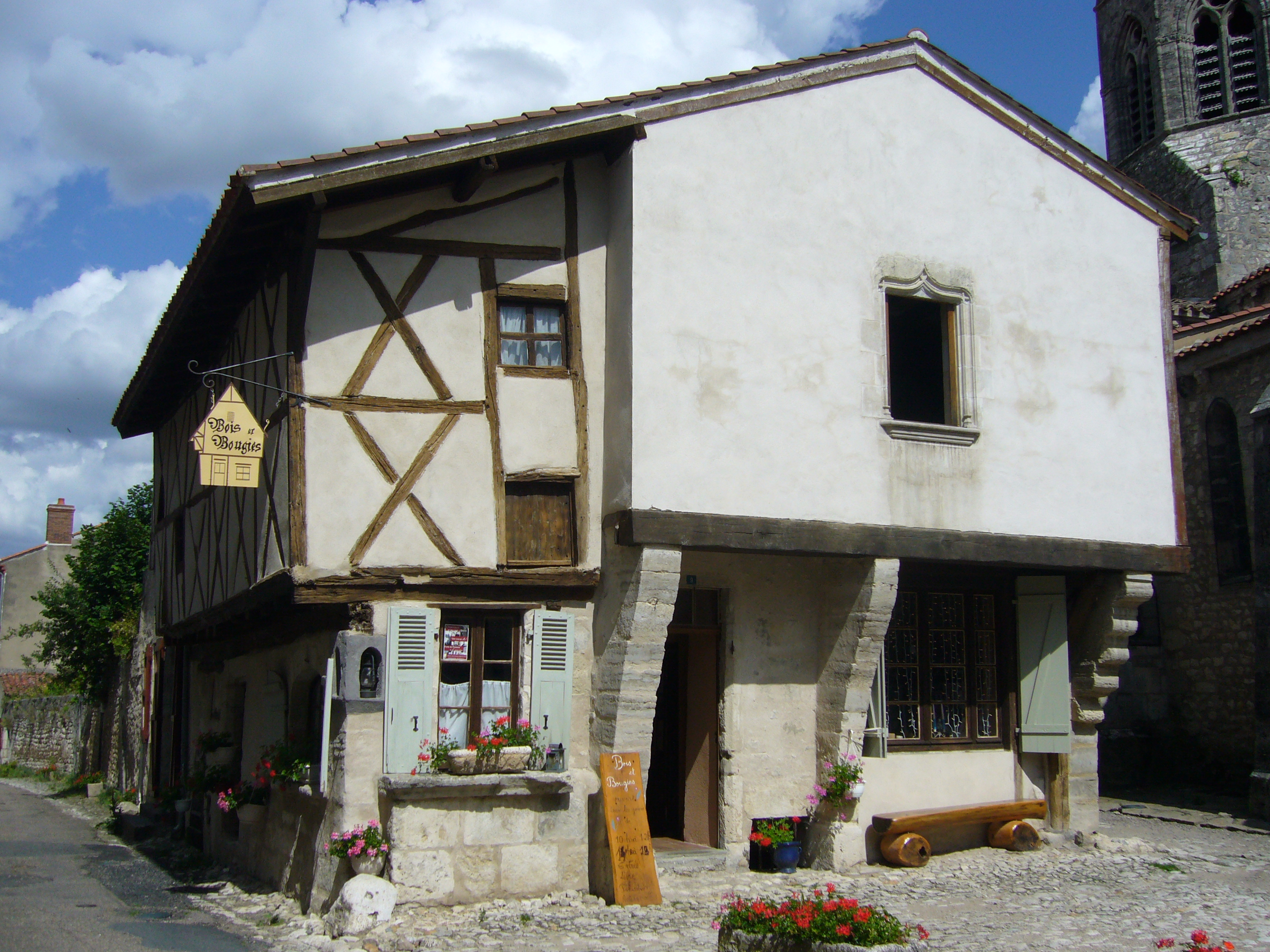
- A half-timbered house in Charroux

- Coat of arms
- Location of Charroux
- Location within France Location within Auvergne-Rhône-Alpes
- Coordinates: 46°11′09″N 3°09′43″E
- Country: France
- Region: Auvergne-Rhône-Alpes
- Department: Allier
- Arrondissement: Vichy
- Canton: Gannat
- Intercommunality: Saint-Pourçain Sioule Limagne

Government
  - Mayor (2026–32): Jacques Gilibert
- Area^{1}: 10.43 km^{2} (4.03 sq mi)
- Elevation: 416 m (1,365 ft)
- Highest elevation: 426 m (1,398 ft)
- Lowest elevation: 291 m (955 ft)
- Population (2023): 335
  - Density: 32.1/km^{2} (83.2/sq mi)
- Time zone: UTC+01:00 (CET)
  - Summer (DST): UTC+02:00 (CEST)
- INSEE/Postal code: 03062 /03140
- ^{1} French Land Register data, which excludes lakes, ponds, glaciers > 1 km^{2} (0.386 sq mi or 247 acres) and river estuaries.

Charroux (French pronunciation: [ʃaʁu]; Occitan: Charós) is a small village situated in the countryside to the south of the Allier department in central France. It is a member of Les Plus Beaux Villages de France (The Most Beautiful Villages of France) Association.

== Population ==
Historical population
| Year | Pop. | ±% p.a. |
|---|---|---|
| 1968 | 427 | — |
| 1975 | 387 | −1.40% |
| 1982 | 352 | −1.35% |
| 1990 | 324 | −1.03% |
| 1999 | 330 | +0.20% |
| 2007 | 383 | +1.88% |
| 2012 | 388 | +0.26% |
| 2017 | 362 | −1.38% |
| 2023 | 335 | −1.28% |
Source: INSEE

== See also ==
- Communes of the Allier department
