= Canton of Le Donjon =

Coordinates: 46.3514°N 3.7936°E

Le Donjon
- Former canton
- Interactive map of Le Donjon
- Country: France
- Region: Auvergne-Rhône-Alpes
- Department: Allier
- No. of communes: {{{nbcomm}}}
- Disbanded: 2015
- Population (2012): 4,920

Le Donjon is a former canton of the Allier department, Auvergne, France. It was disbanded following the French canton reorganisation which came into effect in March 2015. It consisted of 13 communes, which joined the canton of Dompierre-sur-Besbre in 2015. It had 4,920 inhabitants (2012).

== Communes ==
The canton consisted of the following communes:

- Avrilly
- Le Bouchaud
- Chassenard
- Le Donjon
- Lenax
- Loddes
- Luneau
- Montaiguët-en-Forez
- Montcombroux-les-Mines
- Neuilly-en-Donjon
- Le Pin
- Saint-Didier-en-Donjon
- Saint-Léger-sur-Vouzance

== See also ==
- Cantons of the Allier department
