= Canton of Chevagnes =

Coordinates: 46°36′43″N 3°33′06″E

Chevagnes
- Former canton
- Interactive map of Chevagnes
- Country: France
- Region: Auvergne-Rhône-Alpes
- Department: Allier
- No. of communes: {{{nbcomm}}}
- Disbanded: 2015
- Area: 385.09 km^{2} (148.68 sq mi)
- Population (2012): 7,121
  - Density: 18.49/km^{2} (47.89/sq mi)

The canton of Chevagnes is a former administrative division in central France. It was disbanded following the French canton reorganisation which came into effect in March 2015. It consisted of 10 communes, which joined the canton of Dompierre-sur-Besbre in 2015. It had 7,121 inhabitants (2012).

The canton comprised the following communes:

- Beaulon
- La Chapelle-aux-Chasses
- Chevagnes
- Chézy
- Gannay-sur-Loire
- Garnat-sur-Engièvre
- Lusigny
- Paray-le-Frésil
- Saint-Martin-des-Lais
- Thiel-sur-Acolin

== Demographics ==
Historical population Canton of Chevagnes
Year	1962	1968	1975	1982	1990	1999
Pop.	7,318	7,678	7,558	7,539	7,423	6,743
±%	—	+4.9%	−1.6%	−0.3%	−1.5%	−9.2%
From the year 1962 on: No double counting – residents of multiple communes (e.g. students and military personnel) are counted only once. Source: INSEE

== See also ==
- Cantons of the Allier department
