= Avrilly, Allier =

Avrilly
- Commune
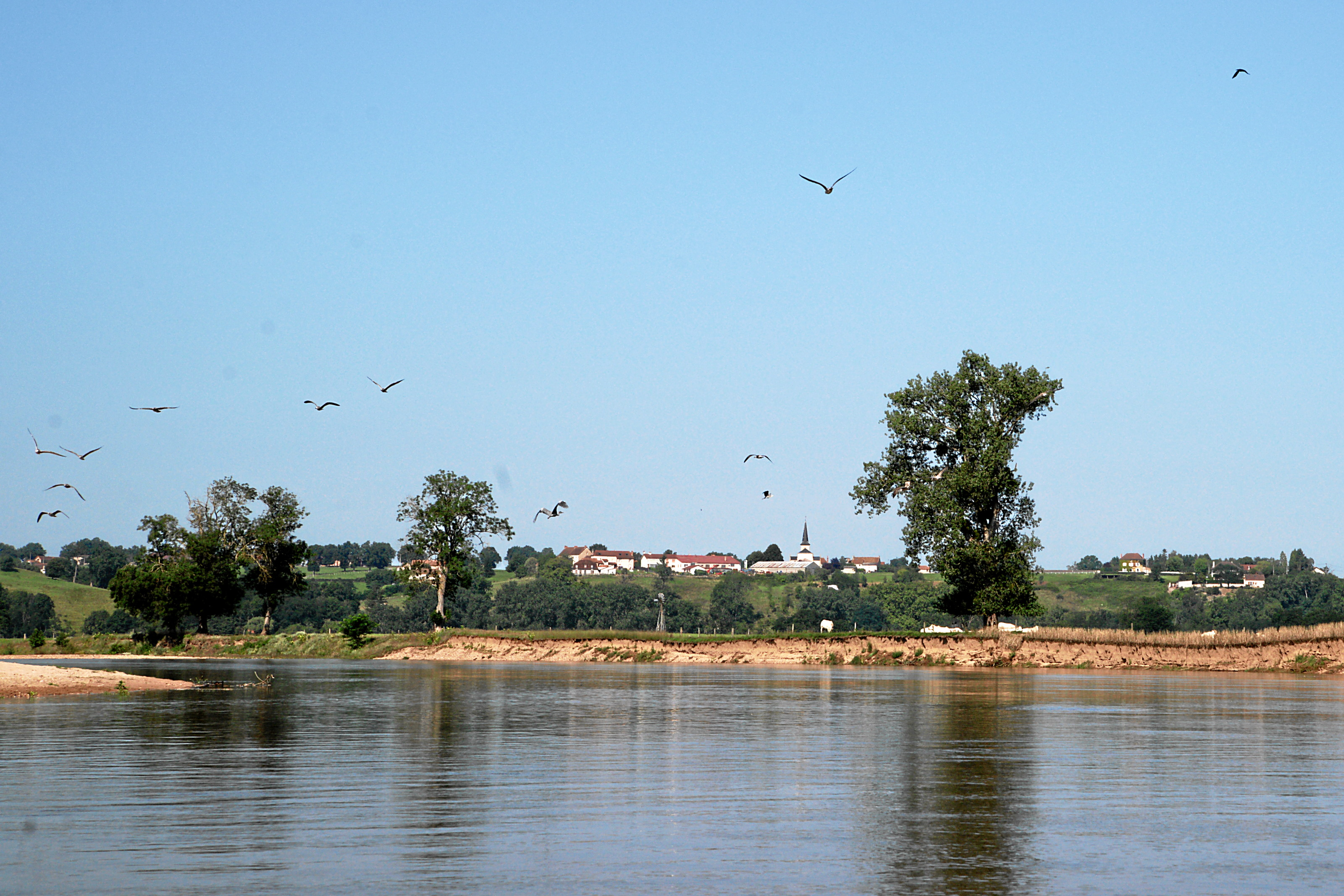
- The Loire at Avrilly
- Location of Avrilly
- Location within France Location within Auvergne-Rhône-Alpes
- Coordinates: 46°20′03″N 3°58′54″E
- Country: France
- Region: Auvergne-Rhône-Alpes
- Department: Allier
- Arrondissement: Vichy
- Canton: Dompierre-sur-Besbre
- Intercommunality: CC Entr'Allier Besbre Loire

Government
  - Mayor (2026–32): Solène Carignant
- Area^{1}: 11.48 km^{2} (4.43 sq mi)
- Elevation: 280 m (920 ft)
- Highest elevation: 312 m (1,024 ft)
- Lowest elevation: 234 m (768 ft)
- Population (2023): 144
  - Density: 12.5/km^{2} (32.5/sq mi)
- Time zone: UTC+01:00 (CET)
  - Summer (DST): UTC+02:00 (CEST)
- INSEE/Postal code: 03014 /03130
- ^{1} French Land Register data, which excludes lakes, ponds, glaciers > 1 km^{2} (0.386 sq mi or 247 acres) and river estuaries.

Avrilly (French pronunciation: [avʁiji]) is a commune of the Allier department in the Auvergne-Rhône-Alpes region of central France.

The inhabitants of the commune are known as Avrillois or Avrilloises.

== Geography ==
Avrilly is located 45 km (28 mi) north-east of Vichy and 10 km (6.2 mi) north-west of Marcigny. The eastern border of the commune is also the departmental border between Allier and Saône-et-Loire. Access to the commune is by road D989 from Neuilly-en-Donjon in the west which passes through the south of the commune and continues to Bourg-le-Comte. The D210 branches from the D169 in the north and passes down the eastern side of the commune through the village and continues south, changing to the D229 at the border, to join the D989 north-west of Bourg-le-Comte. The D265 connects the village to the D989 in the west of the commune. The D212 branches from the D989 in the west of the commune and goes north to Luneau. Apart from the village there are the hamlets of Les Raflots and Les Simonins in the west. There are some small scattered forests in the commune but it is mostly farmland.

The Loire river flows along the eastern border of the commune approximately forming the border as it flows north to join the Atlantic Ocean at Saint-Nazaire. The Canal de Roanne à Digoin also flows inside the eastern border parallel to the Loire. A number of streams rise in the commune and flow east to join the Loire forming many ponds.

== History ==
In a papal bull dated April 1164 Pope Alexander III, from his refugee in France, confirmed the Abbey of Saint-Martin of Autun as patron of the Church of Avrilly. The Church was burned down on 15 August 1592. The monks also owned Rejus, a hamlet in Saint-Martin du Lac between the church and Champceau in the parish of Anzy-le-Duc.

== Administration ==
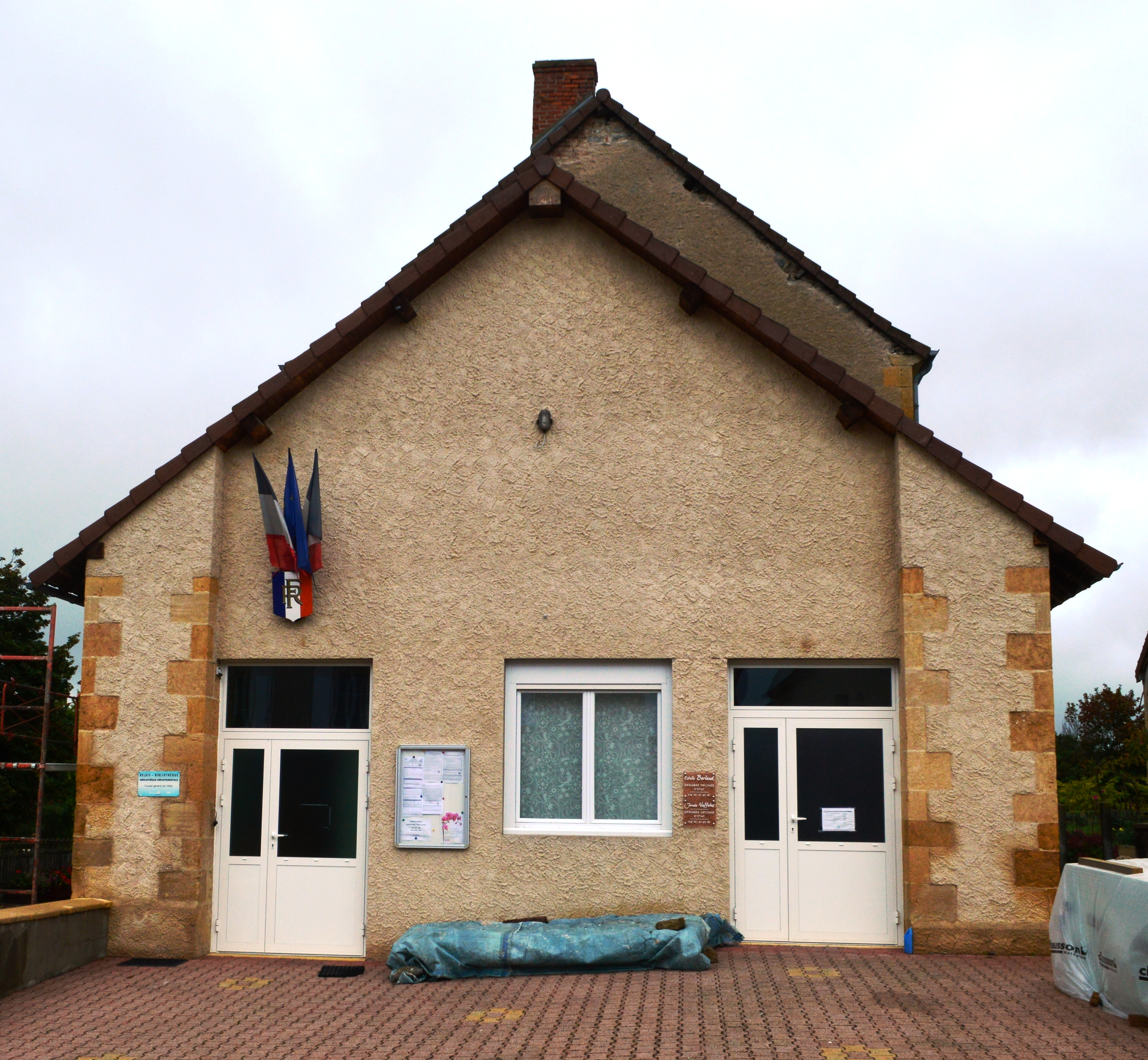
The Town Hall

List of Successive Mayors

From	To	Name
2001	2008	Marie Edith Perreaud
2008	2020	Claudette Delorme
2020	Current	Solène Carignant

== Demography ==
Historical population

Year	Pop.	±% p.a.
1793	492	—
1821	484	−0.06%
1846	458	−0.22%
1872	485	+0.22%
1901	451	−0.25%
1921	367	−1.03%
1936	326	−0.79%
1946	315	−0.34%
1962	330	+0.29%

Year	Pop.	±% p.a.
1968	289	−2.19%
1975	241	−2.56%
1982	193	−3.12%
1990	159	−2.39%
1999	179	+1.33%
2007	165	−1.01%
2012	146	−2.42%
2017	135	−1.55%
2023	144	+1.08%

Source: EHESS and INSEE

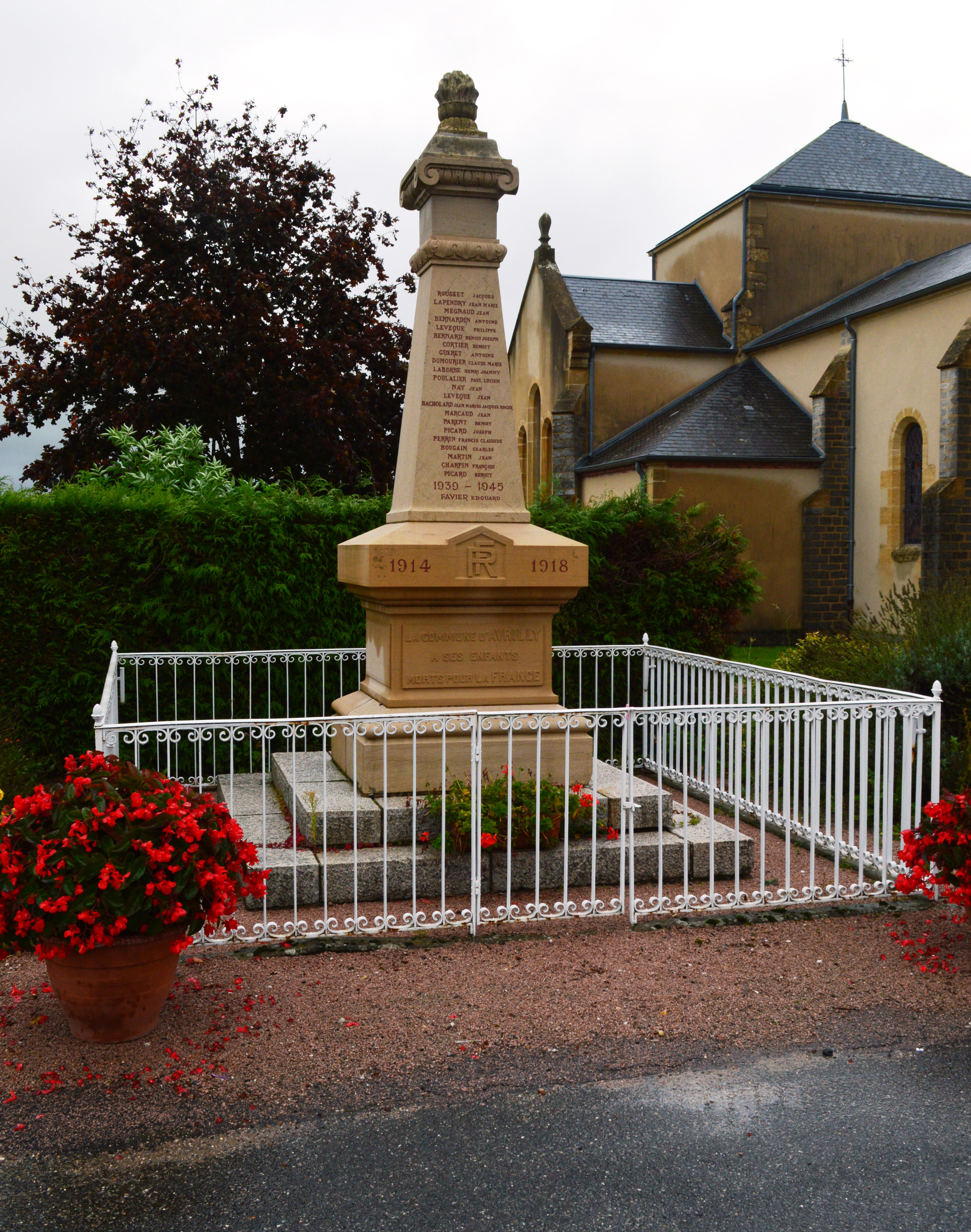
Avrilly War Memorial

== Sites and Monuments ==
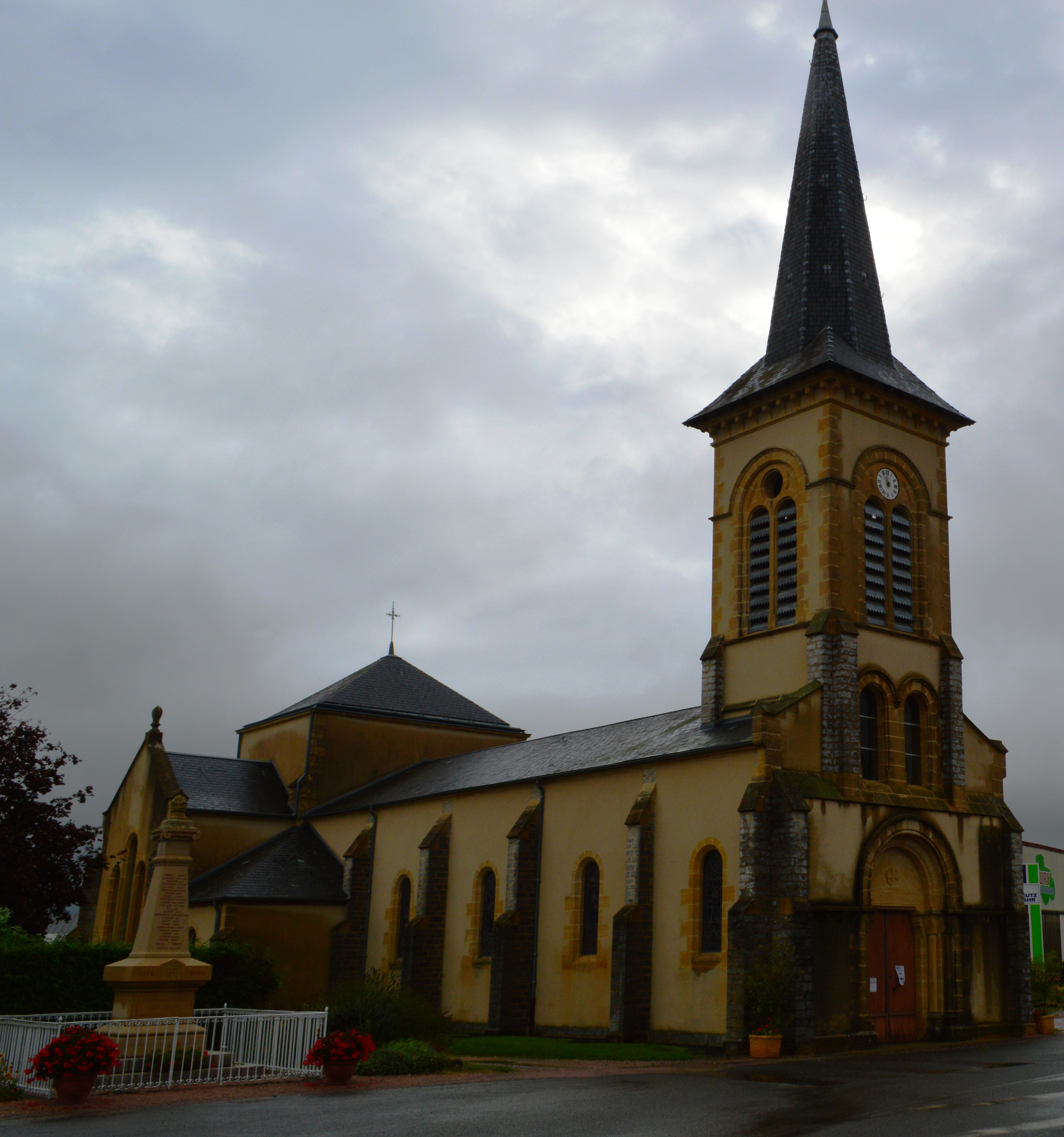
Avrilly Church

The Church contains a Tabernacle (17th century) which is registered as an historical object.

=== Avrilly Picture Gallery ===
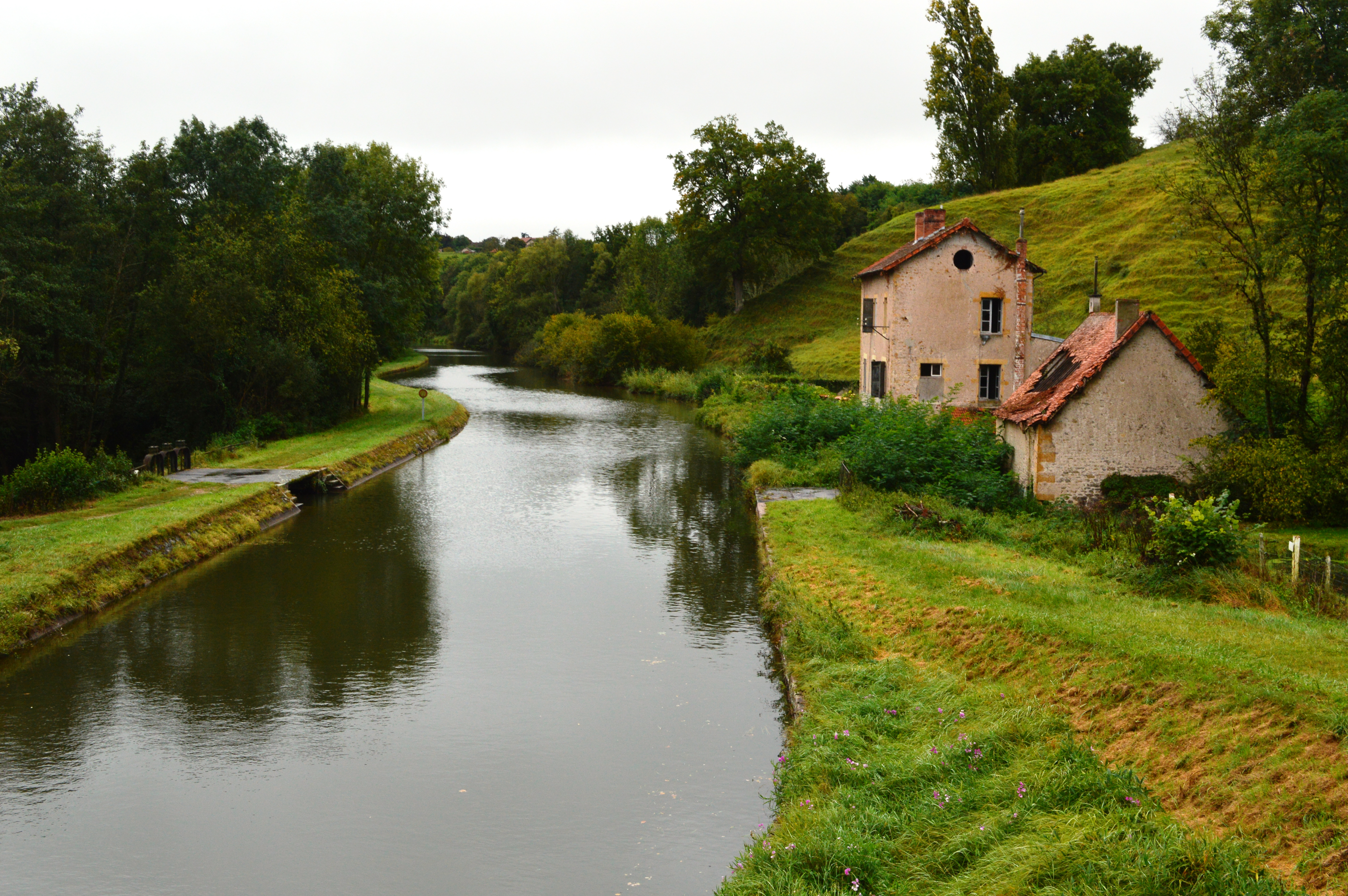
The Canal de Roanne à Digoin at Avrilly

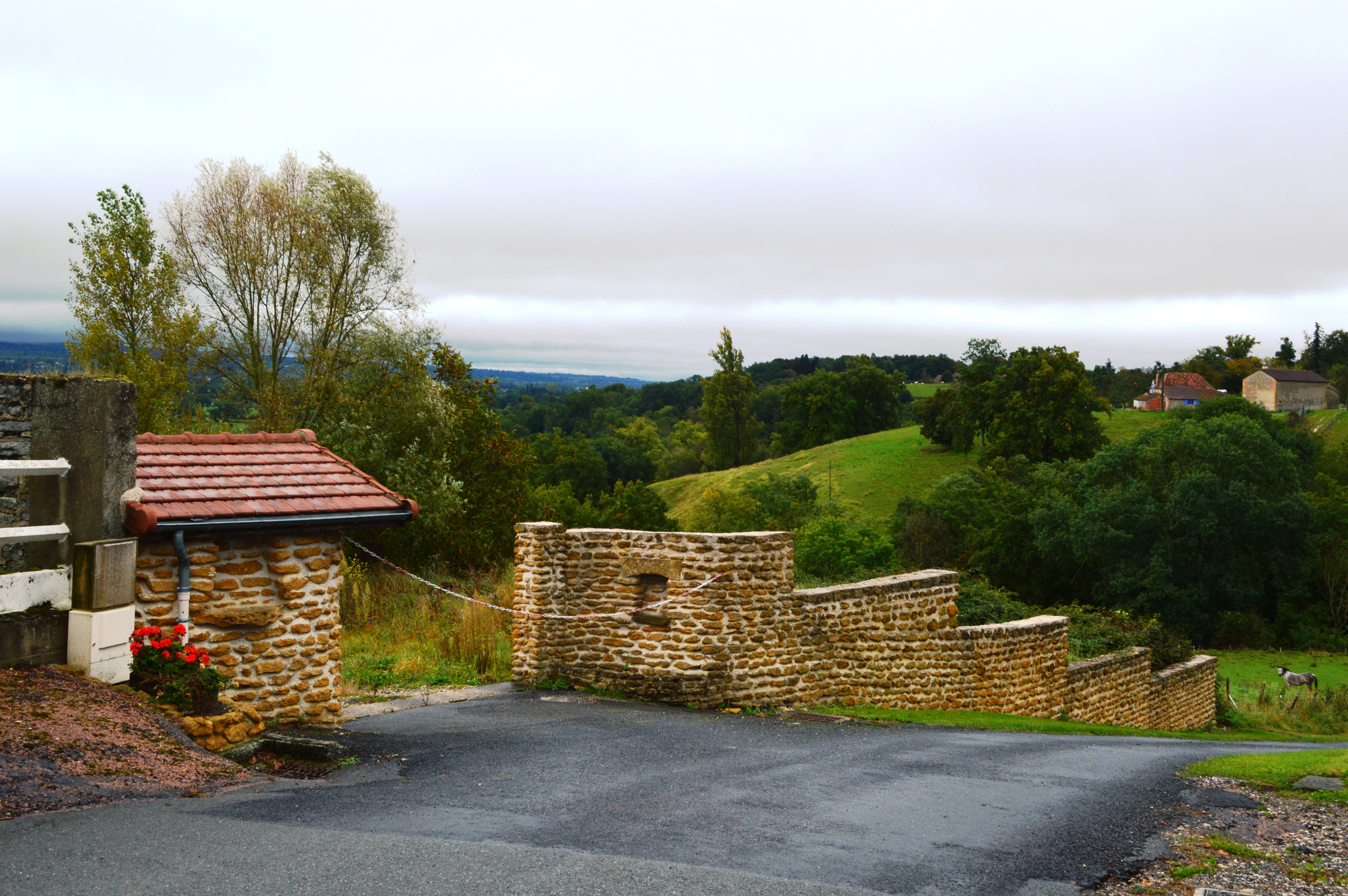
Avrilly Landscape

== See also ==
- Communes of the Allier department
