= Moulins Communauté =

- Communauté d'agglomération
- Interactive map of Moulins Communauté
- Coordinates: 46°34′N 03°20′E
- Country: France
- Region: Auvergne-Rhône-Alpes, Bourgogne-Franche-Comté
- Department: Allier, Nièvre
- No. of communes: {{{nbcomm}}}
- Established: 2017
- Area: 1,336.2 km^{2} (515.9 sq mi)
- Population (2019): 64,458
  - Density: 48.240/km^{2} (124.94/sq mi)
- Website: www.agglo-moulins.fr

Moulins Communauté is the communauté d'agglomération, an intercommunal structure, centred on the town of Moulins. It is located in the Allier and Nièvre departments, in the Auvergne-Rhône-Alpes and Bourgogne-Franche-Comté regions, central France. Created in 2017, its seat is in Moulins. Its area is 1,336.2 km^{2}. Its population was 64,458 in 2019, of which 19,246 in Moulins proper.

== Composition ==
The communauté d'agglomération consists of the following 44 communes, of which two (Dornes and Saint-Parize-en-Viry) in the Nièvre department:

1. Aubigny
2. Aurouër
3. Avermes
4. Bagneux
5. Bessay-sur-Allier
6. Besson
7. Bresnay
8. Bressolles
9. Chapeau
10. La Chapelle-aux-Chasses
11. Château-sur-Allier
12. Chemilly
13. Chevagnes
14. Chézy
15. Coulandon
16. Couzon
17. Dornes
18. Gannay-sur-Loire
19. Garnat-sur-Engièvre
20. Gennetines
21. Gouise
22. Limoise
23. Lurcy-Lévis
24. Lusigny
25. Marigny
26. Montbeugny
27. Montilly
28. Moulins
29. Neuilly-le-Réal
30. Neure
31. Neuvy
32. Paray-le-Frésil
33. Pouzy-Mésangy
34. Saint-Ennemond
35. Saint-Léopardin-d'Augy
36. Saint-Martin-des-Lais
37. Saint-Parize-en-Viry
38. Souvigny
39. Thiel-sur-Acolin
40. Toulon-sur-Allier
41. Trévol
42. Le Veurdre
43. Villeneuve-sur-Allier
44. Yzeure

== See also ==
- List of intercommunalities of the Allier department
