= Vaumas =

- Commune
- Location of Vaumas
- Location within France Location within Auvergne-Rhône-Alpes
- Coordinates: 46°26′49″N 3°37′51″E
- Country: France
- Region: Auvergne-Rhône-Alpes
- Department: Allier
- Arrondissement: Vichy
- Canton: Dompierre-sur-Besbre
- Intercommunality: Entr'Allier Besbre et Loire

Government
  - Mayor (2026–32): Alain Soufférant
- Area^{1}: 34.88 km^{2} (13.47 sq mi)
- Elevation: 236 m (774 ft)
- Highest elevation: 304 m (997 ft)
- Lowest elevation: 227 m (745 ft)
- Population (2023): 528
  - Density: 15.1/km^{2} (39.2/sq mi)
- Time zone: UTC+01:00 (CET)
  - Summer (DST): UTC+02:00 (CEST)
- INSEE/Postal code: 03300 /03220
- ^{1} French Land Register data, which excludes lakes, ponds, glaciers > 1 km^{2} (0.386 sq mi or 247 acres) and river estuaries.

Vaumas is a commune in the Allier department in Auvergne-Rhône-Alpes in central France.

== Population ==
Historical population
Year	Pop.	±% p.a.
1968	727	—
1975	685	−0.85%
1982	627	−1.26%
1990	592	−0.72%
1999	564	−0.54%
2007	540	−0.54%
2012	543	+0.11%
2017	538	−0.18%
2023	528	−0.31%
Source: INSEE

== See also ==
- Communes of the Allier department
