= Molinet =

- Commune
- Location of Molinet
- Location within France Location within Auvergne-Rhône-Alpes
- Coordinates: 46°28′00″N 3°56′12″E
- Country: France
- Region: Auvergne-Rhône-Alpes
- Department: Allier
- Arrondissement: Vichy
- Canton: Dompierre-sur-Besbre
- Intercommunality: Le Grand Charolais

Government
  - Mayor (2026–32): Michel Arnoux
- Area^{1}: 25.98 km^{2} (10.03 sq mi)
- Elevation: 242 m (794 ft)
- Highest elevation: 288 m (945 ft)
- Lowest elevation: 219 m (719 ft)
- Population (2023): 1,104
  - Density: 42.49/km^{2} (110.1/sq mi)
- Time zone: UTC+01:00 (CET)
  - Summer (DST): UTC+02:00 (CEST)
- INSEE/Postal code: 03173 /03510
- ^{1} French Land Register data, which excludes lakes, ponds, glaciers > 1 km^{2} (0.386 sq mi or 247 acres) and river estuaries.

Molinet (French pronunciation: [mɔlinɛ]) is a commune in the Allier department in central France.

== Population ==
Historical population
Year	Pop.	±% p.a.
1968	1,090	—
1975	1,179	+1.13%
1982	1,147	−0.39%
1990	1,264	+1.22%
1999	1,159	−0.96%
2007	1,174	+0.16%
2012	1,169	−0.09%
2017	1,150	−0.33%
2023	1,104	−0.68%
Source: INSEE

== See also ==
- Communes of the Allier department
