= Monétay-sur-Loire =

- Commune
- Location of Monétay-sur-Loire
- Location within France Location within Auvergne-Rhône-Alpes
- Coordinates: 46°25′53″N 3°49′03″E
- Country: France
- Region: Auvergne-Rhône-Alpes
- Department: Allier
- Arrondissement: Vichy
- Canton: Dompierre-sur-Besbre
- Intercommunality: Entr'Allier Besbre et Loire

Government
  - Mayor (2026–32): Yves Plouhinec
- Area^{1}: 31.26 km^{2} (12.07 sq mi)
- Elevation: 250 m (820 ft)
- Highest elevation: 303 m (994 ft)
- Lowest elevation: 232 m (761 ft)
- Population (2023): 250
  - Density: 8.0/km^{2} (21/sq mi)
- Time zone: UTC+01:00 (CET)
  - Summer (DST): UTC+02:00 (CEST)
- INSEE/Postal code: 03177 /03470
- ^{1} French Land Register data, which excludes lakes, ponds, glaciers > 1 km^{2} (0.386 sq mi or 247 acres) and river estuaries.

Monétay-sur-Loire (French pronunciation: [mɔnetɛ syʁ lwaʁ], literally Monétay on Loire) is a commune in the Allier department in central France.

== Population ==
Historical population
Year	Pop.	±% p.a.
1968	555	—
1975	509	−1.23%
1982	438	−2.12%
1990	339	−3.15%
1999	340	+0.03%
2007	297	−1.68%
2012	281	−1.10%
2017	264	−1.24%
2023	250	−0.90%
Source: INSEE

== See also ==
- Communes of the Allier department
