= Diou, Allier =

Diou
- Commune
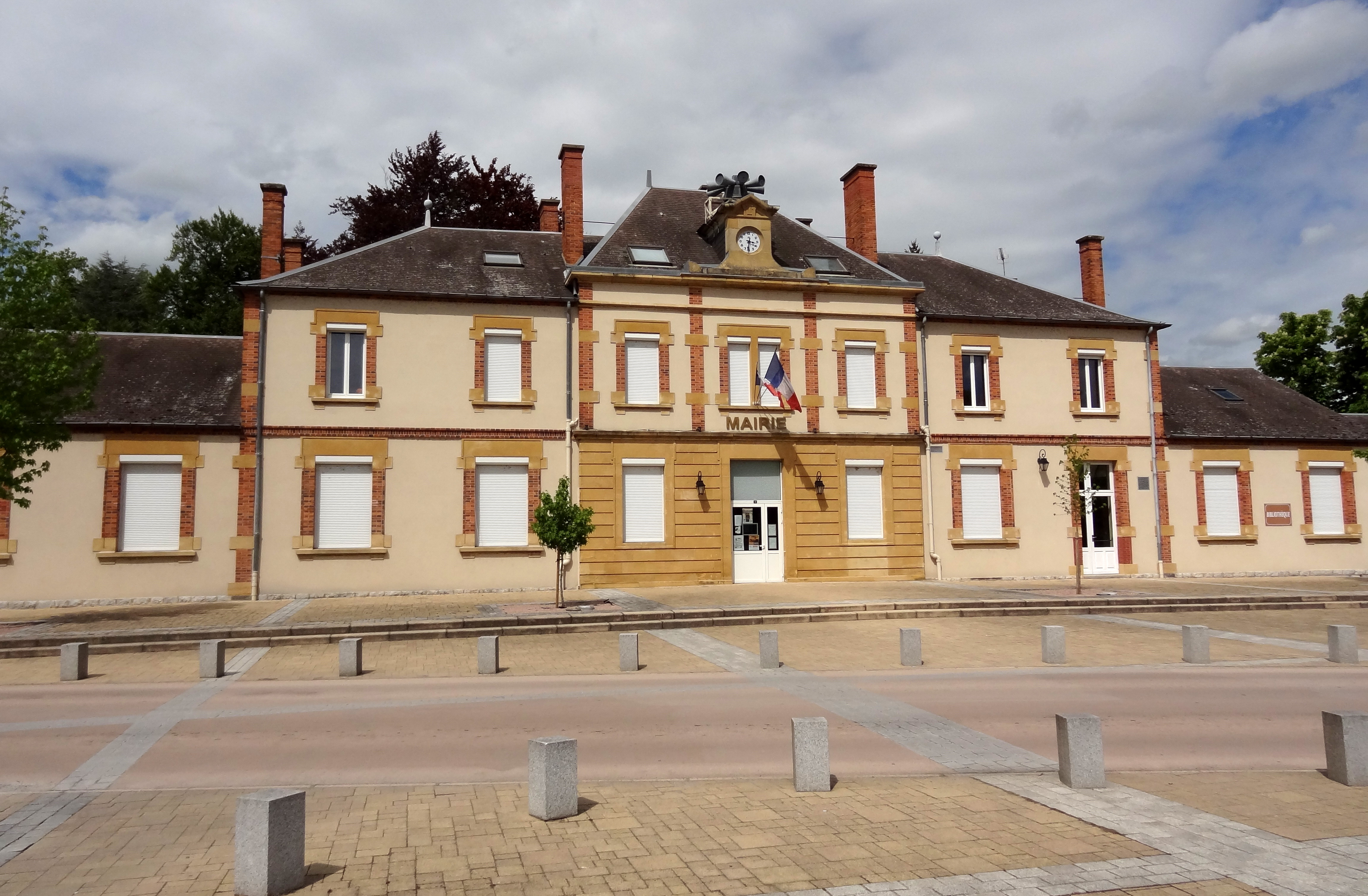
- The town hall in Diou
- Location of Diou
- Location within France Location within Auvergne-Rhône-Alpes
- Coordinates: 46°32′06″N 3°44′43″E
- Country: France
- Region: Auvergne-Rhône-Alpes
- Department: Allier
- Arrondissement: Vichy
- Canton: Dompierre-sur-Besbre

Government
  - Mayor (2026–32): Jean-Jacques Labussiere
- Area^{1}: 24.89 km^{2} (9.61 sq mi)
- Elevation: 219 m (719 ft)
- Highest elevation: 276 m (906 ft)
- Lowest elevation: 207 m (679 ft)
- Population (2023): 1,343
  - Density: 53.96/km^{2} (139.7/sq mi)
- Time zone: UTC+01:00 (CET)
  - Summer (DST): UTC+02:00 (CEST)
- INSEE/Postal code: 03100 /03290
- ^{1} French Land Register data, which excludes lakes, ponds, glaciers > 1 km^{2} (0.386 sq mi or 247 acres) and river estuaries.

Diou (French pronunciation: [dju]) is a commune in the Allier department in central France.

== Population ==
Historical population
Year	Pop.	±% p.a.
1968	1,602	—
1975	1,649	+0.41%
1982	1,705	+0.48%
1990	1,650	−0.41%
1999	1,553	−0.67%
2007	1,514	−0.32%
2012	1,495	−0.25%
2017	1,398	−1.33%
2023	1,343	−0.67%
Source: INSEE

== Climate ==
On average, Diou experiences 4.7 days per year with a minimum temperature below 0 °C (32.0 °F), 1.0 days per year with a minimum temperature below −10 °C (14.0 °F), 4.7 days per year with a maximum temperature below 0 °C (32.0 °F), and 26.2 days per year with a maximum temperature above 30 °C (86.0 °F). The record high temperature was 42.0 °C (107.6 °F) on 27 June 2026, while the record low temperature was −22.0 °C (−7.6 °F) on 16 January 1985.

Climate data for Diou (1991–2020 normals, extremes 1967–present)
Month	Jan	Feb	Mar	Apr	May	Jun	Jul	Aug	Sep	Oct	Nov	Dec	Year
Record high °C (°F)	18.0 (64.4)	22.0 (71.6)	26.1 (79.0)	29.8 (85.6)	34.4 (93.9)	42.0 (107.6)	41.0 (105.8)	41.0 (105.8)	35.3 (95.5)	30.3 (86.5)	24.0 (75.2)	18.9 (66.0)	42.0 (107.6)
Mean daily maximum °C (°F)	7.2 (45.0)	9.0 (48.2)	13.5 (56.3)	16.9 (62.4)	20.8 (69.4)	24.8 (76.6)	27.2 (81.0)	27.1 (80.8)	22.5 (72.5)	17.3 (63.1)	11.1 (52.0)	7.6 (45.7)	17.1 (62.8)
Daily mean °C (°F)	4.1 (39.4)	4.9 (40.8)	8.3 (46.9)	11.2 (52.2)	15.1 (59.2)	18.9 (66.0)	20.9 (69.6)	20.8 (69.4)	16.6 (61.9)	12.7 (54.9)	7.6 (45.7)	4.6 (40.3)	12.1 (53.9)
Mean daily minimum °C (°F)	0.9 (33.6)	0.8 (33.4)	3.1 (37.6)	5.5 (41.9)	9.3 (48.7)	12.9 (55.2)	14.7 (58.5)	14.4 (57.9)	10.8 (51.4)	8.2 (46.8)	4.1 (39.4)	1.5 (34.7)	7.2 (44.9)
Record low °C (°F)	−22.0 (−7.6)	−13.9 (7.0)	−12.0 (10.4)	−5.0 (23.0)	−1.8 (28.8)	2.5 (36.5)	4.2 (39.6)	3.0 (37.4)	−0.1 (31.8)	−6.5 (20.3)	−9.5 (14.9)	−15.0 (5.0)	−22.0 (−7.6)
Average precipitation mm (inches)	64.4 (2.54)	52.5 (2.07)	51.9 (2.04)	68.4 (2.69)	83.6 (3.29)	68.5 (2.70)	64.6 (2.54)	67.7 (2.67)	65.8 (2.59)	78.1 (3.07)	84.4 (3.32)	69.0 (2.72)	818.9 (32.24)
Average precipitation days (≥ 1.0 mm)	12.8	10.7	9.9	10.6	11.1	8.7	8.1	7.5	8.6	11.5	12.8	13.1	125.4
Source: Meteociel

== See also ==
- Communes of the Allier department
