= Pierrefitte-sur-Loire =

- Commune
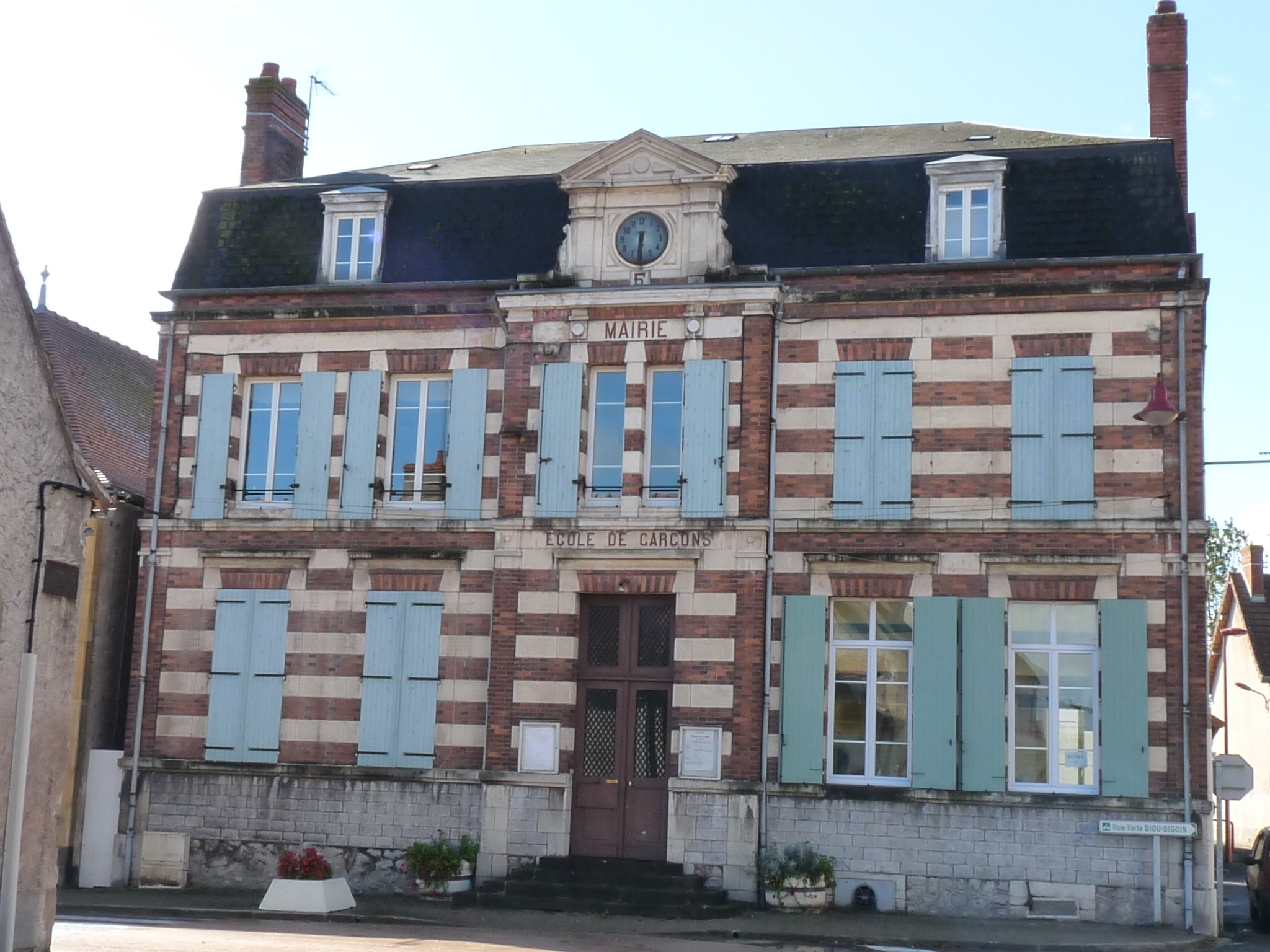
- The town hall in Pierrefitte
- Location of Pierrefitte-sur-Loire
- Location within France Location within Auvergne-Rhône-Alpes
- Coordinates: 46°30′26″N 3°49′01″E
- Country: France
- Region: Auvergne-Rhône-Alpes
- Department: Allier
- Arrondissement: Vichy
- Canton: Dompierre-sur-Besbre
- Intercommunality: Entr'Allier Besbre et Loire

Government
  - Mayor (2026–32): Françoise Bichard
- Area^{1}: 25.36 km^{2} (9.79 sq mi)
- Elevation: 225 m (738 ft)
- Highest elevation: 267 m (876 ft)
- Lowest elevation: 212 m (696 ft)
- Population (2023): 506
  - Density: 20.0/km^{2} (51.7/sq mi)
- Time zone: UTC+01:00 (CET)
  - Summer (DST): UTC+02:00 (CEST)
- INSEE/Postal code: 03207 /03470
- ^{1} French Land Register data, which excludes lakes, ponds, glaciers > 1 km^{2} (0.386 sq mi or 247 acres) and river estuaries.

Pierrefitte-sur-Loire (French pronunciation: [pjɛʁfit syʁ lwaʁ], literally Pierrefitte on Loire) is a commune in the Allier department in Auvergne in central France.

== Population ==
Historical population
Year	Pop.	±% p.a.
1968	626	—
1975	608	−0.42%
1982	649	+0.94%
1990	609	−0.79%
1999	534	−1.45%
2007	512	−0.52%
2012	508	−0.16%
2017	509	+0.04%
2023	506	−0.10%
Source: INSEE

== See also ==
- Communes of the Allier department
