= Saint-Didier-en-Donjon =

- Commune
- Location of Saint-Didier-en-Donjon
- Location within France Location within Auvergne-Rhône-Alpes
- Coordinates: 46°23′18″N 3°51′34″E
- Country: France
- Region: Auvergne-Rhône-Alpes
- Department: Allier
- Arrondissement: Vichy
- Canton: Dompierre-sur-Besbre

Government
  - Mayor (2026–32): Jérome Lassot
- Area^{1}: 32.92 km^{2} (12.71 sq mi)
- Elevation: 280 m (920 ft)
- Highest elevation: 321 m (1,053 ft)
- Lowest elevation: 250 m (820 ft)
- Population (2023): 245
  - Density: 7.44/km^{2} (19.3/sq mi)
- Time zone: UTC+01:00 (CET)
  - Summer (DST): UTC+02:00 (CEST)
- INSEE/Postal code: 03226 /03130
- ^{1} French Land Register data, which excludes lakes, ponds, glaciers > 1 km^{2} (0.386 sq mi or 247 acres) and river estuaries.

Saint-Didier-en-Donjon (French pronunciation: [sɛ̃ didje ɑ̃ dɔ̃ʒɔ̃]) is a commune located in the Allier department in Auvergne-Rhône-Alpes (central France).

== Population ==
Historical population
| Year | Pop. | ±% p.a. |
|---|---|---|
| 1968 | 503 | — |
| 1975 | 415 | −2.71% |
| 1982 | 373 | −1.51% |
| 1990 | 311 | −2.25% |
| 1999 | 284 | −1.00% |
| 2007 | 270 | −0.63% |
| 2012 | 269 | −0.07% |
| 2017 | 259 | −0.75% |
| 2023 | 245 | −0.92% |
Source: INSEE

== See also ==
- Communes of the Allier department
