= Montcombroux-les-Mines =

- Commune
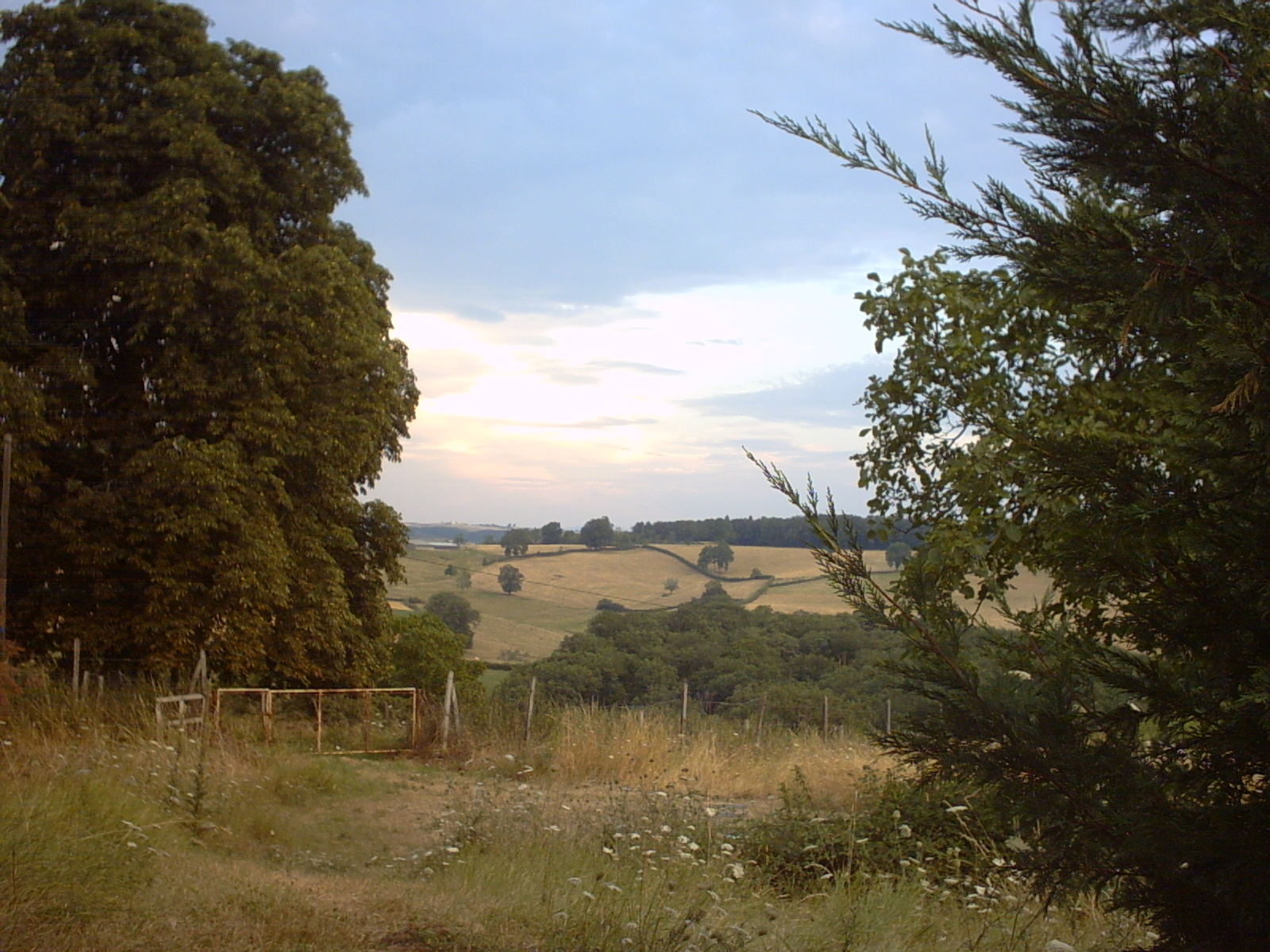
- The landscape of Montcombroux-les-Mines
- Location of Montcombroux-les-Mines
- Location within France Location within Auvergne-Rhône-Alpes
- Coordinates: 46°21′12″N 3°41′28″E
- Country: France
- Region: Auvergne-Rhône-Alpes
- Department: Allier
- Arrondissement: Vichy
- Canton: Dompierre-sur-Besbre

Government
  - Mayor (2026–32): Guillaume Lacroix
- Area^{1}: 23.42 km^{2} (9.04 sq mi)
- Elevation: 392 m (1,286 ft)
- Highest elevation: 414 m (1,358 ft)
- Lowest elevation: 281 m (922 ft)
- Population (2023): 295
  - Density: 12.6/km^{2} (32.6/sq mi)
- Time zone: UTC+01:00 (CET)
  - Summer (DST): UTC+02:00 (CEST)
- INSEE/Postal code: 03181 /03130
- ^{1} French Land Register data, which excludes lakes, ponds, glaciers > 1 km^{2} (0.386 sq mi or 247 acres) and river estuaries.

Montcombroux-les-Mines (French pronunciation: [mɔ̃kɔ̃bʁu le min]) is a commune in the Allier department in central France.

== Population ==
Historical population
Year	Pop.	±% p.a.
1968	645	—
1975	592	−1.22%
1982	512	−2.05%
1990	439	−1.90%
1999	427	−0.31%
2007	414	−0.39%
2012	341	−3.81%
2017	313	−1.70%
2023	295	−0.98%
Source: INSEE

== See also ==
- Communes of the Allier department
