= Lenax =

- Commune
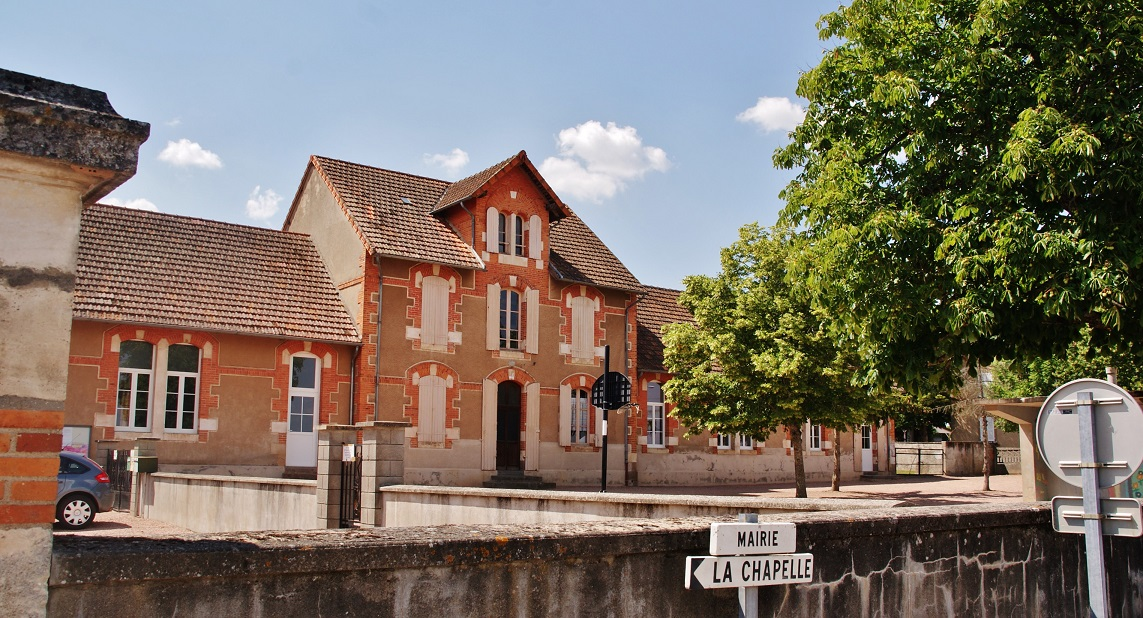
- The town hall in Lenax
- Location of Lenax
- Location within France Location within Auvergne-Rhône-Alpes
- Coordinates: 46°17′57″N 3°49′01″E
- Country: France
- Region: Auvergne-Rhône-Alpes
- Department: Allier
- Arrondissement: Vichy
- Canton: Dompierre-sur-Besbre
- Intercommunality: Entr'Allier Besbre et Loire

Government
  - Mayor (2026–32): Thierry Iwanow
- Area^{1}: 28.25 km^{2} (10.91 sq mi)
- Elevation: 360 m (1,180 ft)
- Highest elevation: 427 m (1,401 ft)
- Lowest elevation: 277 m (909 ft)
- Population (2023): 257
  - Density: 9.10/km^{2} (23.6/sq mi)
- Time zone: UTC+01:00 (CET)
  - Summer (DST): UTC+02:00 (CEST)
- INSEE/Postal code: 03142 /03130
- ^{1} French Land Register data, which excludes lakes, ponds, glaciers > 1 km^{2} (0.386 sq mi or 247 acres) and river estuaries.

Lenax (Arpitan: Lenàx) is a commune in the Allier department in central France.

== Population ==
Historical population
Year	Pop.	±% p.a.
1968	510	—
1975	421	−2.70%
1982	404	−0.59%
1990	360	−1.43%
1999	296	−2.15%
2007	249	−2.14%
2012	257	+0.63%
2017	253	−0.31%
2023	257	+0.26%
Source: INSEE

== See also ==
- Communes of the Allier department
