= Chassenard =

- Commune
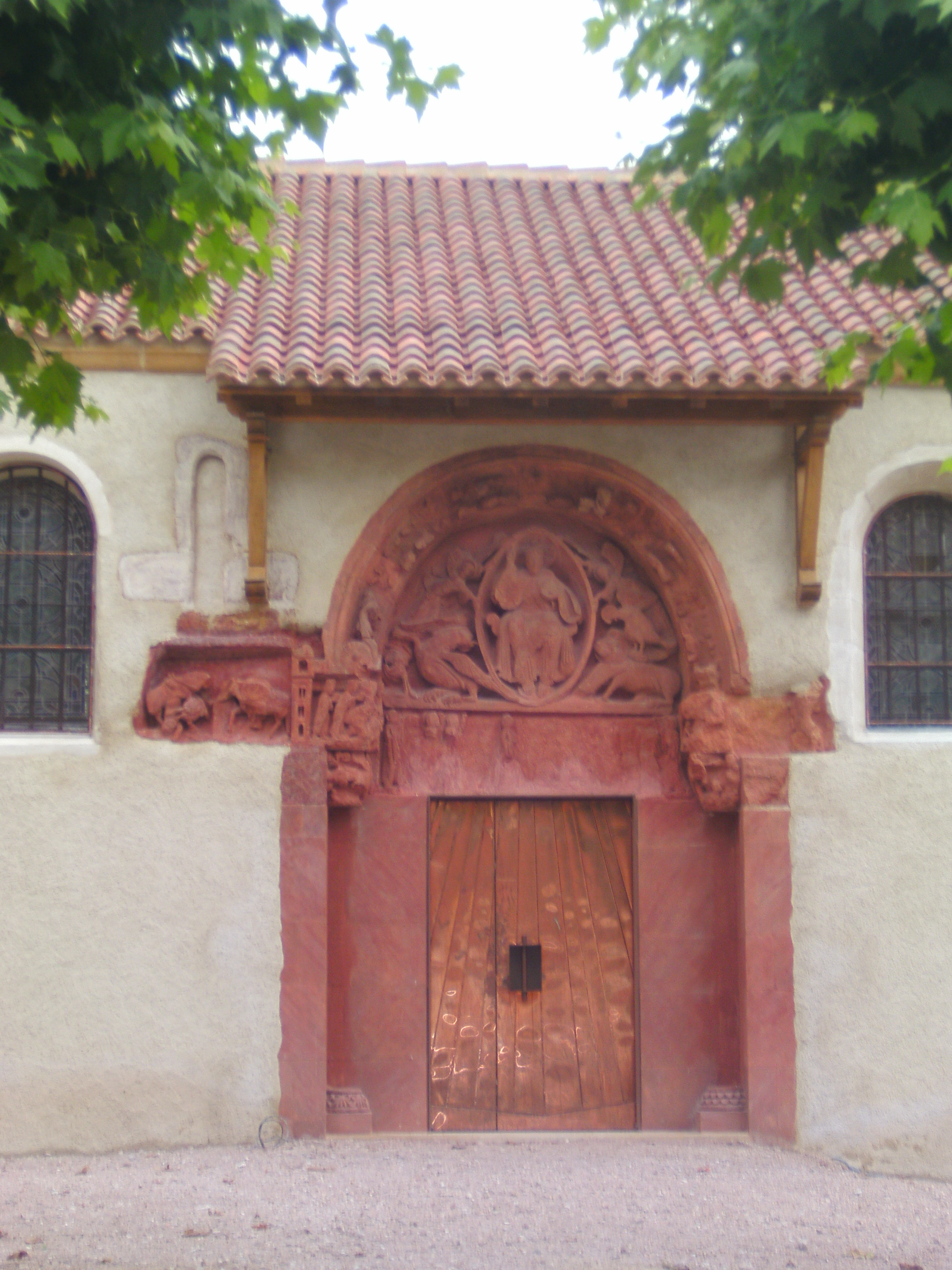
- The church doors in Chassenard
- Location of Chassenard
- Location within France Location within Auvergne-Rhône-Alpes
- Coordinates: 46°26′22″N 3°58′50″E
- Country: France
- Region: Auvergne-Rhône-Alpes
- Department: Allier
- Arrondissement: Vichy
- Canton: Dompierre-sur-Besbre
- Intercommunality: Le Grand Charolais

Government
  - Mayor (2026–32): Fabrice Charles
- Area^{1}: 25.12 km^{2} (9.70 sq mi)
- Elevation: 240 m (790 ft)
- Highest elevation: 281 m (922 ft)
- Lowest elevation: 222 m (728 ft)
- Population (2023): 1,023
  - Density: 40.72/km^{2} (105.5/sq mi)
- Time zone: UTC+01:00 (CET)
  - Summer (DST): UTC+02:00 (CEST)
- INSEE/Postal code: 03063 /03510
- ^{1} French Land Register data, which excludes lakes, ponds, glaciers > 1 km^{2} (0.386 sq mi or 247 acres) and river estuaries.

Chassenard (French pronunciation: [ʃasnaʁ]) is a commune in the Allier department in central France.

== Population ==
Historical population
Year	Pop.	±% p.a.
1968	888	—
1975	855	−0.54%
1982	959	+1.65%
1990	1,017	+0.74%
1999	923	−1.07%
2007	918	−0.07%
2012	966	+1.02%
2017	989	+0.47%
2023	1,023	+0.56%
Source: INSEE

== See also ==
- Communes of the Allier department
