= Montaiguët-en-Forez =

- Commune
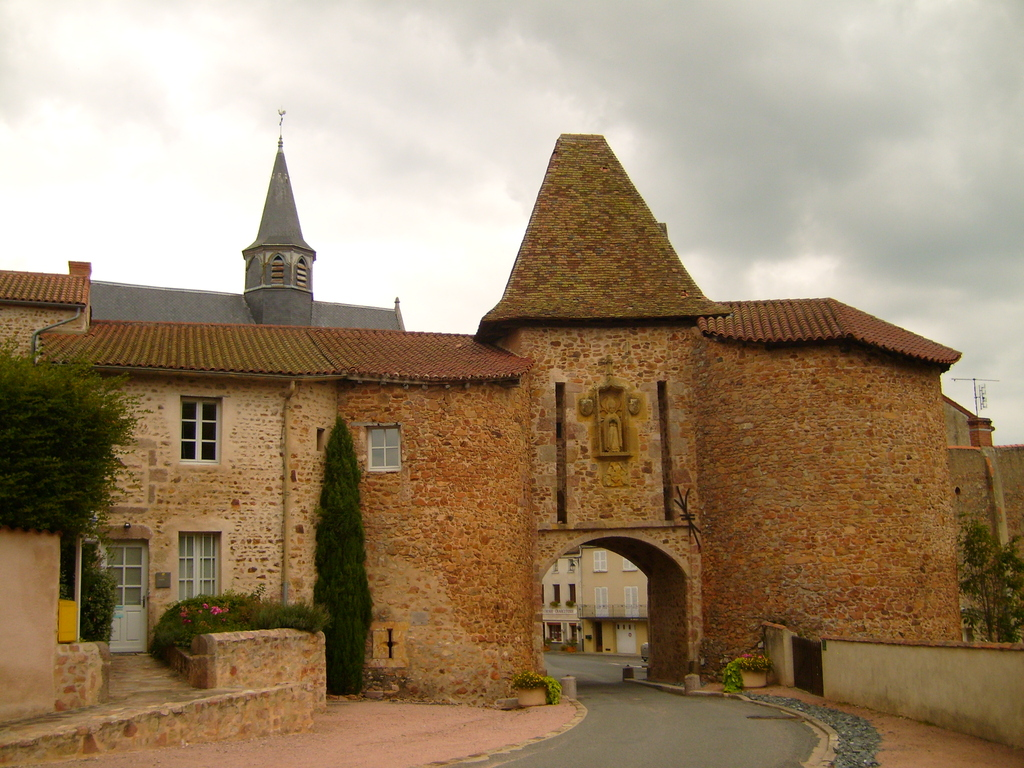
- Town gate

- Coat of arms
- Location of Montaiguët-en-Forez
- Location within France Location within Auvergne-Rhône-Alpes
- Coordinates: 46°16′18″N 3°48′09″E
- Country: France
- Region: Auvergne-Rhône-Alpes
- Department: Allier
- Arrondissement: Vichy
- Canton: Dompierre-sur-Besbre
- Intercommunality: Entr'Allier Besbre et Loire

Government
  - Mayor (2026–32): Hervé Chomet
- Area^{1}: 22.49 km^{2} (8.68 sq mi)
- Elevation: 410 m (1,350 ft)
- Highest elevation: 465 m (1,526 ft)
- Lowest elevation: 276 m (906 ft)
- Population (2023): 280
  - Density: 12/km^{2} (32/sq mi)
- Time zone: UTC+01:00 (CET)
  - Summer (DST): UTC+02:00 (CEST)
- INSEE/Postal code: 03178 /03130
- ^{1} French Land Register data, which excludes lakes, ponds, glaciers > 1 km^{2} (0.386 sq mi or 247 acres) and river estuaries.

Montaiguët-en-Forez (French pronunciation: [mɔ̃tɛɡɥɛ ɑ̃ fɔʁɛ], literally Montaiguët in Forez; Arpitan: Montaiguët) is a commune in the Allier department in central France.

== Population ==
Historical population
Year	Pop.	±% p.a.
1968	564	—
1975	473	−2.48%
1982	404	−2.23%
1990	357	−1.53%
1999	320	−1.21%
2007	307	−0.52%
2012	323	+1.02%
2017	313	−0.63%
2023	280	−1.84%
Source: INSEE

== See also ==
- Communes of the Allier department
