= Loddes =

- Commune
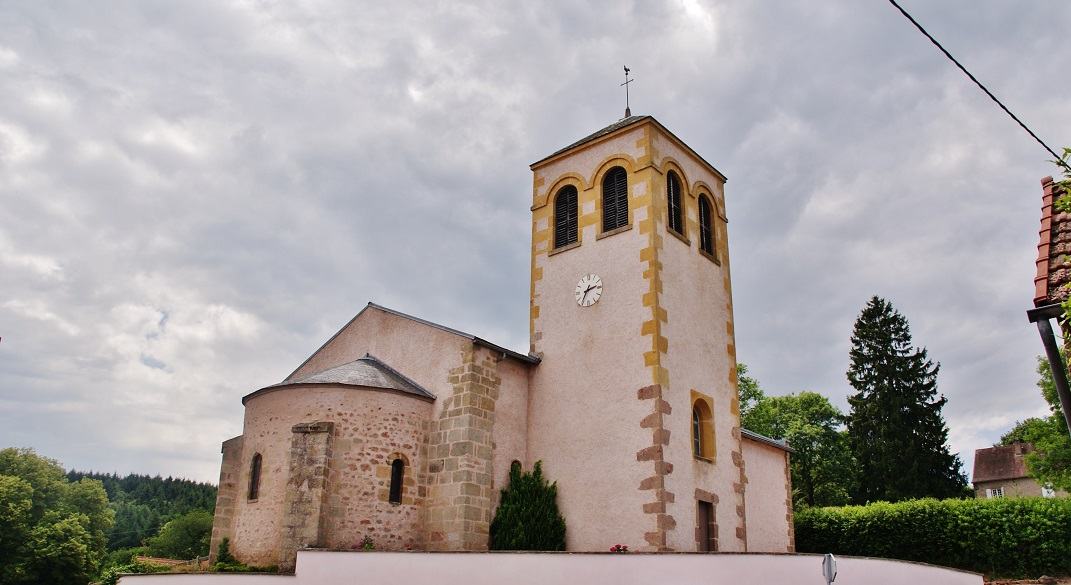
- The church in Loddes

- Coat of arms
- Location of Loddes
- Location within France Location within Auvergne-Rhône-Alpes
- Coordinates: 46°17′21″N 3°46′01″E
- Country: France
- Region: Auvergne-Rhône-Alpes
- Department: Allier
- Arrondissement: Vichy
- Canton: Dompierre-sur-Besbre
- Intercommunality: Entr'Allier Besbre et Loire

Government
  - Mayor (2026–32): Marie-France Augier
- Area^{1}: 23.49 km^{2} (9.07 sq mi)
- Elevation: 440 m (1,440 ft)
- Highest elevation: 532 m (1,745 ft)
- Lowest elevation: 354 m (1,161 ft)
- Population (2023): 166
  - Density: 7.07/km^{2} (18.3/sq mi)
- Time zone: UTC+01:00 (CET)
  - Summer (DST): UTC+02:00 (CEST)
- INSEE/Postal code: 03147 /03130
- ^{1} French Land Register data, which excludes lakes, ponds, glaciers > 1 km^{2} (0.386 sq mi or 247 acres) and river estuaries.

Loddes (French pronunciation: [lɔd]) is a commune in the Allier department in central France.

== Population ==
Historical population
Year	Pop.	±% p.a.
1968	342	—
1975	270	−3.32%
1982	217	−3.07%
1990	190	−1.65%
1999	191	+0.06%
2007	157	−2.42%
2012	157	+0.00%
2017	164	+0.88%
2023	166	+0.20%
Source: INSEE

== See also ==
- Communes of the Allier department
