= Beaulon =

- Commune
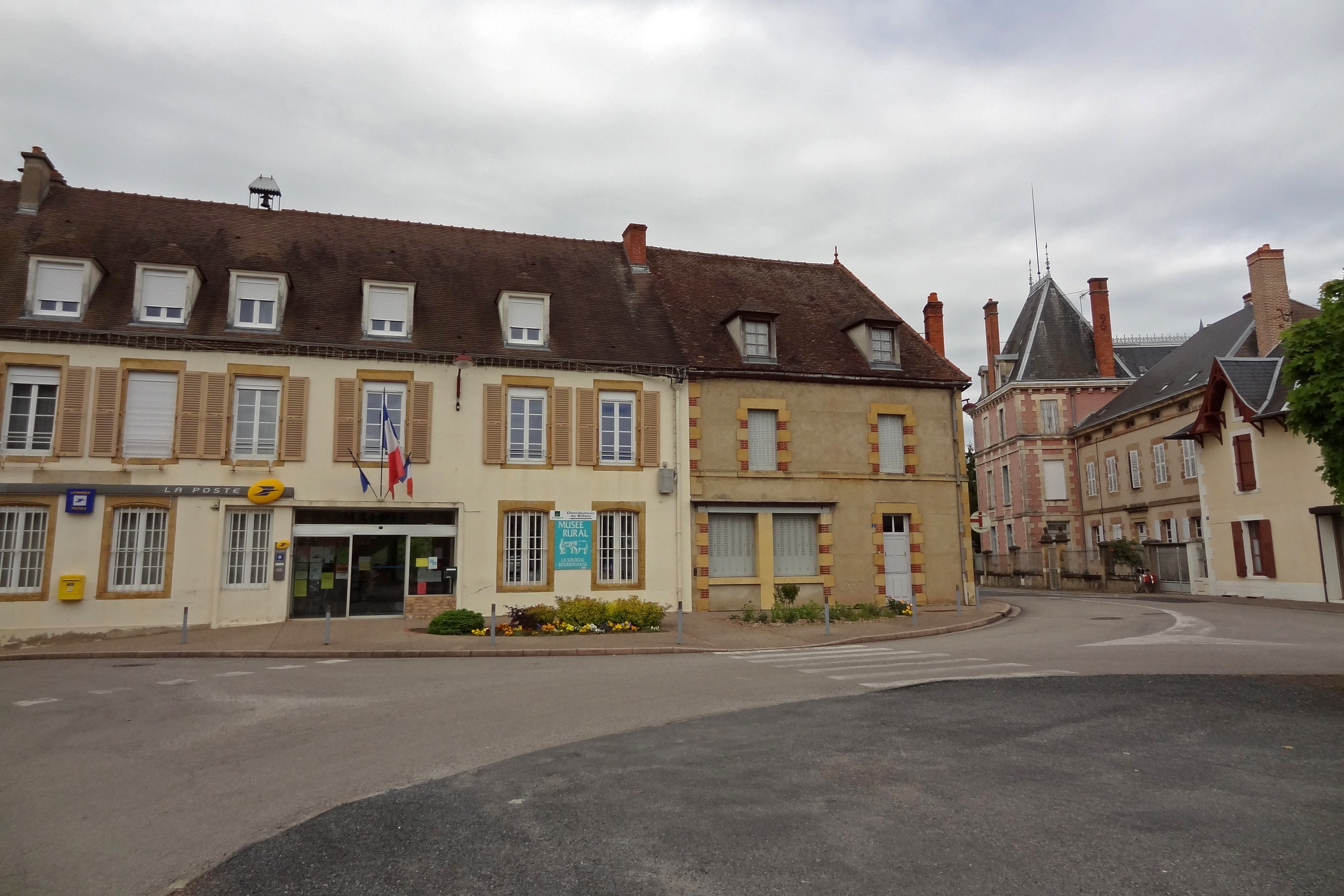
- The town hall and museum in Beaulon
- Location of Beaulon
- Location within France Location within Auvergne-Rhône-Alpes
- Coordinates: 46°36′09″N 3°40′26″E
- Country: France
- Region: Auvergne-Rhône-Alpes
- Department: Allier
- Arrondissement: Vichy
- Canton: Dompierre-sur-Besbre
- Intercommunality: Entr'Allier Besbre et Loire

Government
  - Mayor (2026–32): Patrick Benigaud
- Area^{1}: 63.98 km^{2} (24.70 sq mi)
- Elevation: 214 m (702 ft)
- Highest elevation: 263 m (863 ft)
- Lowest elevation: 203 m (666 ft)
- Population (2023): 1,649
  - Density: 25.77/km^{2} (66.75/sq mi)
- Demonym: Beaulonnais
- Time zone: UTC+01:00 (CET)
  - Summer (DST): UTC+02:00 (CEST)
- INSEE/Postal code: 03019 /03230
- Website: beaulon.com (in French)
- ^{1} French Land Register data, which excludes lakes, ponds, glaciers > 1 km^{2} (0.386 sq mi or 247 acres) and river estuaries.

Beaulon (French pronunciation: [bolɔ̃]) is a commune in the Allier department in central France.

== Population ==
Historical population
Year	Pop.	±% p.a.
1968	1,738	—
1975	1,767	+0.24%
1982	1,768	+0.01%
1990	1,744	−0.17%
1999	1,560	−1.23%
2007	1,606	+0.36%
2012	1,650	+0.54%
2017	1,651	+0.01%
2023	1,649	−0.02%
Source: INSEE

== Administration ==
List of successive mayors:

- 2008–2025: Alain Lognon
- 2025–2026: Dominique Martin
- 2026-incumbent: Patrick Benigaud

== See also ==
- Communes of the Allier department
