= Chevagnes =

- Commune
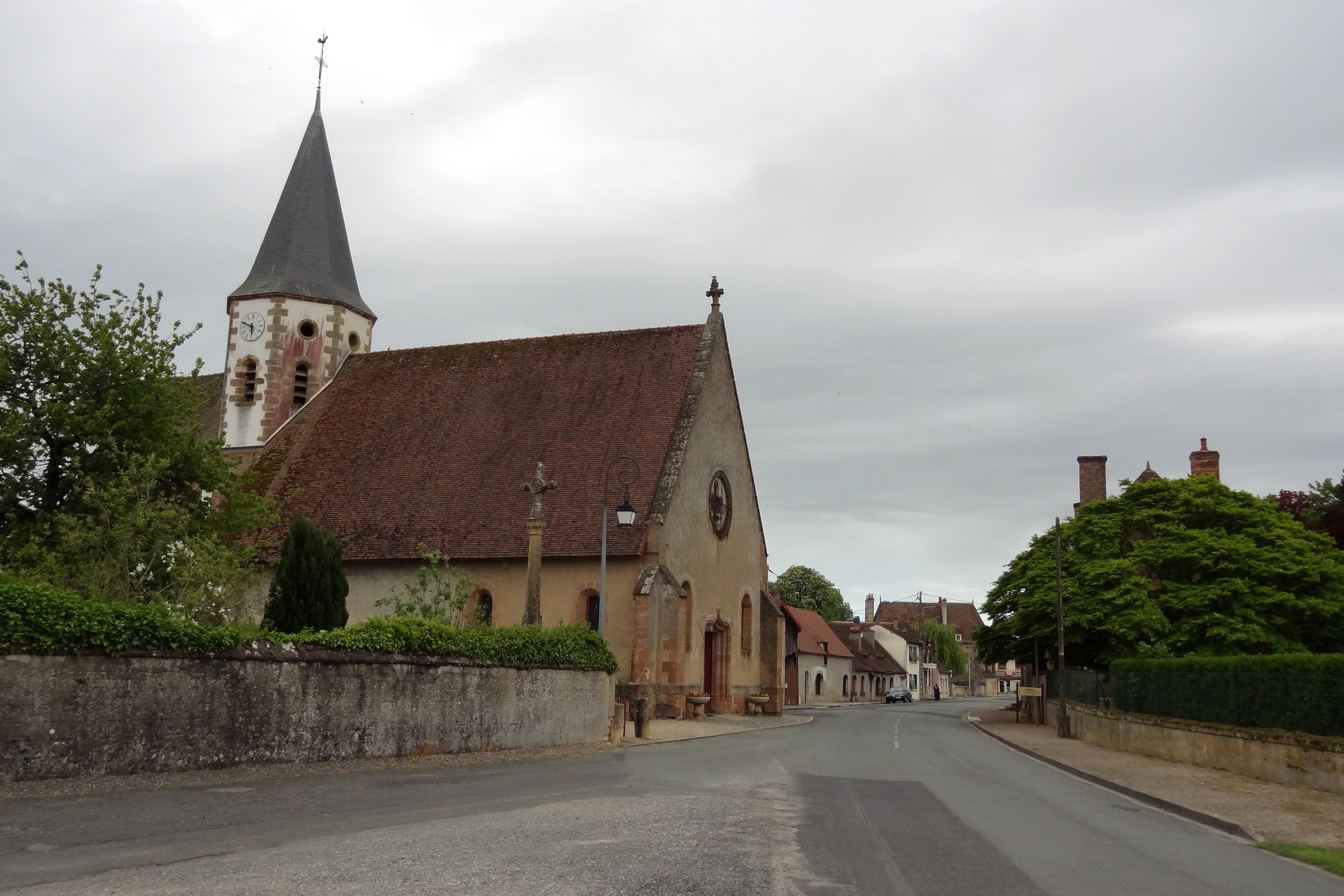
- The church in Chevagnes

- Coat of arms
- Location of Chevagnes
- Location within France Location within Auvergne-Rhône-Alpes
- Coordinates: 46°36′43″N 3°33′06″E
- Country: France
- Region: Auvergne-Rhône-Alpes
- Department: Allier
- Arrondissement: Moulins
- Canton: Dompierre-sur-Besbre
- Intercommunality: CA Moulins Communauté

Government
  - Mayor (2026–32): Laurent Sanchez
- Area^{1}: 49.78 km^{2} (19.22 sq mi)
- Elevation: 224 m (735 ft)
- Highest elevation: 262 m (860 ft)
- Lowest elevation: 215 m (705 ft)
- Population (2023): 630
  - Density: 13/km^{2} (33/sq mi)
- Time zone: UTC+01:00 (CET)
  - Summer (DST): UTC+02:00 (CEST)
- INSEE/Postal code: 03074 /03230
- ^{1} French Land Register data, which excludes lakes, ponds, glaciers > 1 km^{2} (0.386 sq mi or 247 acres) and river estuaries.

Chevagnes (French pronunciation: [ʃəvaɲ]) is a commune in the Allier department in central France.

== Population ==
Historical population
Year	Pop.	±% p.a.
1968	785	—
1975	711	−1.40%
1982	719	+0.16%
1990	729	+0.17%
1999	716	−0.20%
2007	699	−0.30%
2012	683	−0.46%
2017	663	−0.59%
2023	630	−0.85%
Source: INSEE

== See also ==
- Communes of the Allier department
