= Le Donjon =

- Commune
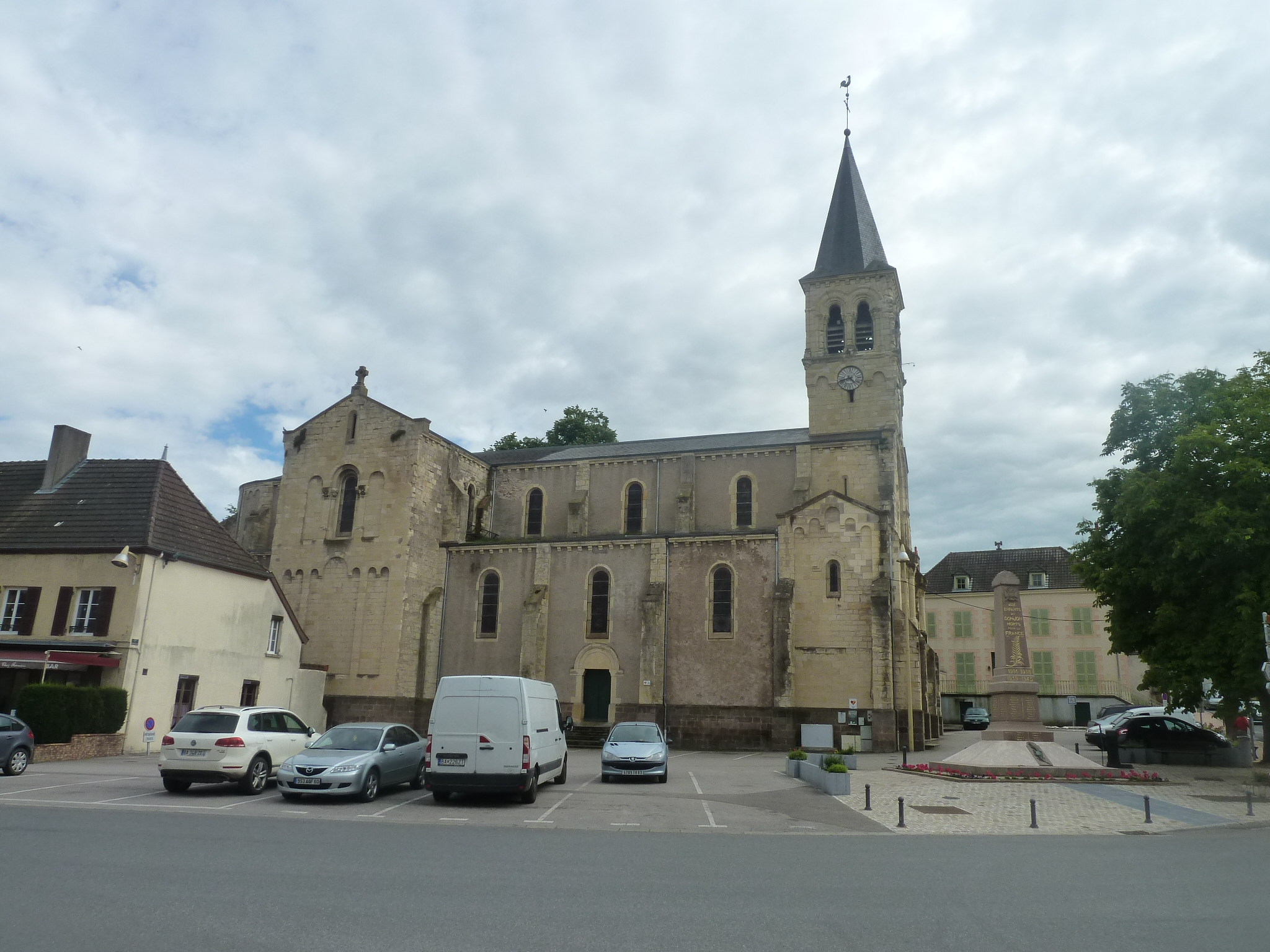
- The church in Le Donjon

- Coat of arms
- Location of Le Donjon
- Location within France Location within Auvergne-Rhône-Alpes
- Coordinates: 46°21′05″N 3°47′37″E
- Country: France
- Region: Auvergne-Rhône-Alpes
- Department: Allier
- Arrondissement: Vichy
- Canton: Dompierre-sur-Besbre

Government
  - Mayor (2026–32): Guy Labbe
- Area^{1}: 37.02 km^{2} (14.29 sq mi)
- Elevation: 292 m (958 ft)
- Highest elevation: 466 m (1,529 ft)
- Lowest elevation: 265 m (869 ft)
- Population (2023): 1,007
  - Density: 27.20/km^{2} (70.45/sq mi)
- Time zone: UTC+01:00 (CET)
  - Summer (DST): UTC+02:00 (CEST)
- INSEE/Postal code: 03103 /03130
- ^{1} French Land Register data, which excludes lakes, ponds, glaciers > 1 km^{2} (0.386 sq mi or 247 acres) and river estuaries.

Le Donjon (French pronunciation: [lə dɔ̃ʒɔ̃]) is a commune in the Allier department in central France.

== Population ==
Historical population
Year	Pop.	±% p.a.
1968	1,512	—
1975	1,447	−0.63%
1982	1,366	−0.82%
1990	1,258	−1.02%
1999	1,168	−0.82%
2007	1,067	−1.12%
2012	1,084	+0.32%
2017	1,069	−0.28%
2023	1,007	−0.99%
Source: INSEE

== See also ==
- Communes of the Allier department
