= Saint-Léger-sur-Vouzance =

- Commune
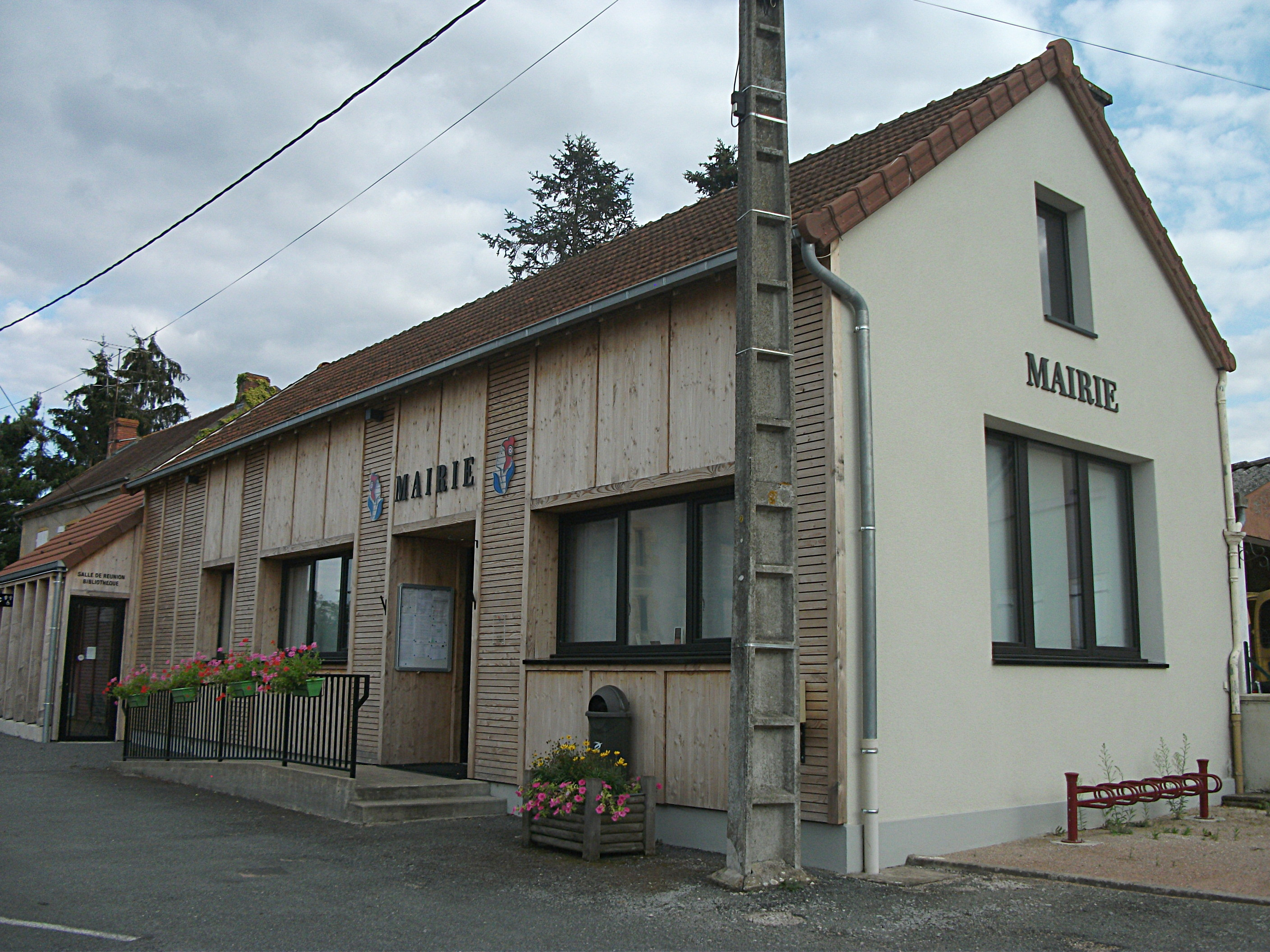
- Town hall
- Location of Saint-Léger-sur-Vouzance
- Location within France Location within Auvergne-Rhône-Alpes
- Coordinates: 46°24′36″N 3°56′14″E
- Country: France
- Region: Auvergne-Rhône-Alpes
- Department: Allier
- Arrondissement: Vichy
- Canton: Dompierre-sur-Besbre
- Intercommunality: Entr'Allier Besbre et Loire

Government
  - Mayor (2026–32): Michel Rajaud
- Area^{1}: 18.18 km^{2} (7.02 sq mi)
- Elevation: 224 m (735 ft)
- Highest elevation: 302 m (991 ft)
- Lowest elevation: 234 m (768 ft)
- Population (2023): 258
  - Density: 14.2/km^{2} (36.8/sq mi)
- Time zone: UTC+01:00 (CET)
  - Summer (DST): UTC+02:00 (CEST)
- INSEE/Postal code: 03239 /03130
- ^{1} French Land Register data, which excludes lakes, ponds, glaciers > 1 km^{2} (0.386 sq mi or 247 acres) and river estuaries.

Saint-Léger-sur-Vouzance (French pronunciation: [sɛ̃ leʒe syʁ vuzɑ̃s]) is a commune in the Allier department in Auvergne-Rhône-Alpes in central France.

== Population ==
Historical population
Year	Pop.	±% p.a.
1968	398	—
1975	353	−1.70%
1982	343	−0.41%
1990	350	+0.25%
1999	312	−1.27%
2007	286	−1.08%
2012	268	−1.29%
2017	265	−0.22%
2023	258	−0.45%
Source: INSEE

== See also ==
- Communes of the Allier department
