= Paray-le-Frésil =

- Commune
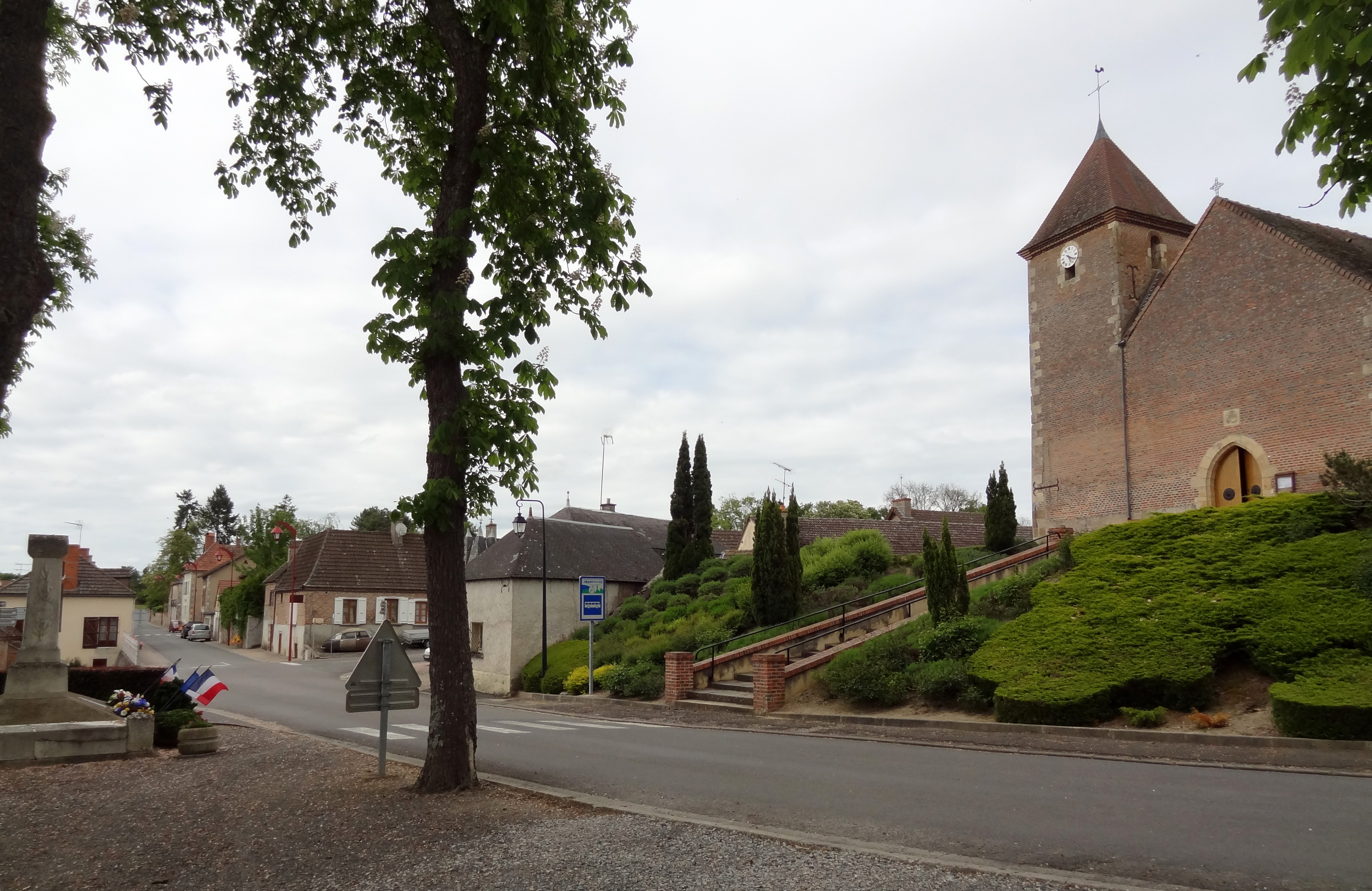
- A general view of Paray-le-Frésil
- Location of Paray-le-Frésil
- Location within France Location within Auvergne-Rhône-Alpes
- Coordinates: 46°39′24″N 3°36′42″E
- Country: France
- Region: Auvergne-Rhône-Alpes
- Department: Allier
- Arrondissement: Moulins
- Canton: Dompierre-sur-Besbre
- Intercommunality: CA Moulins Communauté

Government
  - Mayor (2026–32): Odile Marion
- Area^{1}: 37.3 km^{2} (14.4 sq mi)
- Elevation: 225 m (738 ft)
- Highest elevation: 252 m (827 ft)
- Lowest elevation: 205 m (673 ft)
- Population (2023): 376
  - Density: 10.1/km^{2} (26.1/sq mi)
- Time zone: UTC+01:00 (CET)
  - Summer (DST): UTC+02:00 (CEST)
- INSEE/Postal code: 03203 /03230
- ^{1} French Land Register data, which excludes lakes, ponds, glaciers > 1 km^{2} (0.386 sq mi or 247 acres) and river estuaries.

Paray-le-Frésil (French pronunciation: [paʁɛ lə fʁezil]) is a commune in the Allier department in Auvergne in central France.

== Population ==
Historical population
Year	Pop.	±% p.a.
1968	573	—
1975	522	−1.32%
1982	547	+0.67%
1990	469	−1.90%
1999	417	−1.30%
2007	430	+0.38%
2012	391	−1.88%
2017	389	−0.10%
2023	376	−0.56%
Source: INSEE

== See also ==
- Communes of the Allier department
