= La Chapelle-aux-Chasses =

- Commune
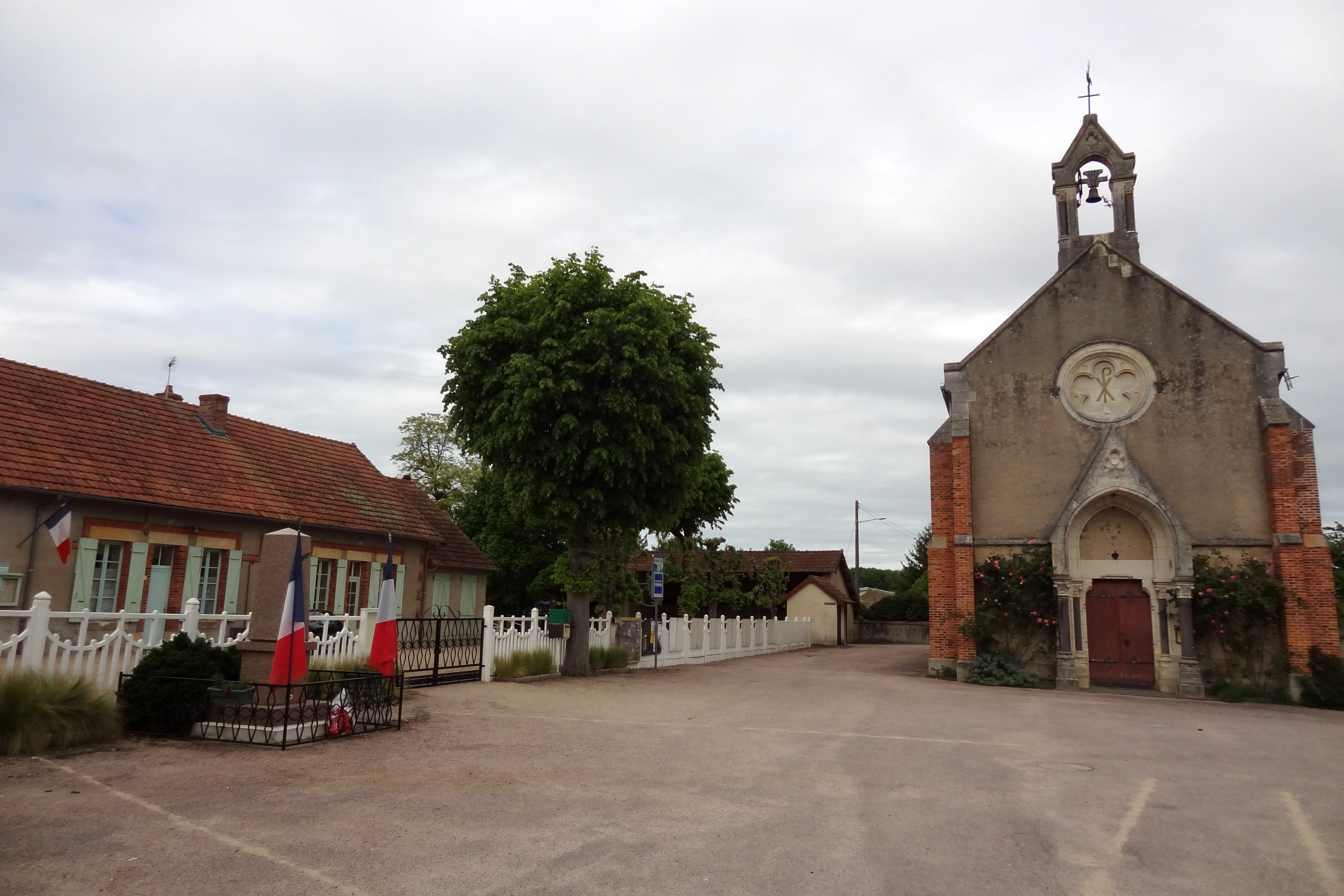
- The town hall and church in La Chapelle-aux-Chasses
- Location of La Chapelle-aux-Chasses
- Location within France Location within Auvergne-Rhône-Alpes
- Coordinates: 46°40′17″N 3°31′56″E
- Country: France
- Region: Auvergne-Rhône-Alpes
- Department: Allier
- Arrondissement: Moulins
- Canton: Dompierre-sur-Besbre
- Intercommunality: CA Moulins Communauté

Government
  - Mayor (2026–32): Carine Barillet
- Area^{1}: 25.96 km^{2} (10.02 sq mi)
- Elevation: 227 m (745 ft)
- Highest elevation: 251 m (823 ft)
- Lowest elevation: 207 m (679 ft)
- Population (2023): 197
  - Density: 7.59/km^{2} (19.7/sq mi)
- Time zone: UTC+01:00 (CET)
  - Summer (DST): UTC+02:00 (CEST)
- INSEE/Postal code: 03057 /03230
- ^{1} French Land Register data, which excludes lakes, ponds, glaciers > 1 km^{2} (0.386 sq mi or 247 acres) and river estuaries.

La Chapelle-aux-Chasses (French pronunciation: [la ʃapɛl o ʃas]) is a commune in the Allier department in central France.

== Population ==
Historical population
Year	Pop.	±% p.a.
1968	342	—
1975	295	−2.09%
1982	266	−1.47%
1990	250	−0.77%
1999	216	−1.61%
2007	235	+1.06%
2012	208	−2.41%
2017	210	+0.19%
2023	197	−1.06%
Source: INSEE

== See also ==
- Communes of the Allier department
