= Thiel-sur-Acolin =

- Commune
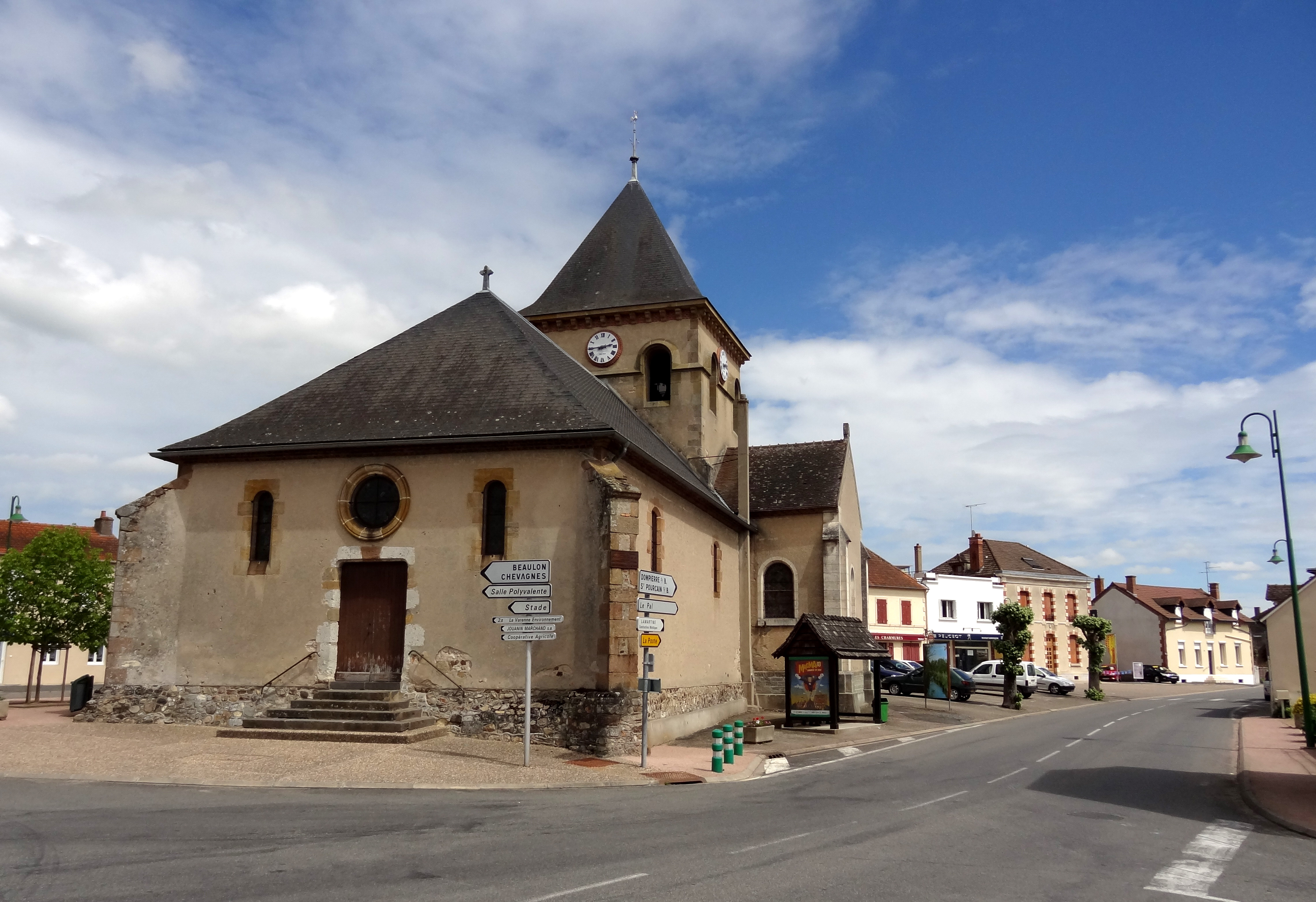
- The church in Thiel-sur-Acolin
- Location of Thiel-sur-Acolin
- Location within France Location within Auvergne-Rhône-Alpes
- Coordinates: 46°31′27″N 3°34′57″E
- Country: France
- Region: Auvergne-Rhône-Alpes
- Department: Allier
- Arrondissement: Moulins
- Canton: Dompierre-sur-Besbre
- Intercommunality: CA Moulins Communauté

Government
  - Mayor (2026–32): Catherine Provost
- Area^{1}: 57.71 km^{2} (22.28 sq mi)
- Elevation: 246 m (807 ft)
- Highest elevation: 286 m (938 ft)
- Lowest elevation: 228 m (748 ft)
- Population (2023): 1,027
  - Density: 17.80/km^{2} (46.09/sq mi)
- Time zone: UTC+01:00 (CET)
  - Summer (DST): UTC+02:00 (CEST)
- INSEE/Postal code: 03283 /03230
- ^{1} French Land Register data, which excludes lakes, ponds, glaciers > 1 km^{2} (0.386 sq mi or 247 acres) and river estuaries.

Thiel-sur-Acolin (French pronunciation: [tjɛl syʁ akɔlɛ̃], literally Thiel on Acolin) is a commune in the Allier department in Auvergne-Rhône-Alpes in central France.

== Population ==
Historical population
Year	Pop.	±% p.a.
1968	1,192	—
1975	1,168	−0.29%
1982	1,083	−1.07%
1990	1,032	−0.60%
1999	925	−1.21%
2007	959	+0.45%
2012	1,033	+1.50%
2017	1,125	+1.72%
2023	1,027	−1.51%
Source: INSEE

== See also ==
- Communes of the Allier department
