= Le Pin, Allier =

Le Pin
- Commune
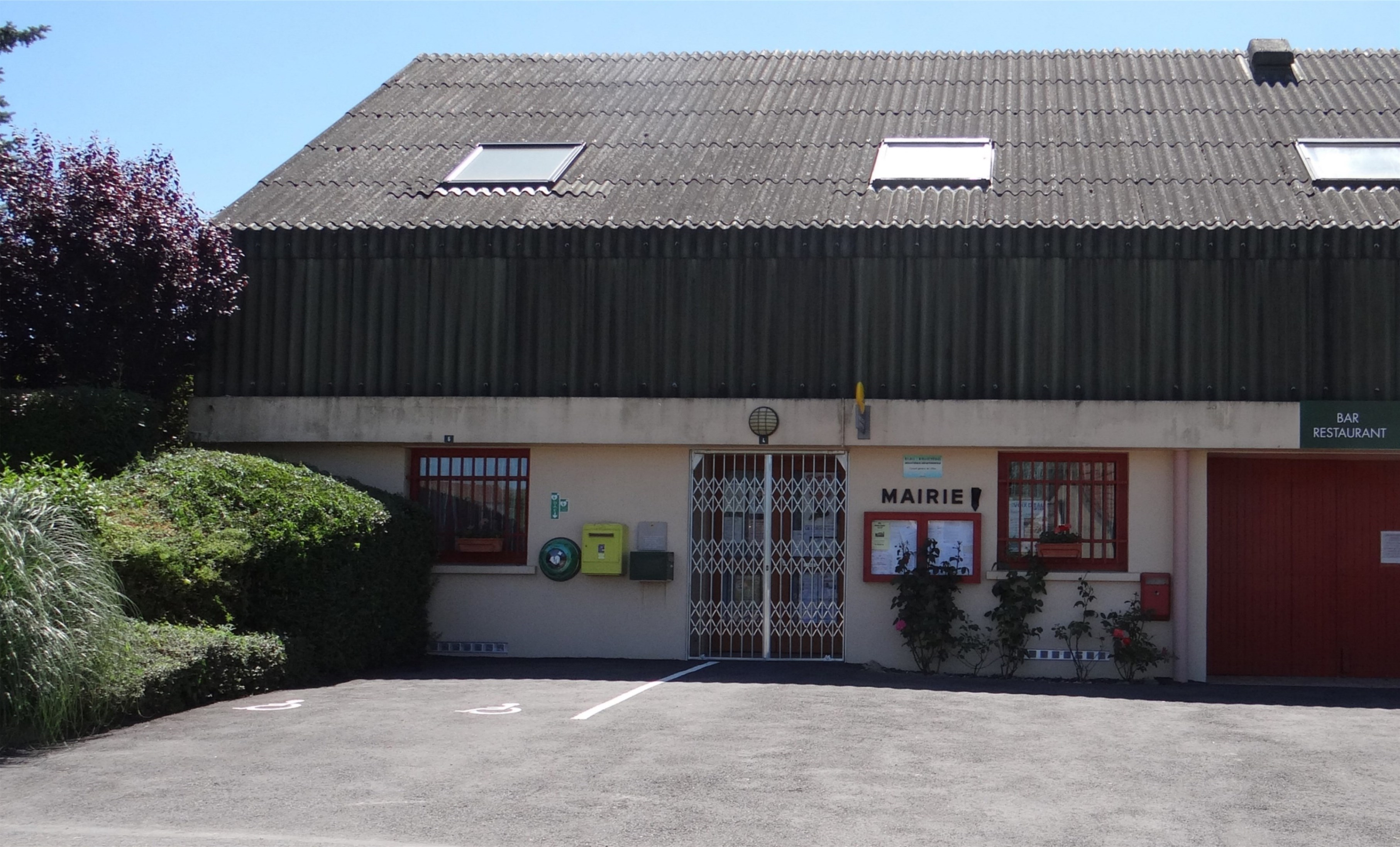
- Town hall
- Location of Le Pin
- Location within France Location within Auvergne-Rhône-Alpes
- Coordinates: 46°24′48″N 3°53′41″E
- Country: France
- Region: Auvergne-Rhône-Alpes
- Department: Allier
- Arrondissement: Vichy
- Canton: Dompierre-sur-Besbre

Government
  - Mayor (2026–32): Laëtitia Vary
- Area^{1}: 21.78 km^{2} (8.41 sq mi)
- Elevation: 278 m (912 ft)
- Highest elevation: 307 m (1,007 ft)
- Lowest elevation: 237 m (778 ft)
- Population (2023): 432
  - Density: 19.8/km^{2} (51.4/sq mi)
- Time zone: UTC+01:00 (CET)
  - Summer (DST): UTC+02:00 (CEST)
- INSEE/Postal code: 03208 /03130
- ^{1} French Land Register data, which excludes lakes, ponds, glaciers > 1 km^{2} (0.386 sq mi or 247 acres) and river estuaries.

Le Pin (French pronunciation: [lə pɛ̃]) is a commune in the Allier department in Auvergne in central France.

== Population ==
Historical population
Year	Pop.	±% p.a.
1968	539	—
1975	502	−1.01%
1982	458	−1.30%
1990	413	−1.28%
1999	381	−0.89%
2007	375	−0.20%
2012	400	+1.30%
2017	411	+0.54%
2023	432	+0.83%
Source: INSEE

== See also ==
- Communes of the Allier department
