= Garnat-sur-Engièvre =

- Commune
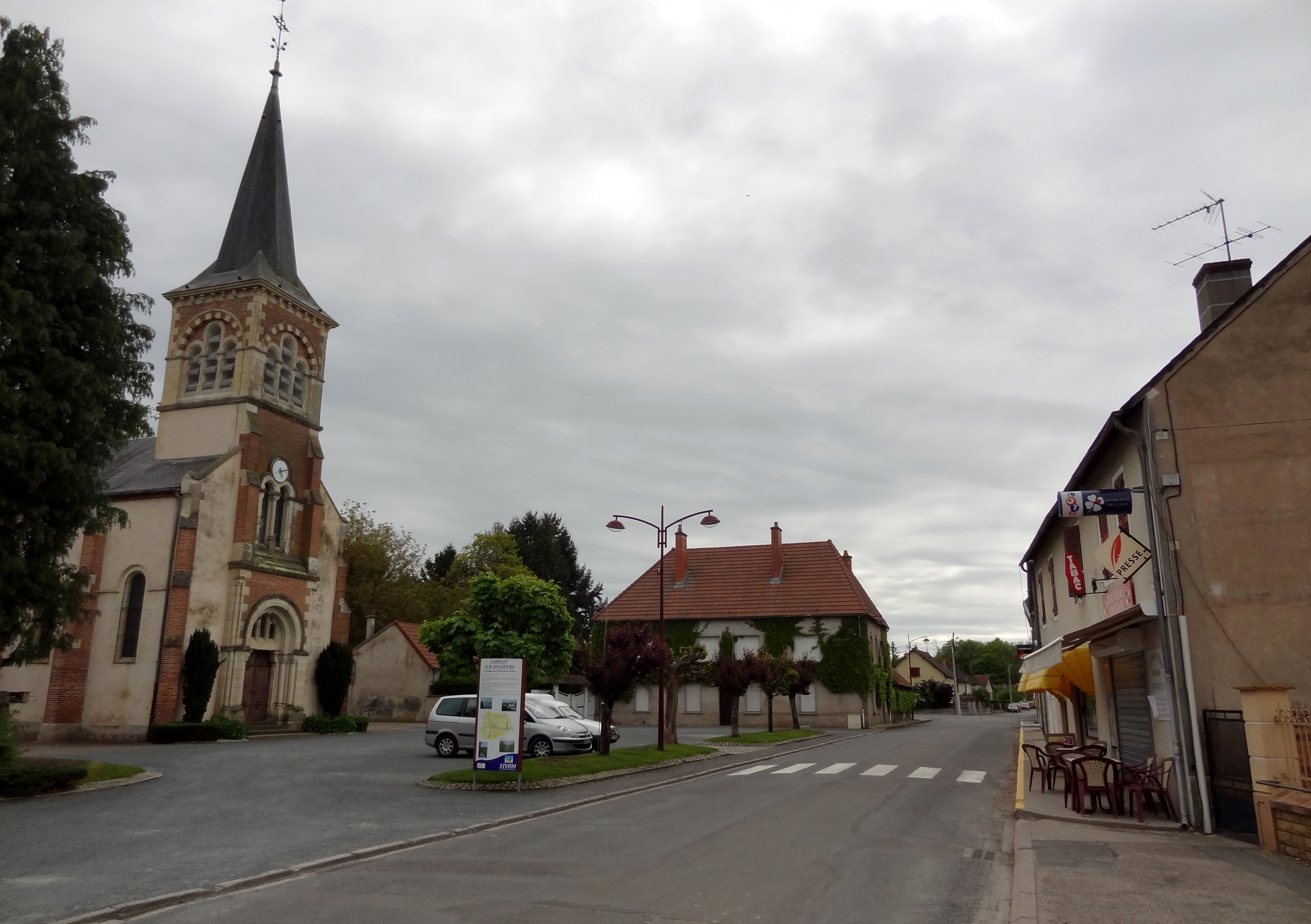
- The main road in Garnat-sur-Engièvre
- Location of Garnat-sur-Engièvre
- Location within France Location within Auvergne-Rhône-Alpes
- Coordinates: 46°38′04″N 3°39′49″E
- Country: France
- Region: Auvergne-Rhône-Alpes
- Department: Allier
- Arrondissement: Moulins
- Canton: Dompierre-sur-Besbre
- Intercommunality: CA Moulins Communauté

Government
  - Mayor (2026–32): Joël Lamouche
- Area^{1}: 18.74 km^{2} (7.24 sq mi)
- Elevation: 200 m (660 ft)
- Highest elevation: 242 m (794 ft)
- Lowest elevation: 202 m (663 ft)
- Population (2023): 653
  - Density: 34.8/km^{2} (90.2/sq mi)
- Time zone: UTC+01:00 (CET)
  - Summer (DST): UTC+02:00 (CEST)
- INSEE/Postal code: 03120 /03230
- ^{1} French Land Register data, which excludes lakes, ponds, glaciers > 1 km^{2} (0.386 sq mi or 247 acres) and river estuaries.

Garnat-sur-Engièvre (French pronunciation: [ɡaʁna syʁ ɑ̃ʒjɛvʁ]) is a commune in the Allier department in central France.

== Population ==
Historical population
Year	Pop.	±% p.a.
1968	786	—
1975	762	−0.44%
1982	722	−0.77%
1990	715	−0.12%
1999	734	+0.29%
2007	719	−0.26%
2012	688	−0.88%
2017	705	+0.49%
2023	653	−1.27%
Source: INSEE

== See also ==
- Communes of the Allier department
