= Le Bouchaud =

- Commune
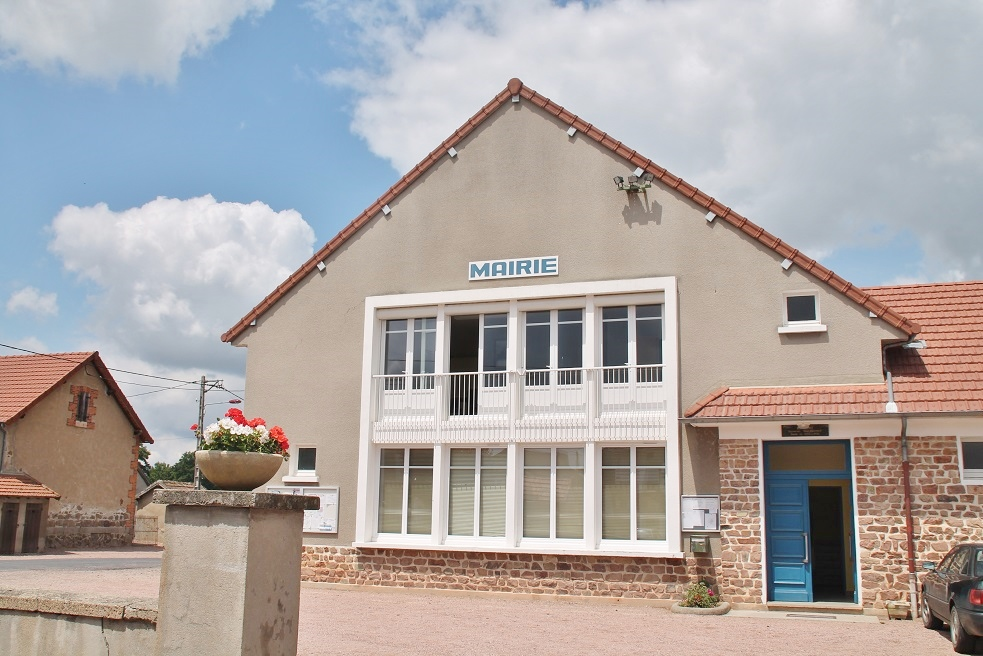
- Town hall
- Location of Le Bouchaud
- Location within France Location within Auvergne-Rhône-Alpes
- Coordinates: 46°18′23″N 3°53′56″E
- Country: France
- Region: Auvergne-Rhône-Alpes
- Department: Allier
- Arrondissement: Vichy
- Canton: Dompierre-sur-Besbre

Government
  - Mayor (2026–32): André Truge
- Area^{1}: 22.55 km^{2} (8.71 sq mi)
- Elevation: 300 m (980 ft)
- Highest elevation: 332 m (1,089 ft)
- Lowest elevation: 269 m (883 ft)
- Population (2023): 192
  - Density: 8.51/km^{2} (22.1/sq mi)
- Time zone: UTC+01:00 (CET)
  - Summer (DST): UTC+02:00 (CEST)
- INSEE/Postal code: 03035 /03130
- ^{1} French Land Register data, which excludes lakes, ponds, glaciers > 1 km^{2} (0.386 sq mi or 247 acres) and river estuaries.

Le Bouchaud (French pronunciation: [lə buʃo]) is a commune in the Allier department in central France.

== Population ==
Historical population
Year	Pop.	±% p.a.
1968	377	—
1975	341	−1.42%
1982	277	−2.93%
1990	253	−1.13%
1999	222	−1.44%
2007	210	−0.69%
2012	204	−0.58%
2017	214	+0.96%
2023	192	−1.79%
Source: INSEE

== See also ==
- Communes of the Allier department
