= Chézy, Allier =

Chézy
- Commune
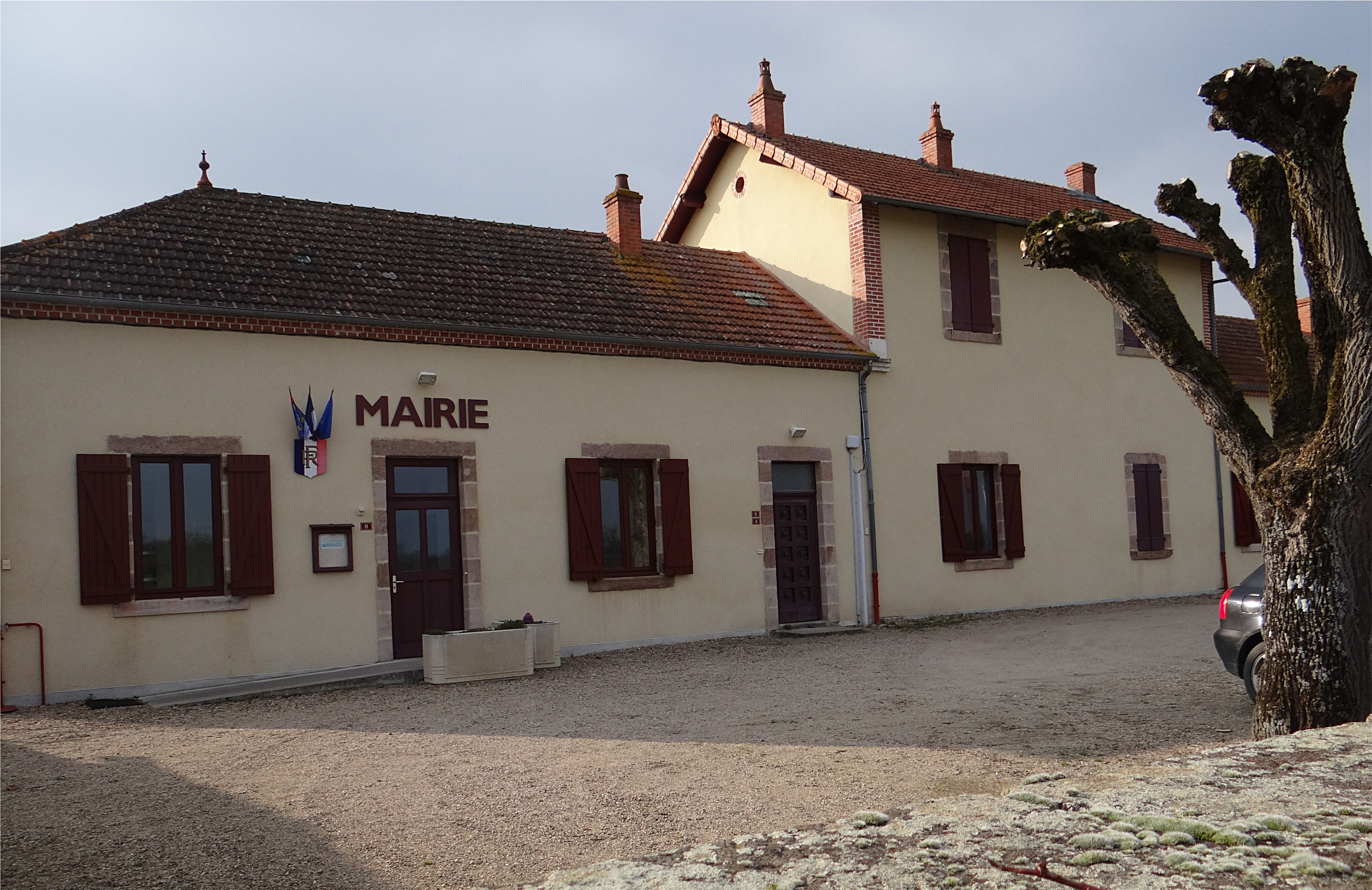
- Town hall
- Location of Chézy
- Location within France Location within Auvergne-Rhône-Alpes
- Coordinates: 46°36′41″N 3°28′07″E
- Country: France
- Region: Auvergne-Rhône-Alpes
- Department: Allier
- Arrondissement: Moulins
- Canton: Dompierre-sur-Besbre
- Intercommunality: CA Moulins Communauté

Government
  - Mayor (2026–32): Xavier Faivre-Duboz
- Area^{1}: 36.53 km^{2} (14.10 sq mi)
- Elevation: 240 m (790 ft)
- Highest elevation: 274 m (899 ft)
- Lowest elevation: 218 m (715 ft)
- Population (2023): 212
  - Density: 5.80/km^{2} (15.0/sq mi)
- Time zone: UTC+01:00 (CET)
  - Summer (DST): UTC+02:00 (CEST)
- INSEE/Postal code: 03076 /03230
- ^{1} French Land Register data, which excludes lakes, ponds, glaciers > 1 km^{2} (0.386 sq mi or 247 acres) and river estuaries.

Chézy (French pronunciation: [ʃezi]) is a commune in the Allier department in central France.

== Population ==
Historical population
Year	Pop.	±% p.a.
1968	305	—
1975	245	−3.08%
1982	203	−2.65%
1990	244	+2.33%
1999	218	−1.24%
2007	209	−0.53%
2012	210	+0.10%
2017	243	+2.96%
2023	212	−2.25%
Source: INSEE

== See also ==
- Communes of the Allier department
