= Gannay-sur-Loire =

- Commune
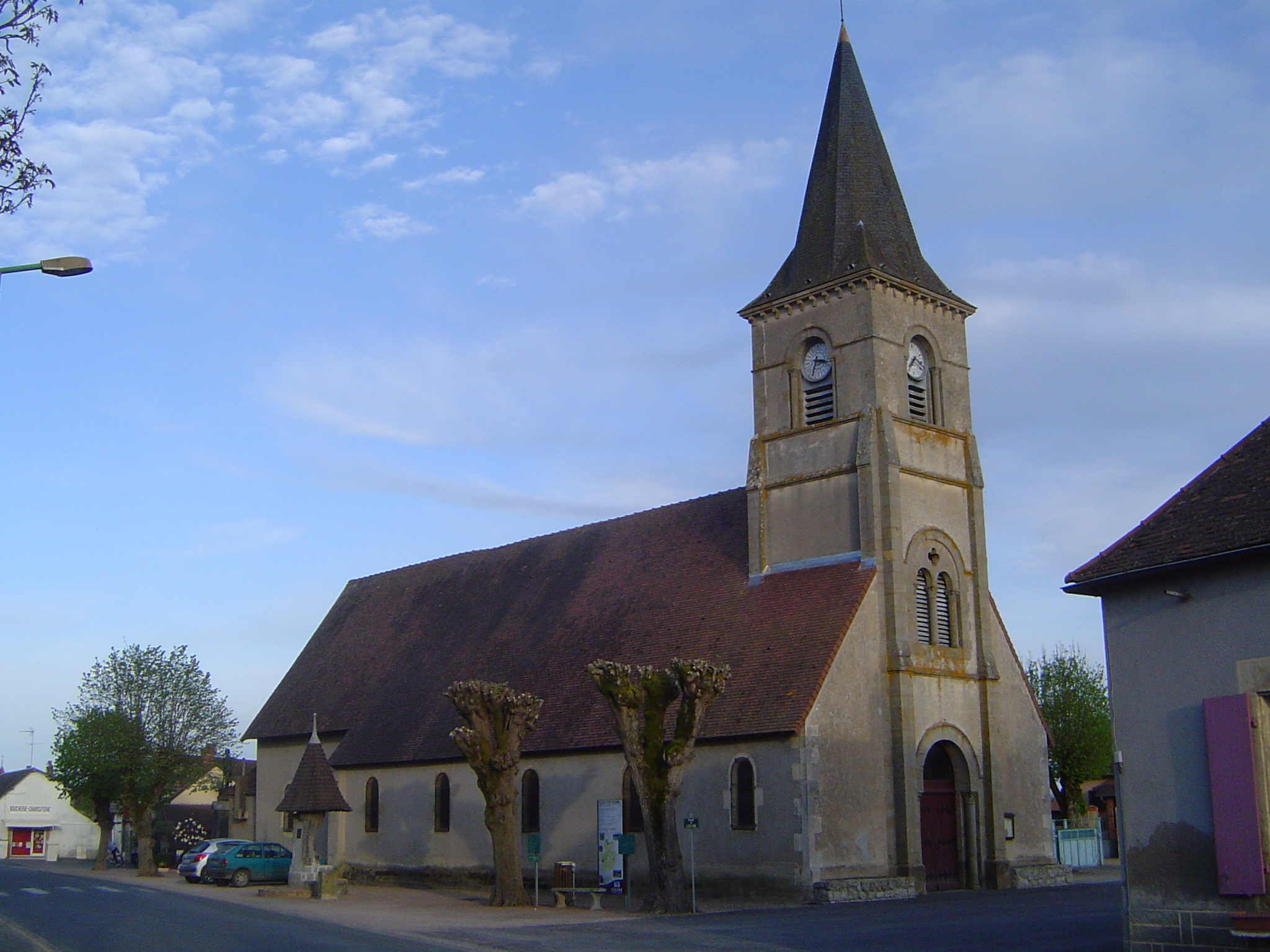

- Coat of arms
- Location of Gannay-sur-Loire
- Location within France Location within Auvergne-Rhône-Alpes
- Coordinates: 46°43′55″N 3°36′40″E
- Country: France
- Region: Auvergne-Rhône-Alpes
- Department: Allier
- Arrondissement: Moulins
- Canton: Dompierre-sur-Besbre
- Intercommunality: CA Moulins Communauté

Government
  - Mayor (2026–32): Stéphanie Bel
- Area^{1}: 32.29 km^{2} (12.47 sq mi)
- Elevation: 202 m (663 ft)
- Highest elevation: 240 m (790 ft)
- Lowest elevation: 193 m (633 ft)
- Population (2023): 384
  - Density: 11.9/km^{2} (30.8/sq mi)
- Time zone: UTC+01:00 (CET)
  - Summer (DST): UTC+02:00 (CEST)
- INSEE/Postal code: 03119 /03230
- ^{1} French Land Register data, which excludes lakes, ponds, glaciers > 1 km^{2} (0.386 sq mi or 247 acres) and river estuaries.

Gannay-sur-Loire (French pronunciation: [ɡanɛ syʁ lwaʁ], literally Gannay on Loire) is a commune in the Allier department in central France.

== Population ==
Historical population
Year	Pop.	±% p.a.
1968	665	—
1975	571	−2.15%
1982	501	−1.85%
1990	491	−0.25%
1999	387	−2.61%
2007	409	+0.69%
2012	406	−0.15%
2017	409	+0.15%
2023	384	−1.05%
Source: INSEE

== See also ==
- Communes of the Allier department
