= Saint-Martin-des-Lais =

- Commune
- Coat of arms
- Location of Saint-Martin-des-Lais
- Location within France Location within Auvergne-Rhône-Alpes
- Coordinates: 46°40′07″N 3°39′24″E
- Country: France
- Region: Auvergne-Rhône-Alpes
- Department: Allier
- Arrondissement: Moulins
- Canton: Dompierre-sur-Besbre
- Intercommunality: CA Moulins Communauté

Government
  - Mayor (2026–32): Jean-Marc Brunot
- Area^{1}: 18.25 km^{2} (7.05 sq mi)
- Elevation: 205 m (673 ft)
- Highest elevation: 209 m (686 ft)
- Lowest elevation: 197 m (646 ft)
- Population (2023): 122
  - Density: 6.68/km^{2} (17.3/sq mi)
- Time zone: UTC+01:00 (CET)
  - Summer (DST): UTC+02:00 (CEST)
- INSEE/Postal code: 03245 /03230
- ^{1} French Land Register data, which excludes lakes, ponds, glaciers > 1 km^{2} (0.386 sq mi or 247 acres) and river estuaries.

Saint-Martin-des-Lais (French pronunciation: [sɛ̃ maʁtɛ̃ de lɛ]) is a commune in the Allier department in Auvergne-Rhône-Alpes in central France.

== Population ==
Historical population
Year	Pop.	±% p.a.
1968	226	—
1975	222	−0.25%
1982	189	−2.27%
1990	174	−1.03%
1999	142	−2.23%
2007	141	−0.09%
2012	140	−0.14%
2017	123	−2.56%
2023	122	−0.14%
Source: INSEE

== See also ==
- Communes of the Allier department
