= Canton of Dompierre-sur-Besbre =

Coordinates: 46°31′23″N 3°40′55″E

Dompierre-sur-Besbre
- Canton
- Interactive map of Dompierre-sur-Besbre
- Country: France
- Region: Auvergne-Rhône-Alpes
- Department: Allier
- No. of communes: {{{nbcomm}}}
- Area: 1,006.80 km^{2} (388.73 sq mi)
- Population (2023): 19,631
  - Density: 19.498/km^{2} (50.501/sq mi)
- INSEE code: 03 05

The canton of Dompierre-sur-Besbre is an administrative division in central France. At the French canton reorganisation which came into effect in March 2015, the canton was expanded from 9 to 32 communes:

1. Avrilly
2. Beaulon
3. Le Bouchaud
4. La Chapelle-aux-Chasses
5. Chassenard
6. Chevagnes
7. Chézy
8. Coulanges
9. Diou
10. Dompierre-sur-Besbre
11. Le Donjon
12. Gannay-sur-Loire
13. Garnat-sur-Engièvre
14. Lenax
15. Loddes
16. Luneau
17. Lusigny
18. Molinet
19. Monétay-sur-Loire
20. Montaiguët-en-Forez
21. Montcombroux-les-Mines
22. Neuilly-en-Donjon
23. Paray-le-Frésil
24. Pierrefitte-sur-Loire
25. Le Pin
26. Saint-Didier-en-Donjon
27. Saint-Léger-sur-Vouzance
28. Saint-Martin-des-Lais
29. Saint-Pourçain-sur-Besbre
30. Saligny-sur-Roudon
31. Thiel-sur-Acolin
32. Vaumas

== Demographics ==
Historical population
Year	Pop.	±% p.a.
2013	20,614	—
2018	20,321	−0.29%
Source: INSEE

== See also ==
- Cantons of the Allier department
- Communes of France
