= Luneau =

- Commune
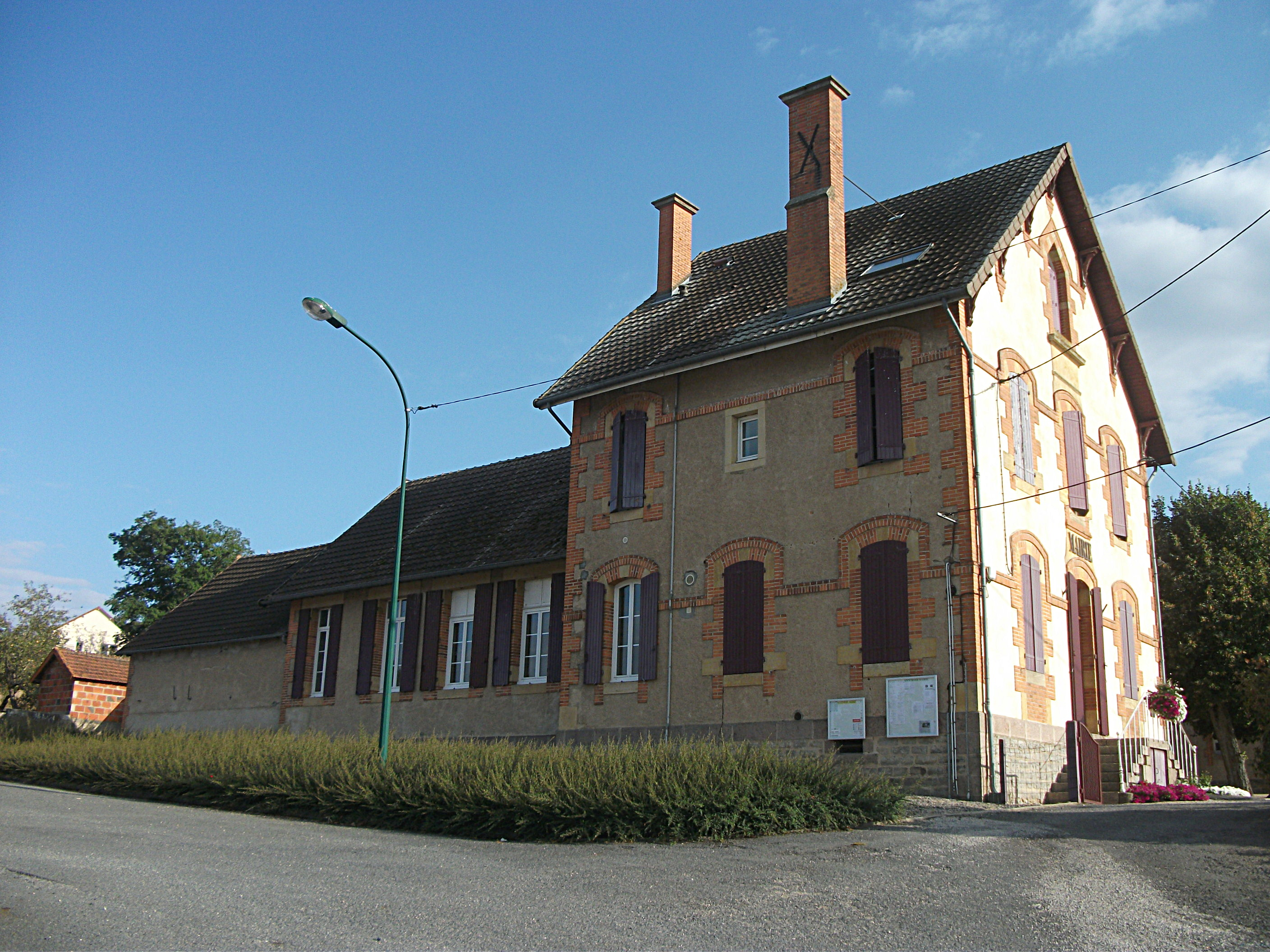
- Town hall
- Location of Luneau
- Location within France Location within Auvergne-Rhône-Alpes
- Coordinates: 46°21′51″N 3°57′09″E
- Country: France
- Region: Auvergne-Rhône-Alpes
- Department: Allier
- Arrondissement: Vichy
- Canton: Dompierre-sur-Besbre
- Intercommunality: Entr'Allier Besbre et Loire

Government
  - Mayor (2026–32): Jacqueline Laustriat
- Area^{1}: 27.27 km^{2} (10.53 sq mi)
- Elevation: 250 m (820 ft)
- Highest elevation: 302 m (991 ft)
- Lowest elevation: 232 m (761 ft)
- Population (2023): 277
  - Density: 10.2/km^{2} (26.3/sq mi)
- Time zone: UTC+01:00 (CET)
  - Summer (DST): UTC+02:00 (CEST)
- INSEE/Postal code: 03154 /03130
- ^{1} French Land Register data, which excludes lakes, ponds, glaciers > 1 km^{2} (0.386 sq mi or 247 acres) and river estuaries.

Luneau (French pronunciation: [lyno]) is a commune in the Allier department in central France.

== Population ==
Historical population
Year	Pop.	±% p.a.
1968	488	—
1975	461	−0.81%
1982	390	−2.36%
1990	335	−1.88%
1999	291	−1.55%
2007	282	−0.39%
2012	287	+0.35%
2017	291	+0.28%
2023	277	−0.82%
Source: INSEE

== See also ==
- Communes of the Allier department
