= Neuilly-en-Donjon =

- Commune
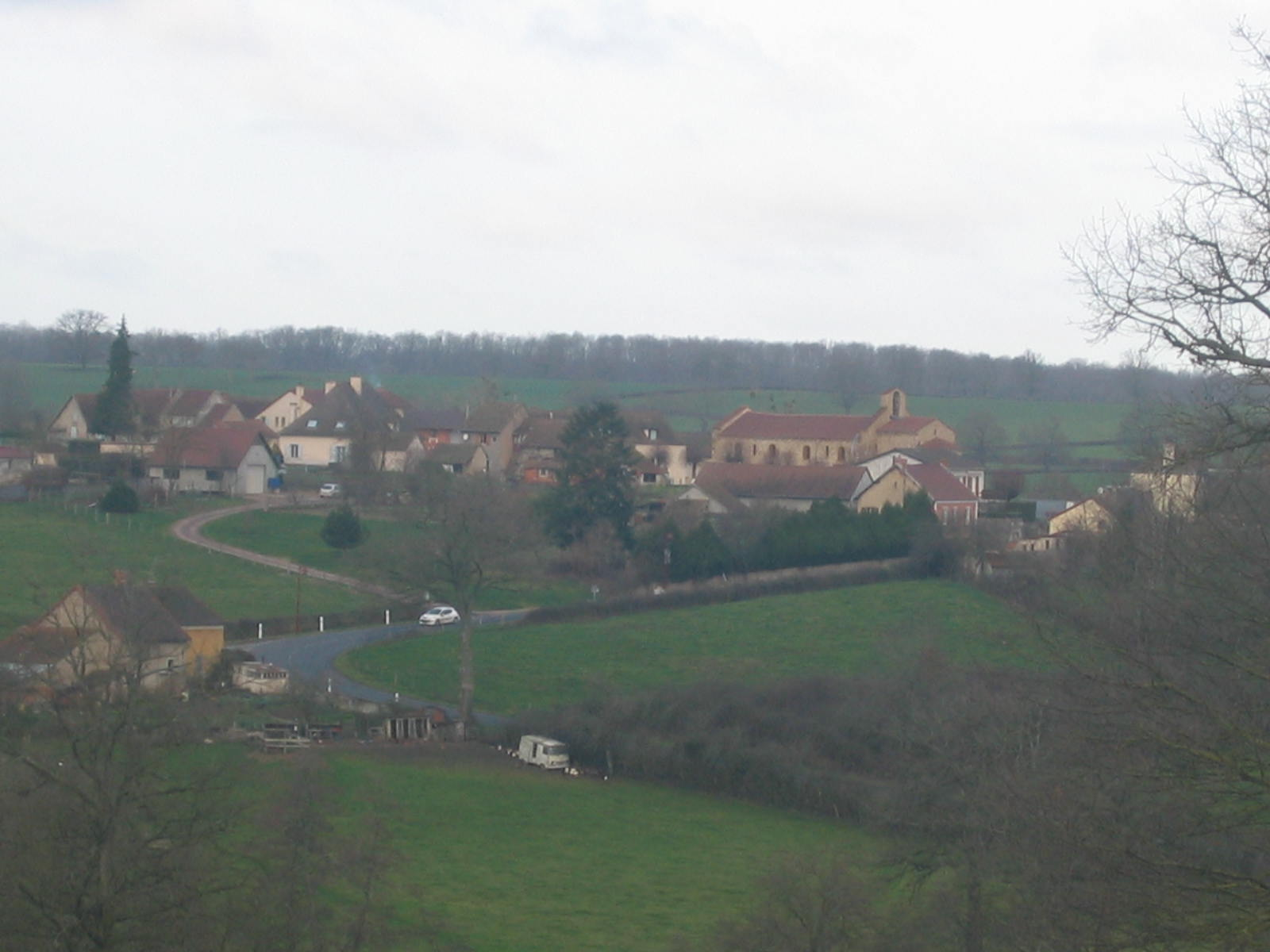
- A general view of Neuilly-en-Donjon
- Location of Neuilly-en-Donjon
- Location within France Location within Auvergne-Rhône-Alpes
- Coordinates: 46°20′45″N 3°53′11″E
- Country: France
- Region: Auvergne-Rhône-Alpes
- Department: Allier
- Arrondissement: Vichy
- Canton: Dompierre-sur-Besbre
- Intercommunality: Entr'Allier Besbre et Loire

Government
  - Mayor (2026–32): Bernard Bourachot
- Area^{1}: 25.02 km^{2} (9.66 sq mi)
- Elevation: 295 m (968 ft)
- Highest elevation: 326 m (1,070 ft)
- Lowest elevation: 258 m (846 ft)
- Population (2023): 198
  - Density: 7.91/km^{2} (20.5/sq mi)
- Time zone: UTC+01:00 (CET)
  - Summer (DST): UTC+02:00 (CEST)
- INSEE/Postal code: 03196 /03130
- ^{1} French Land Register data, which excludes lakes, ponds, glaciers > 1 km^{2} (0.386 sq mi or 247 acres) and river estuaries.

Neuilly-en-Donjon (French pronunciation: [nœji ɑ̃ dɔ̃ʒɔ̃]) is a commune in the Allier department in Auvergne in central France.

== Population ==
Historical population
Year	Pop.	±% p.a.
1968	486	—
1975	398	−2.81%
1982	363	−1.31%
1990	309	−1.99%
1999	228	−3.32%
2007	236	+0.43%
2012	218	−1.57%
2017	222	+0.36%
2023	198	−1.89%
Source: INSEE

== See also ==
- Communes of the Allier department
