= Canton of Escurolles =

Coordinates: 46.1442°N 3.2661°E

Escurolles
- Former canton
- Interactive map of Escurolles
- Country: France
- Region: Auvergne-Rhône-Alpes
- Department: Allier
- No. of communes: {{{nbcomm}}}
- Disbanded: 2015
- Population (2012): 21,155

Escurolles is a former canton of the arrondissement of Vichy, Allier, Auvergne, France. It was disbanded following the French canton reorganisation which came into effect in March 2015. It had 21,155 inhabitants (2012).

== Communes ==
The canton consisted of the following communes:

- Bellerive-sur-Allier
- Broût-Vernet
- Brugheas
- Charmeil
- Cognat-Lyonne
- Escurolles
- Espinasse-Vozelle
- Hauterive
- Saint-Didier-la-Forêt
- Saint-Pont
- Saint-Rémy-en-Rollat
- Serbannes
- Vendat

== See also ==
- Cantons of the Allier department
