= 2020 Allier municipal elections =

- 15 March 2020 and 28 June 2020

The 2020 Allier municipal elections took place on 15 March 2020, with a second round of voting initially expected for 22 March 2020. Like the rest of France, the second round was initially suspended due to the COVID-19 pandemic. On 22 May, Prime Minister Édouard Philippe announced that the second round of voting would take place on 28 June.

== Incumbent and elected mayors ==
In 2020, only 32 communes in Allier had a second round of elections, with the majority being decided with a single round absolute majority.

Aside from Bourbon-l'Archambault, candidates on the left were not able to recover communes lost in the previous elections, such as in Bellerive-sur-Allier, Cosne-d'Allier, Cusset, Gannat, Varennes-sur-Allier, and Vendat. The left was consoled with a victory in Commentry. The right easily retained its position in the four largest communes of the department, despite a perilous four-way second round in Montluçon.

Incumbent and elected mayors for communes with a population of more than 2,000 inhabitants (plus Lurcy-Lévis)
Commune	Population (2017)	Incumbent mayor	Party	Second round (Yes/No)	Elected mayor	Party	Ref.
Abrest	2,931	Patrick Montagner	DVG	Yes	Romain Lopez	DVD	
Avermes	3,966	Alain Denizot	PS	No	Alain Denizot	PS	
Bellerive-sur-Allier	8,500	François Sennepin	DVD	No	François Sennepin	DVD	
Bourbon-l'Archambault	2,559	Anne Leclercq	DVD	No	Jacky Belien	PCF	
Commentry	6,239	Fernand Spaccaferri	DVD	No	Sylvain Bourdier	DVG	
Cosne-d'Allier	2,039	Martial Sanlias	DVD	No	Marie Carré	DVD	
Creuzier-le-Vieux	3,304	Christian Bertin	DVG	No	Hadrien Fayet	DVG	
Cusset	12,661	Jean-Sébastien Laloy	LR	No	Jean-Sébastien Laloy	LR	
Désertines	4,422	Christian Sanvoisin	PCF	No	Christian Sanvoisin	PCF	
Domérat	8,780	Marc Malbet	PS	No	Pascale Lescurat	PS	
Dompierre-sur-Besbre	3,040	Pascal Vernisse	DVG	No	Michel Brunner	PS	
Gannat	5,832	Véronique Pouzadoux	LR	No	Véronique Pouzadoux	DVD	
Huriel	2,646	Stéphane Abranowitch	DVG	No	Stéphane Abranowitch	DVG	
Lapalisse	3,123	Jacques de Chabannes	PRG	No	Jacques de Chabannes	PRG	
Lurcy-Lévis	1,893	Claude Vanneau	DVD	No	Patrick Combemorel	DVD	
Montluçon	35,653	Frédéric Laporte	LR	Yes	Frédéric Laporte	LR	
Moulins	19,664	Pierre-André Périssol	LR	Yes	Pierre-André Périssol	LR	
Néris-les-Bains	2,553	Alain Chapy	DVD	No	Alain Chapy	DVD	
Prémilhat	2,458	Bernard Pozzoli	PS	No	Bernard Pozzoli	PS	
Saint-Germain-des-Fossés	3,656	Élisabeth Albert-Cuisset	DVD	No	Élisabeth Albert-Cuisset	DVD	
Saint-Pourçain-sur-Sioule	5,160	Emmanuel Ferrand	LR	No	Emmanuel Ferrand	LR	
Saint-Victor	2,098	Jean-Pierre Guérin	DVD	No	Jean-Pierre Guérin	DVD	
Saint-Yorre	2,561	Joseph Kuchna	PCF	No	Joseph Kuchna	PCF	
Varennes-sur-Allier	3,561	Roger Litaudon	DVD	No	Roger Litaudon	DVD	
Vendat	2,216	Jean-Marc Germanangue	DVD	No	Jean-Marc Germanangue	DVD	
Vichy	24,166	Frédéric Aguilera	LR	No	Frédéric Aguilera	LR	
Yzeure	13,088	Pascal Perrin	PS	No	Pascal Perrin	PS	

=== Results by number of mayors elected ===
Change in number of elected mayors by political party
Party	Incumbent mayors	Elected mayors	Change
Miscellaneous right	10	10	Steady
The Republicans	6	5	▼1
Total right	16	5	▼1
Socialist Party	4	5	▲1
French Communist Party	2	3	▲1
Miscellaneous left	4	3	▼1
Radical Party of the Left	1	1	Steady
Total left	11	12	▲1
Total	27		Steady

== Results ==
=== Department wide ===
==== Voter turnout ====
Participation rate in the 2020 Allier municipal elections
Participation rate	First round	Difference from 2014	Second round	Difference from 2014	Difference between the two rounds
At 12h	25.35 %	▼0.67	28.12 %	▲0.28	▲2.77
At 17h	48.03 %	▼6.82	Not counted		
Final	49.98 %	▼18.36	44.57 %	▼26.61	▼5.41

==== General results ====
Departmental results
	Communes with list-based elections (more than 1,000 inhabitants)				Communes with majority-vote elections (less than 1,000 inhabitants)				All communes			
	First round		Second round		First round		Second round		First round		Second round	
	Votes	%	Votes	%	Votes	%	Votes	%	Votes	%	Votes	%
Valid votes	73,681	94.39	16,410	97.09	45,038	96.67	4,229	95.70	118,719	95.24	20,639	96.80
White votes	1,393	1.78	233	1.38	432	0.93	102	2.31	1,825	1.46	335	1.57
Rejected votes	2,990	3.83	259	1.53	1,121	2.41	88	1.99	4,111	3.30	347	1.63
Total	78,064	100	16,902	100	46,591	100	4,419	100	124,655	100	21,321	100
Abstentions	94,610	54.79	23,449	58.11	30,159	39.30	3,063	40.94	124,769	50.02	26,512	55.43
Registered voters - voter turnout	172,674	45.21	40351	41.89	76,750	60.70	7,482	59.06	249,424	49.98	47,833	44.57

==== Communes with more than 1,000 inhabitants ====
Departmental summary by electoral list results for the 2020 municipal elections in municipalities with more than 1,000 inhabitants
Electoral list		First round			Second round			Total seats		+/-
Electoral list		Votes	%	Seats (municipal council)	Votes	%	Seats (municipal council)	#	%	+/-
Miscellaneous right	DVD	10,614	14.41	131	3,671	22.37	10	141	10.63	▼462
The Republicans	LR	9,781	13.27	53	4,961	30.23	51	104	7.84	▲104
Miscellaneous left	DVG	9,696	13.16	91	3,589	21.87	8	99	7.47	▼281
Socialist Party	PS	5,182	7.03	57	0	0.00	0	57	4.30	▼28
Union of the Left	UG	2,026	2.75	3	1,008	6.14	3	6	0.45	▼62
Extreme left	EXG	1,084	1.47	2	0	0.00	0	2	0.15	▲2
Union of Democrats and Independents	UDI	1,047	1.42	7	0	0.00	0	7	0.53	▲4
French Communist Party	PCF	623	0.85	3	0	0.00	0	3	0.23	▼15
National Rally	RN	560	0.76	1	0	0.00	0	1	0.08	▼2
Miscellaneous centre	DVC	528	0.72	2	0	0.00	0	2	0.15	New
Independent	DIV	423	0.57	2	0	0.00	0	2	0.15	▼5
Europe Ecology – The Greens	VEC	381	0.52	2	0	0.00	0	2	0.15	▲2
La République En Marche!	LREM	350	0.48	0	0	0.00	0	0	0.00	New
No label		31,386	42.60	832	3,181	19.38	68	900	67.87	New
Total		73,681	100	1,186	16,410	100	140	1,326	100	▼17

=== Results in communes with more than 3,000 inhabitants ===
==== Abrest ====
- Incumbent mayor: Patrick Montagner (DVD)
- 23 seats to be elected to the conseil municipal (population in 2017: 2,931 residents)
- 2 seats to be elected to the conseil communautaire (CA Vichy Communauté)

2020 Abrest municipal election
Leader	List	First round		Second round		Seats	
Leader	List	Votes	%	Votes	%	CM	CC
Romain Lopez	DVD	526	42.08	716	57.23	18	2
Abrest Dynamique		526	42.08	716	57.23	18	2
Patrick Montagner	DVD	432	34.56	535	42.76	5	0
Continuer d'Agir pour Réussir		432	34.56	535	42.76	5	0
Philippe Basmadjian	DVG	292	23.36	Withdrew			
Abrest Deux Rives		292	23.36	Withdrew			
Valid votes		1,250	97.66	1,251	97.13		
White votes		12	0.94	21	1.63		
Rejected votes		18	1.41	16	1.24		
Total		1,280	100	1,288	100	23	2
Abstentions		958	42.81	960	42.70		
Registered voters - voter turnout		2,238	57.19	2,248	57.30		

==== Avermes ====
- Incumbent mayor: Alain Denizot (PS)
- 27 seats to be elected to the conseil municipal (population in 2017: 3,966 residents)
- 4 seats to be elected to the conseil communautaire (CA Moulins Communauté)

2020 Avermes municipal election
Leader	List	First round		Seats	
Leader	List	Votes	%	CM	CC
Alain Denizot	PS-PCF-EELV	953	75.81	24	4
Avec Vous pour l'Avenir		953	75.81	24	4
Alain Didtsch	DVD	304	24.18	3	0
Vivons Avermes		304	24.18	3	0
Valid votes		1,257	96.03		
White votes		18	1.38		
Rejected votes		34	2.60		
Total		1,309	100	27	4
Abstentions		1,765	57.42		
Registered voters - voter turnout		3,074	42.58		

==== Bellerive-sur-Allier ====
- Incumbent mayor: François Sennepin (DVD)
- 29 seats to be elected to the conseil municipal (population in 2017: 8,500 residents)
- 6 seats to be elected to the conseil communautaire (CA Vichy Communauté)

2020 Bellerive-sur-Allier municipal election
Leader	List	First round		Seats	
Leader	List	Votes	%	CM	CC
François Sennepin	DVD-LR	1,409	56.24	24	6
Bellerive attractive		1,409	56.24	24	6
Guillaume Desmoules	PS-PCF	458	18.28	2	0
Bellerive autrement		458	18.28	2	0
Bruno Bonjean	EELV	381	15.20	2	0
Naturellement Bellerive		381	15.20	2	0
Grégory Chambon	DVD	257	10.25	1	0
Bellerivez-vous		257	10.25	1	0
Valid votes		2,505	96.94		
White votes		32	1.24		
Rejected votes		47	1.82		
Total		2,584	100	29	6
Abstentions		3,451	57.18		
Registered voters - voter turnout		6,035	42.82		

==== Bourbon-l'Archambault ====
- Incumbent mayor: Anne Leclercq (DVD)
- 23 seats to be elected to the conseil municipal (population in 2017: 2,559 residents)
- 8 seats to be elected to the conseil communautaire (CC du Bocage Bourbonnais)

2020 Bourbon-l'Archambault municipal election
Leader	List	First round		Seats	
Leader	List	Votes	%	CM	CC
Jacky Belien	PCF	773	68.46	20	7
Ensemble pour Bourbon		773	68.46	20	7
Annick Leclercq	DVD	356	31.53	3	1
Bourbon Demain avec vous vers l'Avenir		356	31.53	3	1
Valid votes		1,129	95.52		
White votes		17	1.44		
Rejected votes		36	3.05		
Total		1,182	100	23	8
Abstentions		679	36.49		
Registered voters - voter turnout		1,861	63.51		

==== Commentry ====
- Incumbent mayor: Fernand Spaccaferri (UDI)
- 29 seats to be elected to the conseil municipal (population in 2017: 6,239 residents)
- 12 seats to be elected to the conseil communautaire (CC Commentry Montmarault Néris Communauté)

2020 Commentry municipal election
Leader	List	First round		Seats	
Leader	List	Votes	%	CM	CC
Sylvain Bourdier	PCF-PS-EÉLV	1,124	51.77	22	9
Commentry pour Tous		1,124	51.77	22	9
Fernand Spaccaferri	UDI-LR	1,047	48.22	7	3
Pour Commentry Évidemment!		1,047	48.22	7	3
Valid votes		2,171	95.26		
White votes		34	1.49		
Rejected votes		74	3.25		
Total		2,279	100	29	12
Abstentions		2,425	51.55		
Registered voters - voter turnout		4,704	48.45		

==== Cosne-d'Allier ====
- Incumbent mayor: Martial Sanlias (DVD)
- 19 seats to be elected to the conseil municipal (population in 2017: 2,039 residents)
- 3 seats to be elected to the conseil communautaire (CC Commentry Montmarault Néris Communauté)

2020 Cosne-d'Allier municipal election
Leader	List	First round		Seats	
Leader	List	Votes	%	CM	CC
Marie Carré	DVD	550	62.64	16	2
Ensemble Continuons pour Cosne		550	62.64	16	2
Gilles Bidaud	PCF-PS-EÉLV	328	37.35	3	1
À Gauche pour Cosne et son avenir		328	37.35	3	1
Valid votes		878	94.92		
White votes		17	1.84		
Rejected votes		30	3.24		
Total		925	100	19	3
Abstentions		621	40.17		
Registered voters - voter turnout		1,546	59.83		

==== Creuzier-le-Vieux ====
- Incumbent mayor: Christian Bertin (DVG)
- 23 seats to be elected to the conseil municipal (population in 2017: 3,304 residents)
- 2 seats to be elected to the conseil communautaire (CA Vichy Communauté)

==== Cusset ====
- Incumbent mayor: Jean-Sebastien Laloy (LR)
- 33 seats to be elected to the conseil municipal (population in 2017: 12,661 residents)
- 10 seats to be elected to the conseil communautaire (CA Vichy Communauté)

==== Désertines ====
- Incumbent mayor: Christian Sanvoisin (PCF)
- 27 seats to be elected to the conseil municipal (population in 2017: 4,422 residents)
- 4 seats to be elected to the conseil communautaire (CA Montluçon Communauté)

==== Domérat ====
- Incumbent mayor: Marc Malbet (PS)
- 29 seats to be elected to the conseil municipal (population in 2017: 8,780 residents)
- 8 seats to be elected to the conseil communautaire (CA Montluçon Communauté)

==== Dompierre-sur-Besbre ====
- Incumbent mayor: Pascal Vernisse (DVG)
- 23 seats to be elected to the conseil municipal (population in 2017: 3,040 residents)
- 7 seats to be elected to the conseil communautaire (CC Entr'Allier Besbre et Loire)

==== Gannat ====
- Incumbent mayor: Véronique Pouzadoux (LR)
- 29 seats to be elected to the conseil municipal (population in 2017: 5,832 residents)
- 13 seats to be elected to the conseil communautaire (CC Saint-Pourçain Sioule Limagne)

==== Huriel ====
- Incumbent mayor: Stéphane Abranowitch (DVG)
- 23 seats to be elected to the conseil municipal (population in 2017: 2,646 residents)
- 8 seats to be elected to the conseil communautaire (CC du Pays d'Huriel)

==== Lapalisse ====
- Incumbent mayor: Jacques de Chabannes (PRG)
- 23 seats to be elected to the conseil municipal (population in 2017: 3,123 residents)
- 11 seats to be elected to the conseil communautaire (CC du Pays d'Huriel)

2020 Lapalisse municipal election
Leader	List	First round		Seats	
Leader	List	Votes	%	CM	CC
Jacques de Chabannes	PRG-PS-PCF	677	100	23	11
Continuons à construire l'avenir		677	100	23	11
Valid votes		677	85.70		
White votes		26	3.29		
Rejected votes		87	11.01		
Total		790	100	23	11
Abstentions		1,329	62.72		
Registered voters - voter turnout		2,119	37.28		

==== Lurcy-Lévis ====
- Incumbent mayor: Claude Vanneau (DVD)
- 19 seats to be elected to the conseil municipal (population in 2017: 1,893 residents)
- 2 seats to be elected to the conseil communautaire (CA Moulins Communauté)

==== Montluçon ====
- Incumbent mayor: Frédéric Laporte (LR)
- 39 seats to be elected to the conseil municipal (population in 2017: 35,653 residents)
- 30 seats to be elected to the conseil communautaire (CA Montluçon Communauté)

2020 Montluçon municipal election
Leader	List	First round		Second round		Seats	
Leader	List	Votes	%	Votes	%	CM	CC
Frédéric Laporte	LR	2,212	27.03	2,654	31.45	26	20
Montluçon ensemble liste ouverte		2,212	27.03	2,654	31.45	26	20
Frédéric Kott	PS diss.-PCF	1,597	19.51	2,361	28.10	5	4
Tout pour Montluçon		1,597	19.51	2,361	28.10	5	4
Joseph Roudillon	DVD	1,737	21.22	2,194	26.00	5	4
Pour Montluçon, Changeons la donne		1,737	21.22	2,194	26.00	5	4
Sylvie Sartirano	MR-LREM-DVD	1,257	15.36	1,218	14.43	3	2
Montluçon dès Demain		1,257	15.36	1,218	14.43	3	2
Stéphanie Charret	FI	544	6.64	Eliminated in first round			
En 2020 tournons la page		544	6.64	Eliminated in first round			
Jean-François Jarrige	LREM	350	4.27	Eliminated in first round			
Ensemble vers le Grand Montluçon		350	4.27	Eliminated in first round			
Mathieu Bogros	PS	345	4.21	Eliminated in first round			
Réinventons Montluçon		345	4.21	Eliminated in first round			
Jean-François Reul	LO	141	1.72	Eliminated in first round			
Lutte Ouvrière - Faire entendre le camp des travailleurs		141	1.72	Eliminated in first round			
Valid votes		8,183	95.15	8,437	96.56		
White votes		116	1.35	136	1.56		
Rejected votes		301	3.50	165	1.89		
Total		8,600	100	8,738	100	39	30
Abstentions		13,951	61.86	13,189	61.26		
Registered voters - voter turnout		22,551	38.14	22,557	38.74		

==== Moulins ====
- Incumbent mayor: Pierre-André Périssol (LR)
- 33 seats to be elected to the conseil municipal (population in 2017: 19,664 residents)
- 20 seats to be elected to the conseil communautaire (CA Moulins Communauté)

==== Néris-les-Bains ====
- Incumbent mayor: Alain Chapy (DVD)
- 23 seats to be elected to the conseil municipal (population in 2017: 2,553 residents)
- 5 seats to be elected to the conseil communautaire (CC Commentry Montmarault Néris Communauté)

==== Prémilhat ====
- Incumbent mayor: Bernard Pozzoli (PS)
- 19 seats to be elected to the conseil municipal (population in 2017: 2,458 residents)
- 2 seats to be elected to the conseil communautaire (CA Montluçon Communauté)

2020 Prémilhat municipal election
Leader	List	First round		Seats	
Leader	List	Votes	%	CM	CC
Bernard Pozzoli	PS	644	100	19	2
Prémilhat Toujours		644	100	19	2
Valid votes		644	92.13		
White votes		20	2.86		
Rejected votes		35	5.01		
Total		699	100	19	2
Abstentions		1,162	62.44		
Registered voters - voter turnout		1,861	37.56		

==== Saint-Germain-des-Fossés ====
- Incumbent mayor: Élisabeth Albert-Cuisset (DVD)
- 27 seats to be elected to the conseil municipal (population in 2017: 3,656 residents)
- 3 seats to be elected to the conseil communautaire (CA Vichy Communauté)

==== Saint-Pourçain-sur-Sioule ====
- Incumbent mayor: Emmanyek Ferrand (LR)
- 29 seats to be elected to the conseil municipal (population in 2017: 5,160 residents)
- 11 seats to be elected to the conseil communautaire (CC Saint-Pourçain Sioule Limagne)

==== Saint-Victor ====
- Incumbent mayor: Jean-Pierre Guérin (DVD)
- 19 seats to be elected to the conseil municipal (population in 2017: 2,098 residents)
- 2 seats to be elected to the conseil communautaire (CA Montluçon Communauté)

2020 Saint-Victor municipal election
Leader	List	First round		Seats	
Leader	List	Votes	%	CM	CC
Jean-Pierre Guérin	DVD	687	100	19	2
Union pour la Défense des Intérêts de Saint-Victor		687	100	19	2
Valid votes		687	91.60		
White votes		24	3.20		
Rejected votes		39	5.20		
Total		750	100	19	2
Abstentions		874	53.82		
Registered voters - voter turnout		1,624	46.18		

==== Saint-Yorre ====
- Incumbent mayor: Joseph Kuchna (PCF)
- 23 seats to be elected to the conseil municipal (population in 2017: 2,561 residents)
- 2 seats to be elected to the conseil communautaire (CA Vichy Communauté)

==== Varennes-sur-Allier ====
- Incumbent mayor: Roger Litaudon (DVD)
- 27 seats to be elected to the conseil municipal (population in 2017: 3,561 residents)
- 8 seats to be elected to the conseil communautaire (CC Entr'Allier Besbre et Loire)

2020 Varennes-sur-Allier municipal election
Leader	List	First round		Seats	
Leader	List	Votes	%	CM	CC
Roger Litaudon	DVD	781	100	27	8
Unis pour Varennes		781	100	27	8
Valid votes		781	78.89		
White votes		87	8.79		
Rejected votes		122	12.32		
Total		990	100	27	8
Abstentions		1,670	62.78		
Registered voters - voter turnout		2,660	37.22		

==== Vendat ====
- Incumbent mayor: Jean-Marc Germanangue (DVD)
- 19 seats to be elected to the conseil municipal (population in 2017: 2,216 residents)
- 1 seats to be elected to the conseil communautaire (CA Vichy Communauté)

2020 Vendat municipal election
Leader	List	First round		Seats	
Leader	List	Votes	%	CM	CC
Jean-Marc Germanangue	DVD	558	100	19	1
Ensemble pour Vendat		558	100	19	1
Valid votes		558	81.82		
White votes		63	9.24		
Rejected votes		61	8.94		
Total		682	100	19	1
Abstentions		1,140	62.57		
Registered voters - voter turnout		1,822	37.43		

==== Vichy ====
- Incumbent mayor: Frédéric Aguilera (LR)
- 35 seats to be elected to the conseil municipal (population in 2017: 24,166 residents)
- 20 seats to be elected to the conseil communautaire (CA Vichy Communauté)

2020 Vichy municipal election
Leader	List	First round		Seats	
Leader	List	Votes	%	CM	CC
Frédéric Aguilera	LR-LREM	4,356	74.10	31	18
Vichy Passionnément		4,356	74.10	31	18
Isabelle Réchard	PRG-EÉLV-PCF-PS	962	16.36	3	1
Vichy c'est vous		962	16.36	3	1
Jean-Pierre Sigaud	RN	560	9.52	1	1
Vichy Bleu Marine		560	9.52	1	1
Valid votes		5,878	9.52		
White votes		44	0.72		
Rejected votes		161	2.65		
Total		6,083	100	35	20
Abstentions		11,315	65.04		
Registered voters - voter turnout		17,398	34.96		

==== Yzeure ====
- Incumbent mayor: Pascal Perrin (PS)
- 33 seats to be elected to the conseil municipal (population in 2017: 13,088 residents)
- 13 seats to be elected to the conseil communautaire (CA Moulins Communauté)

== See also ==
- 2020 French municipal elections
  - 2020 Ain municipal elections
  - 2020 Bas-Rhin municipal elections
  - 2020 Caen municipal election
  - 2020 Paris municipal election
