= Alain Borne =

French poet

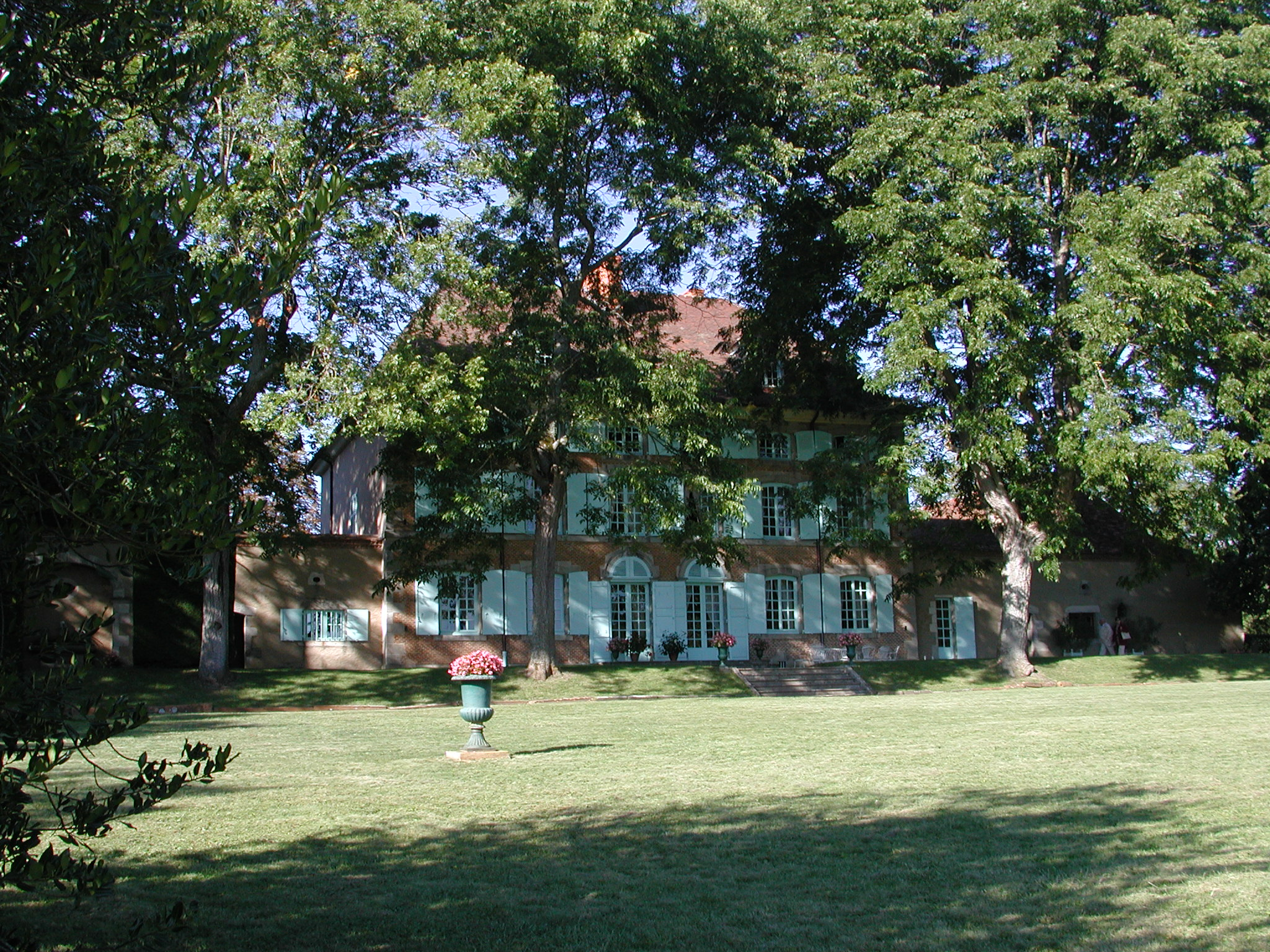
- Château de Saint-Pont. Façade sur le parc
- Born: 12 January 1915; Saint-Pont (Allier)
- Died: 21 December 1962 (aged 47); Lapalud (Vaucluse),
- Occupation: Poet

Alain Borne (French pronunciation: [alɛ̃ bɔʁn]; 12 January 1915 – 21 December 1962) was a 20th-century French poet. A lawyer in Montélimar, he lived relatively unknown to the literary circles in Paris. But he was very close to Pierre Seghers.

Borne was killed in a car accident about fifty kilometers north of Avignon. Half of his work has since been published.

== Works ==
- 1939: Cicatrices de Songes, Feuillets de l'îlot (Prix du Goéland 1939)
- 1941: Neige et 20 Poèmes, éditions Seghers
- 1942: Contre-feu, Cahiers du Rhône
- 1943: Seuils, École de Rochefort
- 1945: Brefs, Confluences
- 1945: Regardez mes mains vides, PAB Pierre-André Benoit
- 1945: Terre de l'été, Robert Laffont
- 1946: Poèmes à Lislei, Seghers
- 1947: L'Eau Fine, Éditions Gallimard
- 1951: O P. 10, PAB Pierre-André Benoit
- 1953: En une seule injure, Éditions Rougerie (Prix Antonin-Artaud (1954)
- 1953: Orties, Henneuse
- 1954: Demain la nuit sera parfaite, Rougerie
- 1955: Treize, PAB Pierre-André Benoit
- 1957: Adresses au vent, translated into Italian by G. A. Brunelli, Capitoli
- 1959: Encore, Rougerie
- 1961: Encres, Club du poème

Posthumous

- 1962: L'amour brûle le circuit, Club du poème
- 1963: La Dernière Ligne, Club du poème
- 1964: La nuit me parle de toi, Rougerie
- 1964: Célébration du hareng, (prose) Robert Morel
- 1965: Les fêtes sont fanées followed by La dernière ligne, Club du poème
- 1969: Encres, édition définitive, Club du poème
- 1969: Vive la mort, Guy Chambelland
- 1969: Le Facteur Cheval, (prose) éditions Robert Morel, photographs by Henriette Grindat
- 1971: Indociles, Club du poème
- 1971: Le Plus Doux Poignard, Chambelland
- 1974: Complaintes, Saint-Germain-des-Prés
- 1980: Œuvres poétiques complètes, tome 1, Curandera
- 1981: Œuvres poétiques complètes, tome 2, Curandera
- 1991: Textes inédits, prose et correspondance, magazine Voix d'encre n° 3/4
- 1992: Seul avec la beauté, (first anthology of unpublished poems), éditions Voix d'encre
- 1994: L'amour, la vie, la mort, (Second anthology of unpublished poems), éditions Voix d'encre
- 1999: Poèmes inédits, magazine Voix d'encre, n° 20
- 2000: La marquise sortit à 5 heures, (short stories), éditions Voix d'encre
- 2001: Terre de l'été followed by Poèmes à Lislei, Éditions Editinter, reprint
- 2001: En passant par le lycée... Alain Borne, lycée Alain Borne
- 2001: Un brasier de mots, poems compiled by Alain Blanc, éditions Voix d'encre
- 2002: L'eau fine followed by En une seule injure, Éditions Editinter, reprint
- 2002: célébration du hareng, poésie/première 22, reprint
- 2002: Encres, Atelier du Hanneton, reprint
- 2003: Poèmes d'amour, (anthology) Le Cherche midi
- 2006: la nuit me parle de toi, Trident neuf, reprint
- 2008: Treize followed by Indociles, éditions Fondencre, reprint
- 2014: L'iris marchait de son odeur, unpublished proses and poems compiled by Alain Blanc, éditions Voix d'encre
- 2015: L'amour brûle le circuit, Encres, Les fêtes sont fanées, La dernière ligne followed by extracts of his diary, éditions Fondencre, reprint
- 2016: Brefs, followed by Orties and Adresses au vent, éditions Voix d'encre, reprint
- 2016: Seuils, followed by Regardez mes mains vides, Op. 10 and Treize, éditions Voix d'encre, reprint

== Bibliography ==
- René Varennes, 175 poètes bourbonnais, Moulins, 1988.
- Christophe Dauphin, « Alain Borne, c'est contre la mort que j'écris, 1915-2015 : le centenaire du grand solitaire », Les Hommes sans épaules, n° 39, 2015.
- Max Alhau, Présence d'Alain Borne, followed by Alain Blanc, Alain Borne ou la passion lucide, éditions Voix d'encre, 2015.
- Maurice Sarazin, Les Bourbonnais célèbres et remarquables, des origines à la fin du XXe siècle. Dictionnaire de biographie bourbonnaise, t. I, Arrondissement de Vichy, Charroux, Éditions des Cahiers bourbonnais, 2009.
- Louise Tixier, Saint-Pont, miettes d'histoire, Montluçon, 1968.
