= Dominique Kalifa =

French historian (1957-2020)

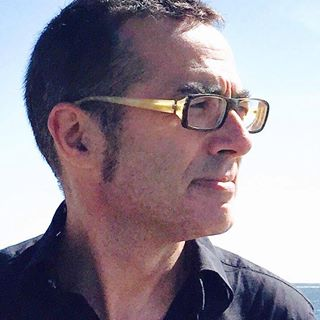
- Kalifa in 2017
- Born: 12 September 1957; Vichy, France
- Died: 12 September 2020 (aged 63); Brugheas, Vichy, France
- Other name: Dominique Prosper Kalifa
- Occupations: Professor, columnist & French historian
- Known for: History of crime, transgression, social control, and mass culture

Dominique Kalifa (12 September 1957 – 12 September 2020) was a French historian, columnist and professor.

== Early life ==
Kalifa was born in Vichy and attended the local École normale supérieure at Saint-Cloud.

Under the supervision of Michelle Perrot, he undertook postgraduate research and received his doctorate in 1994.

== Career ==
Kalifa was professor at the University of Paris 1 Pantheon-Sorbonne and director of the Centre of 19th Century History, and a member of the Institut universitaire de France. He also taught at the Institut d'études politiques de Paris (Sciences Po) from 2008 to 2015, and was several times visiting scholar at New York University, Brigham Young University and the University of St Andrews.

A student of Michelle Perrot, he specialised in the history of crime, transgression, social control, and mass culture in 19th and early 20th century France and Europe.

From 1990, he was also columnist (historical reviews) for the French newspaper Libération. His study about the underworld and its role in the Western imagination is now translated into Portuguese (EDUSP), Spanish (Instituto Mora) and forthcoming in English (Columbia University Press).

His Véritable Histoire de la Belle Epoque, published in 2017, won the Eugène Colas Prize from the Académie française.

He also worked on a project about love, Paris and the topographical imagination. He has been described as a specialist in the bas fonds and social imagination.

== Selected works ==
- L'Encre et le Sang. Récits de crimes et société à la Belle Époque, Fayard, Paris, 1995.
- Naissance de la police privée, Plon, Paris, 2000.
- La Culture de masse en France, tome 1 1860–1930, La Découverte, Paris, 2001.
- Vidal le tueur de femmes. Une biographie sociale (with Philippe Artières), Perrin, Paris, 2001.
- Imaginaire et sensibilités au xix^{e} siècle (with Anne-Emmanuelle Demartini), Creaphis, Paris, 2005.
- Crime et culture au xix^{e} siècle, Perrin, Paris, 2005.
- L'Enquête judiciaire en Europe au xix^{e} siècle (ed), Creaphis, Paris, 2007.
- Le Commissaire de police au xix^{e} siècle (ed), Publications de la Sorbonne, 2008.
- Crimen y cultura de masas en Francia, siglos XIX-XX, Instituto Mora, Mexico, 2008.
- Biribi. Les bagnes coloniaux de l'armée française, Paris, Perrin, 2009.
- La Civilisation du journal. Histoire culturelle et littéraire de la presse au XIX^{e} siècle (ed), Nouveau Monde, Paris, 2011.
- Les bas-fonds. Histoire d'un imaginaire, Seuil, Paris, 2013.
- Atlas du crime à Paris, du Moyen Age à nos jours (with J.-C. Farcy), Paris, Parigramme, 2015.
- La Véritable histoire de la Belle Époque, Paris, Fayard, 2017.
- Tu entreras dans le siècle en lisant Fantômas, Paris, Vendémiaire, 2017.
- Paris. Une histoire érotique d'Offenbach aux sixties, Paris, Payot, 2018.

In English : "Crime Scenes: Criminal Topography and Social Imaginary in Nineteenth Century Paris", French Historical Studies, vol. 27, n° 1, 2004, p. 175-194; "Criminal Investigators at the Fin-de-siècle", Yale French Studies, n° 108, 2005, p. 36-47; "What is now cultural history about?", in Robert Gildea and Anne Simonin (eds), Writing Contemporary History, London, Hodder Education, 2008, p. 47-56; « The Press », in E. Berenson, V. Duclert & C. Prochasson (eds), The French Republic. History, Values, Debates, Ithaca, Cornell University Press, 2011, p. 189-196; "Minotaur", Journal of Modern History, vol. 84, n° 4, 2012, p. 980-982; "Naming the Century: Chrononyms of the 19th Century", Revue d'histoire du XIX^{e} siècle, n° 52, 2016; "An Informal History of Herbert Asbury's Underworld", Medias19, 2018; Vice, Crime, and Poverty. How the Western Imagination Invented the Underworld, Columbia University Press, 2019.

== Filmography ==
- Co-author with Mathilde Damoisel of the film Romantic Paris, Erotic Paris, France Television, 2021
- Co-author with Hugues Nancy of the film A beautiful era: France before 14, CP&B/France 3, 2019
- Management (with E. Blanchard) of the series Faits divers : l'histoire à la Une broadcast on Arte, 2017
- Columnist in Casque d'or et les Apaches (1902), a 52 min episode of the television documentary series Des crimes almost parfaits directed by Patrick Schmidt and Pauline Verdu, Planète+ CI, 2015
- Arsène, 55 min documentary directed by Lucien Dirat and Nathan Miler, La Sept Arte, FRP, 2000
- In the Belle Epoque of bad boys, 52 min documentary directed by Nicolas Lévy-Beff
- Les Enfants du prison, 52 min documentary directed by Nicolas Lévy-Beff
- Miscellaneous facts? Cézanne and the murder, interview with Dominique Kalifa and Philippe Comar, exhibition "Cézanne et Paris" presented at the Musée du Luxembourg, 2011-2012

== Death ==
Kalifa died by suicide in Brugheas, his home town, at the age of 63; in the afternoon, as per the Libération's report.
