= Canton of Bellerive-sur-Allier =

Coordinates: 46.11°N 3.39°E

- Canton
- Situation of the canton of Bellerive-sur-Allier in the department of Allier
- Country: France
- Region: Auvergne-Rhône-Alpes
- Department: Allier
- No. of communes: {{{nbcomm}}}
- Population (2023): 19,649
- INSEE code: 0301

The canton of Bellerive-sur-Allier is an administrative division of the Allier department, in central France. It was created at the French canton reorganisation which came into effect in March 2015. Its seat is in Bellerive-sur-Allier.

It consists of the following communes:

1. Bellerive-sur-Allier
2. Broût-Vernet
3. Brugheas
4. Cognat-Lyonne
5. Escurolles
6. Espinasse-Vozelle
7. Hauterive
8. Saint-Didier-la-Forêt
9. Saint-Pont
10. Serbannes
11. Vendat
