= Vaux, Allier =

Vaux
- Commune
- Location of Vaux
- Location within France Location within Auvergne-Rhône-Alpes
- Coordinates: 46°25′39″N 2°35′53″E
- Country: France
- Region: Auvergne-Rhône-Alpes
- Department: Allier
- Arrondissement: Montluçon
- Canton: Montluçon-1
- Intercommunality: Val de Cher

Government
  - Mayor (2026–32): Jérôme Duchalet
- Area^{1}: 18.1 km^{2} (7.0 sq mi)
- Elevation: 220 m (720 ft)
- Highest elevation: 247 m (810 ft)
- Lowest elevation: 178 m (584 ft)
- Population (2023): 1,165
  - Density: 64.4/km^{2} (167/sq mi)
- Time zone: UTC+01:00 (CET)
  - Summer (DST): UTC+02:00 (CEST)
- INSEE/Postal code: 03301 /03190
- ^{1} French Land Register data, which excludes lakes, ponds, glaciers > 1 km^{2} (0.386 sq mi or 247 acres) and river estuaries.

Vaux (French pronunciation: [vo]; Occitan: Vaus) is a commune in the Allier department in Auvergne-Rhône-Alpes in central France. The 19th-century French journalist, chansonnier and politician Agénor Altaroche (1811–1884) died in Vaux.

== Population ==
Historical population
Year	Pop.	±% p.a.
1968	772	—
1975	701	−1.37%
1982	820	+2.27%
1990	905	+1.24%
1999	966	+0.73%
2007	983	+0.22%
2012	1,068	+1.67%
2017	1,121	+0.97%
2023	1,165	+0.64%
Source: INSEE

== See also ==
- Communes of the Allier department
