= Saint-Victor, Allier =

Saint-Victor
- Commune
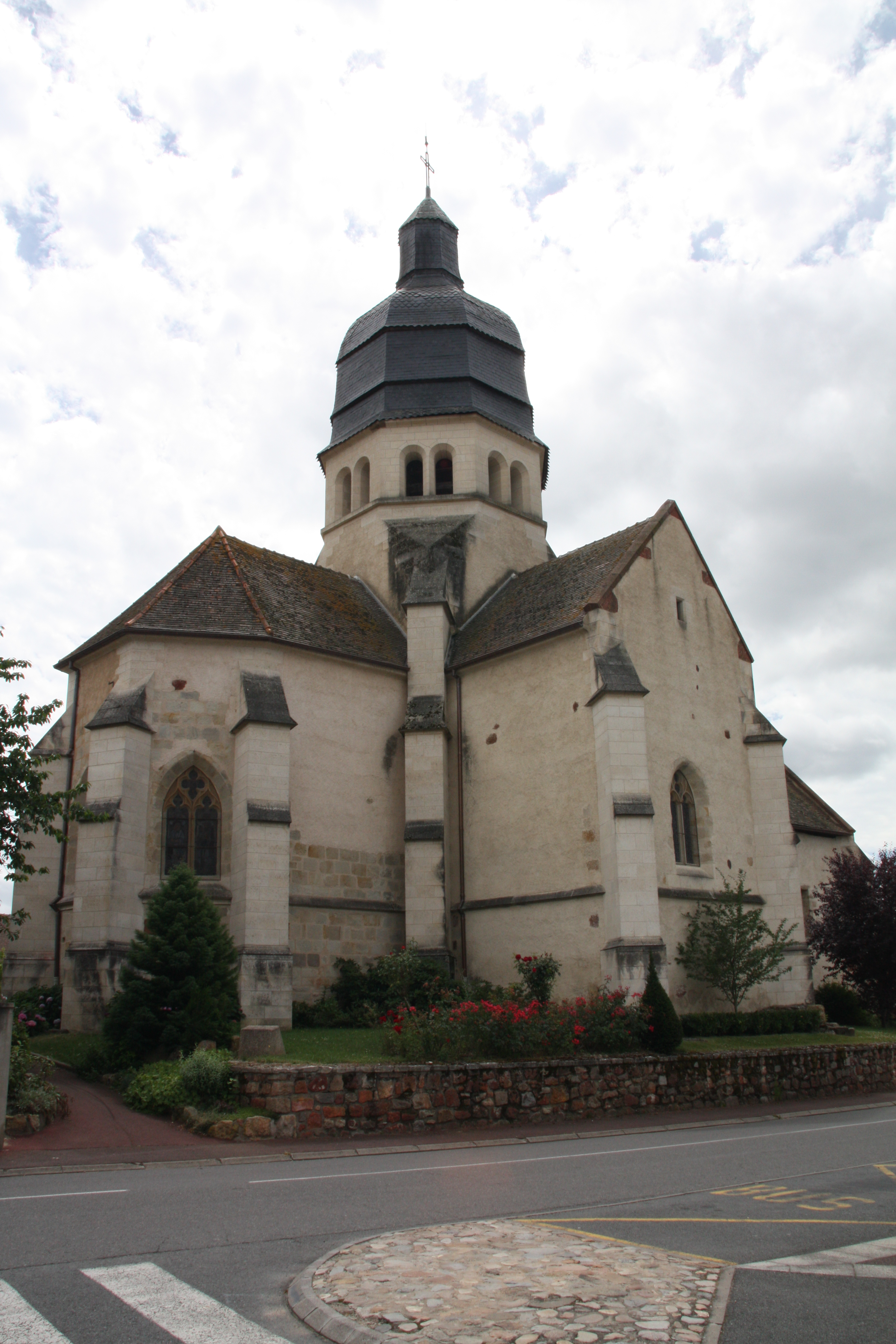
- The church in Saint-Victor
- Location of Saint-Victor
- Location within France Location within Auvergne-Rhône-Alpes
- Coordinates: 46°23′44″N 2°36′32″E
- Country: France
- Region: Auvergne-Rhône-Alpes
- Department: Allier
- Arrondissement: Montluçon
- Canton: Montluçon-1
- Intercommunality: CA Montluçon Communauté

Government
  - Mayor (2026–32): Patrick Braud
- Area^{1}: 23.22 km^{2} (8.97 sq mi)
- Elevation: 212 m (696 ft)
- Highest elevation: 372 m (1,220 ft)
- Lowest elevation: 187 m (614 ft)
- Population (2023): 2,100
  - Density: 90/km^{2} (230/sq mi)
- Time zone: UTC+01:00 (CET)
  - Summer (DST): UTC+02:00 (CEST)
- INSEE/Postal code: 03262 /03410
- ^{1} French Land Register data, which excludes lakes, ponds, glaciers > 1 km^{2} (0.386 sq mi or 247 acres) and river estuaries.

Saint-Victor (French pronunciation: [sɛ̃ viktɔʁ]; Occitan: Sant Victor) is a commune in the Allier department in Auvergne-Rhône-Alpes in central France.

== Population ==
Historical population
Year	Pop.	±% p.a.
1968	1,071	—
1975	1,047	−0.32%
1982	1,332	+3.50%
1990	1,752	+3.49%
1999	1,957	+1.24%
2007	2,012	+0.35%
2012	2,075	+0.62%
2017	2,098	+0.22%
2023	2,100	+0.02%
Source: INSEE

== Sights ==
- Château de Passat
- Saint Victor church, 13th century, entirely restored
- Château de Thizon

== See also ==
- Communes of the Allier department
