= Broût-Vernet =

- Commune
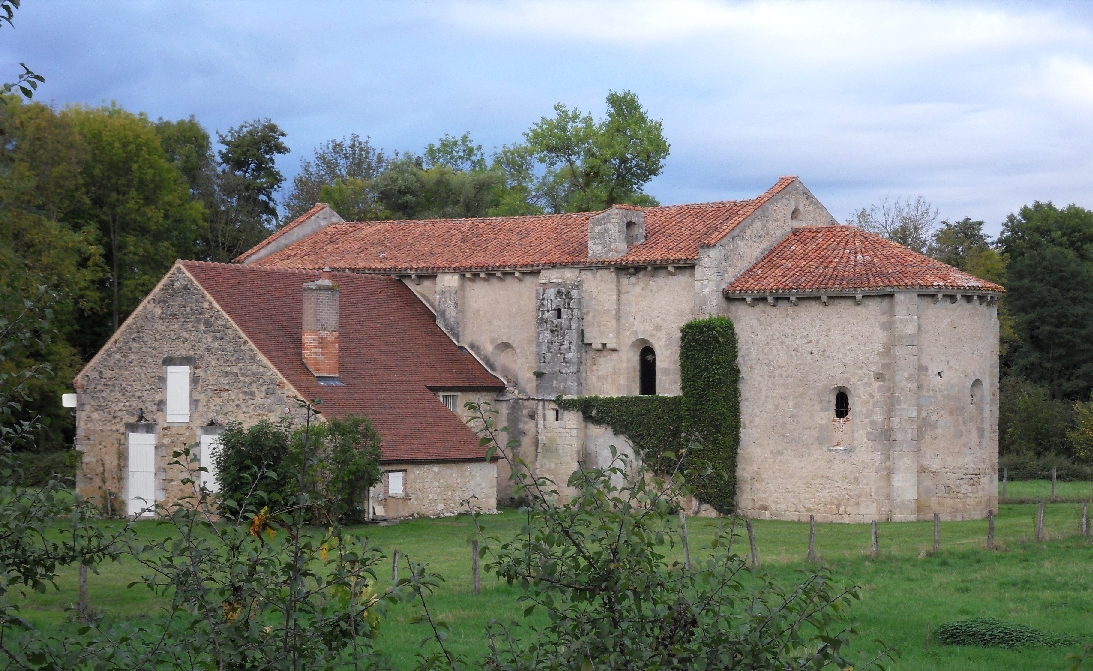
- Aubeterre priory

- Coat of arms
- Location of Broût-Vernet
- Location within France Location within Auvergne-Rhône-Alpes
- Coordinates: 46°11′20″N 3°16′26″E
- Country: France
- Region: Auvergne-Rhône-Alpes
- Department: Allier
- Arrondissement: Vichy
- Canton: Bellerive-sur-Allier

Government
  - Mayor (2026–32): Bernard Devoucoux
- Area^{1}: 31.71 km^{2} (12.24 sq mi)
- Elevation: 310 m (1,020 ft)
- Highest elevation: 331 m (1,086 ft)
- Lowest elevation: 253 m (830 ft)
- Population (2023): 1,217
  - Density: 38.38/km^{2} (99.40/sq mi)
- Time zone: UTC+01:00 (CET)
  - Summer (DST): UTC+02:00 (CEST)
- INSEE/Postal code: 03043 /03110
- ^{1} French Land Register data, which excludes lakes, ponds, glaciers > 1 km^{2} (0.386 sq mi or 247 acres) and river estuaries.

Broût-Vernet (French pronunciation: [bʁu vɛʁnɛ]; Occitan: Brot e Le Vernet) is a commune in the Allier department in central France. It is around 15 km north-west of Vichy and 40 km north of Clermont-Ferrand.

== Population ==
Historical population
Year	Pop.	±% p.a.
1968	1,061	—
1975	994	−0.93%
1982	1,048	+0.76%
1990	1,035	−0.16%
1999	1,068	+0.35%
2007	1,159	+1.03%
2012	1,187	+0.48%
2017	1,169	−0.31%
2023	1,217	+0.67%
Source: INSEE

== See also ==
- Communes of the Allier department
