= Saint-Pont =

- Commune
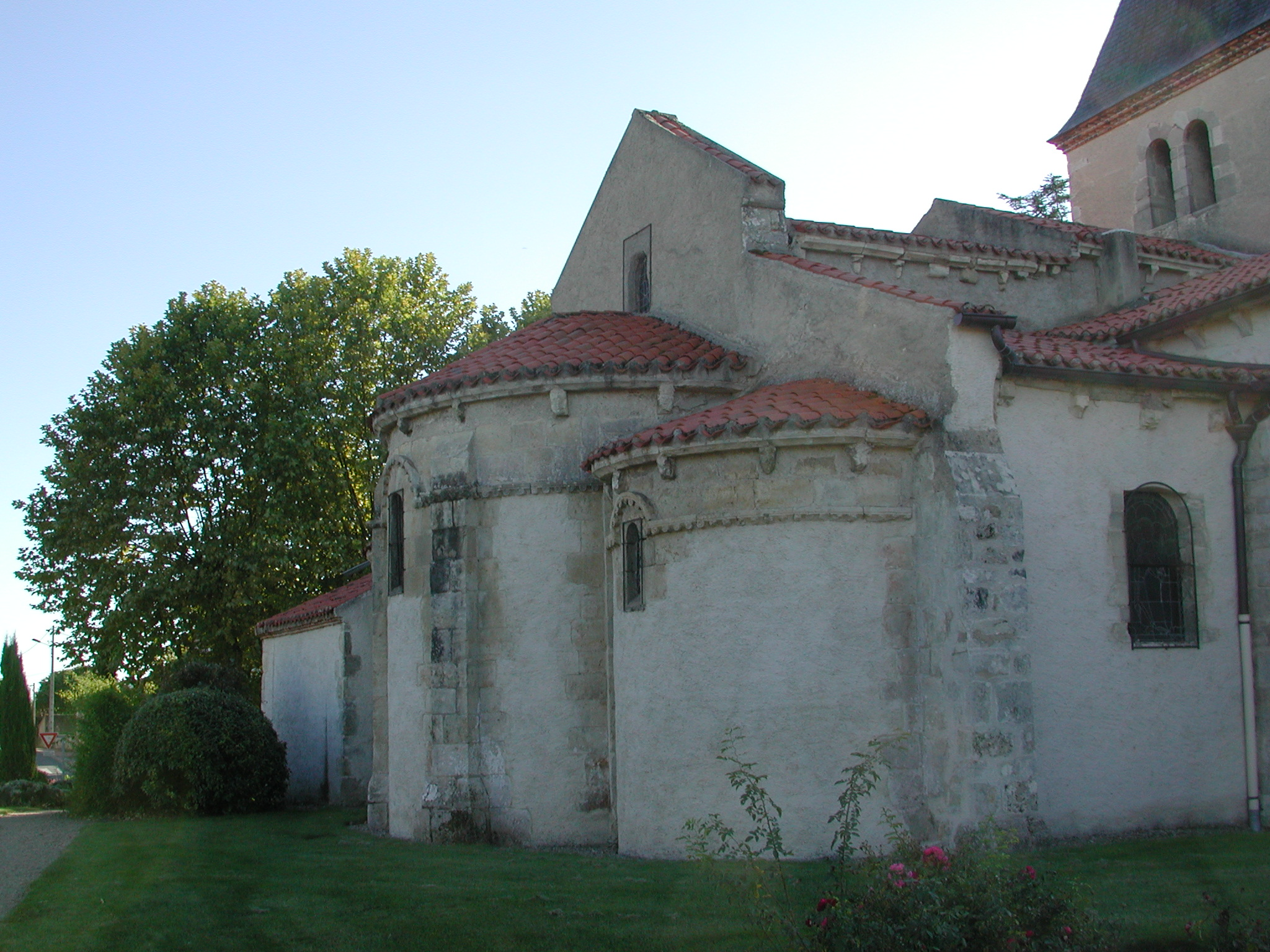
- The church in Saint-Pont

- Coat of arms
- Location of Saint-Pont
- Location within France Location within Auvergne-Rhône-Alpes
- Coordinates: 46°09′54″N 3°17′53″E
- Country: France
- Region: Auvergne-Rhône-Alpes
- Department: Allier
- Arrondissement: Vichy
- Canton: Bellerive-sur-Allier
- Intercommunality: CA Vichy Communauté

Government
  - Mayor (2026–32): Caroline Bardot
- Area^{1}: 12.31 km^{2} (4.75 sq mi)
- Elevation: 330 m (1,080 ft)
- Highest elevation: 343 m (1,125 ft)
- Lowest elevation: 287 m (942 ft)
- Population (2023): 689
  - Density: 56.0/km^{2} (145/sq mi)
- Time zone: UTC+01:00 (CET)
  - Summer (DST): UTC+02:00 (CEST)
- INSEE/Postal code: 03252 /03110
- ^{1} French Land Register data, which excludes lakes, ponds, glaciers > 1 km^{2} (0.386 sq mi or 247 acres) and river estuaries.

Saint-Pont (French pronunciation: [sɛ̃ pɔ̃]; Occitan: Sant Pont) is a commune in the Allier department in Auvergne-Rhône-Alpes in central France. The poet Alain Borne (1915–1962), winner of the 1954 Prix Antonin-Artaud was born in Saint-Pont.

== Population ==
Historical population
Year	Pop.	±% p.a.
1968	408	—
1975	387	−0.75%
1982	412	+0.90%
1990	435	+0.68%
1999	449	+0.35%
2007	526	+2.00%
2012	603	+2.77%
2017	656	+1.70%
2023	689	+0.82%
Source: INSEE

== See also ==
- Communes of the Allier department
