= Hauterive, Allier =

Hauterive
- Commune
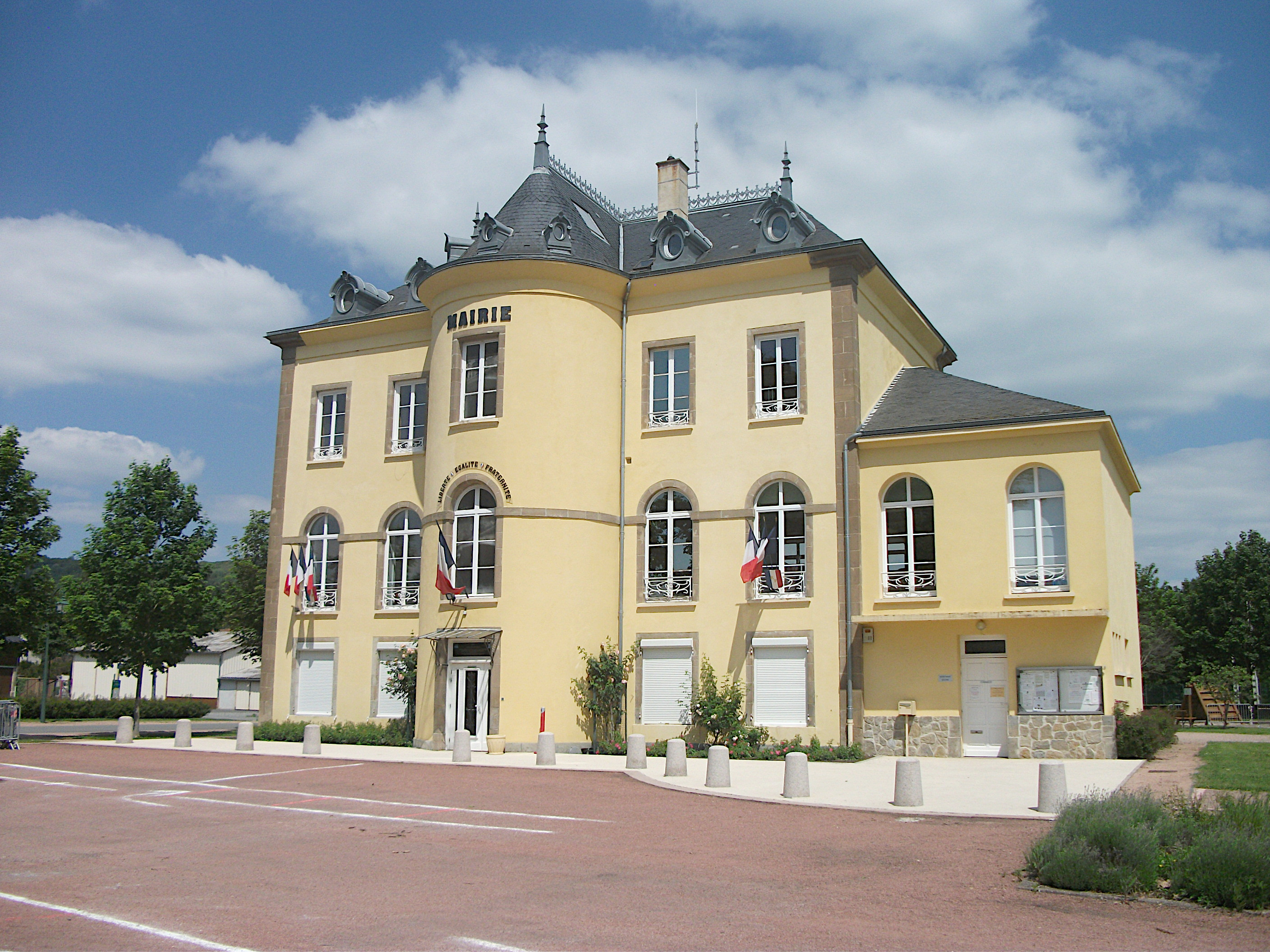
- Town hall
- Location of Hauterive
- Location within France Location within Auvergne-Rhône-Alpes
- Coordinates: 46°05′21″N 3°26′49″E
- Country: France
- Region: Auvergne-Rhône-Alpes
- Department: Allier
- Arrondissement: Vichy
- Canton: Bellerive-sur-Allier
- Intercommunality: CA Vichy Communauté

Government
  - Mayor (2026–32): Romain Champion
- Area^{1}: 8.08 km^{2} (3.12 sq mi)
- Elevation: 265 m (869 ft)
- Highest elevation: 305 m (1,001 ft)
- Lowest elevation: 252 m (827 ft)
- Population (2023): 1,186
  - Density: 147/km^{2} (380/sq mi)
- Time zone: UTC+01:00 (CET)
  - Summer (DST): UTC+02:00 (CEST)
- INSEE/Postal code: 03126 /03270
- ^{1} French Land Register data, which excludes lakes, ponds, glaciers > 1 km^{2} (0.386 sq mi or 247 acres) and river estuaries.

Hauterive (French pronunciation: [otʁiv]; Occitan: Autariba) is a commune in the Allier department in central France.

== Population ==
Historical population
Year	Pop.	±% p.a.
1968	775	—
1975	882	+1.86%
1982	958	+1.19%
1990	1,077	+1.47%
1999	1,055	−0.23%
2007	1,082	+0.32%
2012	1,198	+2.06%
2017	1,169	−0.49%
2023	1,186	+0.24%
Source: INSEE

== See also ==
- Communes of the Allier department
