= Henriette Grindat =

Swiss photographer

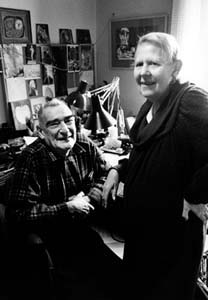
Henriette Grindat and Albert-Edgar Yersin (1983) by Erling Mandelmann.

Henriette Grindat (1923–1986) was a Swiss photographer. She was a major female contributor to artistic photography, taking a Surrealist approach inspired by the literary trends of the post-war years.

== Biography ==
Born in Biel, Grindat suffered from poliomyelitis as a child. As a result, she matriculated from high school only in 1944. She then studied photography at Gertude Fehr's school, first in Lausanne and later in Vevey, receiving her diploma in 1948.

In 1948, Grindat established her own studio in Lausanne, contributing to Swiss newspapers and journals. The following year she moved to Paris where she worked for international journals and French publishing houses including Bordas, Arthaud and Le Seuil. Inspired by the Surrealist poet Lautréamont, she exhibited at La Hune in Paris, attracting the attention of André Breton, Man Ray, René Char and Albert Camus. Together with Char and Camus, she contributed to La postérité du soleil, which was not published until 1965, five years after Camus' death. On returning to Switzerland, Grindat received federal grants and went on to publish Algérie (1956), Méditerranée (1957), Adriatique (1959) and Le Nil des sources à la mer, des pyramides aux barrages (1960). In the 1960s, she completed photographic projects in the United States, Spain, Austria, Iceland, Czechoslovakia and Italy, where she was particularly taken by Venice. From the beginning of the 1970s, her work turned to the human body and nude photography.

On 25 February 1986, shortly after the death of her companion Albert Yersin, Henriette Grindat took her own life in Lausanne.

== Style ==
Grindat was one of the few Swiss photographers of her time to develop an artistic approach to photography. Her complex surrealistic images were often achieved by means of collage, photograms, or solarisation. Influenced by Camus, she took a keen interest in photographing towns and landscapes next to the sea, fascinated by the effects of light and water.

== Exhibitions ==
Grindat's work was widely exhibited in her lifetime. Recent exhibitions have included:

- 2011: "Henriette Grindat: photographies", Maison de la Photographie Robert Doisneau, Gentilly
- 2010: "Henriette Grindat, Méditerranées", Musée historique de Lausanne
- 2008: "Henriette Grindat: Méditerranées", Fotostiftung Schweiz in Winterthur
