= Lurcy-Lévis =

- Commune
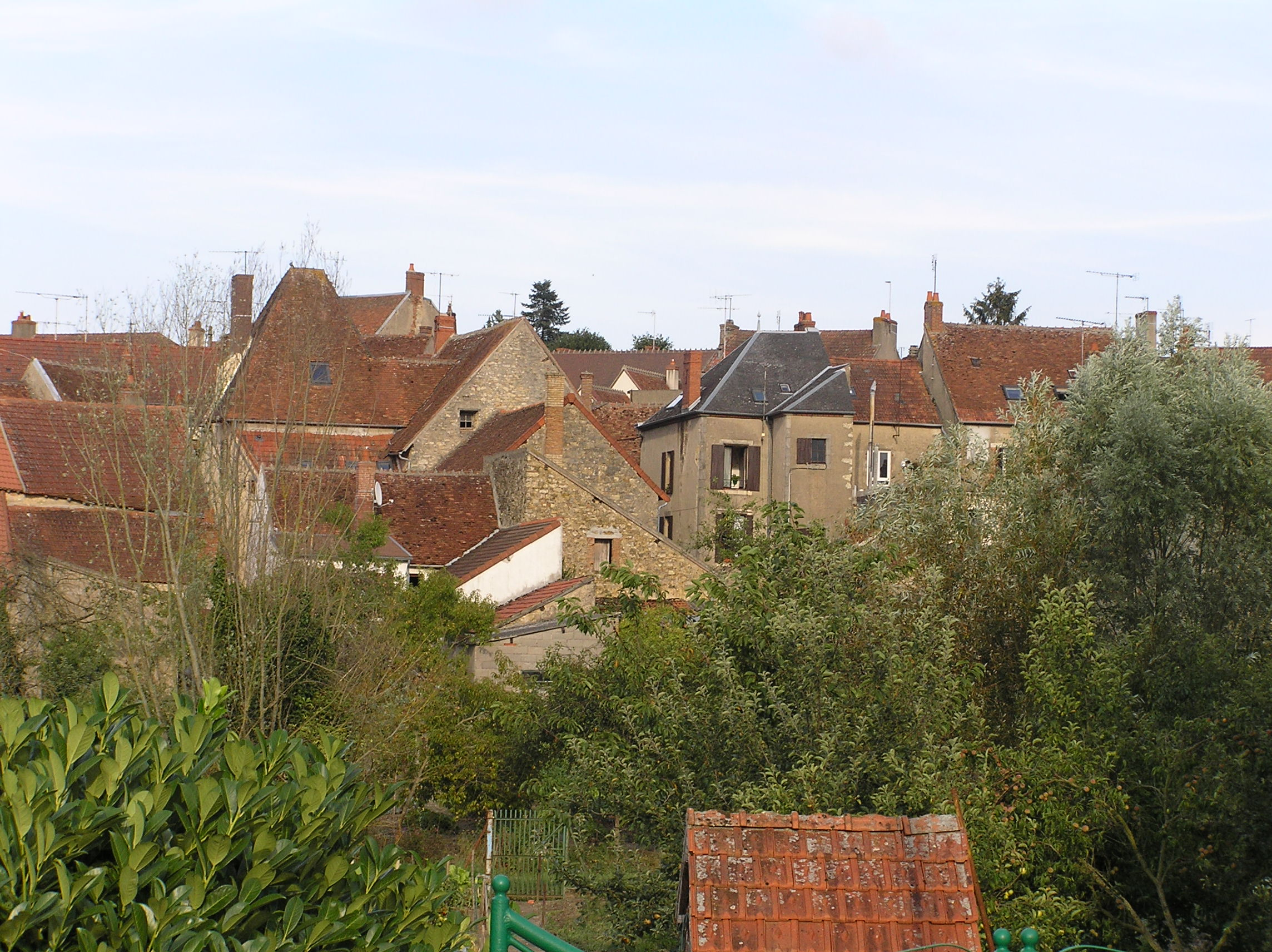
- A general view of Lurcy-Lévis

- Coat of arms
- Location of Lurcy-Lévis
- Location within France Location within Auvergne-Rhône-Alpes
- Coordinates: 46°43′50″N 2°56′21″E
- Country: France
- Region: Auvergne-Rhône-Alpes
- Department: Allier
- Arrondissement: Moulins
- Canton: Bourbon-l'Archambault
- Intercommunality: CA Moulins Communauté

Government
  - Mayor (2026–32): Jacky Signoret
- Area^{1}: 71.42 km^{2} (27.58 sq mi)
- Elevation: 132 m (433 ft)
- Highest elevation: 283 m (928 ft)
- Lowest elevation: 196 m (643 ft)
- Population (2023): 1,821
  - Density: 25.50/km^{2} (66.04/sq mi)
- Time zone: UTC+01:00 (CET)
  - Summer (DST): UTC+02:00 (CEST)
- INSEE/Postal code: 03155 /03320
- ^{1} French Land Register data, which excludes lakes, ponds, glaciers > 1 km^{2} (0.386 sq mi or 247 acres) and river estuaries.

Lurcy-Lévis (French pronunciation: [lyʁsi levi]) is a commune on the northern limits the Allier department in Auvergne in central France.

It is around 24 km (15 mi) east of Saint-Amand-Montrond and the A71 autoroute and 38 km (24 mi) northwest of Moulins.

== Population ==
Historical population
Year	Pop.	±% p.a.
1968	2,429	—
1975	2,292	−0.83%
1982	2,294	+0.01%
1990	2,080	−1.22%
1999	2,092	+0.06%
2007	2,134	+0.25%
2012	2,026	−1.03%
2017	1,893	−1.35%
2023	1,821	−0.64%
Source: INSEE

== Economy ==
Within Lurcy-Lévis, there is a small Atac supermarket, a tourist information centre and a few specialist shops. Lurcy-Lévis was the home to Sociétie A Baudin a manufacturer of woodworking machines and particular for the machines needed to turn and hollow a full wooden clog.

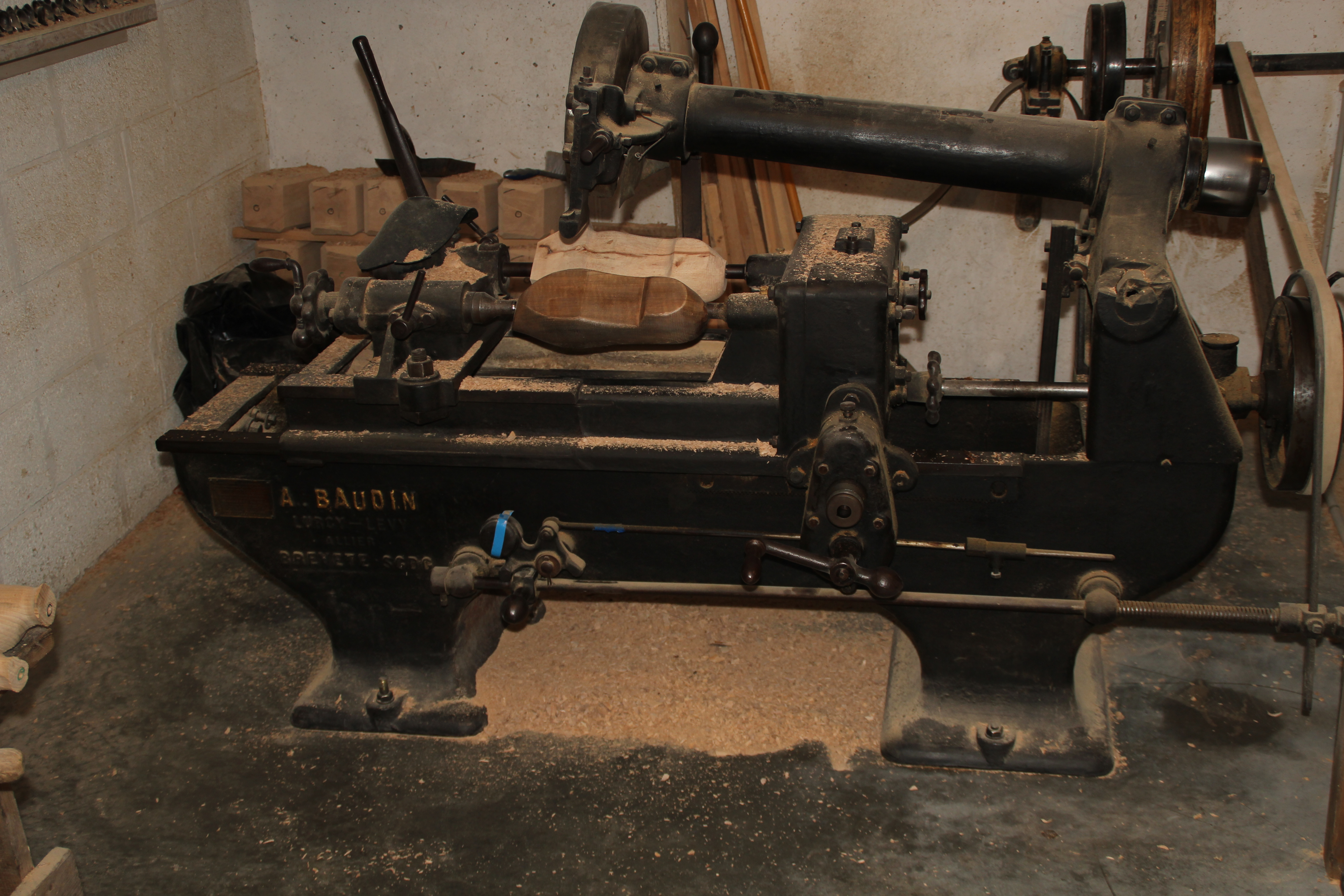
Lathe

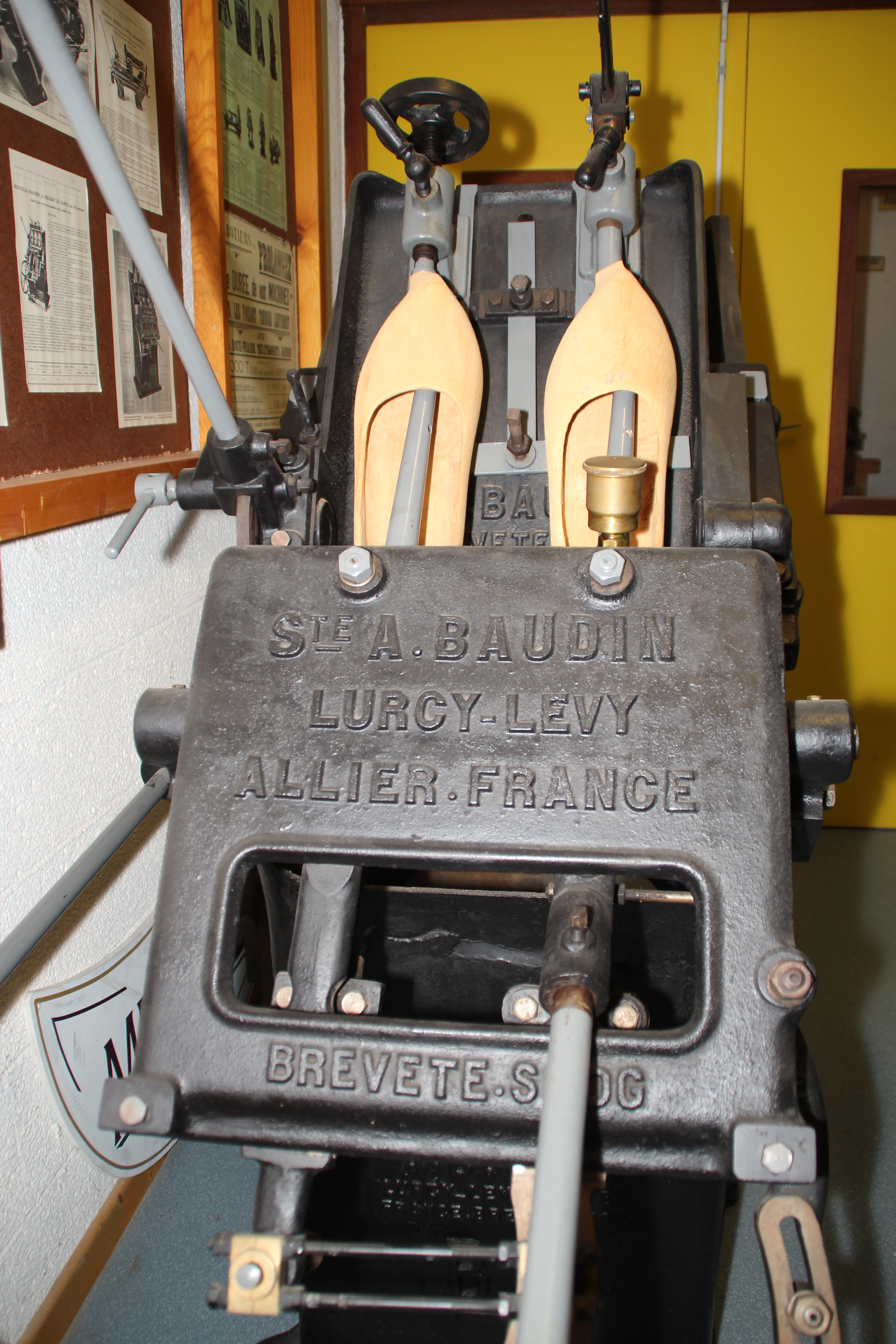
Lurcy-Levy! The clog on the left is the template- and the one on the right is being cut to match.

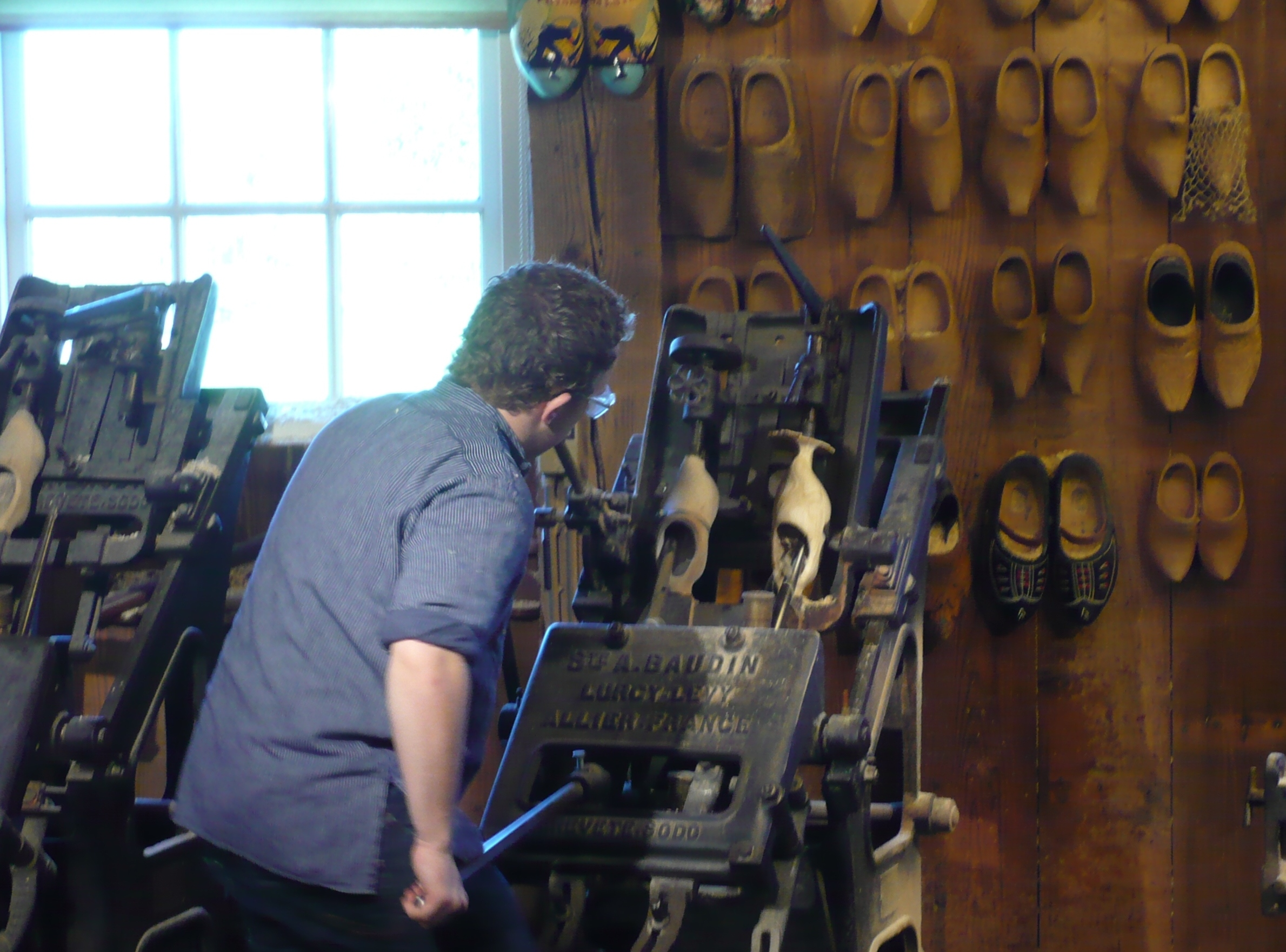
In the Netherlands

== Sport ==
Nearby there is also a motor racing test track able to accommodate F1 and F3 racing cars. The Grand Prix circuit of Magny-Cours is only 30 km (19 mi) away.

== Climate ==
Climate data for Lurcy-Lévis (1991–2020 averages)
Month	Jan	Feb	Mar	Apr	May	Jun	Jul	Aug	Sep	Oct	Nov	Dec	Year
Record high °C (°F)	18.4 (65.1)	21.0 (69.8)	24.7 (76.5)	28.4 (83.1)	31.8 (89.2)	40.0 (104.0)	41.2 (106.2)	41.1 (106.0)	35.7 (96.3)	31.6 (88.9)	25.0 (77.0)	18.4 (65.1)	41.2 (106.2)
Mean daily maximum °C (°F)	7.3 (45.1)	8.7 (47.7)	13.0 (55.4)	16.2 (61.2)	20.0 (68.0)	23.9 (75.0)	26.4 (79.5)	26.4 (79.5)	22.1 (71.8)	17.1 (62.8)	11.3 (52.3)	7.8 (46.0)	16.7 (62.1)
Daily mean °C (°F)	3.9 (39.0)	4.5 (40.1)	7.7 (45.9)	10.3 (50.5)	14.1 (57.4)	17.8 (64.0)	19.8 (67.6)	19.7 (67.5)	15.7 (60.3)	12.1 (53.8)	7.3 (45.1)	4.5 (40.1)	11.4 (52.5)
Mean daily minimum °C (°F)	0.6 (33.1)	0.3 (32.5)	2.3 (36.1)	4.4 (39.9)	8.2 (46.8)	11.6 (52.9)	13.3 (55.9)	13.0 (55.4)	9.3 (48.7)	7.1 (44.8)	3.4 (38.1)	1.1 (34.0)	6.2 (43.2)
Record low °C (°F)	−13.5 (7.7)	−13.6 (7.5)	−12.1 (10.2)	−6.0 (21.2)	−1.6 (29.1)	2.1 (35.8)	4.6 (40.3)	2.3 (36.1)	−0.3 (31.5)	−8.2 (17.2)	−10.7 (12.7)	−12.9 (8.8)	−13.6 (7.5)
Average precipitation mm (inches)	53.0 (2.09)	47.3 (1.86)	45.9 (1.81)	64.3 (2.53)	77.6 (3.06)	57.8 (2.28)	55.3 (2.18)	61.6 (2.43)	60.3 (2.37)	63.4 (2.50)	69.1 (2.72)	61.6 (2.43)	717.2 (28.24)
Average precipitation days (≥ 1.0 mm)	10.7	9.5	8.9	10.3	10.4	8.6	7.5	7.6	8.2	10.4	11.7	11.5	115.4
Mean monthly sunshine hours	72.4	101.6	161.8	194.9	212.7	246.2	254.5	237.4	196.8	130.2	79.9	67.1	1,955.4
Source: Meteociel

== See also ==
- Communes of the Allier department
