= Escurolles =

- Commune
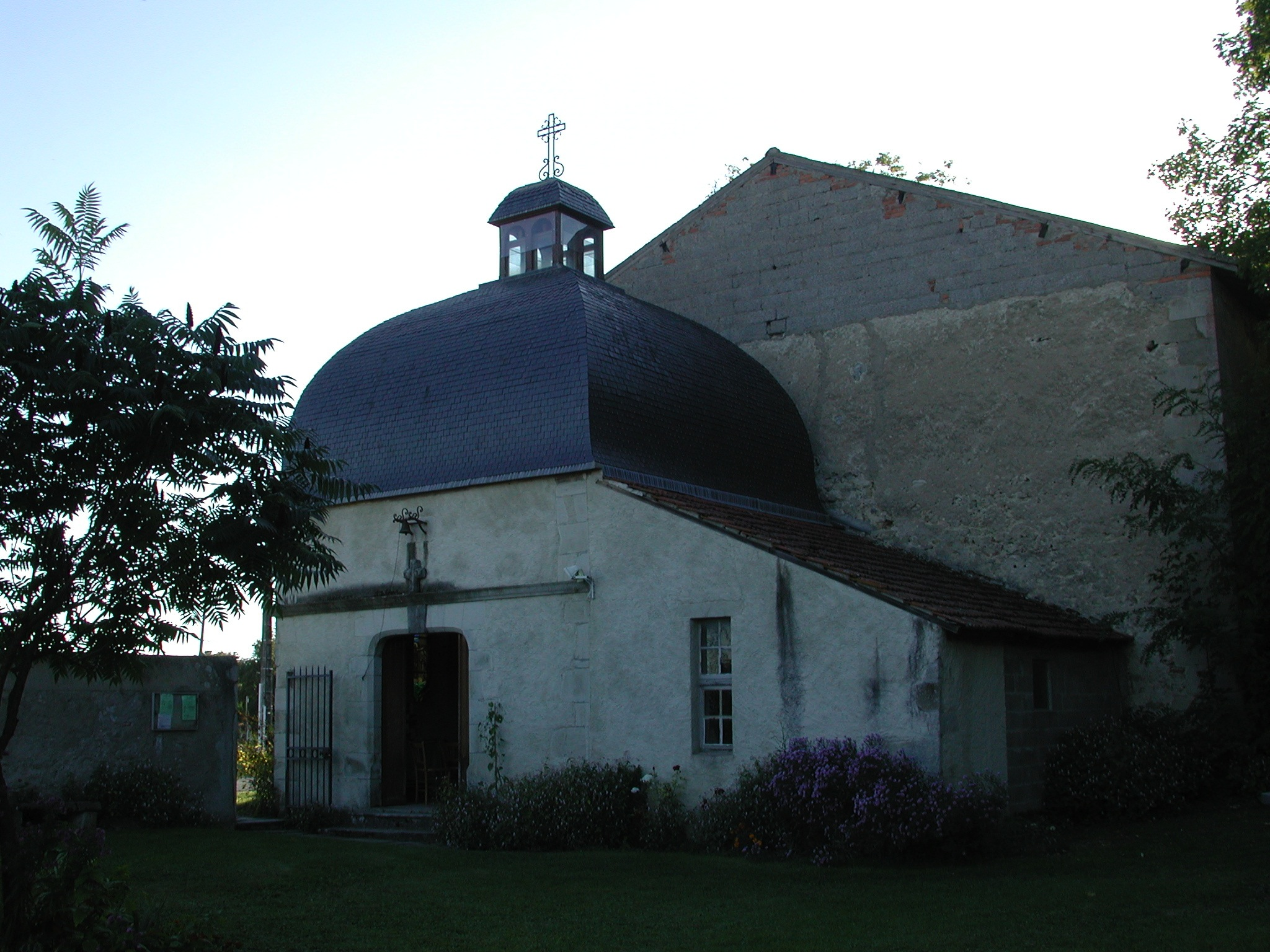
- The church in Escurolles

- Coat of arms
- Location of Escurolles
- Location within France Location within Auvergne-Rhône-Alpes
- Coordinates: 46°08′39″N 3°15′58″E
- Country: France
- Region: Auvergne-Rhône-Alpes
- Department: Allier
- Arrondissement: Vichy
- Canton: Bellerive-sur-Allier
- Intercommunality: Saint-Pourçain Sioule Limagne

Government
  - Mayor (2026–32): Bertrand Bechonnet
- Area^{1}: 13.27 km^{2} (5.12 sq mi)
- Elevation: 320 m (1,050 ft)
- Highest elevation: 323 m (1,060 ft)
- Lowest elevation: 287 m (942 ft)
- Population (2023): 804
  - Density: 60.6/km^{2} (157/sq mi)
- Time zone: UTC+01:00 (CET)
  - Summer (DST): UTC+02:00 (CEST)
- INSEE/Postal code: 03109 /03110
- ^{1} French Land Register data, which excludes lakes, ponds, glaciers > 1 km^{2} (0.386 sq mi or 247 acres) and river estuaries.

Escurolles (French pronunciation: [ɛskyʁɔl]; Occitan: Escuròlas) is a commune in the Allier department in central France.

== Population ==
Historical population
Year	Pop.	±% p.a.
1968	623	—
1975	617	−0.14%
1982	662	+1.01%
1990	668	+0.11%
1999	657	−0.18%
2007	723	+1.20%
2012	747	+0.66%
2017	775	+0.74%
2023	804	+0.61%
Source: INSEE

== See also ==
- Communes of the Allier department
