= Cognat-Lyonne =

- Commune
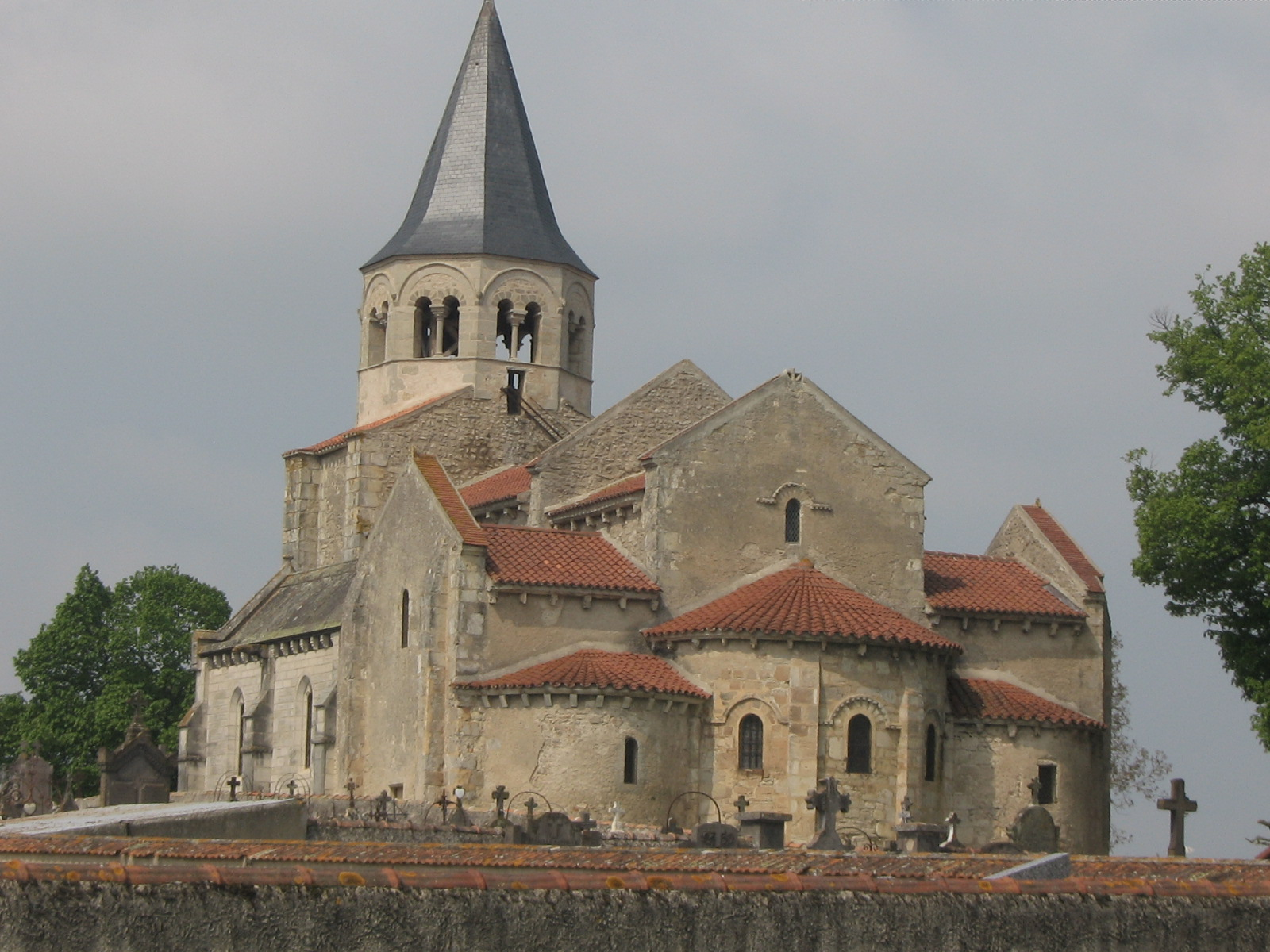
- Sainte-Radegonde Church

- Coat of arms
- Location of Cognat-Lyonne
- Location within France Location within Auvergne-Rhône-Alpes
- Coordinates: 46°06′33″N 3°18′39″E
- Country: France
- Region: Auvergne-Rhône-Alpes
- Department: Allier
- Arrondissement: Vichy
- Canton: Bellerive-sur-Allier
- Intercommunality: CA Vichy Communauté

Government
  - Mayor (2026–32): Jean-Claude Chatard
- Area^{1}: 12.51 km^{2} (4.83 sq mi)
- Elevation: 360 m (1,180 ft)
- Highest elevation: 368 m (1,207 ft)
- Lowest elevation: 308 m (1,010 ft)
- Population (2023): 706
  - Density: 56.4/km^{2} (146/sq mi)
- Time zone: UTC+01:00 (CET)
  - Summer (DST): UTC+02:00 (CEST)
- INSEE/Postal code: 03080 /03110
- ^{1} French Land Register data, which excludes lakes, ponds, glaciers > 1 km^{2} (0.386 sq mi or 247 acres) and river estuaries.

Cognat-Lyonne (French pronunciation: [kɔɲa ljɔn]; Occitan: Conhat e Liona) is a commune in the department of Allier in Auvergne-Rhône-Alpes in central France.

== Population ==
Historical population
Year	Pop.	±% p.a.
1968	488	—
1975	501	+0.38%
1982	474	−0.79%
1990	556	+2.01%
1999	547	−0.18%
2007	626	+1.70%
2012	689	+1.94%
2017	694	+0.14%
2023	706	+0.29%
Source: INSEE

== Government ==
List of successive mayors:

- 1919-1945: Étienne Pélisson
- 1945-1971: Lucien Riet
- 1971-1977: Pierre Gillet
- 1977-1983: André Goutheraud
- 1983-1989: Raymond Mazal
- 1989-unknown: André Goutheraud
- 2001-current: Raymond Mazal

== Culture & Heritage ==
- Sainte-Radegonde church (12th century): Historical Monument
- Lyonne castle (18th century) built by Robert de Lyonne
- Rilhat castle

== See also ==
- Communes of the Allier department
