= Domérat =

- Commune
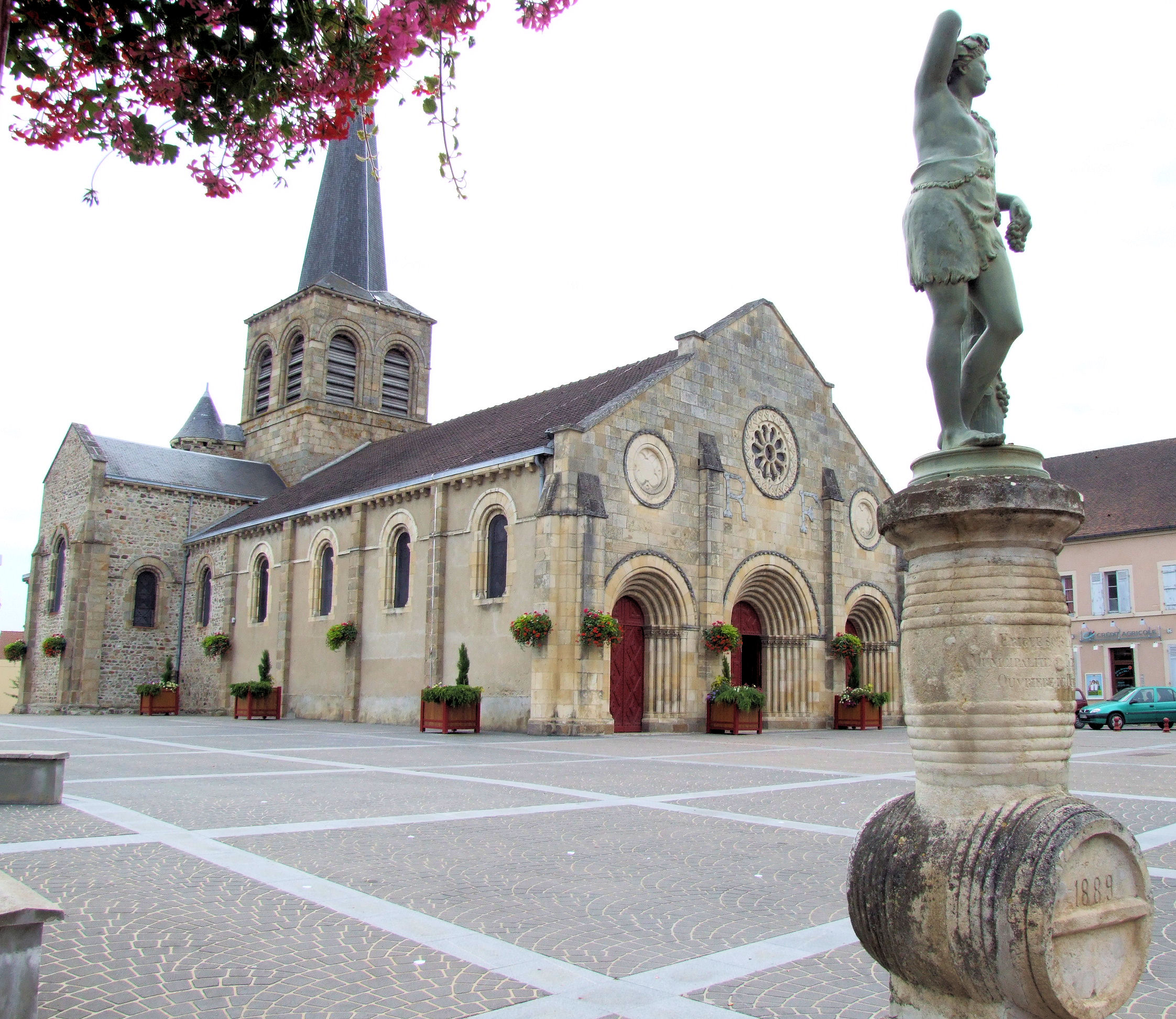
- The church in Domérat

- Coat of arms
- Location of Domérat
- Location within France Location within Auvergne-Rhône-Alpes
- Coordinates: 46°21′40″N 2°32′07″E
- Country: France
- Region: Auvergne-Rhône-Alpes
- Department: Allier
- Arrondissement: Montluçon
- Canton: Montluçon-1
- Intercommunality: CA Montluçon Communauté

Government
  - Mayor (2026–32): Marc Malbet
- Area^{1}: 35.54 km^{2} (13.72 sq mi)
- Elevation: 243 m (797 ft)
- Highest elevation: 376 m (1,234 ft)
- Lowest elevation: 197 m (646 ft)
- Population (2023): 8,622
  - Density: 242.6/km^{2} (628.3/sq mi)
- Time zone: UTC+01:00 (CET)
  - Summer (DST): UTC+02:00 (CEST)
- INSEE/Postal code: 03101 /03410
- ^{1} French Land Register data, which excludes lakes, ponds, glaciers > 1 km^{2} (0.386 sq mi or 247 acres) and river estuaries.

Domérat (French pronunciation: [dɔmeʁa]; Occitan: Domairac) is a commune in the Allier department in central France.

== Population ==
Historical population

| Year | Pop. | ±% p.a. |
|---|---|---|
| 1793 | 1,810 | — |
| 1800 | 1,456 | −3.06% |
| 1806 | 1,367 | −1.05% |
| 1821 | 2,113 | +2.95% |
| 1831 | 2,812 | +2.90% |
| 1836 | 3,006 | +1.34% |
| 1841 | 3,022 | +0.11% |
| 1846 | 3,169 | +0.95% |
| 1851 | 3,130 | −0.25% |
| 1856 | 3,129 | −0.01% |
| 1861 | 3,221 | +0.58% |
| 1866 | 3,438 | +1.31% |
| 1872 | 3,524 | +0.41% |
| 1876 | 3,506 | −0.13% |
| 1881 | 3,554 | +0.27% |
| 1886 | 3,657 | +0.57% |
| 1891 | 3,616 | −0.23% |
| 1896 | 3,513 | −0.58% |
| 1901 | 3,353 | −0.93% |

| Year | Pop. | ±% p.a. |
|---|---|---|
| 1906 | 3,535 | +1.06% |
| 1911 | 3,147 | −2.30% |
| 1921 | 2,830 | −1.06% |
| 1926 | 2,831 | +0.01% |
| 1931 | 3,044 | +1.46% |
| 1936 | 3,019 | −0.16% |
| 1946 | 4,177 | +3.30% |
| 1954 | 5,072 | +2.46% |
| 1962 | 5,685 | +1.44% |
| 1968 | 5,725 | +0.12% |
| 1975 | 7,139 | +3.20% |
| 1982 | 8,534 | +2.58% |
| 1990 | 8,875 | +0.49% |
| 1999 | 8,812 | −0.08% |
| 2007 | 9,000 | +0.26% |
| 2012 | 9,030 | +0.07% |
| 2017 | 8,780 | −0.56% |
| 2023 | 8,622 | −0.30% |

Source: EHESS and INSEE (1968-2023)

== See also ==
- Communes of the Allier department
