= Saint-Didier-la-Forêt =

- Commune
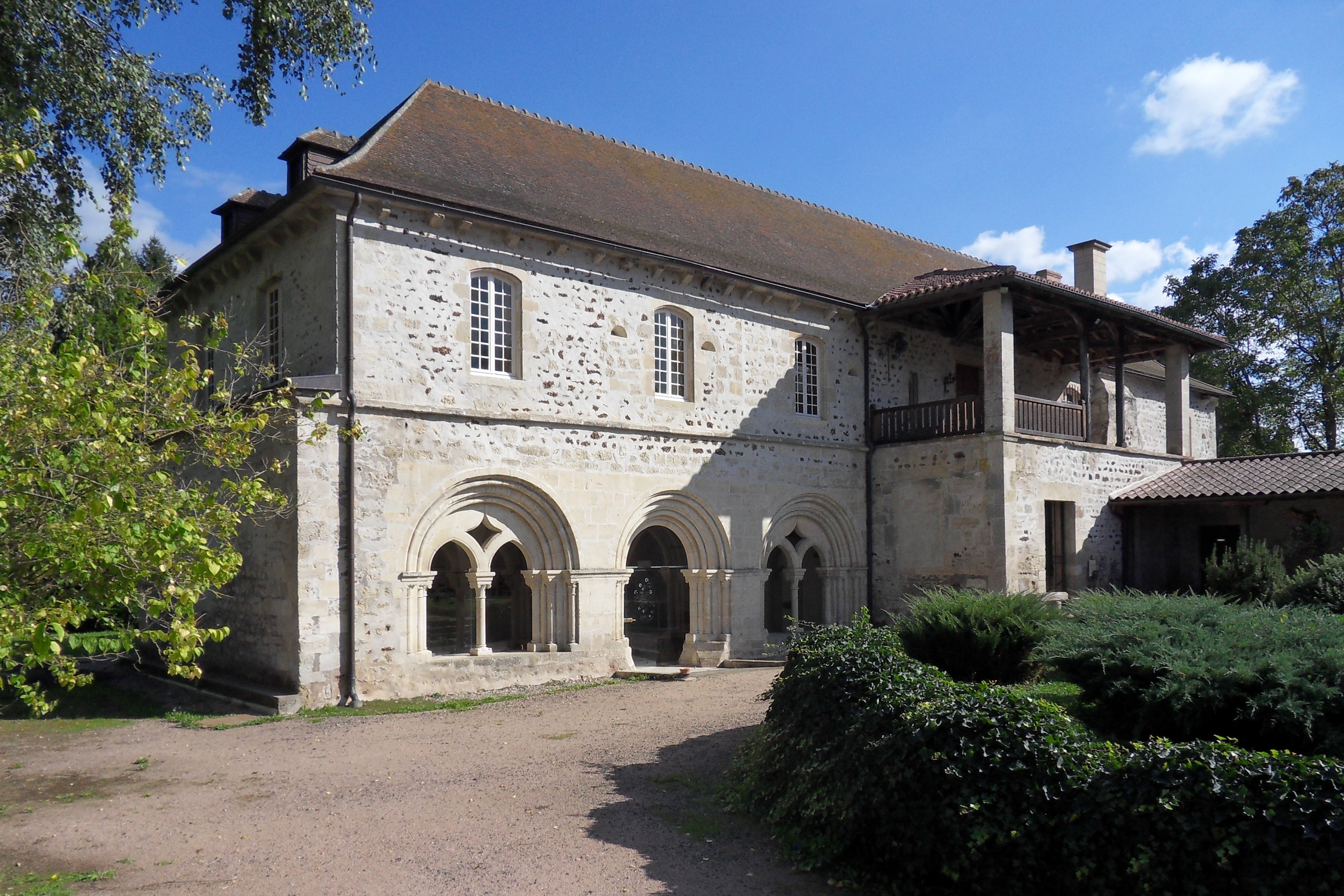
- St. Gilbert Abbey

- Coat of arms
- Location of Saint-Didier-la-Forêt
- Location within France Location within Auvergne-Rhône-Alpes
- Coordinates: 46°13′34″N 3°20′41″E
- Country: France
- Region: Auvergne-Rhône-Alpes
- Department: Allier
- Arrondissement: Vichy
- Canton: Bellerive-sur-Allier

Government
  - Mayor (2026–32): Martine Deschamps
- Area^{1}: 33.59 km^{2} (12.97 sq mi)
- Elevation: 280 m (920 ft)
- Highest elevation: 323 m (1,060 ft)
- Lowest elevation: 246 m (807 ft)
- Population (2023): 399
  - Density: 11.9/km^{2} (30.8/sq mi)
- Time zone: UTC+01:00 (CET)
  - Summer (DST): UTC+02:00 (CEST)
- INSEE/Postal code: 03227 /03110
- ^{1} French Land Register data, which excludes lakes, ponds, glaciers > 1 km^{2} (0.386 sq mi or 247 acres) and river estuaries.

Saint-Didier-la-Forêt (French pronunciation: [sɛ̃ didje la fɔʁɛ]) is a commune in the Allier department in Auvergne-Rhône-Alpes in central France.

== Population ==
Historical population
Year	Pop.	±% p.a.
1968	514	—
1975	427	−2.61%
1982	381	−1.62%
1990	375	−0.20%
1999	360	−0.45%
2007	377	+0.58%
2012	380	+0.16%
2017	379	−0.05%
2023	399	+0.86%
Source: INSEE

== See also ==
- Communes of the Allier department
