= Espinasse-Vozelle =

- Commune
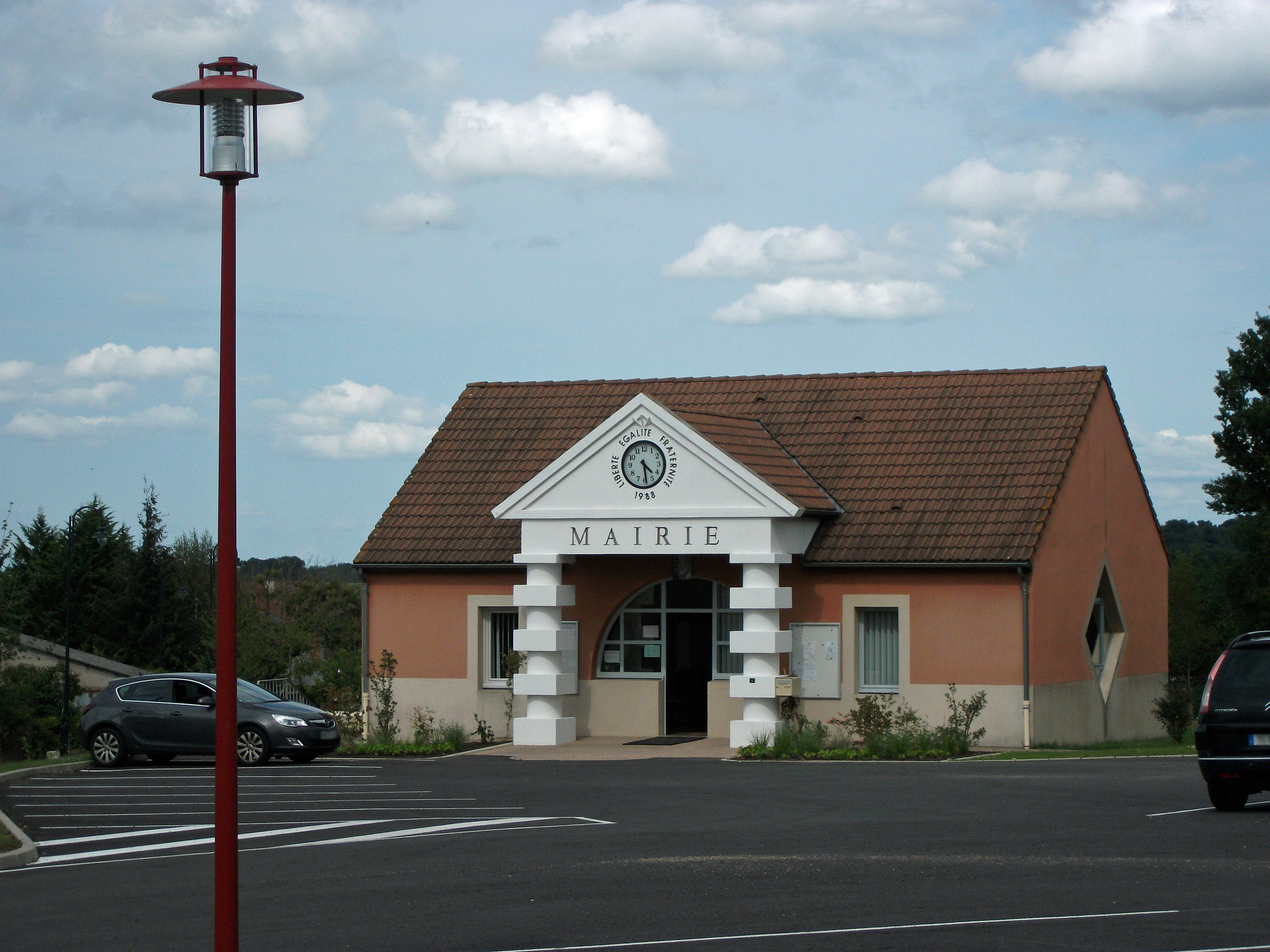
- The town hall in Espinasse-Vozelle
- Location of Espinasse-Vozelle
- Location within France Location within Auvergne-Rhône-Alpes
- Coordinates: 46°07′38″N 3°19′30″E
- Country: France
- Region: Auvergne-Rhône-Alpes
- Department: Allier
- Arrondissement: Vichy
- Canton: Bellerive-sur-Allier
- Intercommunality: CA Vichy Communauté

Government
  - Mayor (2026–32): Michel Marien
- Area^{1}: 17.87 km^{2} (6.90 sq mi)
- Elevation: 344 m (1,129 ft)
- Highest elevation: 362 m (1,188 ft)
- Lowest elevation: 280 m (920 ft)
- Population (2023): 995
  - Density: 55.7/km^{2} (144/sq mi)
- Time zone: UTC+01:00 (CET)
  - Summer (DST): UTC+02:00 (CEST)
- INSEE/Postal code: 03110 /03110
- ^{1} French Land Register data, which excludes lakes, ponds, glaciers > 1 km^{2} (0.386 sq mi or 247 acres) and river estuaries.

Espinasse-Vozelle (French pronunciation: [ɛspinas vɔzɛl]; Occitan: Espinassa e Vozela) is a commune in the Allier department in central France.

== Population ==
Historical population
Year	Pop.	±% p.a.
1968	485	—
1975	500	+0.44%
1982	559	+1.61%
1990	736	+3.50%
1999	739	+0.05%
2007	821	+1.32%
2012	932	+2.57%
2017	991	+1.24%
2023	995	+0.07%
Source: INSEE

== See also ==
- Communes of the Allier department
