= Serbannes =

- Commune
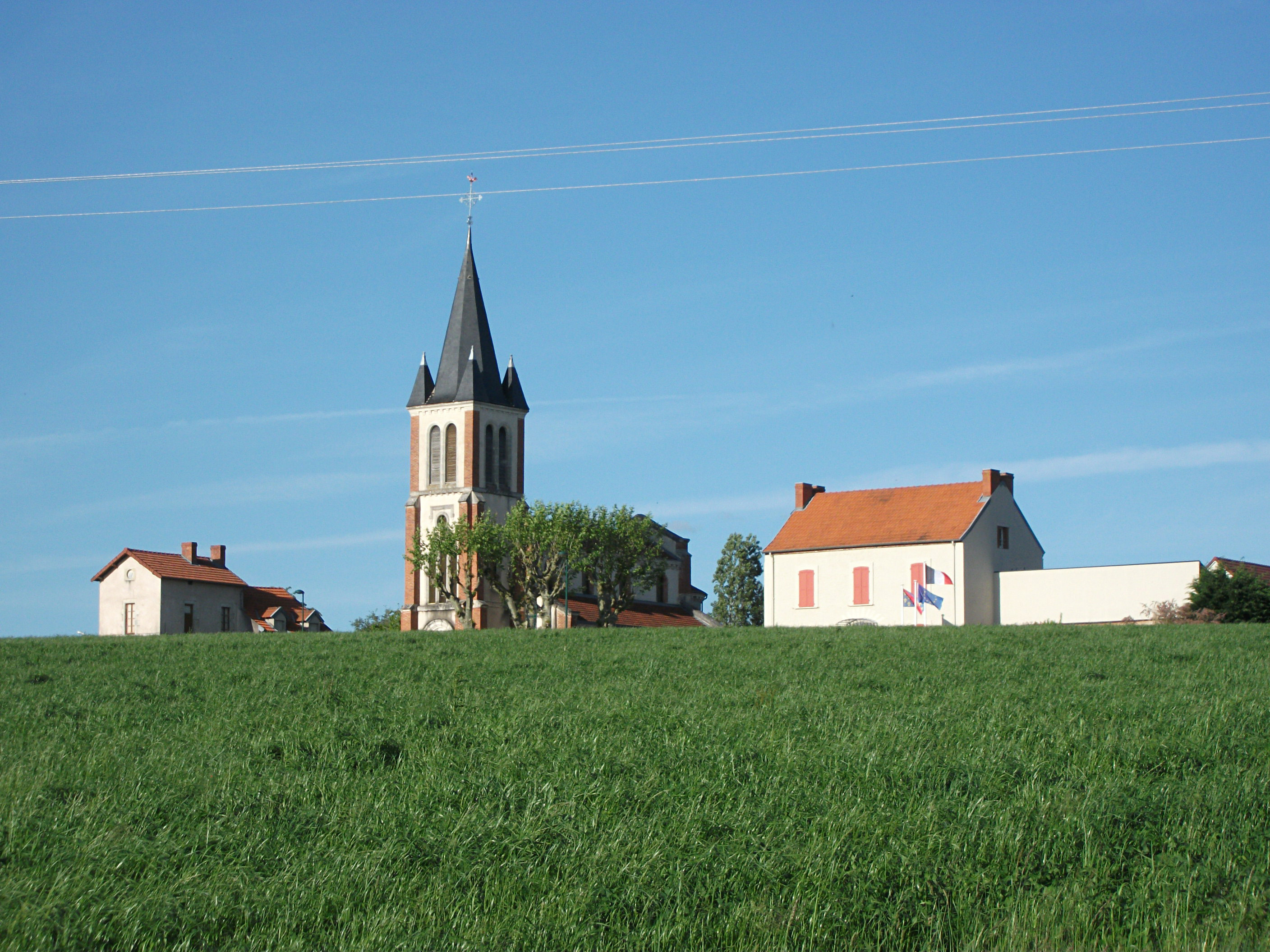
- Church and town hall.
- Location of Serbannes
- Location within France Location within Auvergne-Rhône-Alpes
- Coordinates: 46°05′58″N 3°21′34″E
- Country: France
- Region: Auvergne-Rhône-Alpes
- Department: Allier
- Arrondissement: Vichy
- Canton: Bellerive-sur-Allier
- Intercommunality: CA Vichy Communauté

Government
  - Mayor (2026–32): Christine Bouard
- Area^{1}: 14.3 km^{2} (5.5 sq mi)
- Elevation: 360 m (1,180 ft)
- Highest elevation: 375 m (1,230 ft)
- Lowest elevation: 278 m (912 ft)
- Population (2023): 854
  - Density: 59.7/km^{2} (155/sq mi)
- Time zone: UTC+01:00 (CET)
  - Summer (DST): UTC+02:00 (CEST)
- INSEE/Postal code: 03271 /03700
- ^{1} French Land Register data, which excludes lakes, ponds, glaciers > 1 km^{2} (0.386 sq mi or 247 acres) and river estuaries.

Serbannes (French pronunciation: [sɛʁban]; Occitan: Serbanas) is a commune in the Allier department in Auvergne-Rhône-Alpes in central France.

== Population ==
Historical population

| Year | Pop. | ±% p.a. |
|---|---|---|
| 1793 | 514 | — |
| 1821 | 459 | −0.40% |
| 1846 | 776 | +2.12% |
| 1872 | 707 | −0.36% |
| 1901 | 567 | −0.76% |
| 1926 | 515 | −0.38% |
| 1946 | 474 | −0.41% |
| 1962 | 500 | +0.33% |
| 1968 | 527 | +0.88% |

| Year | Pop. | ±% p.a. |
|---|---|---|
| 1975 | 536 | +0.24% |
| 1982 | 650 | +2.79% |
| 1990 | 757 | +1.92% |
| 1999 | 689 | −1.04% |
| 2007 | 717 | +0.50% |
| 2012 | 770 | +1.44% |
| 2017 | 820 | +1.27% |
| 2023 | 854 | +0.68% |

Source: EHESS and INSEE

== Administration ==
- March 2001–March 2008: Jean Debut
- March 2008–current: Raymond Pourchon

== See also ==
- Communes of the Allier department
