= Bellerive-sur-Allier =

- Commune
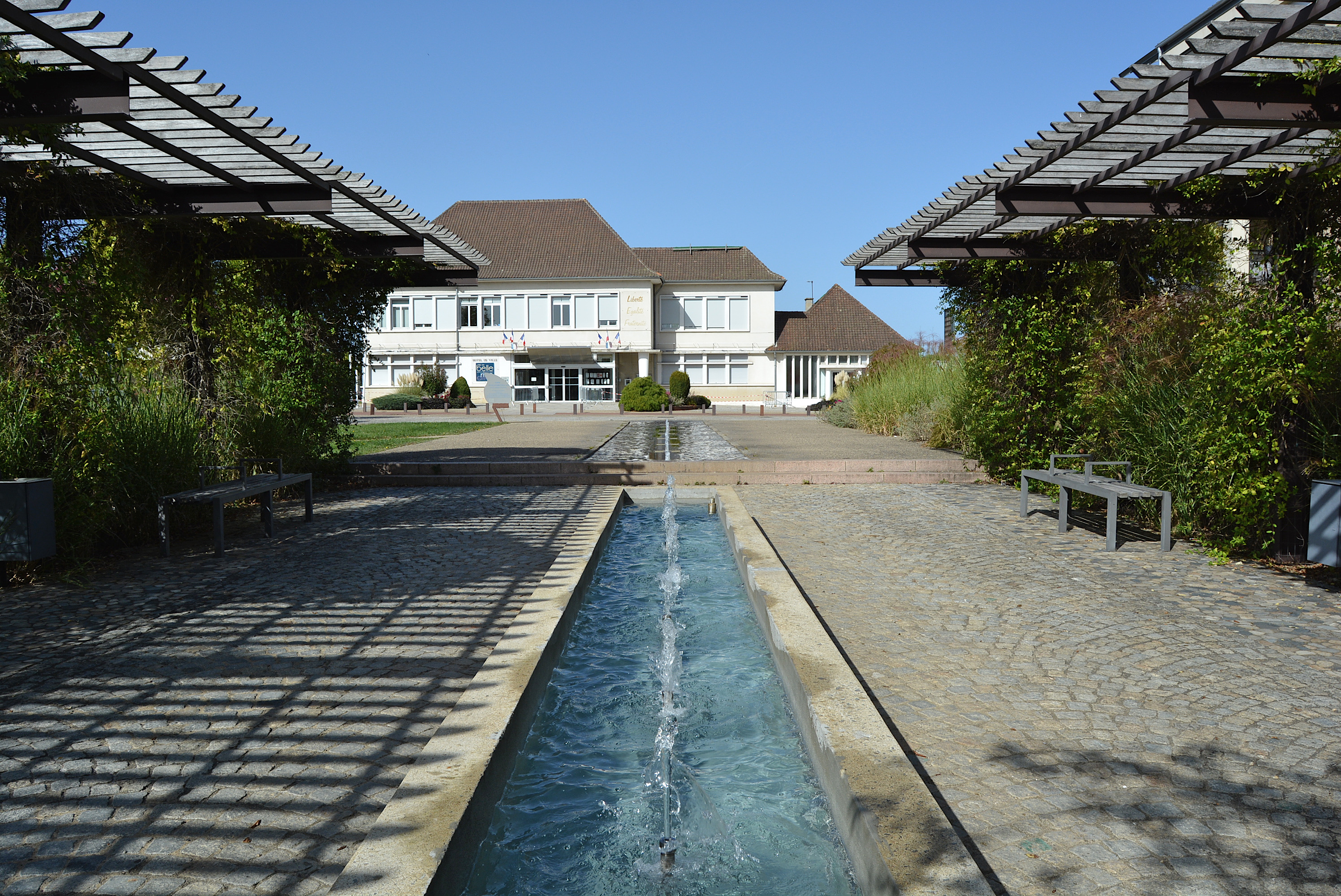
- Esplanade François-Mitterrand and town hall (in the second ground) in 2023.

- Coat of arms
- Location of Bellerive-sur-Allier
- Location within France Location within Auvergne-Rhône-Alpes
- Coordinates: 46°07′03″N 3°24′16″E
- Country: France
- Region: Auvergne-Rhône-Alpes
- Department: Allier
- Arrondissement: Vichy
- Canton: Bellerive-sur-Allier
- Intercommunality: CA Vichy Communauté

Government
  - Mayor (2026–32): François Sennepin
- Area^{1}: 18.97 km^{2} (7.32 sq mi)
- Elevation: 280 m (920 ft)
- Highest elevation: 337 m (1,106 ft)
- Lowest elevation: 247 m (810 ft)
- Population (2023): 8,943
  - Density: 471.4/km^{2} (1,221/sq mi)
- Time zone: UTC+01:00 (CET)
  - Summer (DST): UTC+02:00 (CEST)
- INSEE/Postal code: 03023 /03700
- Website: ville-bellerive-sur-allier.fr
- ^{1} French Land Register data, which excludes lakes, ponds, glaciers > 1 km^{2} (0.386 sq mi or 247 acres) and river estuaries.

Bellerive-sur-Allier (French pronunciation: [bɛlʁiv syʁ alje]; Occitan: Vaissa) is a commune in the Allier department in central France.

Known as Vesse or Vaisse, it was renamed Bellerive-sur-Allier in 1903.

== Population ==
Historical population

Year	Pop.	±% p.a.
1793	580	—
1800	580	+0.00%
1806	752	+4.42%
1821	691	−0.56%
1831	813	+1.64%
1836	870	+1.36%
1841	897	+0.61%
1846	951	+1.18%
1851	1,016	+1.33%
1856	1,034	+0.35%
1861	1,058	+0.46%
1866	1,306	+4.30%
1872	1,296	−0.13%
1876	1,278	−0.35%
1881	1,408	+1.96%
1886	1,505	+1.34%
1891	1,606	+1.31%
1896	1,762	+1.87%
1901	1,931	+1.85%

Year	Pop.	±% p.a.
1906	2,104	+1.73%
1911	2,333	+2.09%
1921	2,361	+0.12%
1926	2,890	+4.13%
1931	3,287	+2.61%
1936	3,363	+0.46%
1946	3,752	+1.10%
1954	4,008	+0.83%
1962	5,367	+3.72%
1968	5,953	+1.74%
1975	7,317	+2.99%
1982	8,188	+1.62%
1990	8,543	+0.53%
1999	8,444	−0.13%
2007	8,617	+0.25%
2012	8,578	−0.09%
2017	8,500	−0.18%
2023	8,943	+0.85%

Source: EHESS and INSEE

== Geography ==
=== Location ===
Bellerive-sur-Allier was member of Gannat district in 1793, which becomes an arrondissement in 1801; member of the arrondissement of Lapalisse from 1926 to 1942 and arrondissement of Vichy since 1942. It was member of the canton of Escurolles from 1801 to 2015. The commune is the centralizer office of the canton of Bellerive-sur-Allier (11 communes) since March 2015.

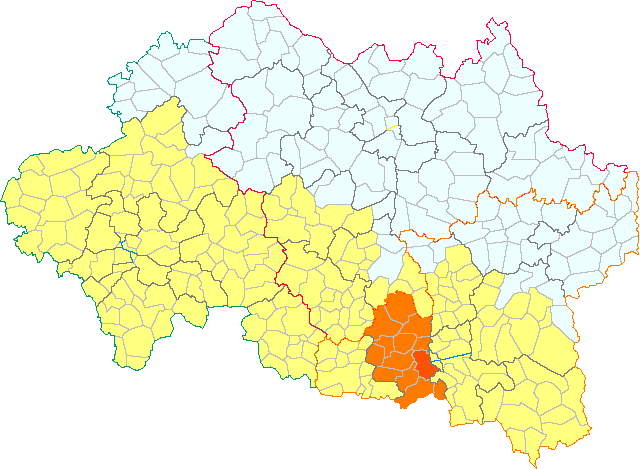
Bellerive-sur-Allier in the former canton of Escurolles (before March 2015).

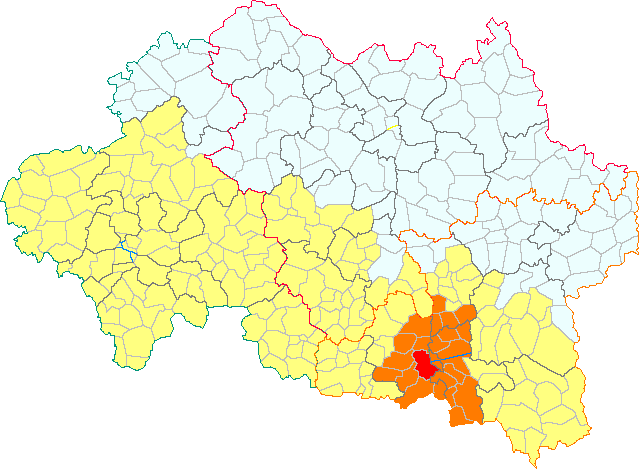
Bellerive-sur-Allier in the former Vichy Val d'Allier intercommunality.

=== Transportation ===
==== Road transportation ====
Bellerive-sur-Allier is at the junction of several main roads, including the main ones:

- the departemental road 2209 (D2209);
- the departmental road 1093 (D1093);
- the departemental road 984 (D984) passing by the town hall;
- the departemental road 6 (D6) coming from Saint-Pourçain-sur-Sioule.

These main roads are not enough to relieve congestion at peak hours (quasi-permanent stoppers on deck Bellerive) and the arrival of the A719 motorway in 2015, though it approaches the heart of the town, was not enough to improve the traffic conditions.

The main roads are closed to vehicles weighing more than 7.5 tonnes except for local traffic. Controls are organized regularly by municipal services to ensure that heavy vehicles comply with the regulations.

Parking is free. It performs even side on even years and odd side on odd years.

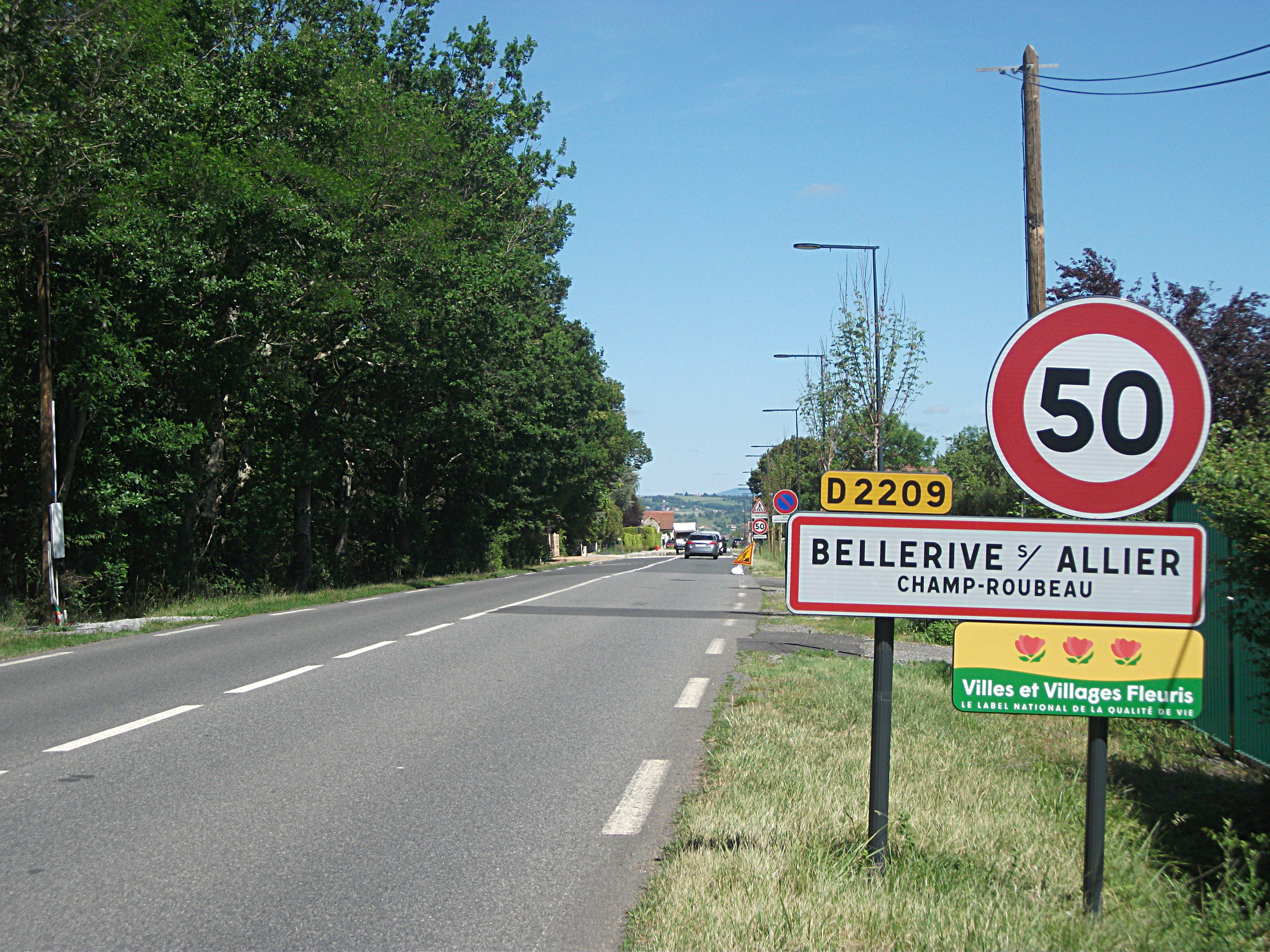
Entrance by D2209 from Gannat

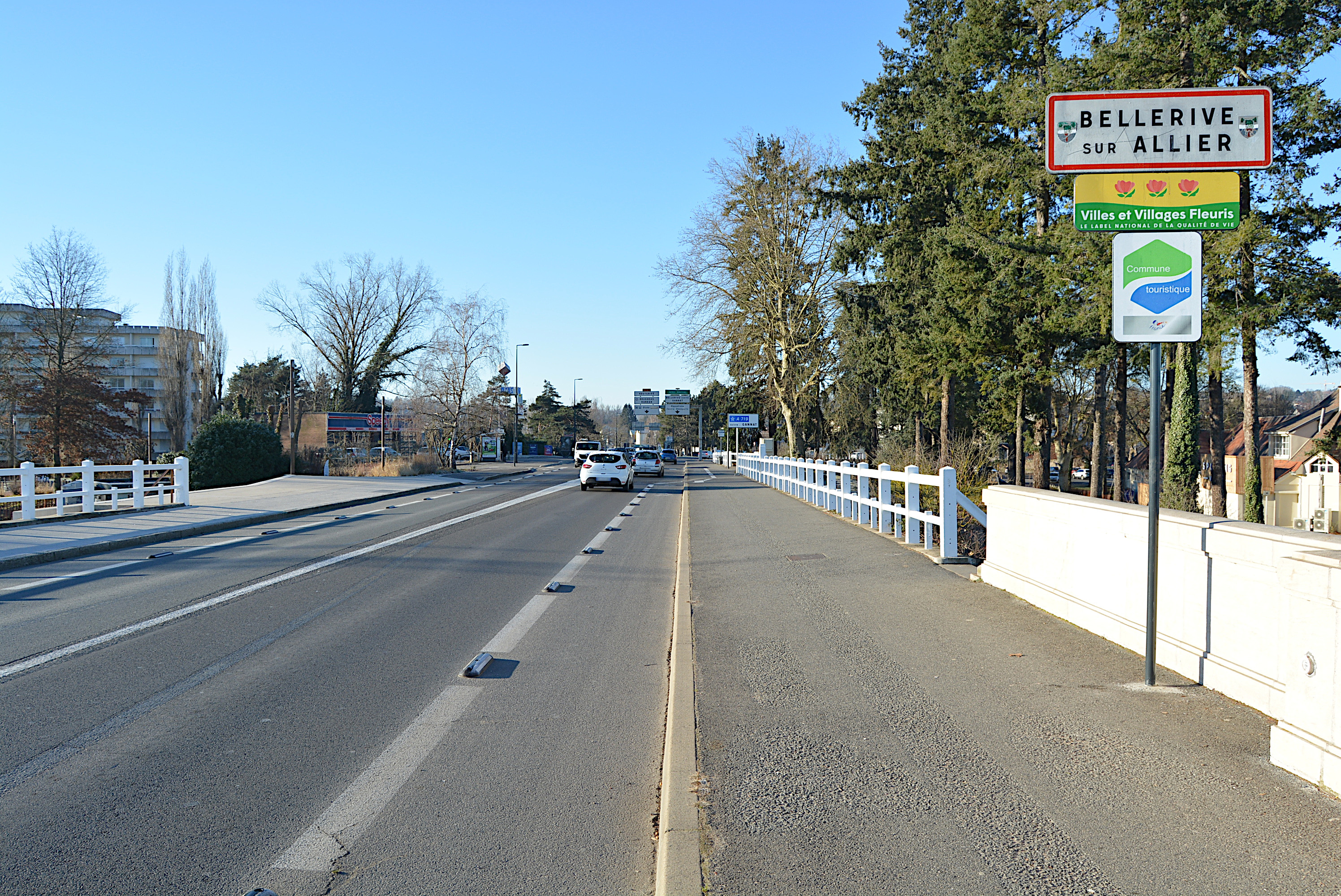
Entrance by D2209 from Vichy

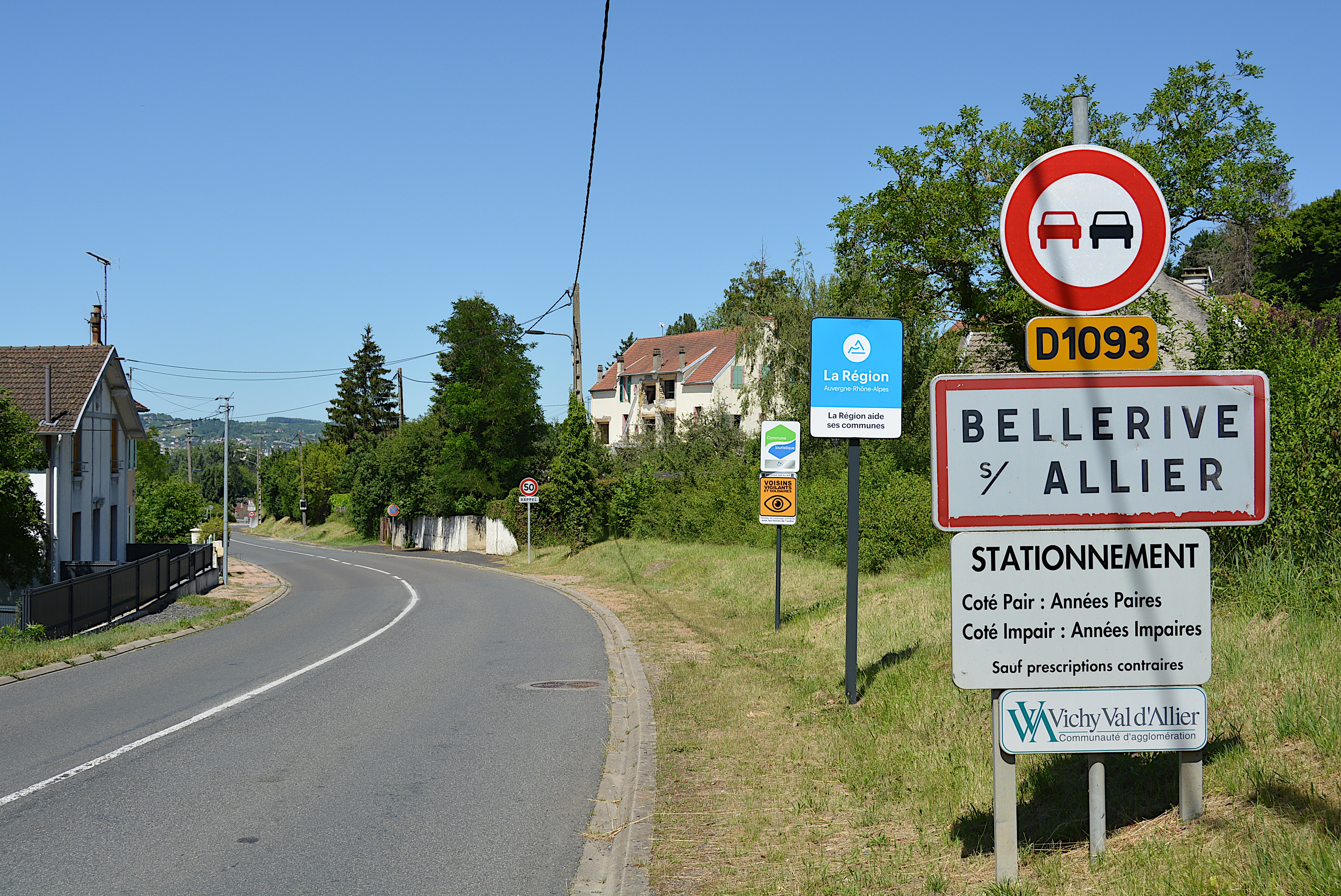
D1093

==== Cycling transportation ====
Bike lanes were built on part of the D2209, on the Avenue de Vichy and Avenue de la République (renovated in 2024-2025) in both directions, as well as a portion of the Maurice-Chalus street, a portion of one-way between Jean-Ferlot street and the church (between two traffic calmings).

Bike paths also exist around the bridge of Europe.

In July 2010, a 2.7 km-cycle route was established between the Bellerive bridge and the swimming centre. This service comes despite an impairment of this signaling equipment, better service. New roads have been built and existing roads were adapted.

Round of the Lac d'Allier by bike is completed in July 2011.

The Via Allier, a 27 km-route following the Allier River from Saint-Yorre to Billy, created in 2020, passes in Bellerive-sur-Allier.

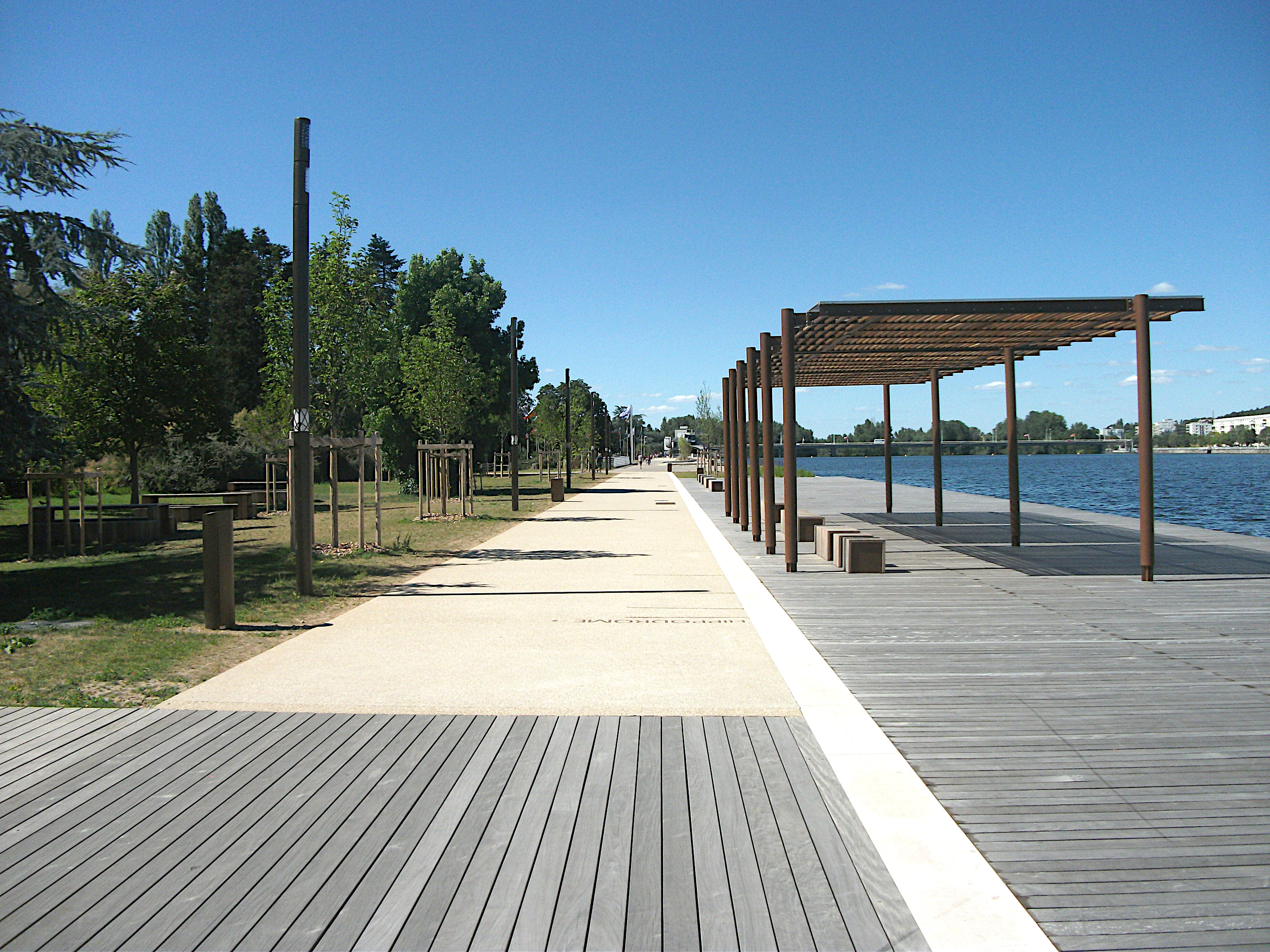
Berges de l'Allier renovated in 2019

==== Urban transportation ====
The city is served by five lines of the bus network MobiVie.

== Politics and administration ==
The current mayor is François Sennepin, elected in 2020.

=== Twin towns ===
- Hadamar, Germany
- Impruneta, Italy

== See also ==
- Communes of the Allier department
