= Vendat =

- Commune
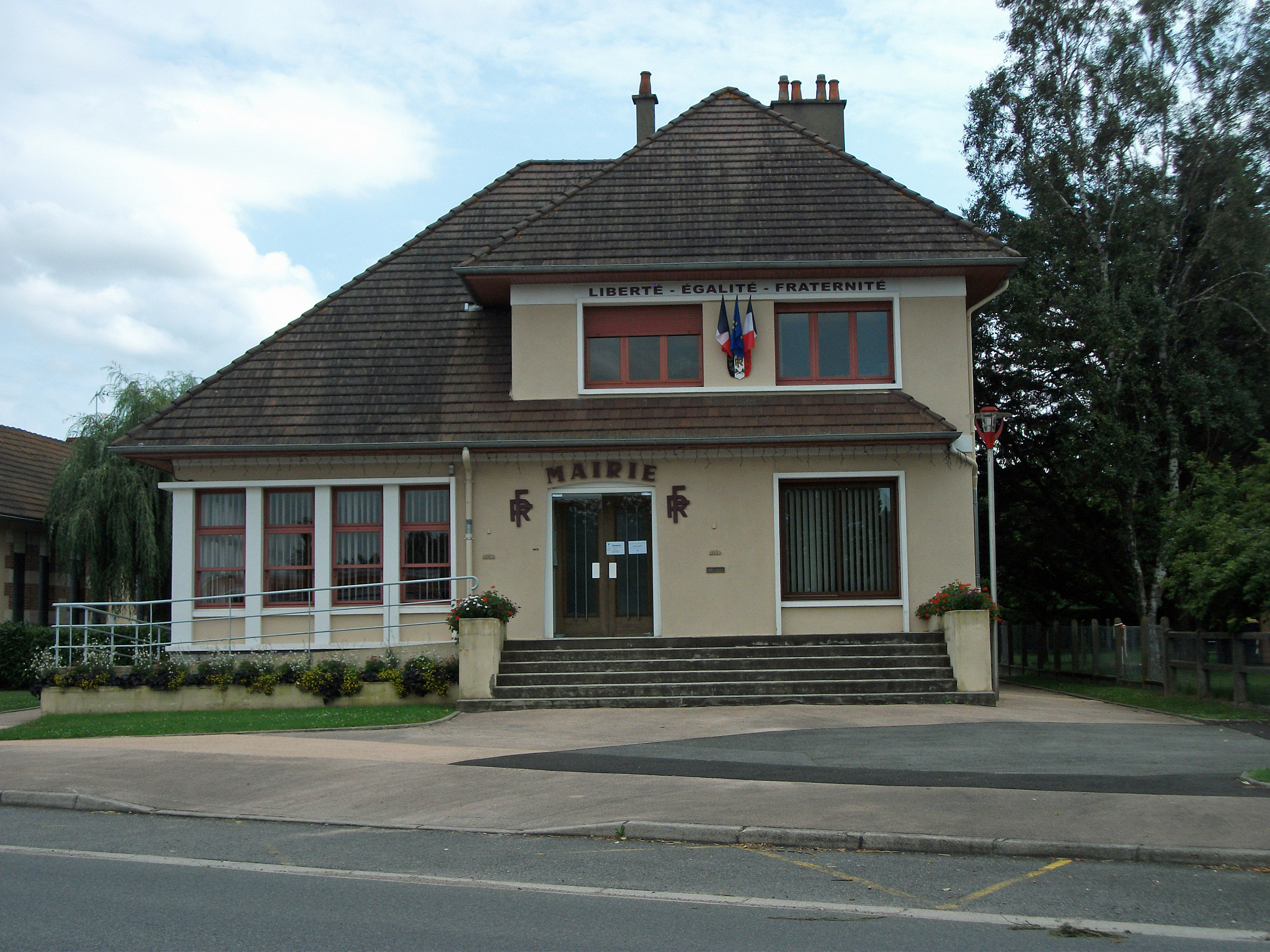
- Town hall

- Coat of arms
- Location of Vendat
- Location within France Location within Auvergne-Rhône-Alpes
- Coordinates: 46°09′53″N 3°21′15″E
- Country: France
- Region: Auvergne-Rhône-Alpes
- Department: Allier
- Arrondissement: Vichy
- Canton: Bellerive-sur-Allier
- Intercommunality: CA Vichy Communauté

Government
  - Mayor (2026–32): Jean-Marc Germanangue
- Area^{1}: 16.76 km^{2} (6.47 sq mi)
- Elevation: 340 m (1,120 ft)
- Highest elevation: 345 m (1,132 ft)
- Lowest elevation: 265 m (869 ft)
- Population (2023): 2,292
  - Density: 136.8/km^{2} (354.2/sq mi)
- Time zone: UTC+01:00 (CET)
  - Summer (DST): UTC+02:00 (CEST)
- INSEE/Postal code: 03304 /03110
- ^{1} French Land Register data, which excludes lakes, ponds, glaciers > 1 km^{2} (0.386 sq mi or 247 acres) and river estuaries.

Vendat (French pronunciation: [vɑ̃da]) is a commune in the Allier department in Auvergne-Rhône-Alpes in central France.

== Population ==
Historical population
Year	Pop.	±% p.a.
1968	930	—
1975	1,185	+3.52%
1982	1,613	+4.50%
1990	1,881	+1.94%
1999	1,968	+0.50%
2007	2,158	+1.16%
2012	2,234	+0.69%
2017	2,216	−0.16%
2023	2,292	+0.56%
Source: INSEE

== See also ==
- Communes of the Allier department
