= Brugheas =

- Commune
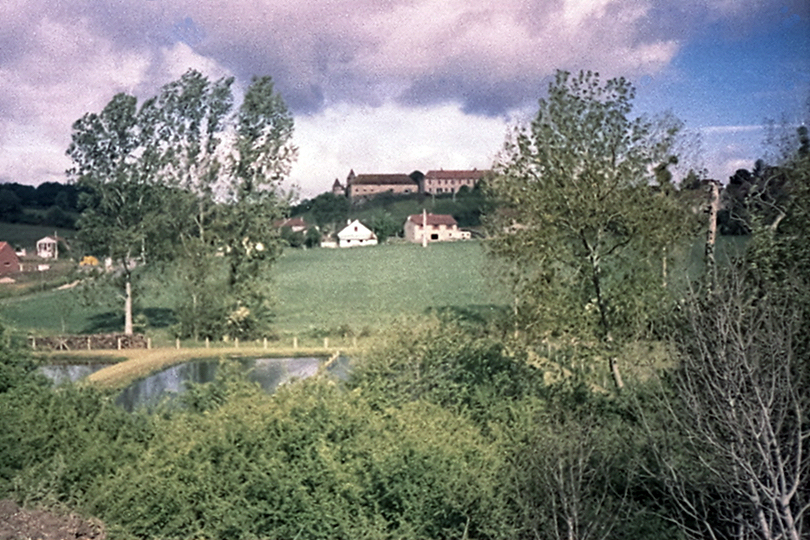
- A general view of Brugheas
- Location of Brugheas
- Location within France Location within Auvergne-Rhône-Alpes
- Coordinates: 46°04′39″N 3°22′07″E
- Country: France
- Region: Auvergne-Rhône-Alpes
- Department: Allier
- Arrondissement: Vichy
- Canton: Bellerive-sur-Allier
- Intercommunality: CA Vichy Communauté

Government
  - Mayor (2026–32): Daniel Bono
- Area^{1}: 26.81 km^{2} (10.35 sq mi)
- Elevation: 350 m (1,150 ft)
- Highest elevation: 383 m (1,257 ft)
- Lowest elevation: 269 m (883 ft)
- Population (2023): 1,564
  - Density: 58.34/km^{2} (151.1/sq mi)
- Time zone: UTC+01:00 (CET)
  - Summer (DST): UTC+02:00 (CEST)
- INSEE/Postal code: 03044 /03700
- ^{1} French Land Register data, which excludes lakes, ponds, glaciers > 1 km^{2} (0.386 sq mi or 247 acres) and river estuaries.

Brugheas (French pronunciation: [bʁyʒas]) is a commune in the Allier department in central France.

== Population ==
Historical population

Year	Pop.	±% p.a.
1793	1,310	—
1800	1,600	+2.90%
1806	1,495	−1.12%
1821	1,766	+1.12%
1831	1,828	+0.35%
1836	1,803	−0.28%
1841	1,759	−0.49%
1846	1,827	+0.76%
1851	1,871	+0.48%
1856	1,741	−1.43%
1861	1,710	−0.36%
1866	1,669	−0.48%
1872	1,622	−0.47%
1876	1,686	+0.97%
1881	1,636	−0.60%
1886	1,560	−0.95%
1891	1,462	−1.29%
1896	1,464	+0.03%
1901	1,325	−1.98%

Year	Pop.	±% p.a.
1906	1,275	−0.77%
1911	1,255	−0.32%
1921	1,042	−1.84%
1926	1,080	+0.72%
1931	1,071	−0.17%
1936	1,005	−1.26%
1946	910	−0.99%
1954	1,005	+1.25%
1962	1,012	+0.09%
1968	1,012	+0.00%
1975	1,096	+1.15%
1982	1,200	+1.30%
1990	1,213	+0.13%
1999	1,223	+0.09%
2007	1,301	+0.78%
2012	1,402	+1.51%
2017	1,484	+1.14%
2023	1,564	+0.88%

Source: EHESS and INSEE

== See also ==
- Communes of the Allier department
