= Departmental Council of Allier =

Departmental Council of Allier Conseil départemental de l'Allier
- Logo of the Council

Leadership
- President: Claude Riboulet, UDI since 25 September 2017

Structure
- Seats: 38
- Political groups: Government (28): DVD (20); LR (6); UDI (2); Opposition (10): PS - PCF (8); PRG (2)

Meeting place
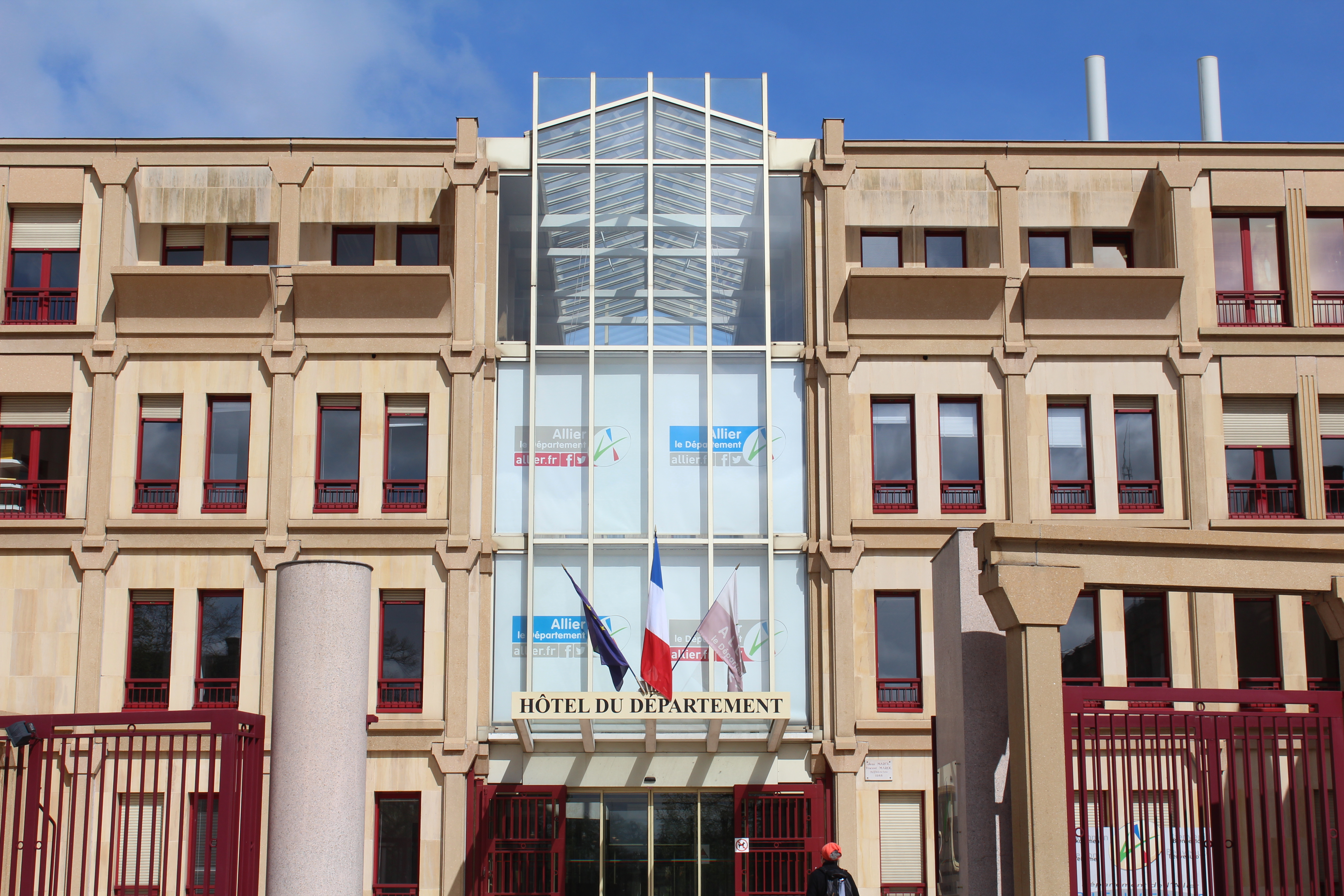
- Hôtel du Département, Moulins

Website
- www.allier.fr

The Departmental Council of Allier (French: Conseil départemental de l'Allier, Occitan: Conselh Departamentau d'Alèir) is the deliberative assembly of the Allier department in the region of Auvergne-Rhône-Alpes. It consists of 38 members (general councillors) from 19 cantons.

The President of the Departmental Council is Claude Riboulet.

== Executive ==
=== List of presidents ===
Since 1914, the presidents of the Departmental Council of Allier have been.

List of successive presidents of the Departmental Council of Allier
Term		Name	Party
President of the General Council
1914	1928	Marcel Régnier	PR
1928	1931	Paul Constans	SFIO
1931	1933	Marx Dormoy	SFIO
1933	1935	Isidore Thivrier	SFIO
1935	1940	Armand Chaulier	SFIO
1945	1970	Georges Rougeron	SFIO
1970	1976	Jean Cluzel	Center right
1976	1979	Georges Rougeron	PS
1979	1982	Henri Guichon	PCF
1982	1985	Henri Coque	DVD
1985	1992	Jean Cluzel	Center right
1992	1998	Gérard Dériot	DVD
1998	2001	Jean-Claude Mairal	PCF
2001	2008	Gérard Dériot	DVD
2008	2015	Jean-Paul Dufrègne	PCF
President of the Departmental Council
2015	2017	Gérard Dériot	UMP then LR
2017	Incumbent	Claude Riboulet	UDI

=== List of vice-presidents ===
The president of the Departmental Council is assisted by 10 vice-presidents chosen from among the departmental advisers. Each of them has a delegation of authority.

List of vice-presidents of the Allier Departmental Council (as of 2021)
Order	Name	Party	Canton (constituency)	Delegation
1st	Jean-Sébastien Laloy	LR	Cusset	Territorial development and partnerships
2nd	Véronique Pouzadoux	UD	Gannat	Mobility infrastructure, buildings and development projects
3rd	Christian Chito	DVD	Montluçon-3	Digital and sustainable development
4th	Cécile de Breuvand	DVD	Moulins-1	Culture and heritage
5th	André Bidaud	UD	Gannat	Colleges and transport for students with disabilities
6th	Anne-Cécile Benoît-Gola	UCD	Montluçon-2	Elderly
7th	Roger Litaudon	DVD	Saint-Pourçain-sur-Sioule	Housing and energy
8th	Annie Corne	LR	Cusset	Integration and employment
9th	Fabrice Maridet	DVD	Dompierre-sur-Besbre	Human resources and general administration
10th	Evelyne Voitellier	DVD	Vichy-2	People with disabilities and prevention policies, territorial referent for health and provision of health care in the Vichy basin

== See also ==
- Allier
- Departmental councils of France
