= Chantemerle (disambiguation) =

Chantemerle is a commune in the Marne department in north-eastern France. Chantemerle may also refer to:

== Places ==
- Chantemerle-les-Blés, commune in the Drôme department in southeastern France
- Chantemerle-lès-Grignan, commune in the Drôme department in southeastern France
- Chantemerle-sur-la-Soie, commune in the Charente-Maritime department in the Nouvelle-Aquitaine region in southwestern France

== People ==
- Louis de Chantemerle (1818–1893), French magistrate who was Senator of Allier from 1876 to 1885

== Other ==
- Château de Chantemerle, ruined castle in the commune of La Bâthie in the Savoie département of France
