= List of senators of Allier =

Location of Allier in France

Following is a list of senators of Allier, people who have represented the department of Allier in the Senate of France.

== Third Republic ==
Senators for Allier under the French Third Republic were:

| Term | Name |
|---|---|
| 1876–1885 | Louis de Chantemerle |
| 1876–1885 | Charles-Auguste Martenot |
| 1876–1885 | Albert Peyronnet |
| 1876–1884 | Charles de Veauce |
| 1885–1903 | Eugène Bruel |
| 1885–1903 | Joseph Chantemille |
| 1885–1903 | Victor André Cornil |
| 1903–1912 | Michel Boissier |
| 1903–1914 | Jules Gacon |
| 1903–1918 | Pierre Ville |
| 1920–1945 | Jean Beaumont |
| 1920–1939 | Marcel Régnier |
| 1939–1941 | Marx Dormoy |

== Fourth Republic ==
Senators for Allier under the French Fourth Republic were:

| Term | Name |
|---|---|
| 1946–1948 | Marcel Guyot |
| 1946–1959 | André Southon |
| 1948–1959 | Fernand Auberger |

== Fifth Republic ==
Senators for Allier under the French Fifth Republic:

| Term | Name | Group |
|---|---|---|
| 1959–1962 | Fernand Auberger | |
| 1959–1971 | Georges Rougeron | |
| 1962–1962 | François Minard | |
| 1962–1970 | Roger Besson | |
| 1970–1971 | Pierre Gonard | |
| 1971–1972 | Jean Nègre | |
| 1971–1998 | Jean Cluzel | |
| 1972–1989 | André Rabineau | |
| 1989–2008 | Bernard Barraux | |
| 1998-present | Gérard Dériot | Les Républicains |
| 2008–2014 | Mireille Schurch | Communiste républicain citoyen et écologiste |
| 2014–present | Claude Malhuret | Les Indépendants - République et Territoires |

== Sources ==
- Liste des anciens sénateurs de la IIIème République par circonscription (in French), Sénat de France
- Liste des anciens sénateurs de la IVème République par circonscription (in French), Sénat de France
- Liste des anciens sénateurs de la Vème République par circonscription (in French), Sénat de France
- Liste par département – Allier (in French), Sénat de France
