= Allier's 1st constituency =

Constituency of the National Assembly of France

- inline Constituency of the National Assembly of France

- Boundary of Allier's 1st constituency in Allier

- Location of Allier within France
- Deputy: Yannick Monnet; PCF
- Department: Allier

The 1st constituency of Allier is a French legislative constituency located in north east Allier département. It takes in the town of Moulins, and has an estimated total population of 77,746.

== Members elected ==
Election	Member	Party
1958	Paul Maridet	Union for the New Republic
1962	Marcel Guyot	French Communist Party
1967	Marcel Guyot	French Communist Party
1968	Hector Rolland	Union of Democrats for the Republic
1973	Hector Rolland	Union of Democrats for the Republic
1978	Hector Rolland	Rally for the Republic
1981	Jean-Paul Desgranges	Socialist Party
1986	Proportional representation - no election by constituency	
1988	François Colcombet	Socialist Party
1993	Pierre-André Périssol	Rally for the Republic
1995	Guy Canard	Rally for the Republic
1997	François Colcombet	Socialist Party
2002	Pierre-André Périssol	Union for a Popular Movement
2007	Guy Chambefort	Miscellaneous left
2012	Guy Chambefort	Miscellaneous left
2017	Jean-Paul Dufrègne	French Communist Party
2022	Yannick Monnet	French Communist Party
2024	Yannick Monnet	French Communist Party

== Election results ==
=== 2024 ===
Candidate	Party	Alliance	First round			Second round		
Candidate	Party	Alliance	Votes	%	+/–	Votes	%	+/–
Anne-Marie Thés	RN		22,816	38.61	+19.21	27,839	49.49	
Yannick Monnet	PCF	NFP	17,043	28.84	-1.73	28,411	50.51	
Stephane Larzat	RE	ENS	8,811	14.91	-4.53			
Alexandra Bardet	LR		7,889	13.35	+1.02			
Jean-Marie Guillaumin	DVD		1,303	2.20	N/A			
Jean-Marc Collot	LO		636	1.08	-0.29			
Blandine Agez	REC		602	1.02	-4.22			
Valid votes			59,100	96.48	-0.52	56,250	91.23	
Blank votes			1,185	1.93	-0.15	3,864	6.27	
Null votes			974	1.59	+0.67	1,544	2.50	
Turnout			61,259	69.18	+17.93	61,658	69.63	
Abstentions			27,288	30.82	-17.93	26,895	30.37	
Registered voters			88,547			88,553		
Source: Ministry of the Interior, Le Monde
Result						PCF HOLD		

=== 2022 ===
Legislative Election 2022: Allier's 1st constituency
Party	Candidate	Votes	%	±%
PCF (NUPÉS)	Yannick Monnet	13,578	30.57	-0.79
LREM (Ensemble)	Michel Barbarin	8,634	19.44	-9.60
RN	Marie Cibert	8,615	19.40	+9.10
LR (UDC)	Roger Litaudon	6,476	12.33	−7.92
PS	Jean Mallot*	3,463	7.80	+3.36
REC	Pierre De Nicolay	2,326	5.24	N/A
LMR	Fabien Malavaud	936	2.11	N/A
Others	N/A	1,389	-	−
Turnout		44,417	51.25	−1.19
2nd round result
PCF (NUPÉS)	Yannick Monnet	21,832	55.51	+3.66
LREM (Ensemble)	Michel Barbarin	17,496	44.49	−3.66
Turnout		39,328	48.82	−0.48
PCF hold		Swing	+3.66	

* Jean Mallot stood as a dissident member of the Socialist Party, which is part of the NUPES alliance. Therefore, the 2017 PS result is included in the NUPES total for swing calculations. Mallot's swing is calculated against his own result from 2017.

=== 2017 ===
Candidate	Label	First round		Second round	
Candidate	Label	Votes	%	Votes	%
Pauline Rivière	REM	13,267	29.04	19,424	48.15
Jean-Paul Dufrègne	PCF	10,351	22.66	20,915	51.85
Pierre-André Périssol	LR	9,248	20.25		
Michèle Ciuch	FN	4,706	10.30		
Magali Alexandre	PS	3,079	6.74		
Jean Mallot	DVG	2,026	4.44		
Corentin Blache	DLF	896	1.96		
Luderce Poinambalom	ECO	894	1.96		
Jean-Marc Collot	EXG	460	1.01		
Albino Amato	DIV	302	0.66		
Fabienne Mottet	DVG	293	0.64		
Hasna Domeck	DIV	157	0.34		
Votes		45,679	100.00	40,339	100.00
Valid votes		45,679	97.17	40,339	91.23
Blank votes		933	1.98	2,522	5.70
Null votes		399	0.85	1,356	3.07
Turnout		47,011	52.44	44,217	49.30
Abstentions		42,643	47.56	45,476	50.70
Registered voters		89,654		89,693	
Source: Ministry of the Interior

=== 2012 ===
Summary of the 10 June and 17 June 2012 French legislative in Allier's 1st Constituency election results
Candidate	Party		1st round		2nd round	
Candidate	Party		Votes	%	Votes	%
Guy Chambefort	Socialist Party	PS	20,947	38.17%	31,207	57.62%
Pierre-André Perissol	Union for a Popular Movement	UMP	18,312	33.36%	22,956	42.38%
Marie-Françoise Lacarin	Left Front	FG	8,050	14.67%		
Yves Lecrique	National Front	FN	5,307	9.67%		
Gérard Matichard	Europe Ecology – The Greens	EELV	1,296	2.36%		
Gérard Guillaumin	Europe Ecology – The Greens	EELV	543	0.99%		
Bernard Lebel	Far Left	ExG	429	0.78%		
Total			54,884	100%	54,163	100%
Registered voters			90,355		90,327	
Blank/Void ballots			1,056	1.17%	2,030	2.25%
Turnout			55,940	61.91%	56,193	62.21%
Abstentions			34,415	38.09%	34,134	37.79%
Result					PS gain	

=== 2007 ===
Summary of the 10 June and 17 June 2007 French legislative in Allier's 1st Constituency election results
Candidate	Party		1st round		2nd round	
Candidate	Party		Votes	%	Votes	%
Guy Chamberfort	Miscellaneous Left	DVG	10,975	30.45%	20,725	54.53%
Pierre-André Perissol	Union for a Popular Movement	UMP	14,563	40.41%	17,285	45.47%
Delphine Mayrargue	Socialist Party	PS	3,122	8.66%		
Jacques Cabanne	Communist	COM	2,384	6.62%		
Danielle Demure	Democratic Movement	MoDem	1,996	5.54%		
Carla de Conde	National Front	FN	876	2.43%		
Gérard Matichard	The Greens	VEC	481	1.33%		
Michèle Beaunieux	Far Left	EXG	464	1.29%		
Jean-Marie Guillaumin	Ecologist	ECO	293	0.81%		
Christophe Darmangeat	Far Left	EXG	267	0.74%		
Michelle Miallet	Movement for France	MPF	202	0.56%		
Hugues Auvray	Divers	DIV	163	0.45%		
Judith Genot	Divers	DIV	131	0.36%		
Serge Deville	Far Right	EXD	117	0.32%		
Suzanne Corgie	Divers	DIV	3	0.01%		
Total			36,037	100%	39,089	100%
Registered voters			58,298		58,297	
Blank/Void ballots			811	2.20%	1,079	2.76%
Turnout			36,848	63.21%	39,089	67.05%
Abstentions			21,450	36.79%	19,208	32.95%
Result					DVG GAIN	

=== 2002 ===
Legislative Election 2002: Allier's 1st constituency
Party	Candidate	Votes	%	±%
UMP	Pierre-André Périssol	14,930	40.47	+4.63
PS	François Colcombet	13,532	36.68	+4.31
FN	Danièle de Salvert	2,747	7.45	−1.30
PCF	Cathy Savel	1,967	5.33	−11.53
Others	N/A	3,713		
Turnout		37,997	65.63	
2nd round result
UMP	Pierre-André Périssol	18,302	50.12	+4.47
PS	François Colcombet	18,218	49.88	−4.47
Turnout		38,011	65.66	
UMP gain from PS				

=== 1997 ===
Legislative Election 1997: Allier's 1st constituency
Party	Candidate	Votes	%	±%
RPR	Pierre-André Périssol	14,077	35.84	+7.39
PS	François Colcombet	12,712	32.37	+5.04
PCF	Jean-Claude Mairal	6,620	16.86	
FN	Dufour Georges	3,435	8.75	
LV	Odile Debeaud-Laforest	1,487	3.79	
MPF	Matine Talon	942	2.40	
Turnout		41,394	71.07	
2nd round result
PS	François Colcombet	22,989	54.35	
RPR	Pierre-André Périssol	19,311	45.65	
Turnout		44,339	76.12	
PS gain from RPR				

=== 1993 ===
Legislative Election 1993: Allier's 1st constituency
Party	Candidate	Votes	%	±%
RPR	Pierre-André Périssol	10,882	28.45	−11.96
PS	François Colcombet	10,451	27.33	−10.37
PCF	Jean-Claude Mairal	5,417	14.16	−2.70
UDF	René Chiroux	5,104	13.35	
RN	Danièle de Salvert Bellenave	3,092	8.08	+2.92
GE	Alain Bréant	2,345	6.13	
The Clover - The New Ecologists	Rosine Barakat	955	2.5	
Turnout		40,525	68.85	+0.88
2nd round result
RPR	Pierre-André Périssol	20,190	50.74	+5.39
PS	François Colcombet	19,602	49.26	−5.39
Turnout		42,363	71.98	−4.15
RPR gain from PS				

=== 1988 ===
Legislative Election 1988: Allier's 1st constituency
Party	Candidate	Votes	%	±%
RPR	Jean-Paul Martin	15,802	40.41	−0.89
PS	François Colcombet	14,742	37.70	−1.36
PCF	Jean-Claude Mairal	6,538	16.72	−1.6
RN	Danièle de Salvert	2,019	5.16	
Turnout		39,918	67.97	−7.39
2nd round result
PS	François Colcombet	23,424	54.65	−1.39
RPR	Jean-Paul Martin	19,439	45.35	+1.39
Turnout		43,866	74.70	−5.87
PS hold				

=== 1981 ===
Candidate	Party	Alliance	First round			Second round		
Candidate	Party	Alliance	Votes	%	+/–	Votes	%	+/–
Hector Rolland (incumbent)	RPR	UNM	19,254	41.36	-3.17	21,744	43.96	-7.71
Jean-Paul Desgranges	PS		18,184	39.06	+14.62	27,717	56.04	N/A
Pierre Guillaumin	PCF		8,530	18.32	-7.32	WITHDREW		
Dominique Pin	Independent green		583	1.25				
Valid votes			46,551	99.03	+0.5	49,461	98.43	+0.77
Blank and Null votes			458	0.97	-0.5	791	1.57	-0.77
Turnout			47,009	75.36	-9.3	50,252	80.57	6.3
Abstentions			15,373	24.64	+9.3	12,119	19.43	+6.3
Registered voters			62,382			62,371		
Result						PS GAIN		

=== 1978 ===
Candidate	Party	Alliance	First round			Second round		
Candidate	Party	Alliance	Votes	%	+/–	Votes	%	+/–
Hector Rolland (incumbent)	RPR		22,759	44.53	+4.12	26,904	51.67	-0.32
Pierre Guillaumin	PCF		13,104	25.64	-0.27	25,163	48.33	+0.32
Jean-Paul Desgranges	PS		12,490	24.44	+1.44	WITHDREW		
Joseph Brat	Écologie 78		1,064	2.08				
Josiane Mainville	LO		902	1.76	-0.71			
Robert Boulet	ED		789	1.54				
Valid votes			51,108	98.53	+0.93	52,067	97.66	+1.52
Blank or Null votes			763	1.47	-0.93	1,247	2.34	-1.52
Turnout			51,871	84.66	+4.73	53,314	86.87	+4.65
Abstentions			9,398	15.34	-5.36	8,055	13.13	-4.65
Registered voters			61,269			61,269		
Result						RPR HOLD		

=== 1973 ===
Candidate	Party	Alliance	First round			Second round		
Candidate	Party	Alliance	Votes	%	+/–	Votes	%	+/–
Hector Rolland (incumbent)	UDR	URP	17,619	40.41	+8.47	22,966	51.99	-3.30
Jean Desgranges	PCF		11,300	25.91	-2.57	21,209	48.01	+3.30
Jean-Paul Desgranges	PS	UGSD	10,031	23.00		WITHDREW		
Roseline Desplats	Rad	MR	3,576	8.20				
Henri Peschaud	LO		1,079	2.47				
Valid votes			43,605	97.60	-0.78	44,175	96.14	-0.14
Blank or Null votes			1,070	2.40	-0.78	1,774	3.86	+0.14
Turnout			44,675	79.93	+1.90	45,949	82.22	+4.84
Abstentions			11,217	20.07	-1.90	9,934	17.78	-4.84
Registered voters			55,892			55,883		
Result						UDR HOLD		

=== 1968 ===
Candidate	Party	Alliance	First round			Second round		
Candidate	Party	Alliance	Votes	%	+/–	Votes	%	+/–
Hector Rolland	UDR	URP	13,473	31.94		22,632	55.29	
Jean Billaud	PCF		12,014	28.48	-3.78	18,304	44.71	-6.94
Jean Cluzel	CD	PDM	10,731	25.44	+0.89	WITHDREW		
Jean Bardin	CIR	FGDS	5,963	14.14	-1.33	WITHDREW		
Valid votes			42,181	98.38	+0.92	40,936	96.28	+0.92
Blank or Null votes			695	1.62	-0.92	1,582	3.72	-0.92
Turnout			42,876	78.03	+1.11	42,518	77.38	+1.06
Abstentions			12,071	21.97	-1.11	12,427	22.62	-1.06
Registered voters			54,947			54,945		
Result						UDR GAIN		

=== 1967 ===
Candidate	Party	Alliance	First round			Second round		
Candidate	Party	Alliance	Votes	%	+/–	Votes	%	+/–
Marcel Guyot (incumbent)	PCF		13,424	32.26	+4.51	20,867	51.65	+12.08
Paul Maridet	UD-Ve		11,534	27.72		19,530	48.35	
Jean Cluzel	CD	PDM	10,251	24.55		WITHDREW		
Pierre Lavau	CIR	FGDS	6,438	15.47		WITHDREW		
Valid votes			41,611	97.46	+0.01	40,397	95.36	-2.59
Blank or Null votes			1,086	2.54	-0.01	1,964	4.64	+2.59
Turnout			42,697	76.92	+16.00	42,361	76.32	+8.30
Abstentions			12,808	23.08	-16.00	13,145	23.68	-8.30
Registered voters			55,505			55,506		
Result						PCF HOLD		

=== 1962 ===
Candidate	Party	Alliance	First round			Second round		
Candidate	Party	Alliance	Votes	%	+/–	Votes	%	+/–
Marcel Guyot	PCF		9,192	27.75		14,700	39.57	
Paul Maridet (incumbent)	UNR-UDT		8,062	24.34	-0.80	12,831	34.53	-15.67
Jacques Pligot	RI		7,203	21.75		9,623	25.90	
Robert Marjolin	SFIO		5,292	15.98	-7.12	WITHDREW		
Pierre Ferière	Radcent		1,937	5.85	+4.25	WITHDREW		
René Boyer	MRP		1,436	4.34	-11.07			
Valid votes			33,122	97.45	-0.23	37,154	97.95	-0.75
Blank or Null votes			865	2.55	+0.23	776	2.05	+0.76
Turnout			33,987	60.92	-8.90	37,930	68.02	-3.79
Abstentions			21,798	39.08	+8.90	17,831	31.98	3.79
Registered voters			55,785			55,761		
Result						PCF GAIN		

=== 1958 ===
Candidate	Party	Alliance	First round			Second round		
Candidate	Party	Alliance	Votes	%	+/–	Votes	%	+/–
Paul Maridet	Moderates		9,680	25.14		20,090	50.20	
Gilles Gozard	SFIO		8,896	23.10		9,201	22.99	
Marcel Pouyet	SKU		8,832	22.93		10,731	26.81	
René Boyer	MRP		5,934	15.41		WITHDREW		
André Noguès	UFD		2,651	6.88		WITHDREW		
Pierre Dubois	UFF		1,901	4.94				
Robert Cherrier	Radsoc		615	1.60				
Valid votes			38,509	97.68		40,022	98.70	
Blank or Null votes			915	2.32		526	1.30	
Turnout			39,424	69.82		40,548	71.81	
Abstentions			17,045	30.18		15,914	28.19	
Registered voters			56,469			56,462		
Result						MODERATES GAIN		

== Sources ==
- Official results of French elections from 1998: "Résultats électoraux officiels en France" (in French). Archived from the original on 20 December 2011.
