= Pierre-André Périssol =

French politician

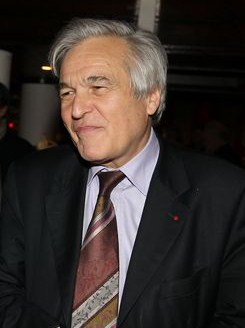

Mayor of Moulins
- In office 25 June 1995 – 22 March 2026
- Preceded by: Paul Chouvat
- Succeeded by: Benoit Faivre

Member of the National Assembly for Allier's 1st constituency
- In office 19 June 2002 – 19 June 2007
- Preceded by: François Colcombet
- Succeeded by: Guy Chambefort

Minister of Housing
- In office 1995–1997
- President: Jacques Chirac
- Prime Minister: Alain Juppé
- Preceded by: Hervé de Charette
- Succeeded by: Louis Besson

Personal details
- Born: 30 April 1947 (age 79) Nice, France
- Party: The Republicans
- Education: École Polytechnique

Pierre-André Périssol (born 30 April 1947) is a French politician, former Minister of Housing, and former Deputy in the National Assembly of France. Périssol served as the mayor of Moulins, Allier from 1995 to 2026.

In June 2010 Périssol was named president of the French Development Agency.
