= Gérard Dériot =

French politician (1944–2024)

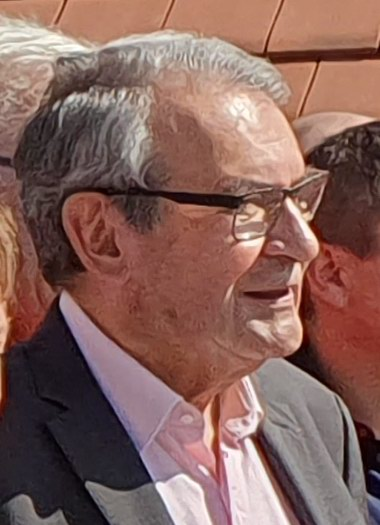
- Dériot in 2019

French Senator from Allier
- In office 1 October 1998 – 30 September 2020
- Preceded by: Jean Cluzel
- Succeeded by: Bruno Rojouan

President of the Departmental Council of Allier (General Council until 2015)
- In office 2 April 2015 – 25 September 2017
- Preceded by: Jean-Paul Dufrègne
- Succeeded by: Claude Riboulet
- In office 23 March 2001 – 20 March 2008
- Preceded by: Jean-Claude Mairal
- Succeeded by: Jean-Paul Dufrègne
- In office 3 April 1992 – 27 March 1998
- Preceded by: Jean Cluzel
- Succeeded by: Jean-Claude Mairal

Mayor of Cérilly
- In office 18 June 1995 – 18 March 2001
- Preceded by: Georges Friaud
- Succeeded by: Olivier Filliat

Personal details
- Born: 1 November 1944 Louroux-Hodement, France
- Died: 10 June 2024 (aged 79) Montluçon, France
- Party: The Republicans
- Profession: Pharmacist

Gérard Dériot (1 November 1944 – 10 June 2024) was a French politician who was a member of the Senate. He represented the Allier department and was a member of the Union for a Popular Movement Party.

== Biography ==
Dériot was president of the General council of Allier from 1992 to 1998 and from 2001 to 2008, and of the Departmental Council of Allier from 2 April 2015 to 25 September 2017.

- President of the communes community (communauté de communes) of Pays de Tronçais
- Former mayor of Cérilly
- General councillor of former canton of Cérilly (1985–2015)
- Departmental councillor of canton of Bourbon-l'Archambault (duo with Corinne Trebosc-Coupas)

Dériot died on 10 June 2024, at the age of 79.
