= Arrondissements of the Allier department =

Map of arrondissements of the Allier department.

The 3 arrondissements of the Allier department are:

1. Arrondissement of Montluçon, (subprefecture: Montluçon) with 90 communes. The population of the arrondissement was 105,280 in 2021.
2. Arrondissement of Moulins, (prefecture of the Allier department: Moulins) with 67 communes. The population of the arrondissement was 76,316 in 2021.
3. Arrondissement of Vichy, (subprefecture: Vichy) with 160 communes. The population of the arrondissement was 153,276 in 2021.

== History ==
In 1800 the arrondissements of Moulins, Gannat, Lapalisse and Montluçon were established. The arrondissement of Gannat was disbanded in 1926. In 1941 Vichy replaced Lapalisse as subprefecture.

The borders of the arrondissements of Allier were modified in January 2017:

- 14 communes from the arrondissement of Montluçon to the arrondissement of Vichy
- three communes from the arrondissement of Moulins to the arrondissement of Vichy
- one commune from the arrondissement of Vichy to the arrondissement of Moulins

The borders of the arrondissements of Allier were modified again in January 2024:

- two communes from the arrondissement of Moulins to the arrondissement of Montluçon
- one commune from the arrondissement of Montluçon to the arrondissement of Moulins
- 41 communes from the arrondissement of Moulins to the arrondissement of Vichy
