= Coulanges, Allier =

Coulanges
- Commune
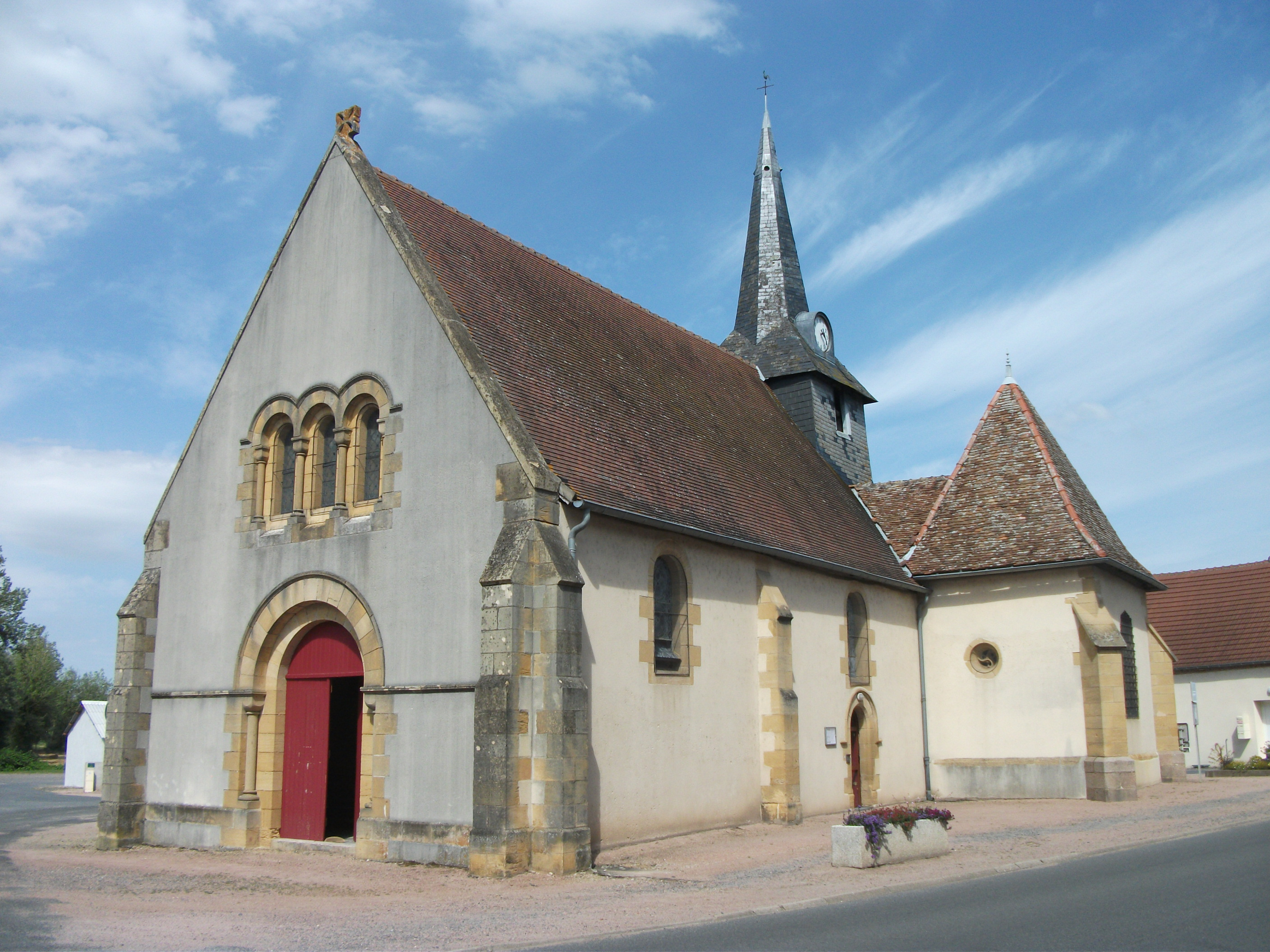
- Church
- Location of Coulanges
- Location within France Location within Auvergne-Rhône-Alpes
- Coordinates: 46°29′09″N 3°51′38″E
- Country: France
- Region: Auvergne-Rhône-Alpes
- Department: Allier
- Arrondissement: Vichy
- Canton: Dompierre-sur-Besbre
- Intercommunality: Le Grand Charolais

Government
  - Mayor (2026–32): Eric Gourlier
- Area^{1}: 23.96 km^{2} (9.25 sq mi)
- Elevation: 228 m (748 ft)
- Highest elevation: 278 m (912 ft)
- Lowest elevation: 216 m (709 ft)
- Population (2023): 285
  - Density: 11.9/km^{2} (30.8/sq mi)
- Time zone: UTC+01:00 (CET)
  - Summer (DST): UTC+02:00 (CEST)
- INSEE/Postal code: 03086 /03470
- ^{1} French Land Register data, which excludes lakes, ponds, glaciers > 1 km^{2} (0.386 sq mi or 247 acres) and river estuaries.

Coulanges (French pronunciation: [kulɑ̃ʒ]) is a commune in the Allier department in central France.

== Population ==
Historical population
| Year | Pop. | ±% p.a. |
|---|---|---|
| 1968 | 460 | — |
| 1975 | 419 | −1.32% |
| 1982 | 329 | −3.40% |
| 1990 | 339 | +0.37% |
| 1999 | 308 | −1.06% |
| 2007 | 315 | +0.28% |
| 2012 | 315 | +0.00% |
| 2017 | 354 | +2.36% |
| 2023 | 285 | −3.55% |
Source: INSEE

== See also ==
- Communes of the Allier department
