= Saint-Saturnin Church of Cusset =

Saint-Saturnin Church
- Église Saint-Saturnin de Cusset
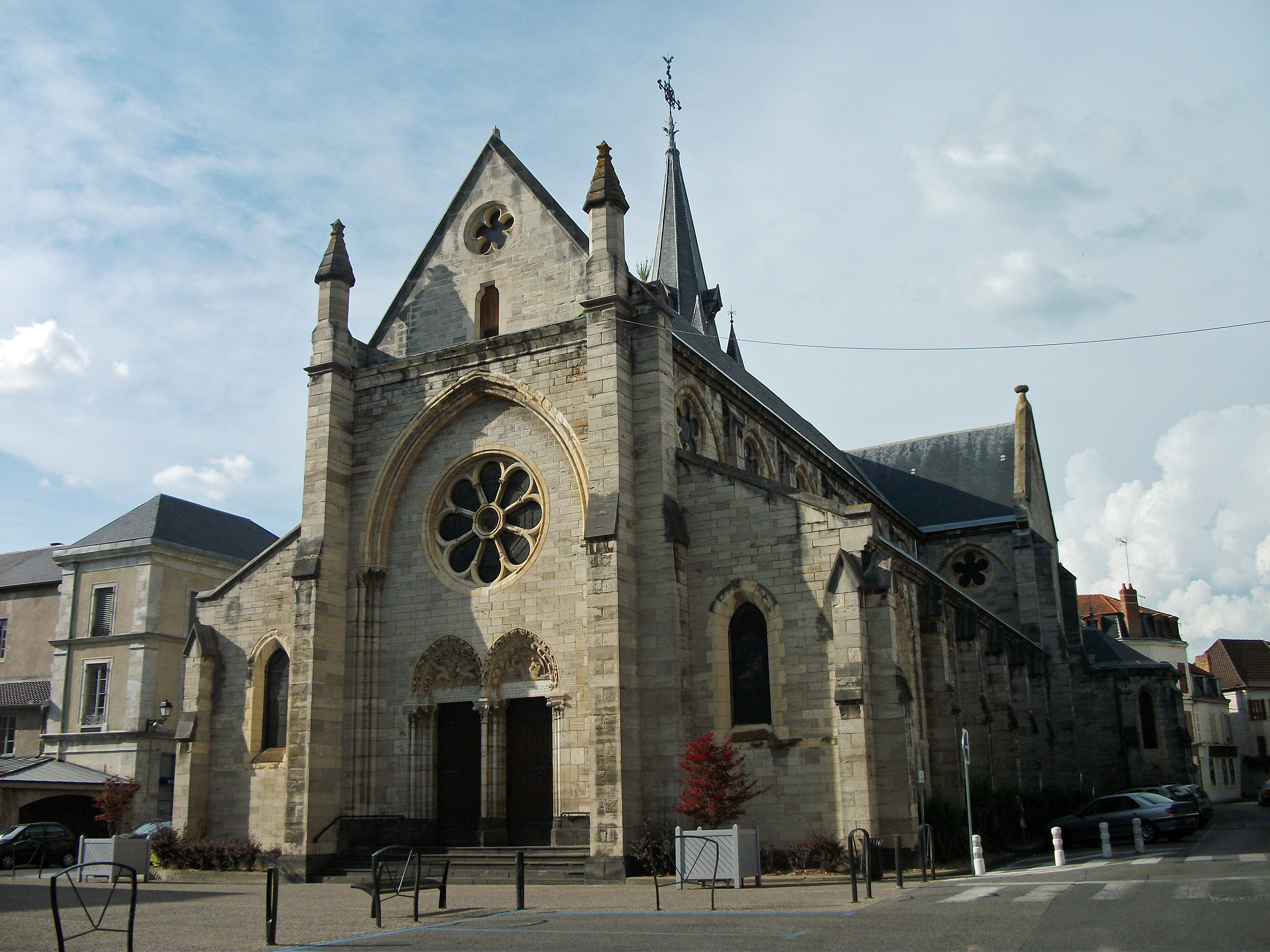
- Saint-Saturnin in 2014
- Saint-Saturnin Church
- 46°7′55″N 3°27′26″E
- Location: Cusset, Allier, France
- Address: 1 Pl. Radoult de Lafosse, 03300 Cusset, France
- Country: France
- Denomination: Roman Catholic

Architecture
- Architect(s): Jean-Baptiste Lassus and later Hugues Batilliat
- Years built: 1857-1867

The Church of Saint Saturnin in Cusset is a church located in the town center of Cusset, France. It was built between 1857 and 1867 in an early Gothic style, and still functions as the city's main religious building today.

== History ==
A Romanesque church dedicated to Saint Saturnin was built at the end of the 11th century on this location, the heart of the royal city that was then Cusset. It was remodeled in the Gothic period. The city municipality decided in 1857 to have it demolished because it was considered too dilapidated and too cramped to maintain, opting for a new church to be built instead. The construction of a new church building was entrusted to Jean-Baptiste Lassus, a renowned Parisian architect and specialist in Middle Ages architecture from whom he had already taken inspiration for the construction of other churches. For the Cusset church, he was inspired by the Gothic style of the early 13th century. Shortly after Jean-Baptiste Lassus arrived in the area in 1857, he died at the age of fifty. The architect Hugues Batilliat from the neighboring town of Vichy took up his plans a few years later in 1861, and the church was completed in 1867.

Napoleon III, who frequented the nearby spa resort of Vichy and visited Cusset in 1861 or 1862, financed the construction of the bell tower.

The church's first mass was celebrated on August 15, 1867, and was consecrated the following year on May 16, 1868, by Monseigneur de Dreux-Brézé, the bishop of the diocese of Moulins.

The building was decreed a historic monument on February 26, 2013, the protection covering the entire church including its altars, pulpit, and all other fixed elements.

== Description ==
The church is built on a basilical plan out of limestone from quarries in the region, with a square, spire-topped bell tower attached to the west transept. The six-bay nave is lined with two side aisles and faces north, with a non-protruding transept, a choir loft, and chapels. This unusual orientation is due to the urban density in Cusset at the time of the church's construction.

Inside the church, the high ribbed vaults of the nave fall on massive circular columns with capitals. The decor consists of capitals individually sculpted with unique decorations, corbels of falling arches inspired by the sketches of Villard de Honnecourt, a master of medieval architecture in the thirteenth century, and the tympanums of the exterior and interior doors, by sculptures of Saint Saturnin blessing a bell and King David playing the harp. Natural lighting is provided by oculi with rosette tracery pierced in the heights of the nave and pointed arch bays pierced in the side aisle walls.

The stained glass windows are the work of the Auvergne master glassmaker Émile Thibaud with great diversity in the iconography. The furniture– pulpit, confessionals, gallery staircase, sacristy furniture– is mainly composed of neo-Gothic style elements in polished wood.

== Gallery ==
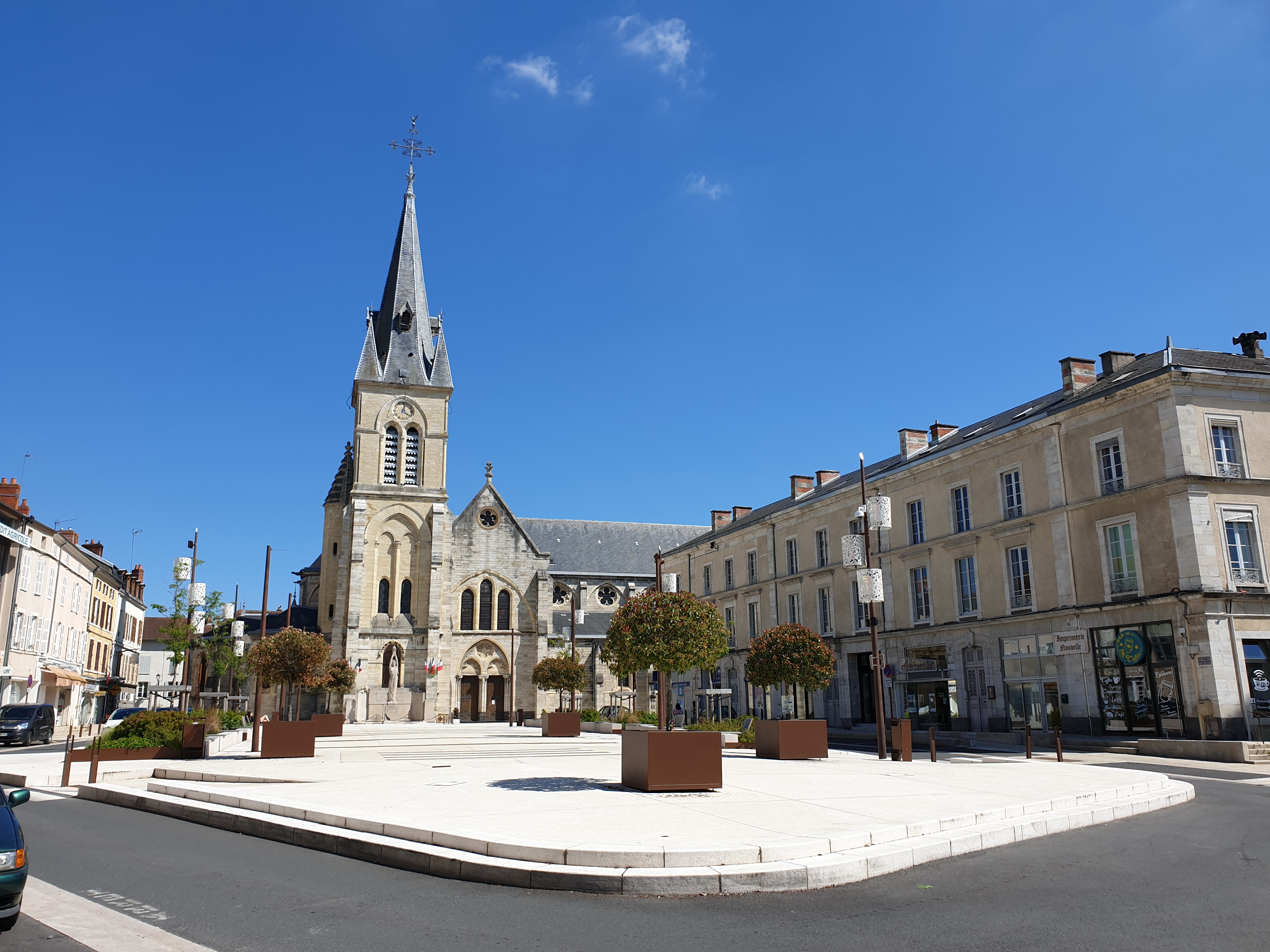
Place Victor-Hugo, the central and historic square of Cusset and the Saint-Saturnin Church

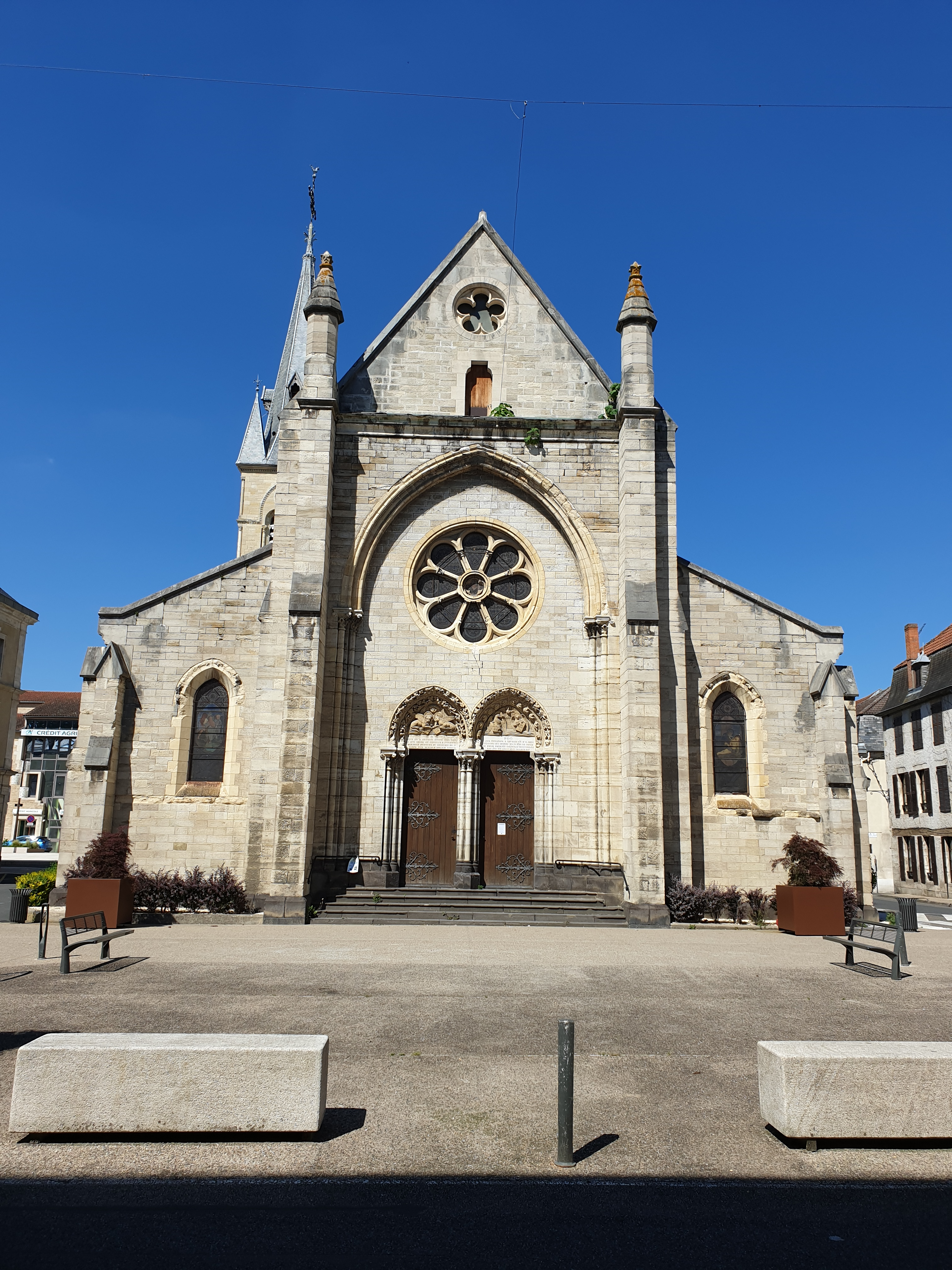
The square and main entrance to the church, place Radoult-de-Lafosse

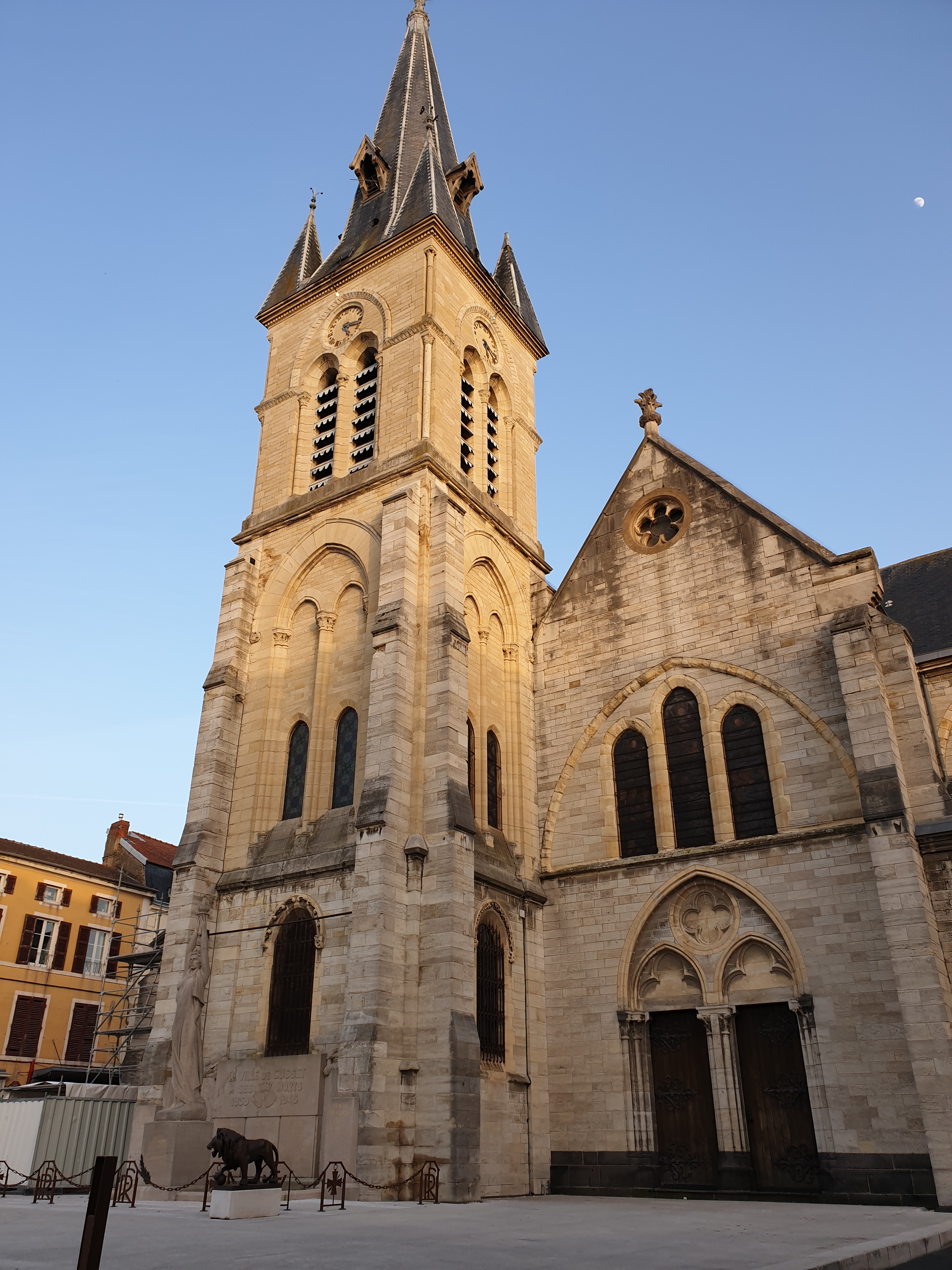
The bell tower

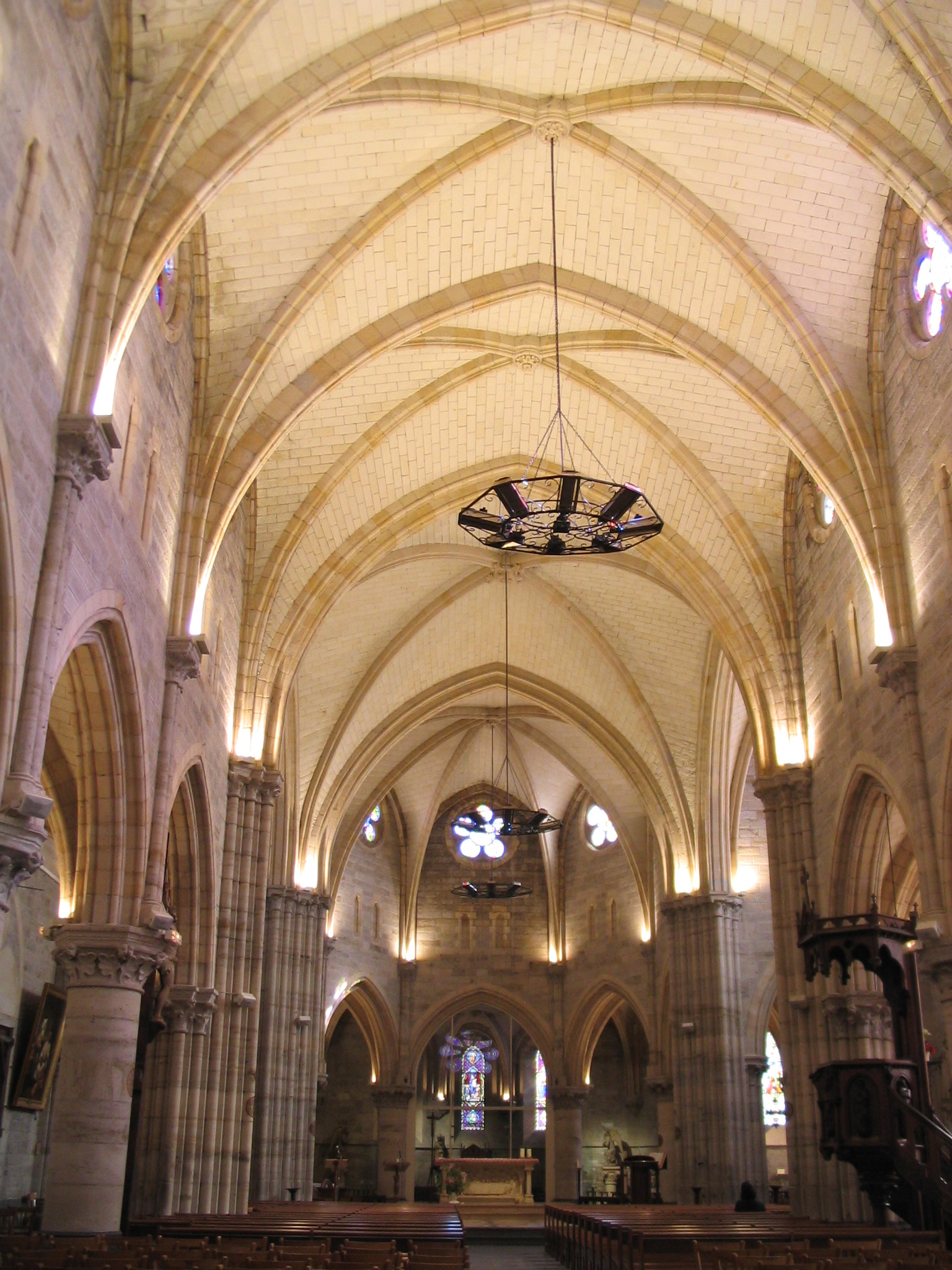
The church nave
