= Jean-Paul Dufrègne =

French politician (born 1958)

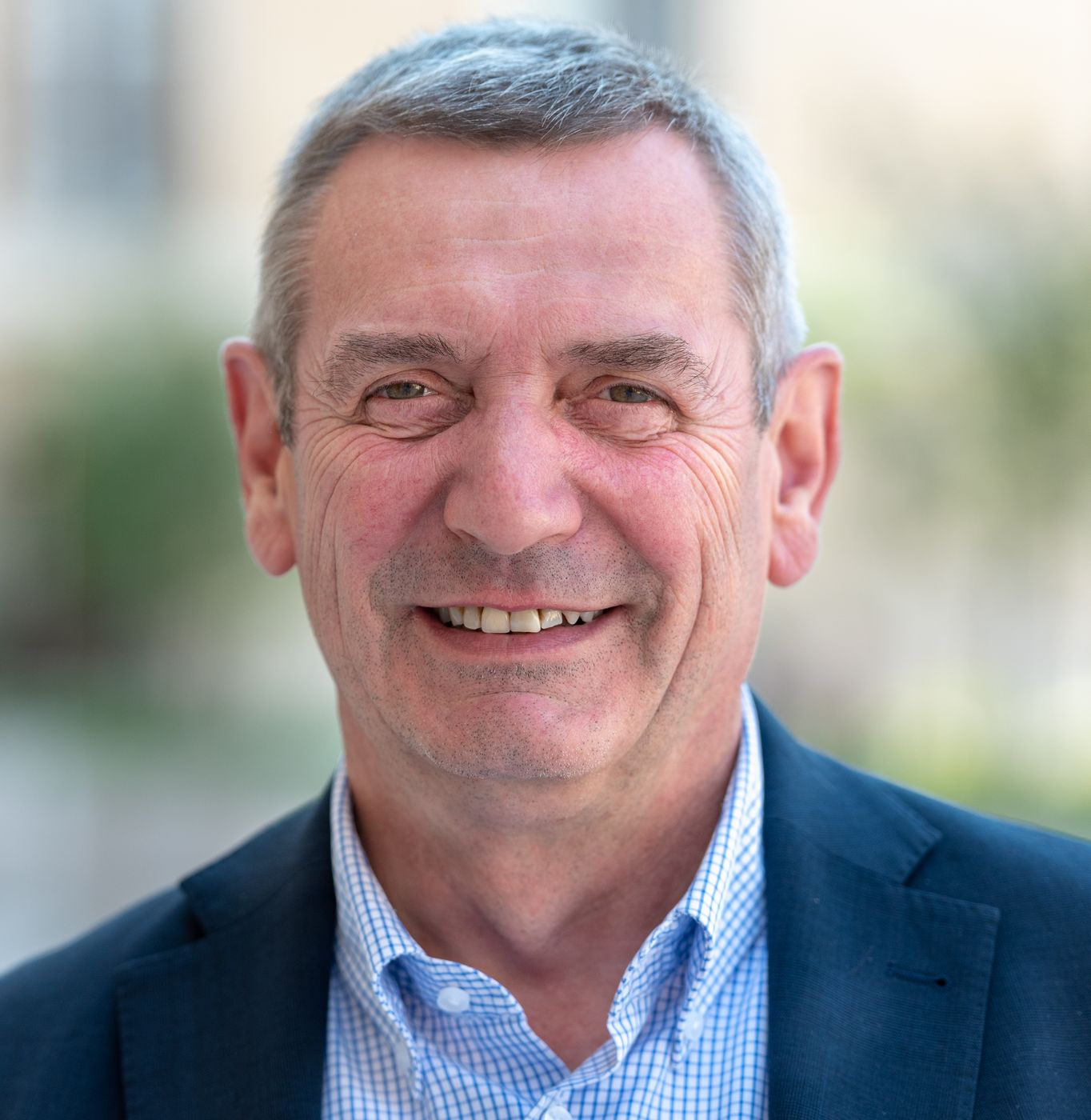

Member of the National Assembly for Allier's 1st constituency
- In office 21 June 2017 – 19 June 2022
- Preceded by: Guy Chambefort
- Succeeded by: Yannick Monnet

Personal details
- Born: 28 March 1958 (age 68) Saint-Menoux, France
- Party: Parti communiste français

Jean-Paul Dufrègne (born 28 March 1958) is a French politician representing the French Communist Party. He was French National Assembly deputy from 18 June 2017 to 19 June 2022, representing the department of Allier.

== See also ==
- 2017 French legislative election
- 2022 French legislative election
