= Louis de Chantemerle =

Gaspard Laurent Louis Jacquelot de Chantemerle
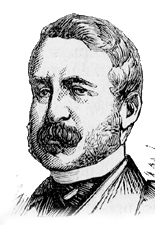

Senator of Allier
- In office 30 January 1876 – 24 January 1885

Personal details
- Born: 16 February 1818 Coulanges, Allier, France
- Died: 12 February 1893 (aged 74) Saint-Raphaël, Var, France
- Occupation: Magistrate, politician

Gaspard Laurent Louis Jacquelot de Chantemerle (16 February 1818 – 12 February 1893) was a French magistrate and politician who was Senator of Allier from 1876 to 1885.

== Early years ==
Gaspard Laurent Louis Jacquelot de Chantemerle was born in Coulanges, Allier, on 16 February 1818. His parents were Gaspard Louis Jacquelot de Chantemerle (1783–1818) and Marie Antoinette Préveraud de La Boutresse. He married twice, but had no children. His first wife, whom he married on 27 December 1854, was Alix de Saint Phalle (1832–71). His second wife was Marie Laure de Réhez de Sampigny (1833–1920). He became a justice of the peace in Ligny, Allier. He was chosen as Mayor of Cindré and representative of the canton of Ligny in the Allier General Council. He lived in the small Château Verger near Trézelles, apparently dated to before 1511 and relatively unchanged, before moving to a more modern house when a senator.

== Senator ==
De Chantemerle was Senator of Allier from 30 January 1876 to 24 January 1885. He was elected on 30 January 1876 by 203 conservative votes out of 388 voters. He voted for dissolution of the Chamber of Deputies in 1877, for the government of Albert de Broglie during the 16 May 1877 crisis, against the Ministry of Jules Armand Dufaure in 1879, against Article 7 and the laws on education in 1880, against the new law on the judicial oath in 1882, against the reform of the judiciary in 1883 and against the reestablishment of divorce in 1884.

De Chantemerle failed to be reelected in the partial renewal of the Senate on 6 January 1885, winning 286 votes against 422 for Joseph Chantemille, who gained the lowest number of votes on the Republican list. After this de Chantemerle retired from political life. He died in Saint-Raphaël, Var, on 12 February 1893.

== Sources ==
- de CHANTEMERLE Louis (in French), Senat de France
- Faige, G. Émile Aubert de la; Boutresse, Roger Prévéraud de la (1896), Les fiefs du Bourbonnais: La Palisse (in French), E. Plon, Nourrit et Cie
- Jolly, Jean, ed. (1960), "CHANTEMERLE (Louis, GASPARD, LAURENT JACQUELOT DE)", Dictionnaire des parlementaires français de 1889 à 1940, Presses universitaires de France
- Pierfit, "Gaspard Laurent Louis JACQUELOT de CHANTEMERLE", Geneanet
- Robert, Adolphe; Cougny, Gaston (1889–1891), "CHANTEMERLE (LOUIS-GASPARD-LAURENT-JACQUELOT DE)", in Edgar Bourloton (ed.), Dictionnaire des Parlementaires français (1789–1889) (in French)
