= Yannick Monnet =

French politician

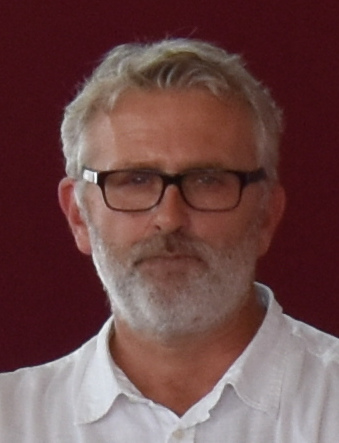
- Monnet in 2023

Member of the 16th National Assembly of France
- In office 22 June 2022 – 9 June 2024
- Preceded by: Jean-Paul Dufrègne
- Constituency: Allier's 1st constituency

Regional councillor for Auvergne-Rhône-Alpes
- Incumbent
- Assumed office 27 June 2021

Personal details
- Born: 7 October 1975 (age 50) Moulins, Allier
- Party: French Communist Party
- Other political affiliations: NUPES

Yannick Monnet (born 7 October 1975) is a French politician. He is a member of the French Communist Party (PCF) and, since June 2022, a member of the 16th National Assembly of France representing Allier's 1st constituency.

== Career ==
Monnet has been a member of the PCF since 1995, when he was 19.

In 2021, he was elected to the Regional Council of Auvergne-Rhône-Alpes.

In the 2022 legislative elections, Monnet stood for election in Allier's 1st constituency for the PCF under the NUPES alliance. He came first in the first round with 30.6% of the vote, and was elected in the second round with 55.5% of the vote.
