= Château de Chantemerle =

Ruined castle in La Bâthie, Savoie, France

Coordinates: 45.6386°N 6.4456°E

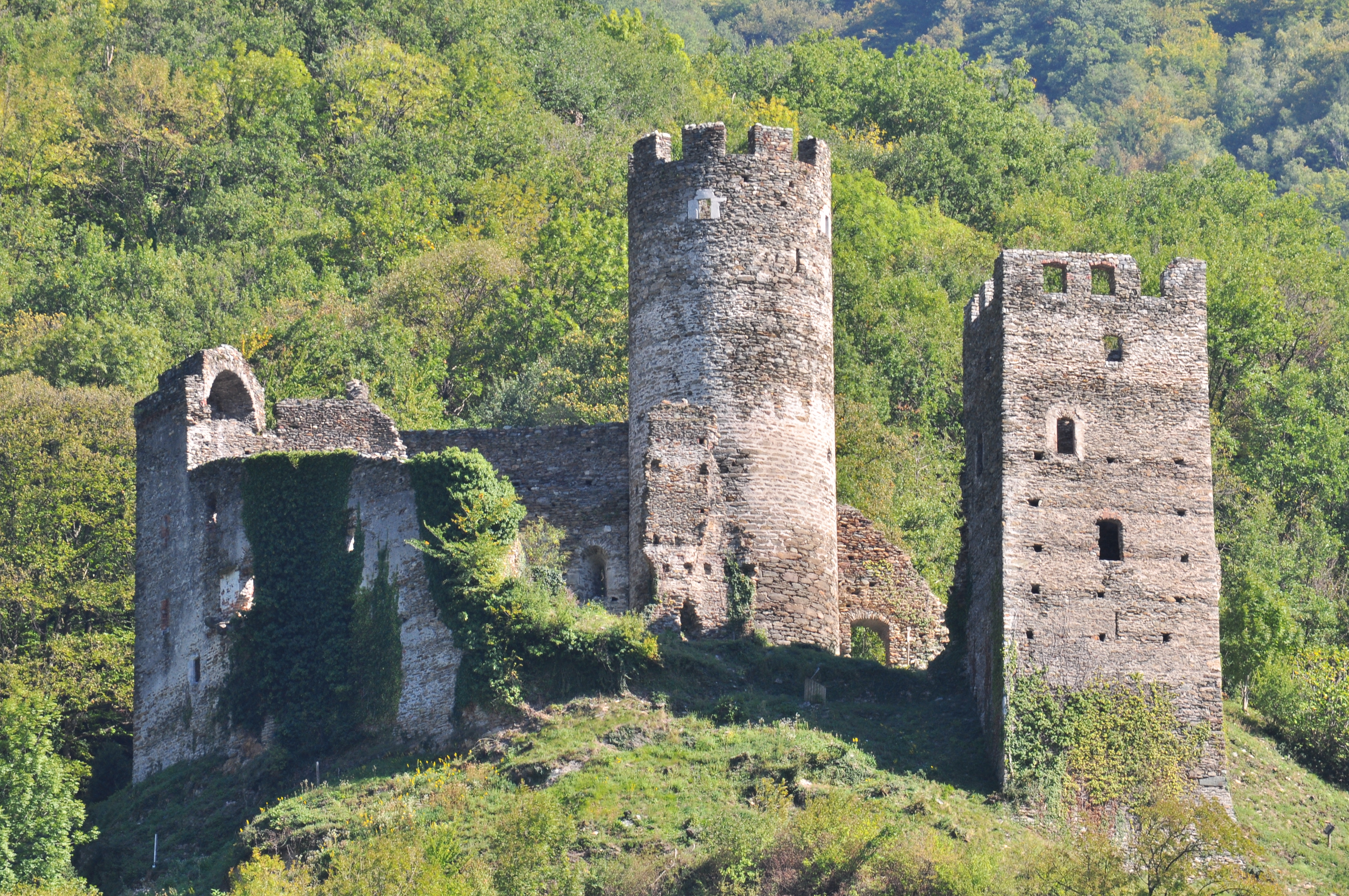
The castle in 2011

The Château de Chantemerle is a ruined castle in the commune of La Bâthie in the Savoie département of France. It is also known locally as Château de Saint-Didier.

== Position ==
The castle is sited on the edge of a rocky crest, dominating the hamlet of Chantemerle and the Isère valley.

== History ==
The castle is known from documentary sources in 1196. It was rebuilt in the 13th century. In the 14th century, it was adapted for defence against fire arms with new entrances, arrowslits converted to windows, and machicolations destroyed. These alterations were made in brick.

Around 1263, the archbishop of Tarentaise decided to move the canons to Moûtiers. There, in what is now the sector of Albertville, a conflict erupted between the Count of Savoy and the archbishop around the rights of each to the sector of Cléry. Thus, the archbishop, wanting to stamp his authority on this territory and considering himself threatened by the Count's advances, decided to build a castle at Bathie in the lower Tarentaise valley, around which he completely reorganised a châtelain. He also profited from this by joining Cléry to this new archepiscopal châtelain, for the benefit of the men and properties dependent on him.

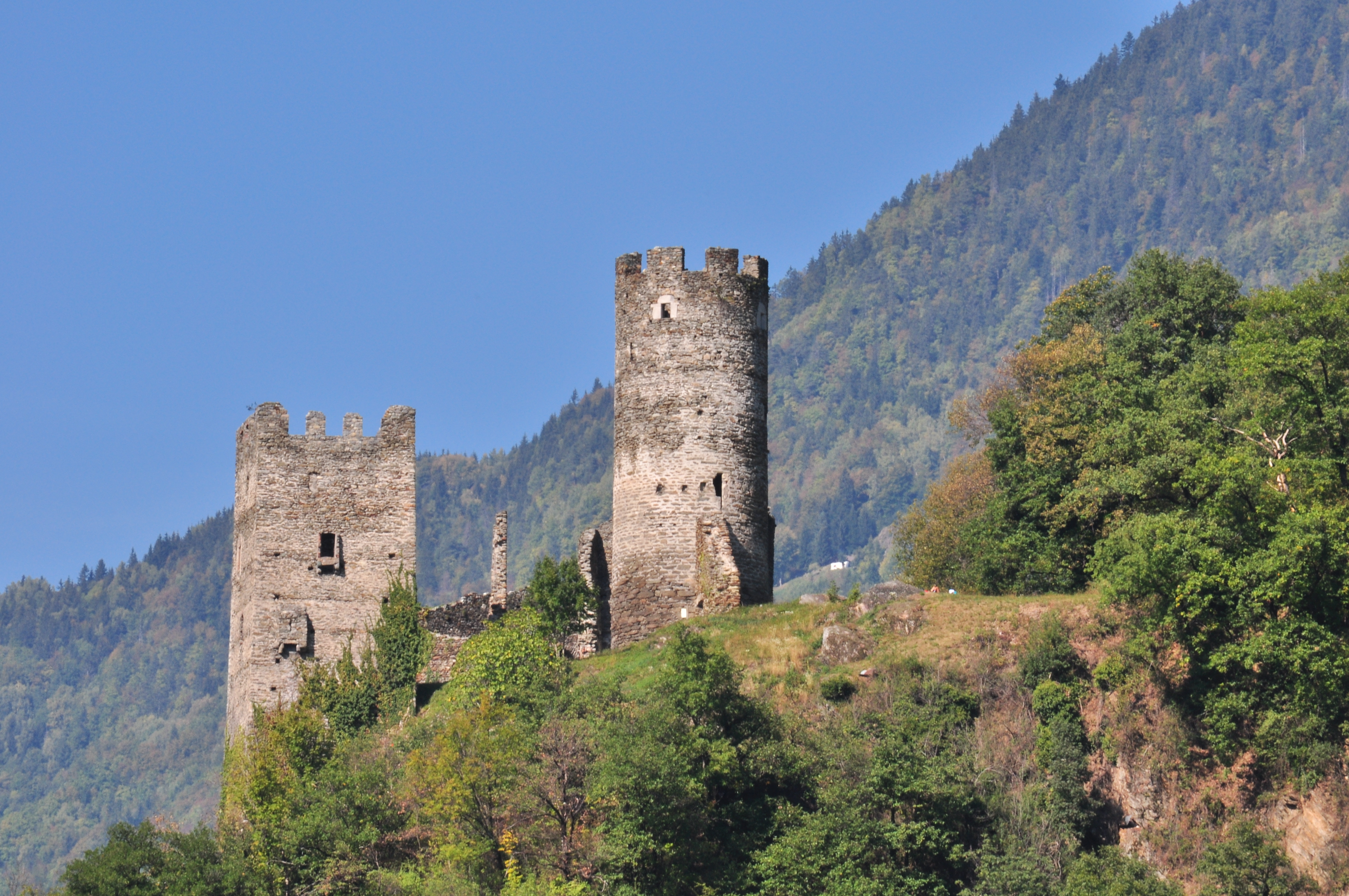

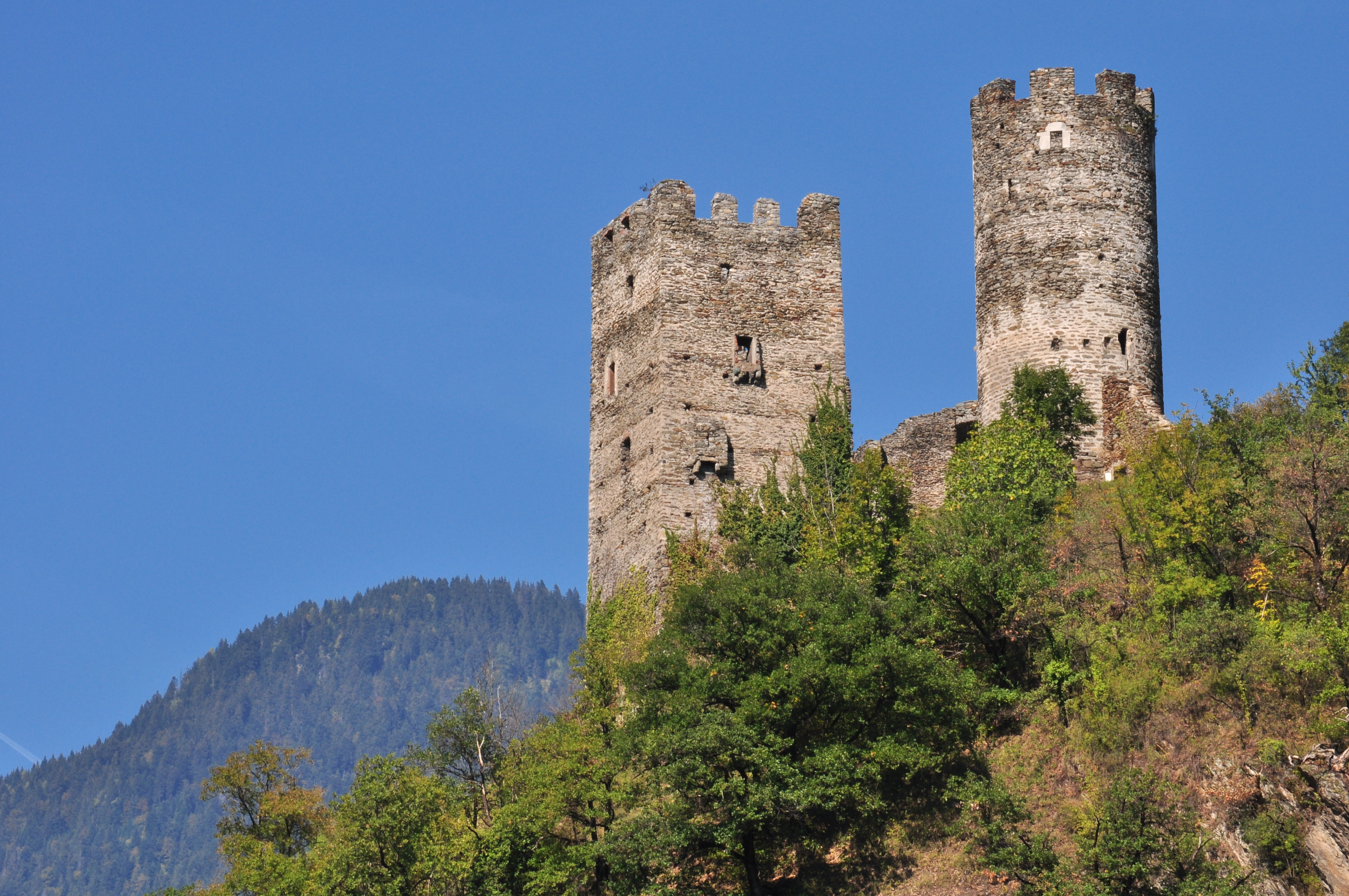

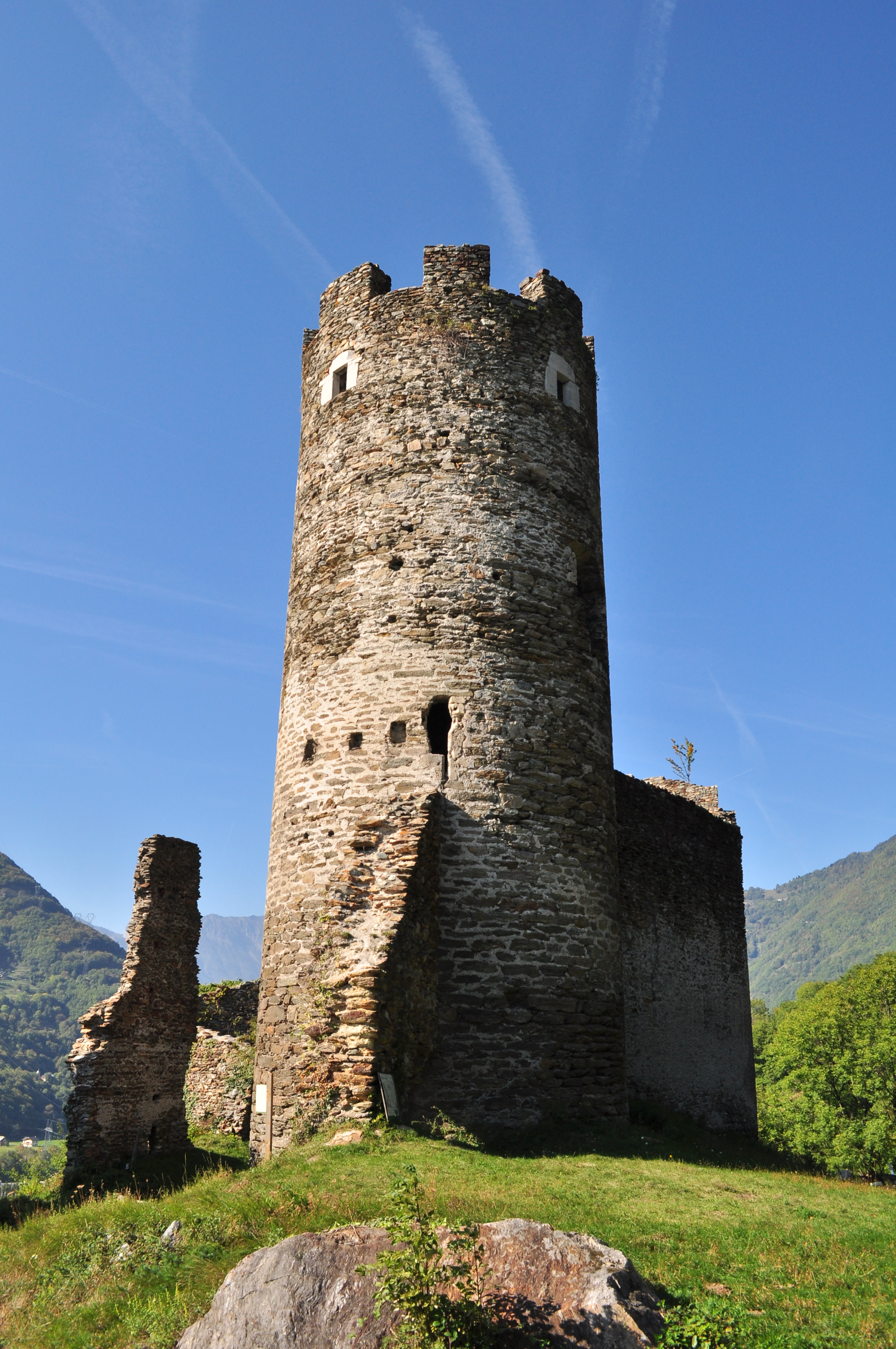

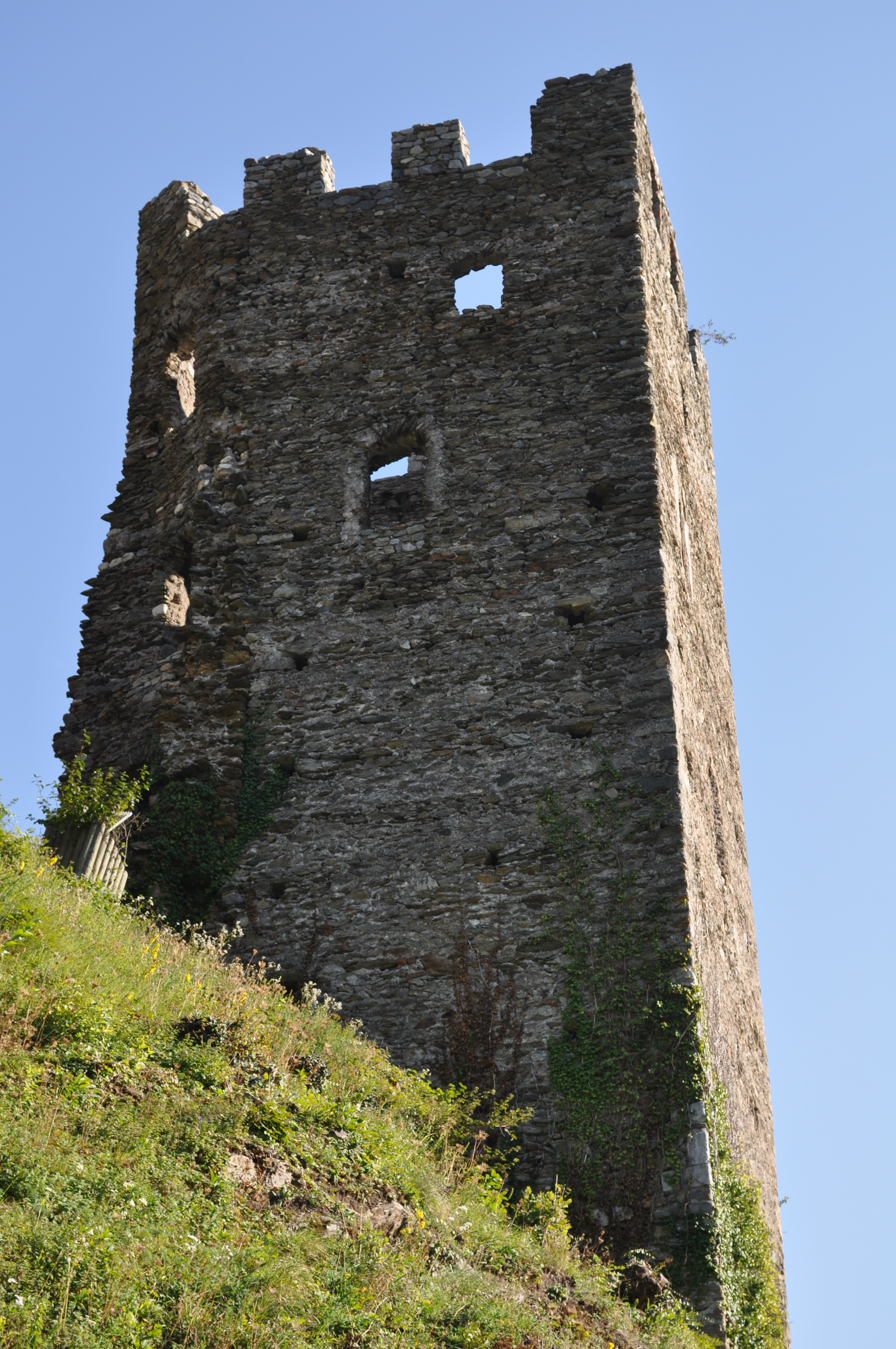

== Description ==
The castle consists of a polygonal enceinte enclosing a cylindrical keep, 8.5 meters in diameter and 22m high. Constructed from stone rubble, it is divided into five floored levels. The top floor is the only one to be lit; the others are pierced by arrowslits in niches. In a corner of the curtain wall, slightly lower, is a second, square, tower. Habitable and measuring 8.5 m square, it is divided like the keep into five floored levels, lit by rectangular windows. Heavily thickened at the base, its walls are 22.8 m high and 1.55 m thick. Various buildings attached to the ramparts are spread around the courtyard.

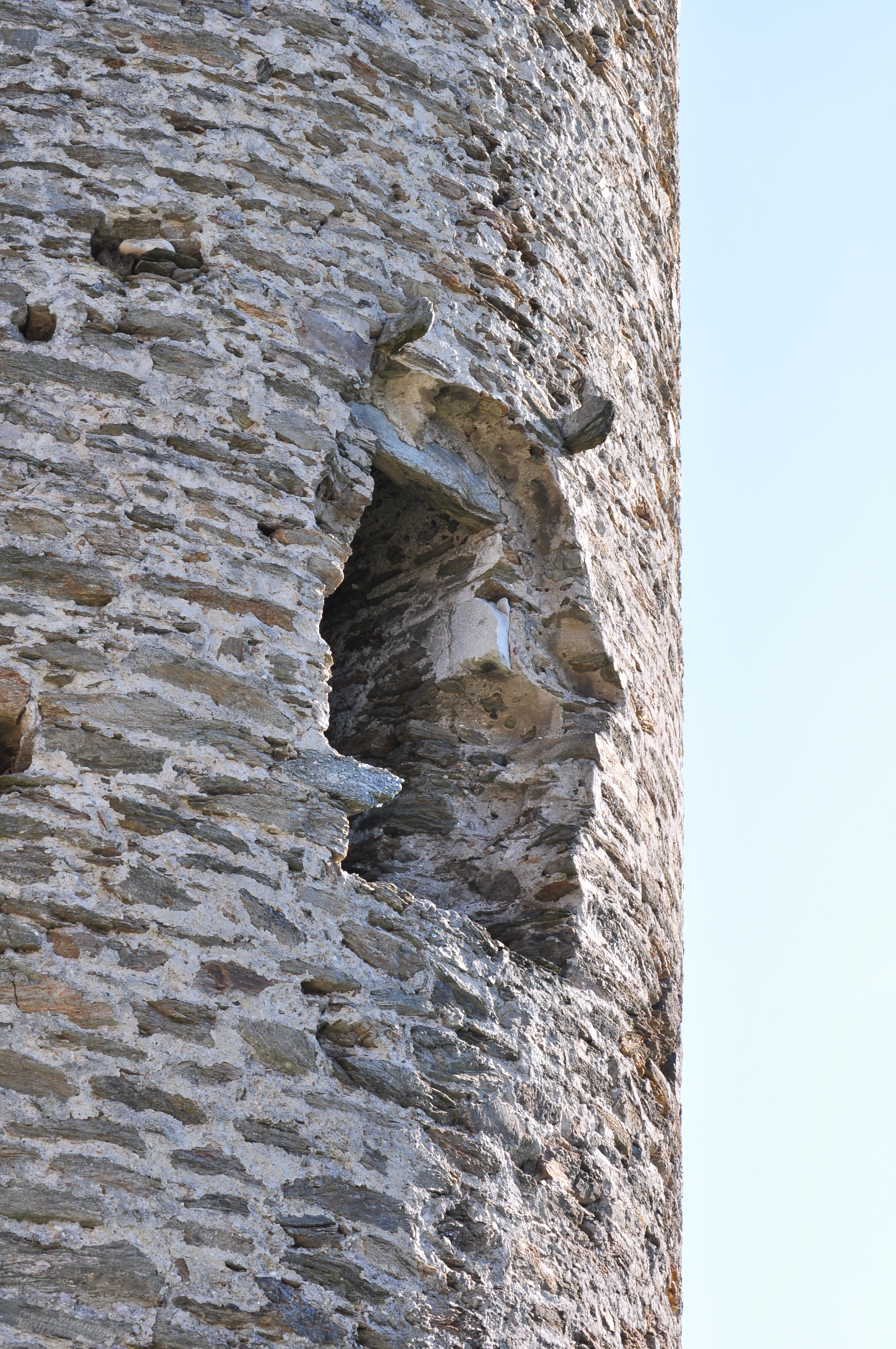
Doorway to the keep

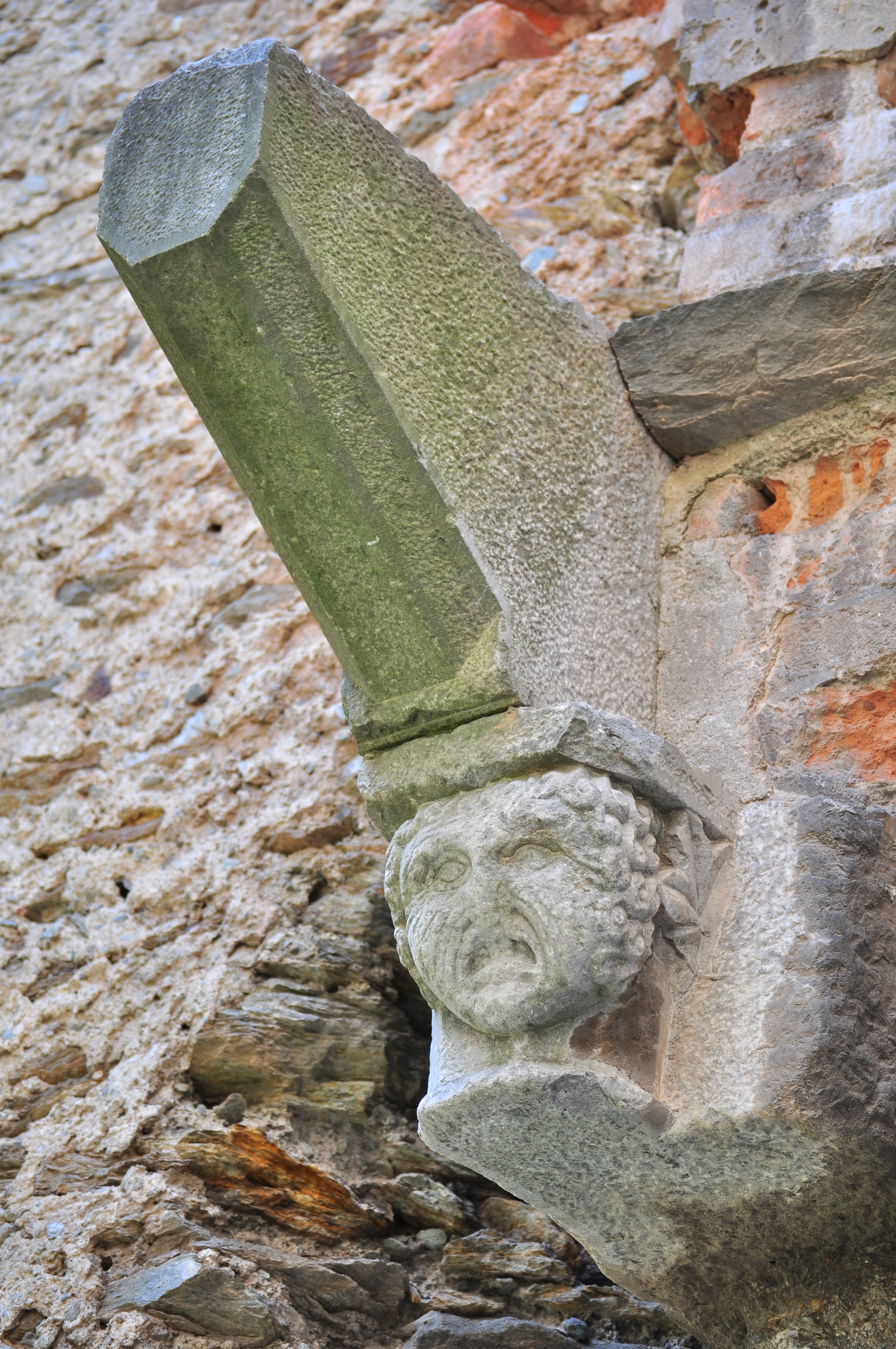
Chimney console

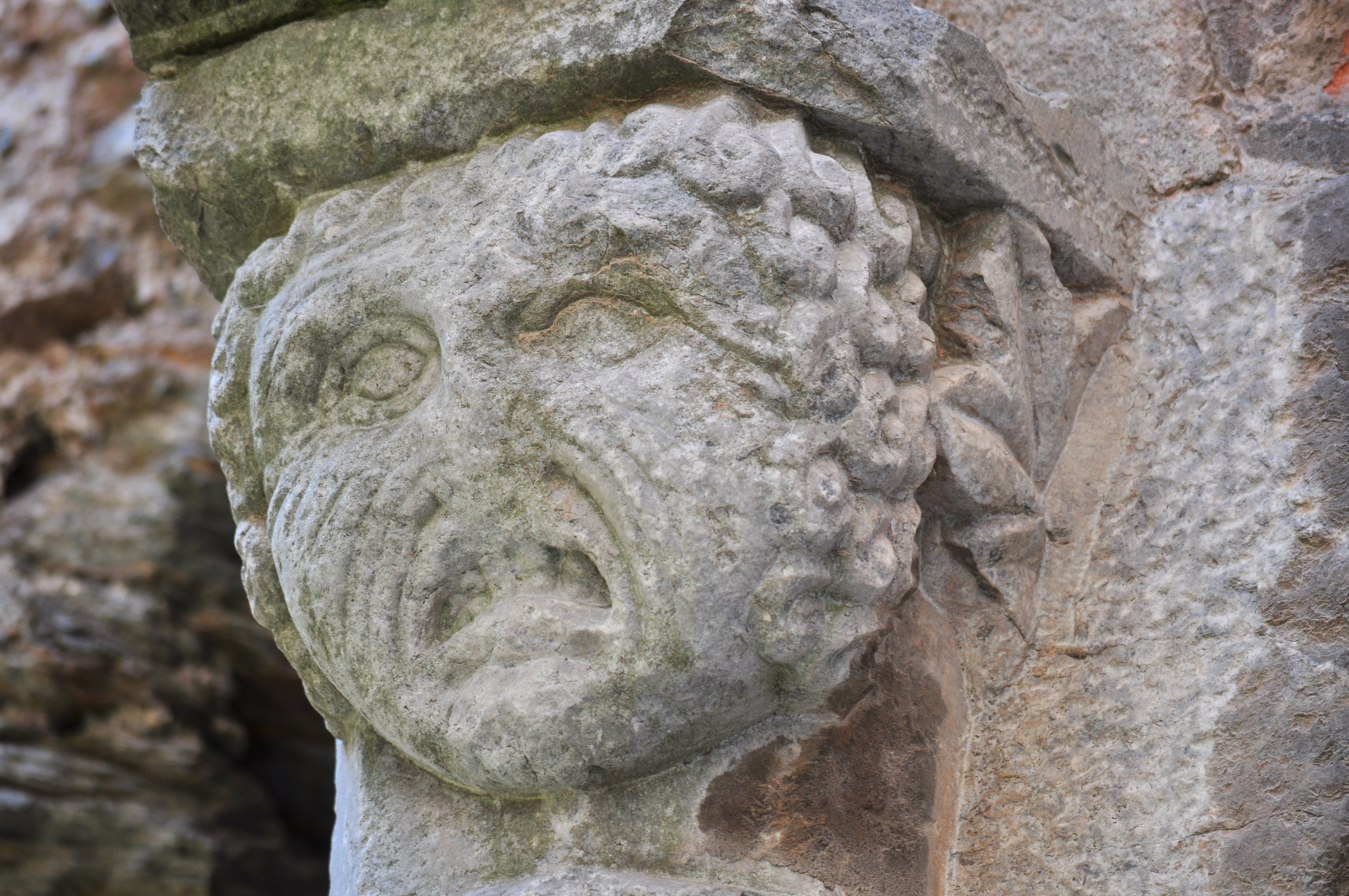
Detail of sculpted capitals

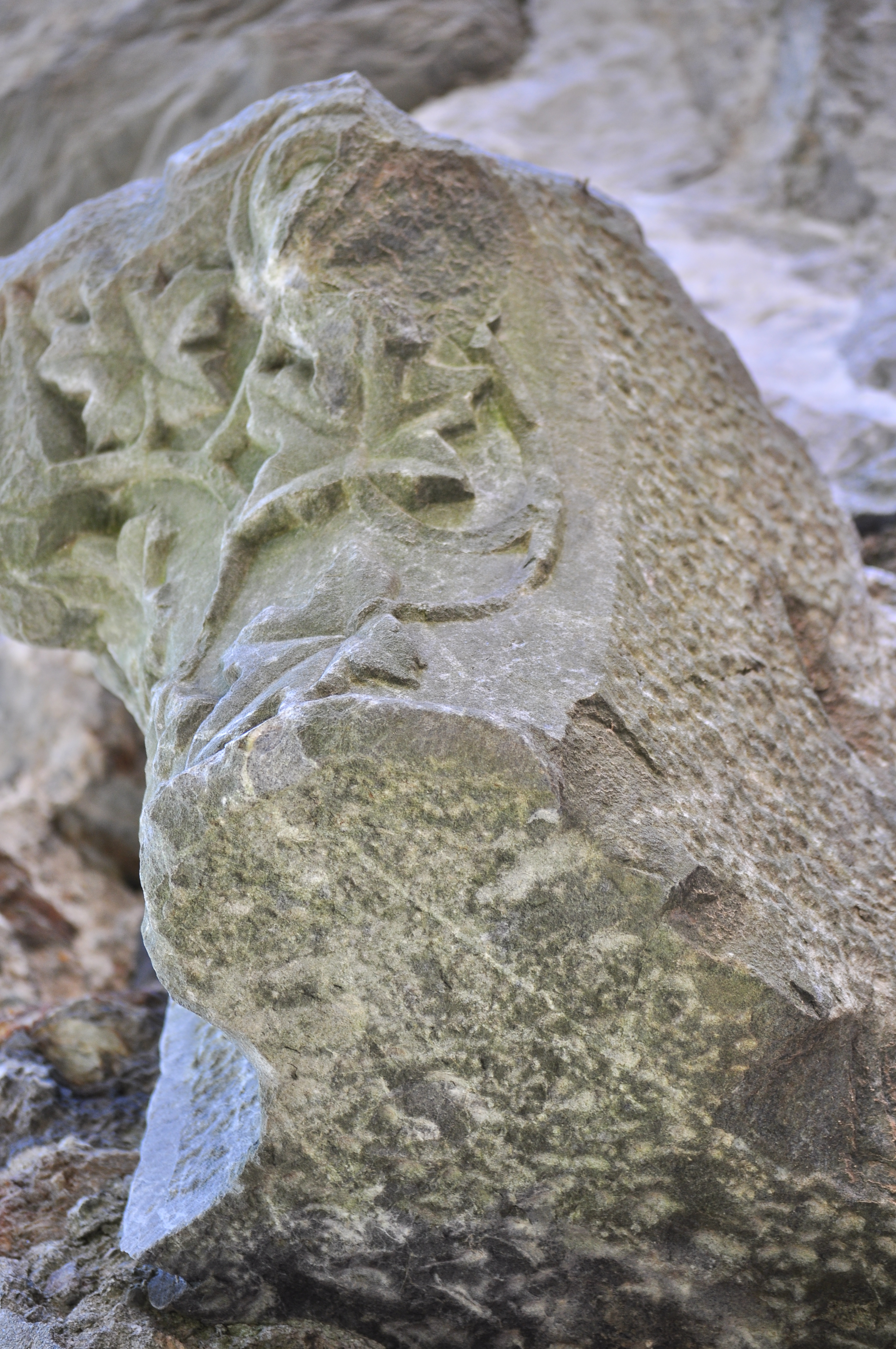
Detail of sculpted capitals

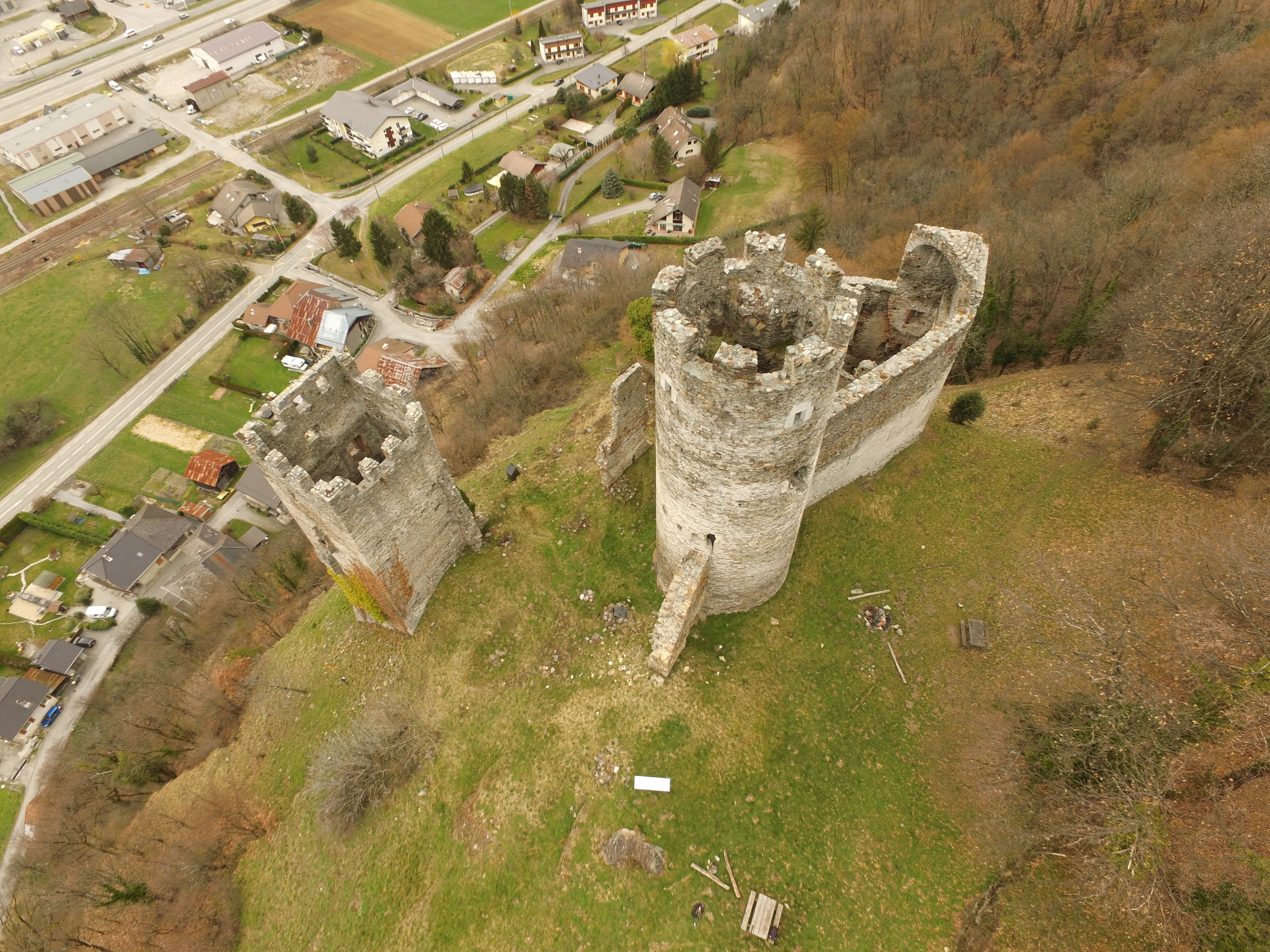
Aerial view

== See also ==
- List of castles in France
