= Guy Chambefort =

French politician

Guy Chambefort (born 19 October 1944 in Saint-Étienne) was a member of the National Assembly of France. He represented the first constituency of the Allier department, from 2007 to 2017 and sat as a member of the Socialist, Radical, Citizen and Miscellaneous Left group in the Assembly.
