= Claude Riboulet =

French politician (born 1975)

President of the Departmental Council of Allier
- Incumbent
- Assumed office 25 September 2017
- Preceded by: Gérard Dériot

Personal details
- Born: 14 April 1975 (age 51)
- Party: Union of Democrats and Independents

Claude Riboulet (born 14 April 1975) is a French politician serving as president of the Departmental Council of Allier since 2017. From 2014 to 2017, he served as mayor of Commentry.
