= Allier =

Department in Auvergne-Rhône-Alpes, France

Allier Alèir (Occitan)
- Department
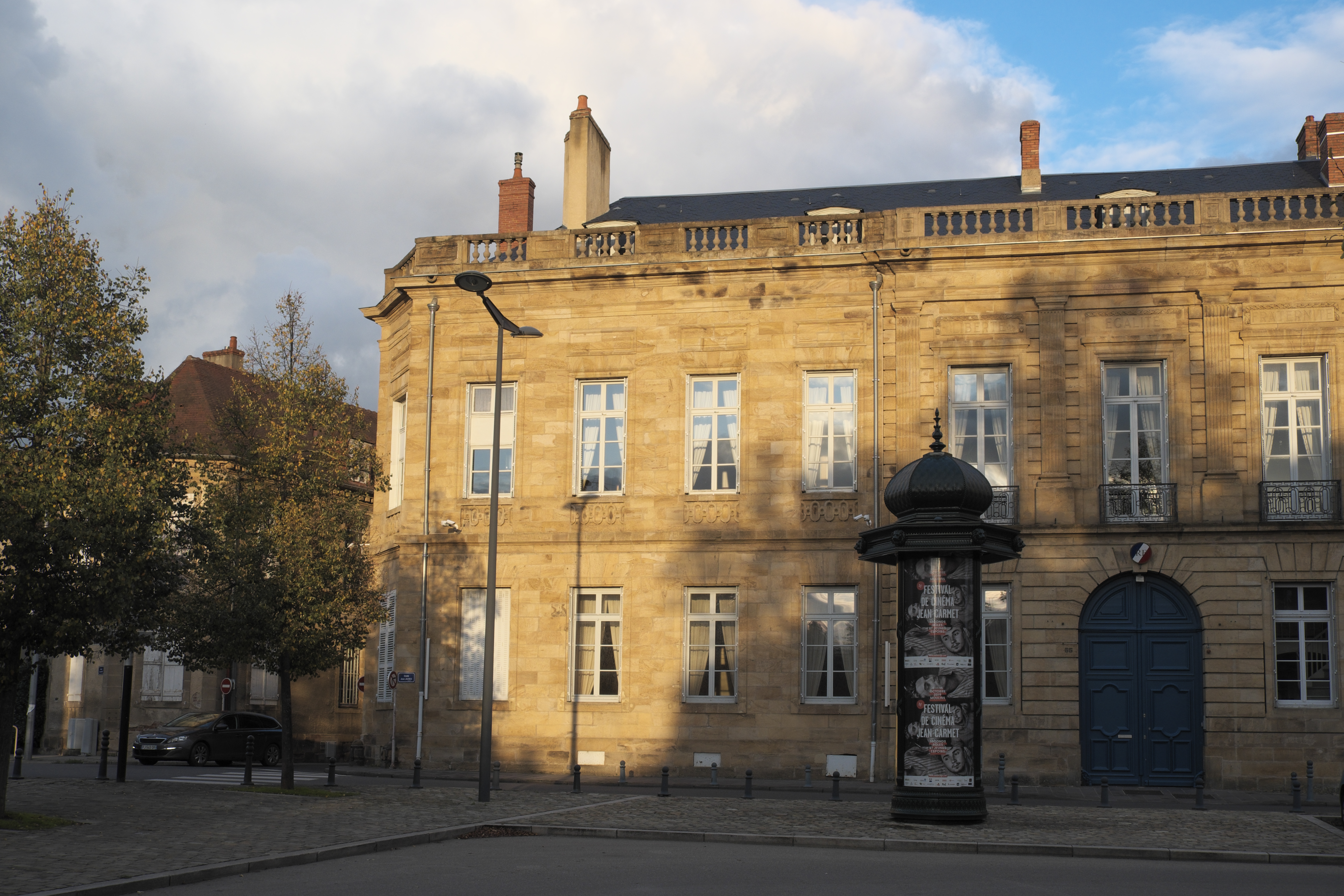
- Prefecture building in Moulins

- Flag Coat of arms

- Location of Allier in France
- Coordinates: 46°20′N 3°10′E
- Country: France
- Region: Auvergne-Rhône-Alpes
- Prefecture: Moulins
- Subprefectures: Montluçon; Vichy

Government
  - President of the Departmental Council: Claude Riboulet (UDI)

Area^{1}
  - Total: 7,340 km^{2} (2,830 sq mi)

Population (2023)
  - Total: 333,298
  - Rank: 69th
  - Density: 45.4/km^{2} (118/sq mi)
- Time zone: UTC+1 (CET)
  - Summer (DST): UTC+2 (CEST)
- Department number: 03
- Arrondissements: 3
- Cantons: 19
- Communes: 317
- ^1 French Land Register data, which excludes estuaries, and lakes, ponds, and glaciers larger than 1 km^{2}

Allier (UK: /ˈælieɪ/ AL-ee-ay, US: /ælˈjeɪ, ɑːlˈjeɪ/ a(h)l-YAY; French: [alje]; Occitan: Alèir) is a department in the Auvergne-Rhône-Alpes region that borders Cher to the west, Nièvre to the north, Saône-et-Loire and Loire to the east, Puy-de-Dôme to the south, and Creuse to the south-west. Named after the river Allier, it had a population of 333,298 in 2023. Moulins is the prefecture; Montluçon and Vichy are the subprefectures. Its INSEE and post code is 03.

Before 2018, the inhabitants of the department did not have a demonym. The inhabitants of the department have officially been known in French as Bourbonnais since 2018, a reference to the historic province of Bourbonnais. Until then, the unofficial term Elavérins had been used.

== Geography ==
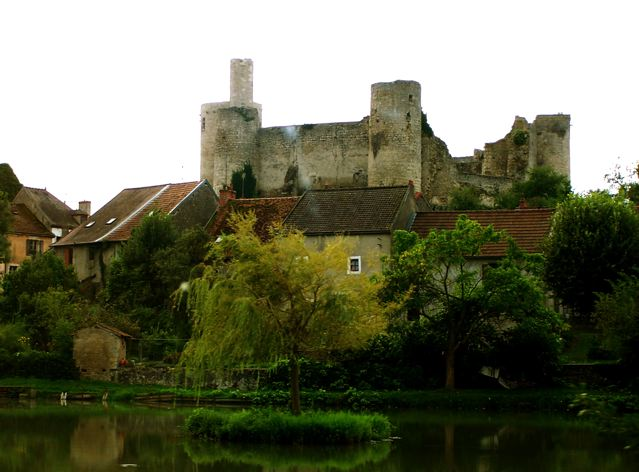
Château de Billy

Allier department is composed of almost all of the former Duchy of Bourbonnais. It is part of the Auvergne-Rhône-Alpes and it was part of the historical, cultural and administrative region of Auvergne until 2016.

=== Principal communes ===
The most populous commune is Montluçon; the prefecture Moulins is the third-most populous. As of 2023, there are 5 communes with more than 10,000 inhabitants:

| Commune | Population (2023) |
|---|---|
| Montluçon | 33,147 |
| Vichy | 25,115 |
| Moulins | 19,206 |
| Cusset | 13,316 |
| Yzeure | 12,897 |

The department includes the spa towns Bourbon-l'Archambault, Néris-les-Bains and Vichy.

=== Relief ===
Bourbonnais bocage covers most of the western and central parts of the department (including the Forest of Tronçais), followed by the Bourbonnais Sologne in the east north-east, the Bourbonnais Mountain (near Vichy) which is the highest point of Bourbonnais together with Montoncel (peaking at 1,287 metres), and finally in the south of the department, the Bourbonnais Limagne, which extends from Varennes to Gannat, and is the breadbasket of the department.

==== The Bourbonnais Bocage ====
To the north and just over 500 metres above sea level, the Bourbonnais Bocage occupies one-third of the department, with two parts: the centre and the west (for the part between the Val de Cher and western boundaries of the territory). The bocage is especially remarkable for its rich forests and woodlands including the Forest of Tronçais but also the forests of Moladier Bagnolet, Civrais, Soulongis, Grosbois, Dreuille, Lespinasse and Suave.

Almost all of the southern area consists of Combrailles which is sometimes called High Bourbonnais, in an area that goes beyond the departmental boundaries of Creuse and Puy-de-Dôme. This area of the department rises to 778 metres at Bosse. The rivers Sioule, Bouble, and Cher have carved the most picturesque gorges in Allier.

==== The Bourbonnais Sologne ====
To the east, between the Val d'Allier and the borders of Nièvre and Saône-et-Loire, the Bourbonnais Sologne balances ecosystems of pastures, crops, woods and ponds. The interface between agriculture and semi-wilderness benefits biodiversity in fauna and flora.

==== The Bourbonnais Mountains ====
In its southern extension, the Bourbonnais Mountain rises from the Puy Saint-Ambroise (442 metres) near Saint-Léon and then extends to the massif of Assise and the Black Woods at the edge of Puy-de-Dôme and Loire which is marked by the Puy de Montoncel (1,287 metres) – the highest point in Allier.

==== The Bourbonnais Limagne ====
Commonly grouped under the name of Val d'Allier, the Limagne and Forterre extend on both sides of the river between Vichy and Saint-Pourçain-sur-Sioule with an essential quality of fertility. Limogne, together with Sioule and Allier, is part of the Gannat / Escurolles / Saint-Pourçain triangle while Forterre covers the Canton of Varennes-sur-Allier ending near Jaligny.

=== Hydrography ===
==== Watercourses ====
- to the west: the Cher
- in the centre: the Allier and its tributary the Sioule
- to the east the Loire and its tributary the Besbre

=== Climate ===
A transition zone in the middle of the country, Allier is actually a free zone between north and south. Atlantic weather influences cause a mild and humid climate dominated by westerly winds, which sets it apart from other parts of Auvergne. The weather variances coincide with the diversity of Bourbonnais territory such as: flat regions, low altitude Bourbonnais Sologne and large floodplains, the hill country, the average altitude of 300 to 600 metres, the central part of the department, and the semi-mountainous southern townships bordering the Combraille and Forez between 700 and 1,200 metres.

There are two periods of maximum precipitation in June and October and a minimum in January and February with average of 694 millimetres in Montluçon (altitude 207 metres), 763 mm in Moulins (245 m), 778 mm in Vichy (251 m), 791 mm in Lapalisse (285 m) and nearly 1,200 mm in Assisi (1,050 m). As noted Atlantic winds are dominant from the west, northwest, or southwest. The influence of topography, especially in the valleys of Cher and Allier, also contributes to the south and north variance.

Comparison of local Meteorological data with other cities in France
| Town | Sunshine (hours/yr) | Rain (mm/yr) | Snow (days/yr) | Storm (days/yr) | Fog (days/yr) |
|---|---|---|---|---|---|
| National average | 1,973 | 770 | 14 | 22 | 40 |
| Vichy | 1,862 | 780 | 18 | 26 | 35 |
| Paris | 1,661 | 637 | 12 | 18 | 10 |
| Nice | 2,724 | 767 | 1 | 29 | 1 |
| Strasbourg | 1,693 | 665 | 29 | 29 | 56 |
| Brest | 1,605 | 1,211 | 7 | 12 | 75 |

Climate data for Vichy
| Month | Jan | Feb | Mar | Apr | May | Jun | Jul | Aug | Sep | Oct | Nov | Dec | Year |
|---|---|---|---|---|---|---|---|---|---|---|---|---|---|
| Mean daily maximum °C (°F) | 7.4 (45.3) | 9.0 (48.2) | 13.0 (55.4) | 15.8 (60.4) | 20.0 (68.0) | 23.5 (74.3) | 26.4 (79.5) | 26.1 (79.0) | 22.2 (72.0) | 17.6 (63.7) | 11.2 (52.2) | 7.8 (46.0) | 16.7 (62.1) |
| Daily mean °C (°F) | 3.5 (38.3) | 4.4 (39.9) | 7.5 (45.5) | 9.9 (49.8) | 14.1 (57.4) | 17.4 (63.3) | 19.9 (67.8) | 19.5 (67.1) | 16.0 (60.8) | 12.5 (54.5) | 7.0 (44.6) | 4.1 (39.4) | 11.3 (52.3) |
| Mean daily minimum °C (°F) | −0.4 (31.3) | −0.2 (31.6) | 1.9 (35.4) | 3.9 (39.0) | 8.1 (46.6) | 11.2 (52.2) | 13.3 (55.9) | 12.9 (55.2) | 9.8 (49.6) | 7.3 (45.1) | 2.8 (37.0) | 0.4 (32.7) | 5.9 (42.6) |
| Average precipitation mm (inches) | 46.8 (1.84) | 39.8 (1.57) | 44.2 (1.74) | 69.3 (2.73) | 98.2 (3.87) | 78.2 (3.08) | 71.6 (2.82) | 74.2 (2.92) | 75.4 (2.97) | 68.0 (2.68) | 63.3 (2.49) | 50.5 (1.99) | 779.5 (30.69) |
| Average precipitation days (≥ 1 mm) | 9.8 | 8.3 | 8.4 | 9.8 | 11.6 | 8.7 | 7.6 | 8.6 | 8.3 | 9.6 | 10.0 | 9.0 | 109.7 |
| Mean monthly sunshine hours | 78 | 95 | 154 | 175 | 203 | 225 | 249 | 238 | 184 | 128 | 77 | 56 | 1,862 |
Source: Meteorological data for Vichy – 249 m altitude, from 1981 to 2010 January 2015 (in French)

== History ==
Allier in 1790

The history of Allier corresponds to the Duchy of Bourbon (Bourbonnais) with which it shares almost the entire territory.

Allier is one of the original 83 departments created during the French Revolution on 4 March 1790. It was created from parts of the former provinces of Auvergne and Bourbonnais.

In 1940, the government of Marshal Philippe Pétain chose the town of Vichy as its capital. Vichy also became the department's second sub-prefecture in 1940, since the department now found itself split by the demarcation line between the occupied and (relatively, at least initially) free zones of France.

=== Heraldry ===
| Arms of Allier | The arms of Allier are also those of the former province of Bourbonnais and are the arms of the third house of Bourbon of Robert de Clermont, sixth son of Saint Louis, who married Beatrice of Bourbon and was recognized as Sire of Bourbon in 1283. Blazon: Azure, Semé-de-lis of Or with a bend of Gules. |

== Demography ==
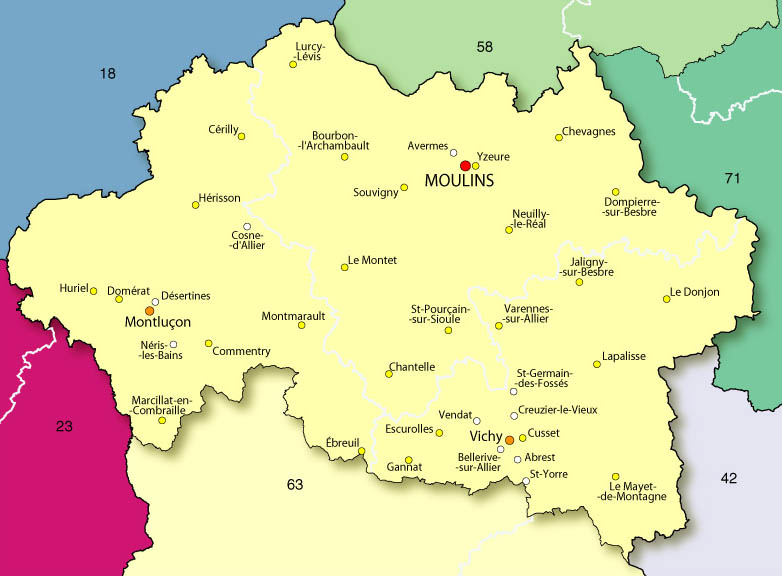
Map of Allier

On 1 January 2023 the population of Allier was estimated at 333,298 inhabitants which represented an average density of 45 people/km^{2}. Many areas have a density less than 20 people/km^{2}. Because of its low population density, it is considered to fall within the empty diagonal.

Since the early 1980s Allier has faced many demographic handicaps. With the population ratio skewing older and the low fertility rate, the natural growth in the region is negative. Net migration was negative between 1968 and 1999, and slightly positive between 1999 and 2023.

Allier has three major cities: Montluçon, Vichy, and Moulins by size. The rest of the department includes scattered small towns and villages along the rivers. Until the end of the 19th century, however, the population was increasing because the development of its cities (industries at Montluçon and Moulins, spas in Vichy) compensated the rural exodus. The department then passed 420,000 inhabitants. After losses of the First World War, the population stabilized and grew slightly in the 1960s. Since then, the continuing rural exodus and the decline of old industries has made the population decrease and age steadily, from 386,533 inhabitants in 1968 to 333,298 in 2023.

The population of the department is approximately equal of the country of Iceland.

Historical population

| Year | Pop. | ±% p.a. |
|---|---|---|
| 1791 | 267,126 | — |
| 1801 | 248,864 | −0.71% |
| 1806 | 260,046 | +0.88% |
| 1821 | 280,025 | +0.49% |
| 1831 | 298,257 | +0.63% |
| 1836 | 309,270 | +0.73% |
| 1841 | 311,361 | +0.13% |
| 1846 | 329,540 | +1.14% |
| 1851 | 336,758 | +0.43% |
| 1856 | 352,241 | +0.90% |
| 1861 | 356,432 | +0.24% |
| 1866 | 376,164 | +1.08% |
| 1872 | 390,812 | +0.64% |
| 1876 | 405,783 | +0.94% |
| 1881 | 416,759 | +0.54% |
| 1886 | 424,582 | +0.37% |
| 1891 | 424,382 | −0.01% |
| 1896 | 424,378 | −0.00% |
| 1901 | 422,024 | −0.11% |

| Year | Pop. | ±% p.a. |
|---|---|---|
| 1906 | 417,961 | −0.19% |
| 1911 | 406,291 | −0.56% |
| 1921 | 370,950 | −0.91% |
| 1926 | 370,562 | −0.02% |
| 1931 | 373,924 | +0.18% |
| 1936 | 368,778 | −0.28% |
| 1946 | 373,481 | +0.13% |
| 1954 | 372,689 | −0.03% |
| 1962 | 380,221 | +0.25% |
| 1968 | 386,533 | +0.27% |
| 1975 | 378,406 | −0.30% |
| 1982 | 369,580 | −0.34% |
| 1990 | 357,710 | −0.41% |
| 1999 | 344,615 | −0.41% |
| 2007 | 343,114 | −0.05% |
| 2012 | 342,911 | −0.01% |
| 2017 | 337,988 | −0.29% |
| 2023 | 333,298 | −0.23% |

Source: SPLAF and INSEE

== Politics and administration ==
=== Prefecture ===
Valérie Hatsch is prefect of Allier since 28 March 2022.

Jean-Luc Marx, the prefect of Lot, was named the prefect of Allier on 1 June 2011, replacing Pierre Monzani who was appointed Prefect of Seine-et-Marne on 25 May 2011.

=== Two senators ===
After 2020 Senate elections, the two senators of Allier are Bruno Rojouan and Claude Malhuret.

In the Senate elections in 2008 the left took one of the two Senate seats in Allier formerly held by the right. Mireille Schurch, PCF Mayor of Lignerolles, was elected:

- Gérard Dériot DVD
- Mireille Schurch PCF

=== Representatives in the National Assembly ===
The current representatives are:

| Constituency | Member | Party |
|---|---|---|
| Allier's 1st constituency | Yannick Monnet | French Communist Party |
| Allier's 2nd constituency | Jorys Bovet | National Rally |
| Allier's 3rd constituency | Nicolas Ray | The Republicans |

=== Departmental Council ===
The current president of the Departmental Council is Claude Riboulet, elected in 2017. In the 2021 departmental election, the Departmental Council of Allier was elected as follows:

| Party | Seats |
|---|---|
| Miscellaneous right | 20 |
| Socialist Party | 6 |
| Centre-right | 4 |
| French Communist Party | 2 |
| Right | 2 |
| The Republicans | 2 |
| Left Radical Party | 2 |

In the local elections of March 2008, Allier department was won by a majority of the left. The URB (Republican Union for Bourbonnais, right) had headed the department between 2001 and 2008, with the last year with only one vote majority. From 2008 the left coalition was in control also with a majority of one vote (10 PC, 6 PS, 2 PRG, 18 seats in total), facing 17 councilors from the URB.

=== History of the left in Allier ===
The department was distinguished by communist votes in early voting which continued until after the Second World War with the two major political parties of the left being the PCF and the SFIO which have now become the Socialist Party.

The small town of Commentry has the distinction of being the first town in France to elect a socialist mayor in 1882: Christophe Thivrier. Another local figure, Pierre Brizon, an MP in 1910, was typically a member for sharecroppers.

Earlier, Ledru-Rollin achieved a very good result in 1848 (14%) with Democratic and socialist candidates in the following year (44% of the vote, against 35% for all of France). Similarly, resistance to the coup of 2 December 1851 was important after an attempt to support the uprising in June 1849. Republicans were in the majority in 1876 and held all six parliamentary seats. After neighbouring results of 15% of enrolled voters from 1893 to 1906 the Socialists rose to 31% of enrolled votes (42% of those cast) in 1910 and maintained this in 1914

Allier remains a land of rural communism (still 14.66% in the 2004 regional elections – the second best result for the party after Somme) in a sometimes difficult cohabitation with the Socialist Party.

For the causes of their success it may be noted that historically Allier has been a department where vast properties were combined into sharecropping. Sharecropping only spread in the 15th century and was not disturbed by the sale of national assets to the Revolution. In the 19th century large properties (100 hectares or more) occupied about half of the land, and even more than 70% in the north of the department. In the south, small properties dominate.

Sharecropping continued as a form of land development and it involved 40% of the land in 1892 (only 7% overall for France). Adverse conditions made sharecroppers promote the creation of rural unions between 1904 and 1911 (the third greatest number per department in France after Hérault and Landes). Despite poor results the mobilization was important and promoted the election of left-wing candidates.

- List of senators of Allier
- Communes of the Allier department

== Economy ==
The industries most represented are the food industry, wood and furniture, chemical, foundries and metalworking, rubber, machinery and electrical equipment, automotive, weaponry, textiles, building, and the spas.

According to studies by INSEE agriculture would be about 7 to 8% of departmental gross domestic product.

== Transport ==
The department is served by two airports, Montluçon–Guéret Airport and Vichy — Charmeil Airport. However, both airports are not operating any passengers flights. The nearest airports to Allier are Clermont-Ferrand Auvergne Airport and Lyon–Saint-Exupéry Airport, which both are used by air travellers from the department.

== Tourism ==
Marked by the imprint of the Dukes of Bourbon, Allier is a land of rivers, bocage, and small mountains. Landscapes such as Bourbonnais bocage, the gorges of the Sioule, and the Forest of Tronçais are places suitable for the practice of outdoor activities: hiking, fishing, and white water sports. Hydrotherapy is one of the leading sectors of Bourbonnais tourism with the international spa at Vichy.

This nature preserve also features over 500 castles, Romanesque churches and a number of houses which represent the heritage of the Bourbons.

Popular tourist destinations include:

=== Monuments ===
- the Château de La Palice and its Renaissance chambered ceilings,
- the Bourbon-l'Archambault Castle, "Cradle of the Bourbons"

=== Churches and abbeys ===
- Moulins Cathedral and the triptych of the Virgin in glory
- the Priory Church of Saint Peter at Souvigny, more commonly called the "Saint-Denis" of the Bourbons
- the Abbey of Saint Vincent de Chantelle
- Saint-Saturnin Church of Cusset, designated a monument historique

=== Museums ===
- The National Centre of Stage Costume
- Maison Mantin in Moulins

=== Activities ===
- Le Pal, an amusement and animal park in Dompierre-sur-Besbre
- Paleopolis in Gannat, a site designed to understand life sciences and the earth through paleontology
- Three cities stand out:
- Moulins for its historical heritage from the 15th century
- Montluçon, a medieval and festive city dominated by its castle
- Vichy, an important spa town.
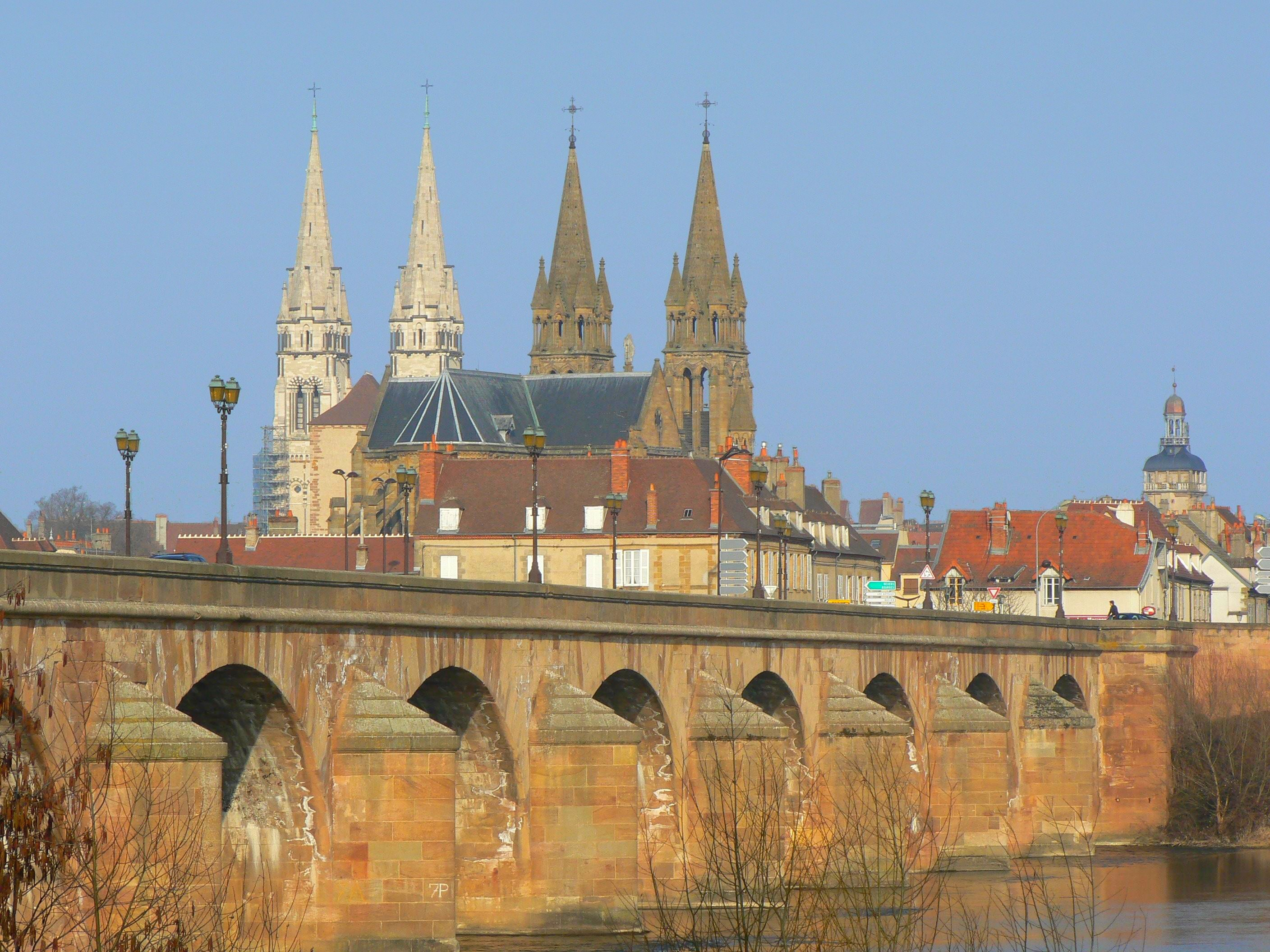
Moulins

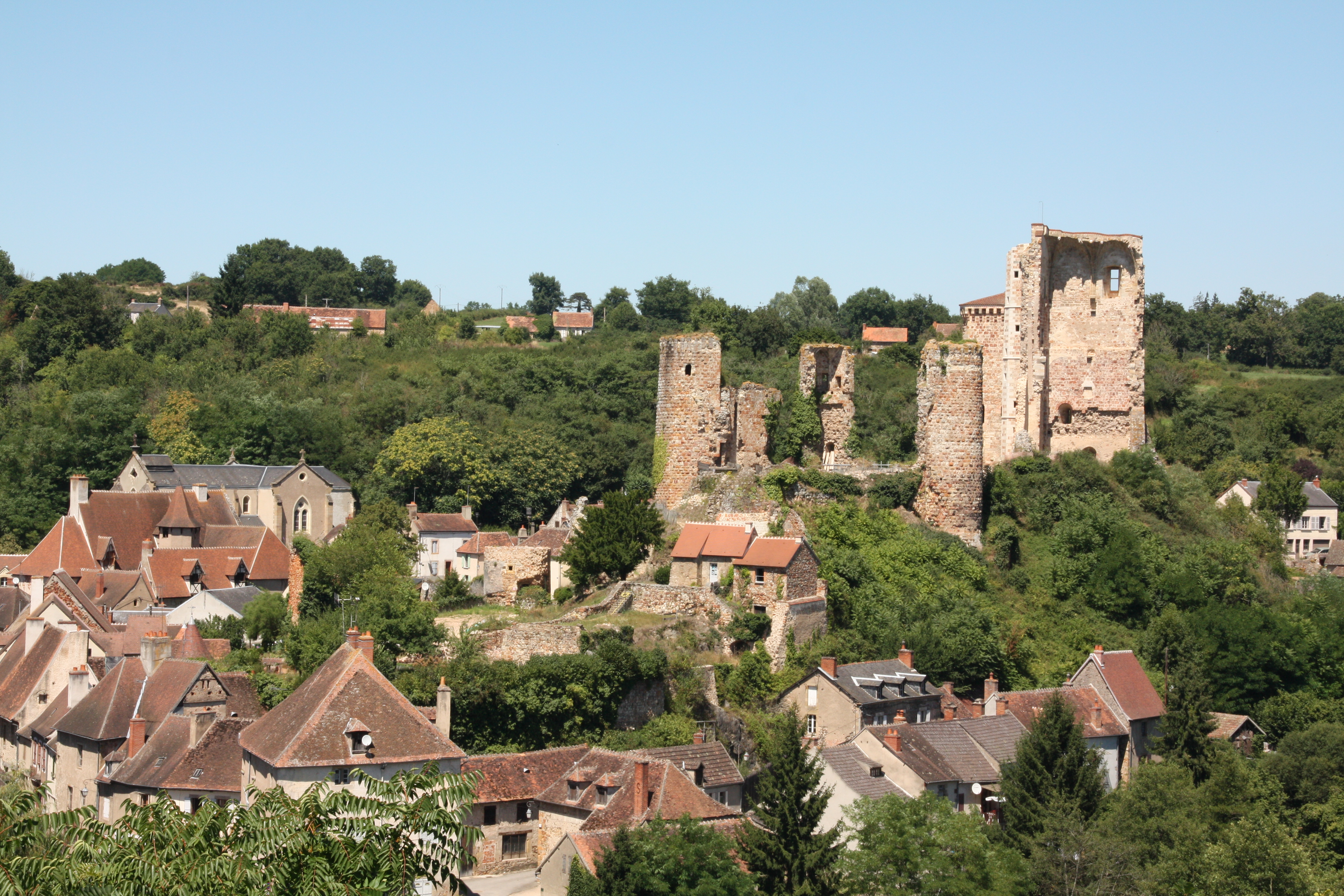
Hérisson

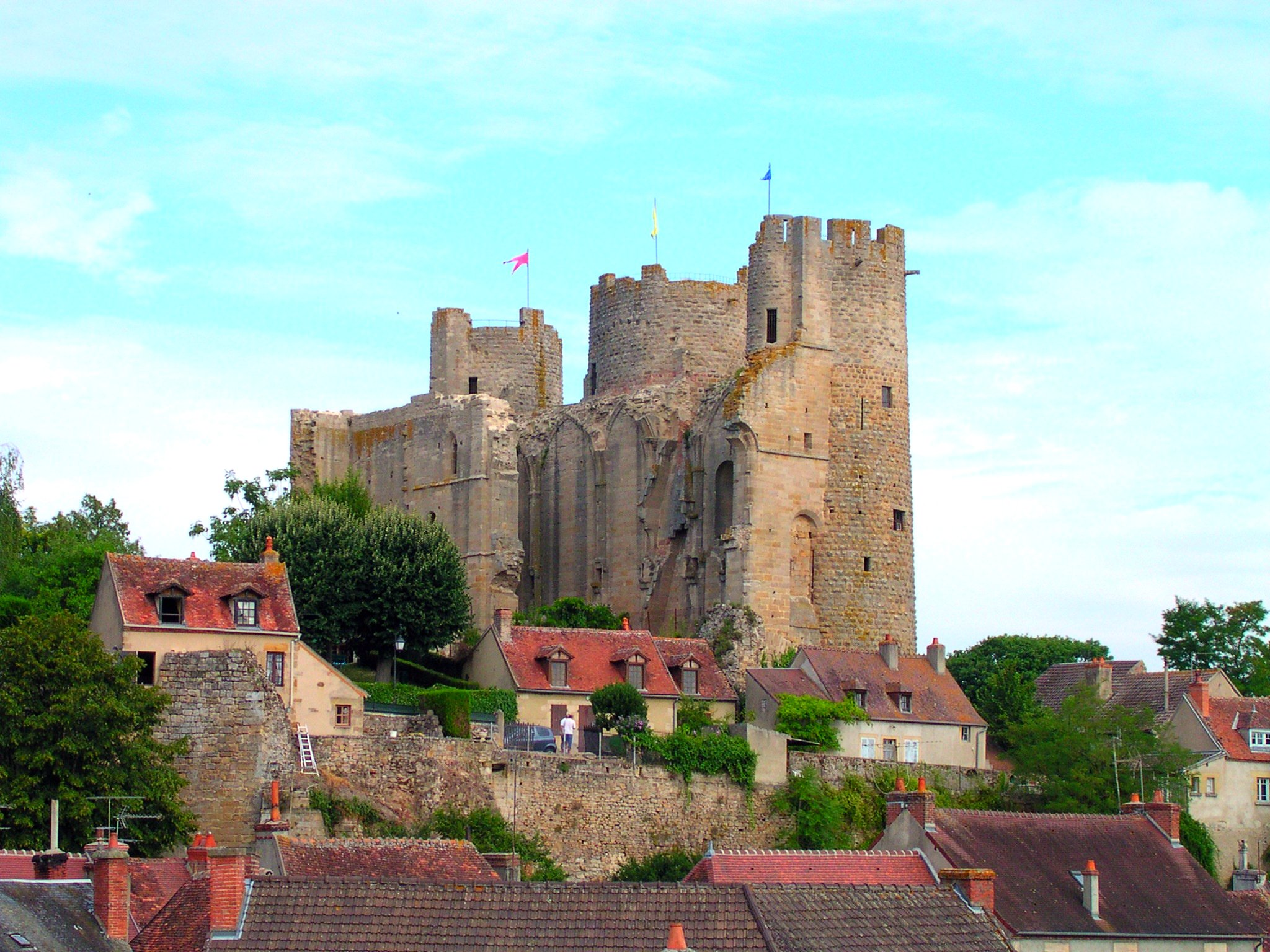
Bourbon-l'Archambault

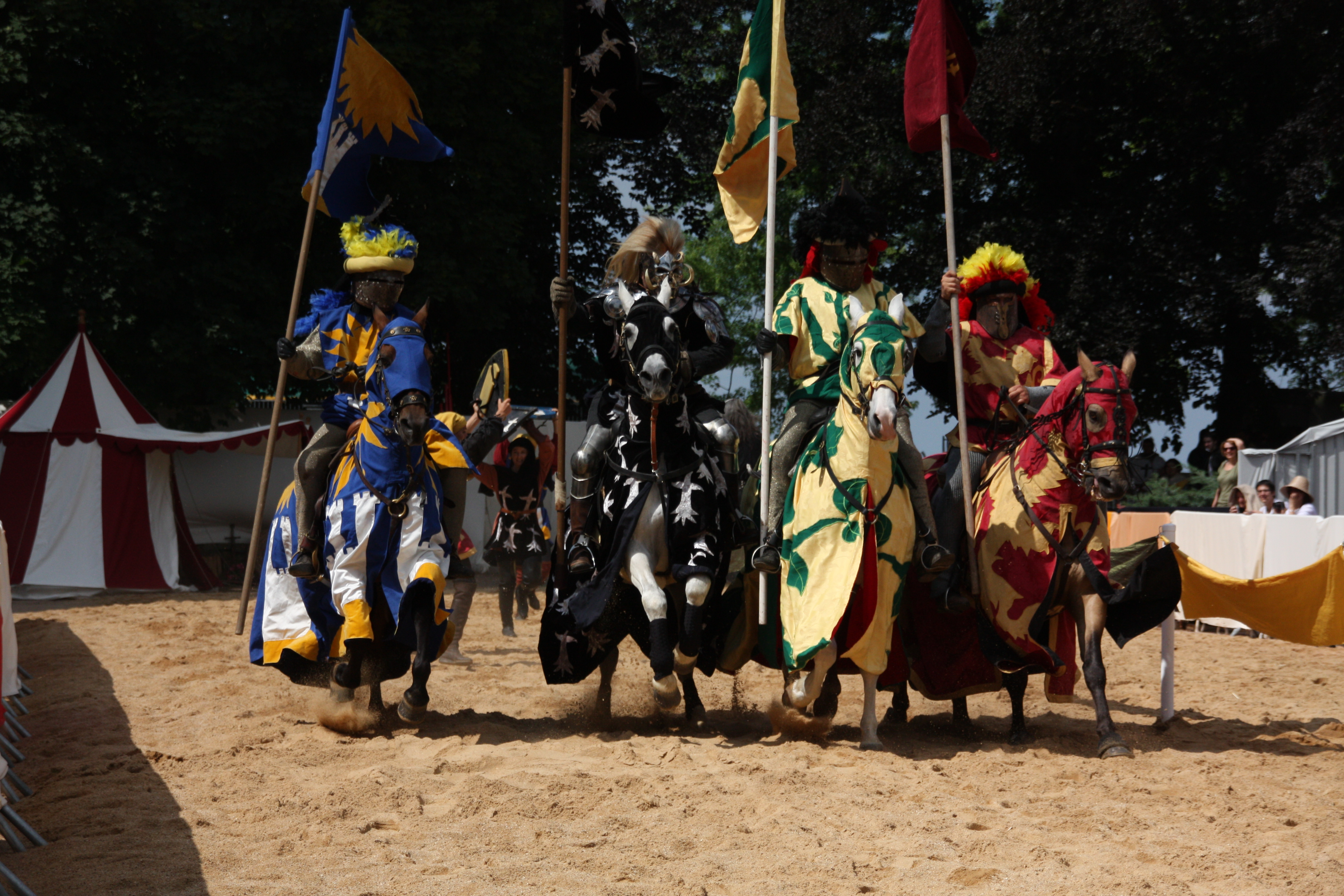
Medieval fair in Montluçon

== Gastronomy and viticulture ==
Bourbon cuisine reflects the history of the province and provides a number of local products. The pâté aux pommes de terre is one of the specialities of the Allier, as well as of the neighboring Limousin region. The river Allier is one of the rare places in Southern Europe where the freshwater grayling (Thymallus thymallus), known in French as ombre des rivières, occurs in a natural habitat. This fish is much valued in French gastronomy for its fine and delicate texture and is best eaten along with a light wine. Pompe aux grattons or brioche aux griaudes, a kind of brioche-like bread with cracklings, is a specialty of the Bourbonnais. Saint-Pourçain AOC wine is produced in Allier and the oak from the forest of Tronçais is one of the most favoured in the construction of wine barrels. Other local specialties include Charroux mustard, and Vichy pastilles candies.

=== Second homes ===
In 2020 the quantity of dwellings in the department which were second homes was 7.2%. The table below shows the main communes of Allier with second homes and which exceed 10% of total housing.

The department has attracted many foreigners, English, Belgian, Swiss, and Dutch, and they have acquired many second homes. Therefore many communes have become "European", such as Pouzy-Mésangy, which today has many English and Swiss residents.

Communes with population over 1,000 and more than 10% of second homes in 2019
| Town | Municipal population | Percentage of secondary homes |
|---|---|---|
| Néris-les-Bains | 2,570 | 30.3% |
| Cérilly | 1,305 | 16.4% |
| Ébreuil | 1,270 | 14.5% |
| Bourbon-l'Archambault | 2,572 | 13.5% |
| Buxières-les-Mines | 1,026 | 13.5% |
| Le Mayet-de-Montagne | 1,384 | 10.0% |

== Culture ==
=== Sister regions ===
The Conseil Départemental of Allier co-operates with the following foreign administrative units:

- Niafunké (Mali) since 1988.
- Khemisset (Morocco) since 2009.
- Övörkhangai (Mongolia) since 2000.
- Cluj (Romania) since 2002.
- M'bour Department (Senegal) since 2016.
- Nguékhokh (Senegal) since 2002.

=== Regional languages ===
Allier is traversed by the border between Occitan and French.

For a long period the people of Allier did not speak standard French but one of the following local languages:

- Bourbonnais: Dialect oïl, north of a line from Montluçon to Saint-Pourçain-sur-Sioule to Lapalisse
- Auvergnat: (a dialect of Occitan) in the extreme south
- the area between the two, sometimes called Bourbon d'oc is part of the Occitan Crescent, an area of mixing of French and Occitan considered by most linguists as Occitan with French pronunciation. Some consider the speech of the Crescent to be a full Occitan dialect and use the term Marchois.

Qualifications:

- Note that in the south-east of the department (notably in Forterre and the Bourbonnais Mountain) the influence of Francoprovencal arises.
- Similarly, in the north-west (and especially in the old part of the Bourbonnais department of Cher to Saint-Amand-Montrond), the Bourbon dialects are close to the Berrichon dialect.

== See also ==
- Arrondissements of the Allier department
- Cantons of the Allier department
- Communes of the Allier department
- List of intercommunalities of the Allier department
