= Jean Cluzel =

French politician (1923–2020)

Jean Cluzel (18 November 1923 – 12 September 2020) was a French politician who was renowned in the 1980s for his reports about the audiovisual media. He was born in Moulins, Allier, France in November 1923. Cluzel served as a senator, and was a member of the Académie des sciences morales et politiques.
