= Canton of Montluçon-Sud =

Coordinates: 46°20′27″N 2°36′12″E

Montluçon-Sud
- Former canton
- Interactive map of Montluçon-Sud
- Country: France
- Region: Auvergne-Rhône-Alpes
- Department: Allier
- No. of communes: {{{nbcomm}}}
- Disbanded: 2015
- Population (2012): 15,789

The canton of Montluçon-Sud is a former administrative division in central France. It was disbanded following the French canton reorganisation which came into effect in March 2015. It had 15,789 inhabitants (2012).

The canton comprised the following communes:

- Lavault-Sainte-Anne
- Lignerolles
- Montluçon (partly)
- Néris-les-Bains
- Teillet-Argenty

== Demographics ==
Historical population
Year	Pop.	±%
1990	16,828	—
1999	16,359	−2.8%
2012	15,789	−3.5%

== See also ==
- Cantons of the Allier department
- Communes of France
