= Canton of Montluçon-Ouest =

Coordinates: 46°20′27″N 2°36′12″E

Montluçon-Ouest (2nd Canton)
- Former canton
- Interactive map of Montluçon-Ouest (2nd Canton)
- Country: France
- Region: Auvergne-Rhône-Alpes
- Department: Allier
- No. of communes: {{{nbcomm}}}
- Disbanded: 2015
- Population (2012): 13,736

The canton of Montluçon-Ouest is a former administrative division in central France. It was disbanded following the French canton reorganisation which came into effect in March 2015. It had 13,736 inhabitants (2012).

The canton comprised the following communes:

- Lamaids
- Montluçon (partly)
- Prémilhat
- Quinssaines

== Demographics ==
Historical population
| Year | Pop. | ±% |
|---|---|---|
| 1990 | 14,447 | — |
| 1999 | 13,172 | −8.8% |
| 2012 | 13,736 | +4.3% |

== See also ==
- Cantons of the Allier department
