= Quinssaines =

- Commune
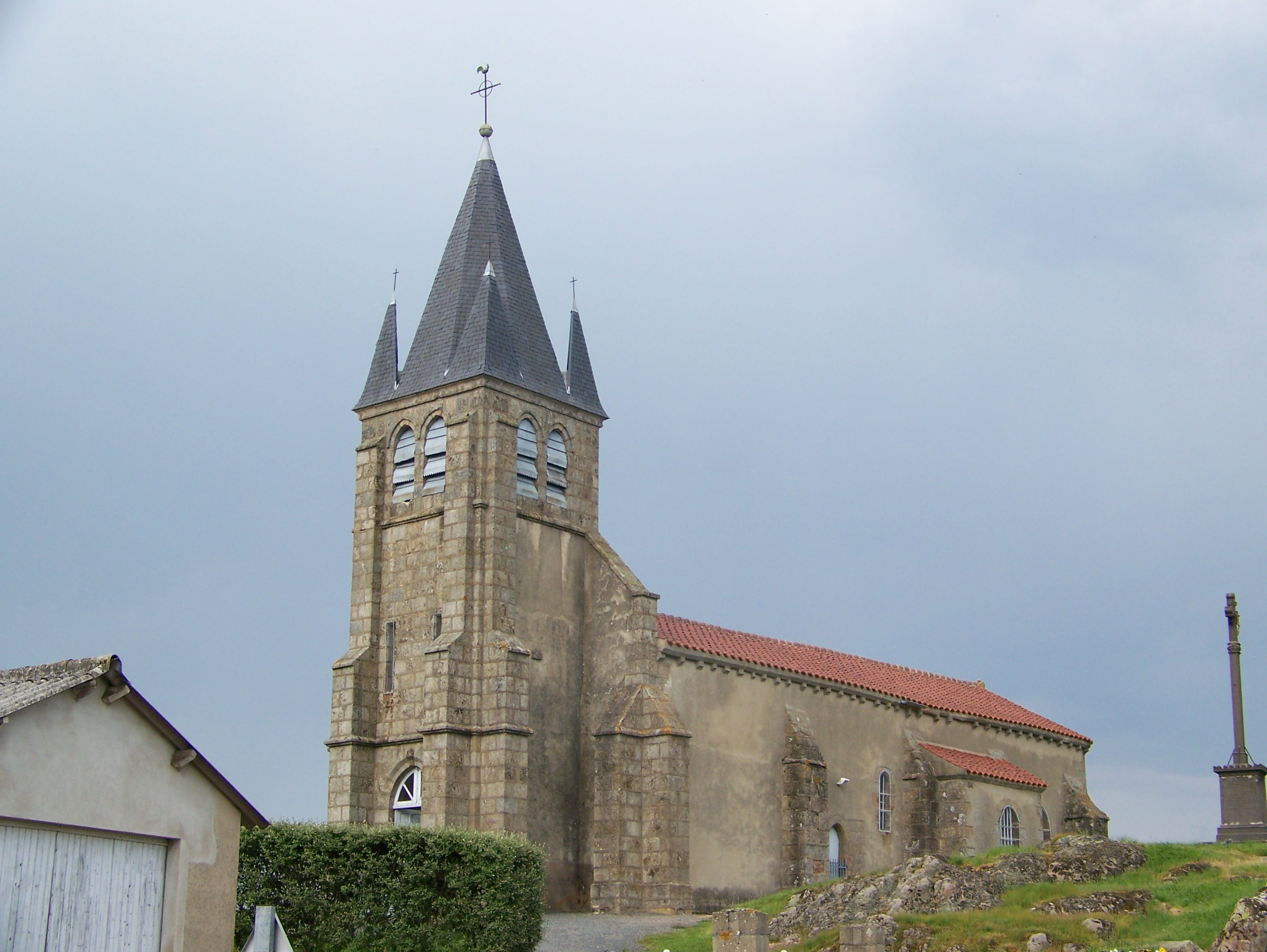
- The church in Quinssaines
- Location of Quinssaines
- Location within France Location within Auvergne-Rhône-Alpes
- Coordinates: 46°19′41″N 2°30′40″E
- Country: France
- Region: Auvergne-Rhône-Alpes
- Department: Allier
- Arrondissement: Montluçon
- Canton: Montluçon-4
- Intercommunality: CA Montluçon Communauté

Government
  - Mayor (2026–32): Francis Nouhant
- Area^{1}: 25.37 km^{2} (9.80 sq mi)
- Elevation: 420 m (1,380 ft)
- Highest elevation: 483 m (1,585 ft)
- Lowest elevation: 295 m (968 ft)
- Population (2023): 1,528
  - Density: 60.23/km^{2} (156.0/sq mi)
- Time zone: UTC+01:00 (CET)
  - Summer (DST): UTC+02:00 (CEST)
- INSEE/Postal code: 03212 /03380
- ^{1} French Land Register data, which excludes lakes, ponds, glaciers > 1 km^{2} (0.386 sq mi or 247 acres) and river estuaries.

Quinssaines (French pronunciation: [kɛ̃sɛn]; Occitan: Quinçaines) is a commune in the Allier department in Auvergne-Rhône-Alpes in central France.

== Location ==
Located in the west part of Allier department, Quinssaines is also close to the Creuse department.

Adjacent Communes: Huriel, Domérat, Prémilhat, Teillet-Argenty, Viersat, Lamaids, Saint-Martinien

== Population ==
Historical population
Year	Pop.	±% p.a.
1968	715	—
1975	770	+1.06%
1982	1,050	+4.53%
1990	1,071	+0.25%
1999	1,063	−0.08%
2007	1,152	+1.01%
2012	1,408	+4.10%
2017	1,487	+1.10%
2023	1,528	+0.45%
Source: INSEE

== See also ==
- Communes of the Allier department
