= Arpheuilles-Saint-Priest =

- Commune
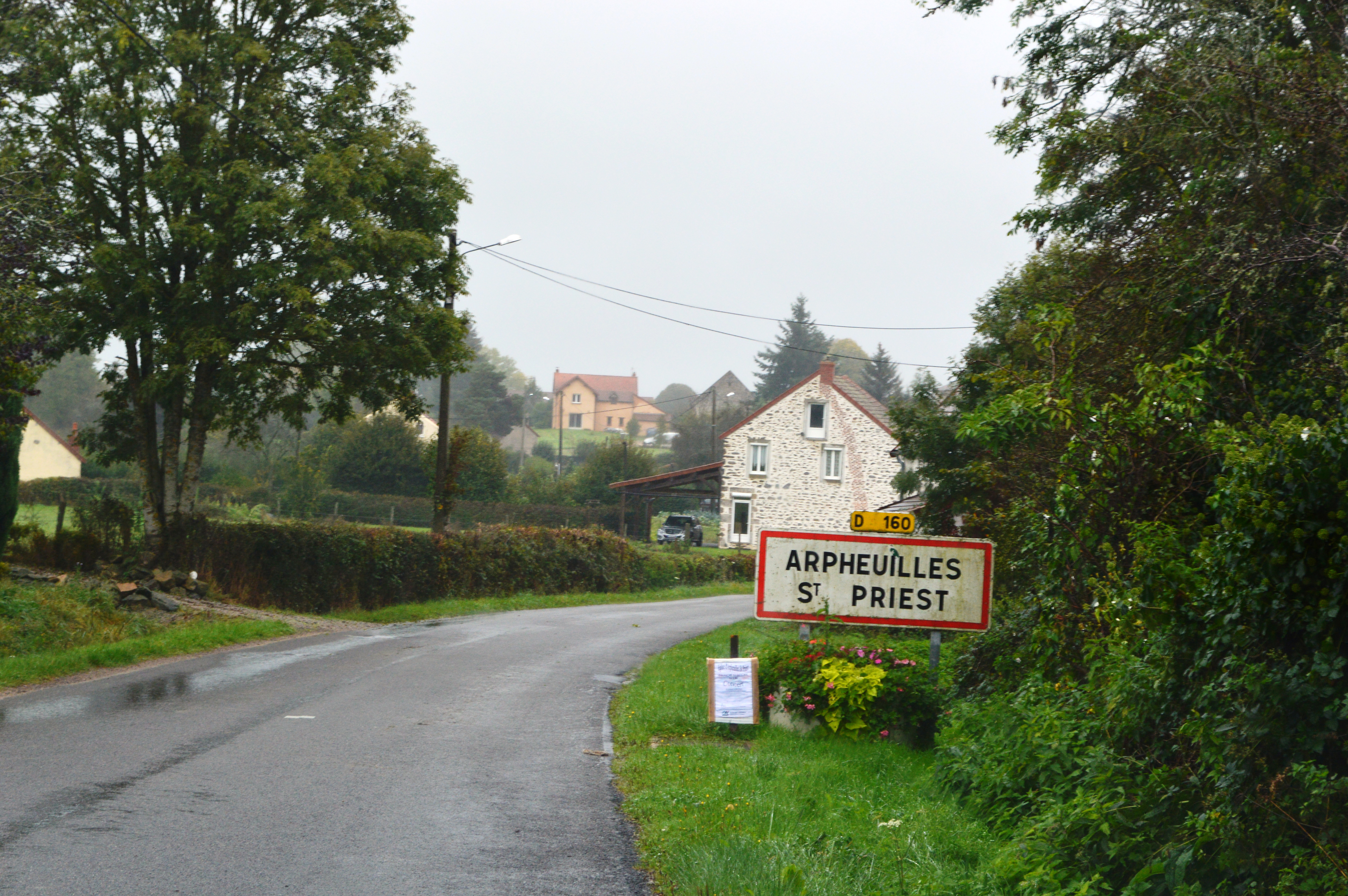
- The road into Arpheuilles-Saint-Priest

- Coat of arms
- Location of Arpheuilles-Saint-Priest
- Location within France Location within Auvergne-Rhône-Alpes
- Coordinates: 46°13′32″N 2°40′43″E
- Country: France
- Region: Auvergne-Rhône-Alpes
- Department: Allier
- Arrondissement: Montluçon
- Canton: Montluçon-3
- Intercommunality: CA Montluçon Communauté

Government
  - Mayor (2026–32): Jean-Paul Lamoine
- Area^{1}: 20.02 km^{2} (7.73 sq mi)
- Elevation: 340 m (1,120 ft)
- Highest elevation: 543 m (1,781 ft)
- Lowest elevation: 393 m (1,289 ft)
- Population (2023): 383
  - Density: 19.1/km^{2} (49.5/sq mi)
- Time zone: UTC+01:00 (CET)
  - Summer (DST): UTC+02:00 (CEST)
- INSEE/Postal code: 03007 /03420
- ^{1} French Land Register data, which excludes lakes, ponds, glaciers > 1 km^{2} (0.386 sq mi or 247 acres) and river estuaries.

Arpheuilles-Saint-Priest (French pronunciation: [aʁfœj sɛ̃ pʁijɛ(st)]; Occitan: Arfuelha e Sant Prich) is a commune in the Allier department in the Auvergne-Rhône-Alpes region of central France.

The inhabitants of the commune are known as Arpheuillais or Arpheuillaises in French.

== Geography ==
Arpheuilles-Saint-Priest is located some 14 kilometres (8.7 mi) south-east of Montluçon and some 8 kilometres (5.0 mi) south-west of Commentry. Access to the commune is by the D69 road from Durdat-Larequille in the north-east passing through the village and continuing south-east to Ronnet. The D1089 branches off the D69 just north-west of the village and continues south-west to Marcillat-en-Combraille. The D460 from Ronnet going north to join the D2144 passes through the east of the commune. Apart from the village there are the hamlets of Villenette, La Naute, and L'Harpe. Apart from a large belt of forest in the north, the commune is entirely farmland.

The Banny river rises in the commune near the village and flows north-east to the Etang de la Ganne. The Ruisseau de Puy Clevaud rises near Villenette and flows south to join the Tartasse south of the commune.

== History ==
=== Heraldry ===
Arms of Arpheuilles-Saint-Priest	Blazon: Party per pale, first Or, an oak leaf in Vert; second Gules, a harp in Argent; all surmounted in chief Azure charged with a key Or in fesse.

Via northern Occitan dialect, the town's toponymy comes from the Latin root Acrifoliu-, plus Saint Praejectus, a 7th century AD bishop.

== Administration ==
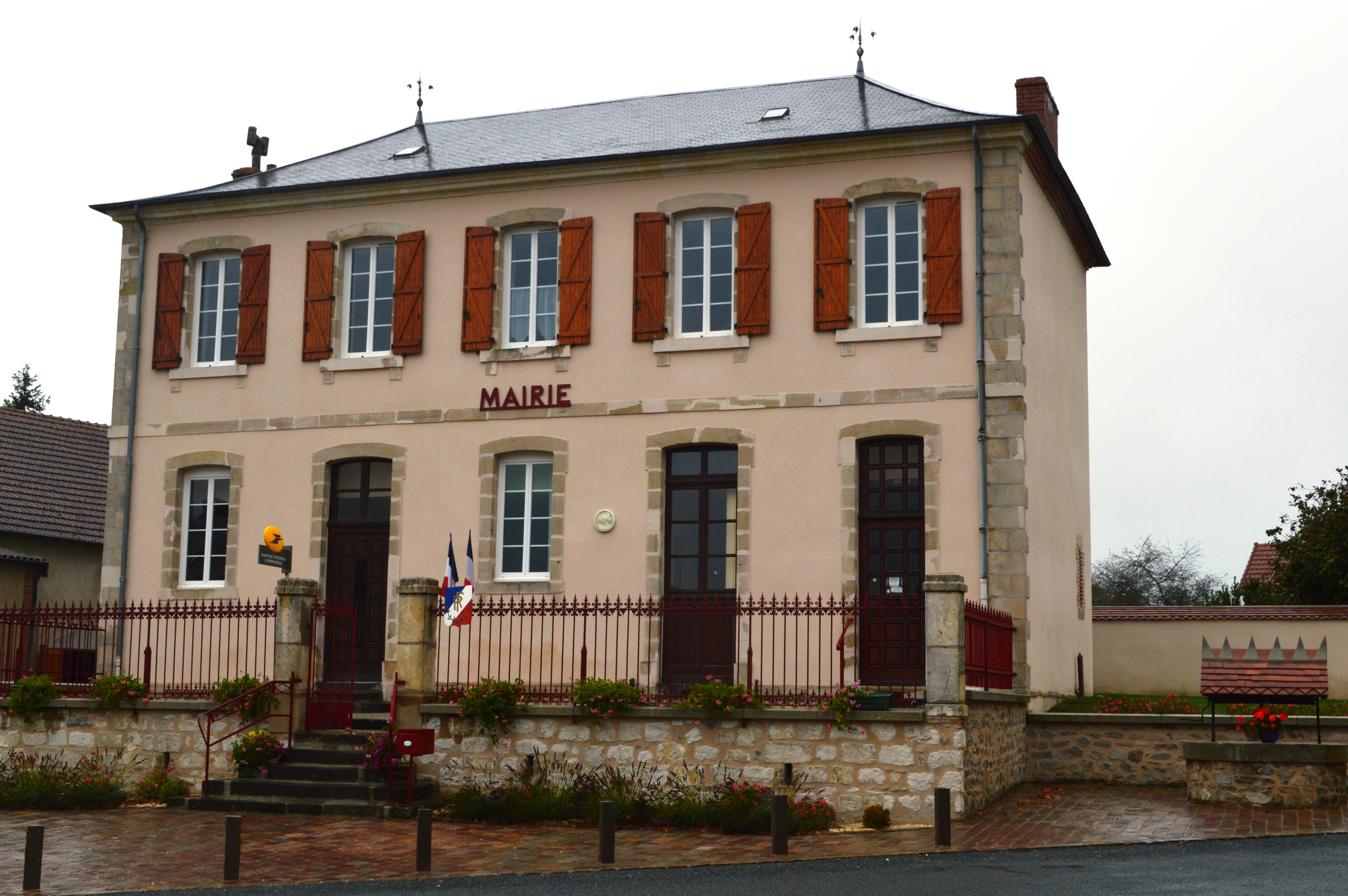
The Town Hall

List of Successive Mayors

From	To	Name	Party
1793	1795	Jean Confession	
1795	1796	Joseph Cajat	
1796	1820	André Labarre	
1820	1821	Hippolyte Garreau	
1821	1848	Pierre Mage	
1848	1850	Nicolas Aucouturier	
1850	1852	Jean-Gilbert Mage	
1850	1852	Perronet	
1852	1878	Jean-Gilbert Mage	
1878	1888	François Cajat	
1888	1892	Antoine Labarre	
1892	1919	Félix Lamoine	
1919		Antonin Gaume	
2001	2008	Georges Liconnet	
2008	Present	Jean Paul Lamoine	PS

== Population ==
Historical population
Year	Pop.	±% p.a.
1968	401	—
1975	358	−1.61%
1982	321	−1.55%
1990	334	+0.50%
1999	307	−0.93%
2007	333	+1.02%
2012	353	+1.17%
2017	356	+0.17%
2023	383	+1.23%
Source: INSEE

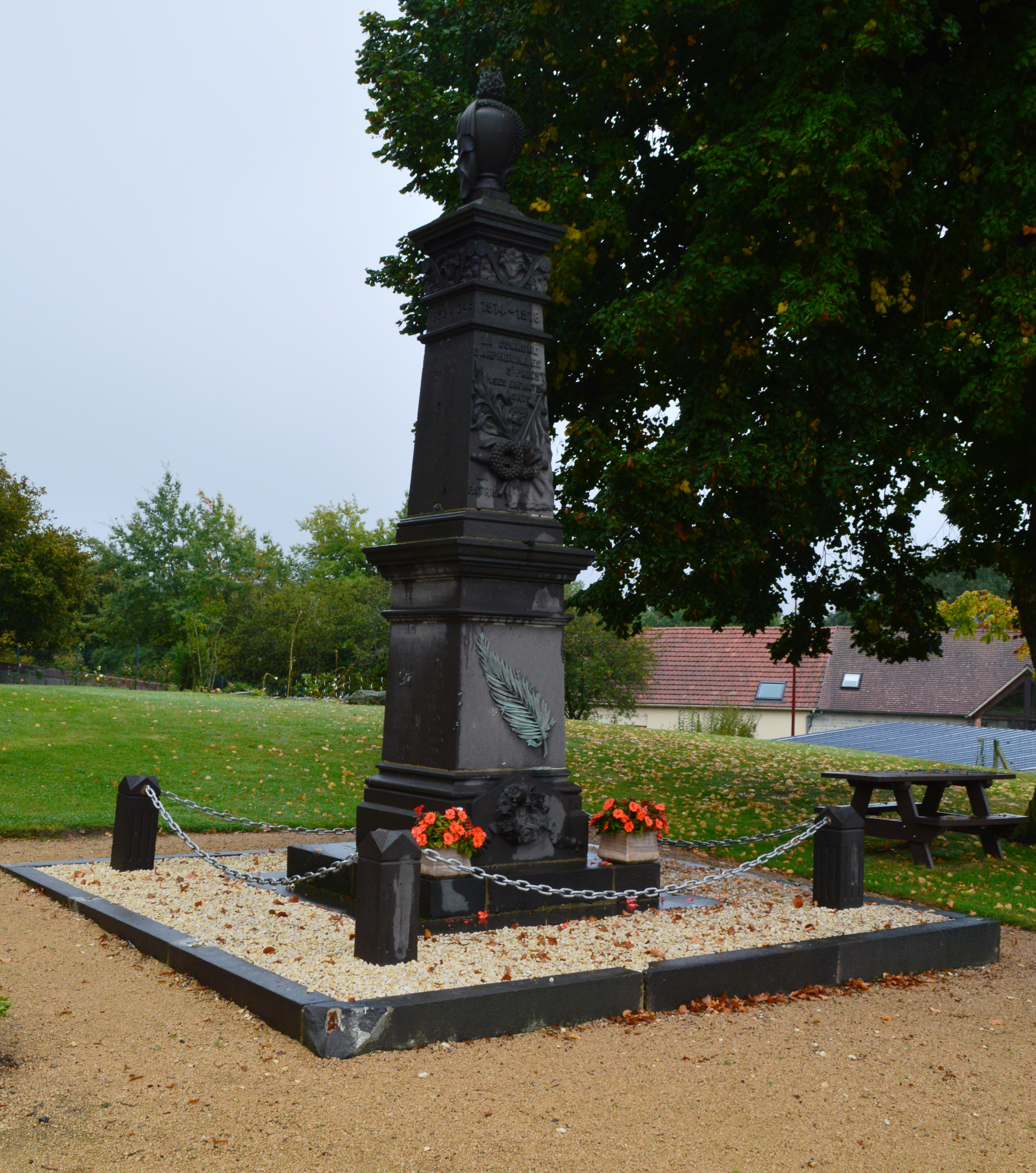
Arpheuilles-Saint-Priest War Memorial

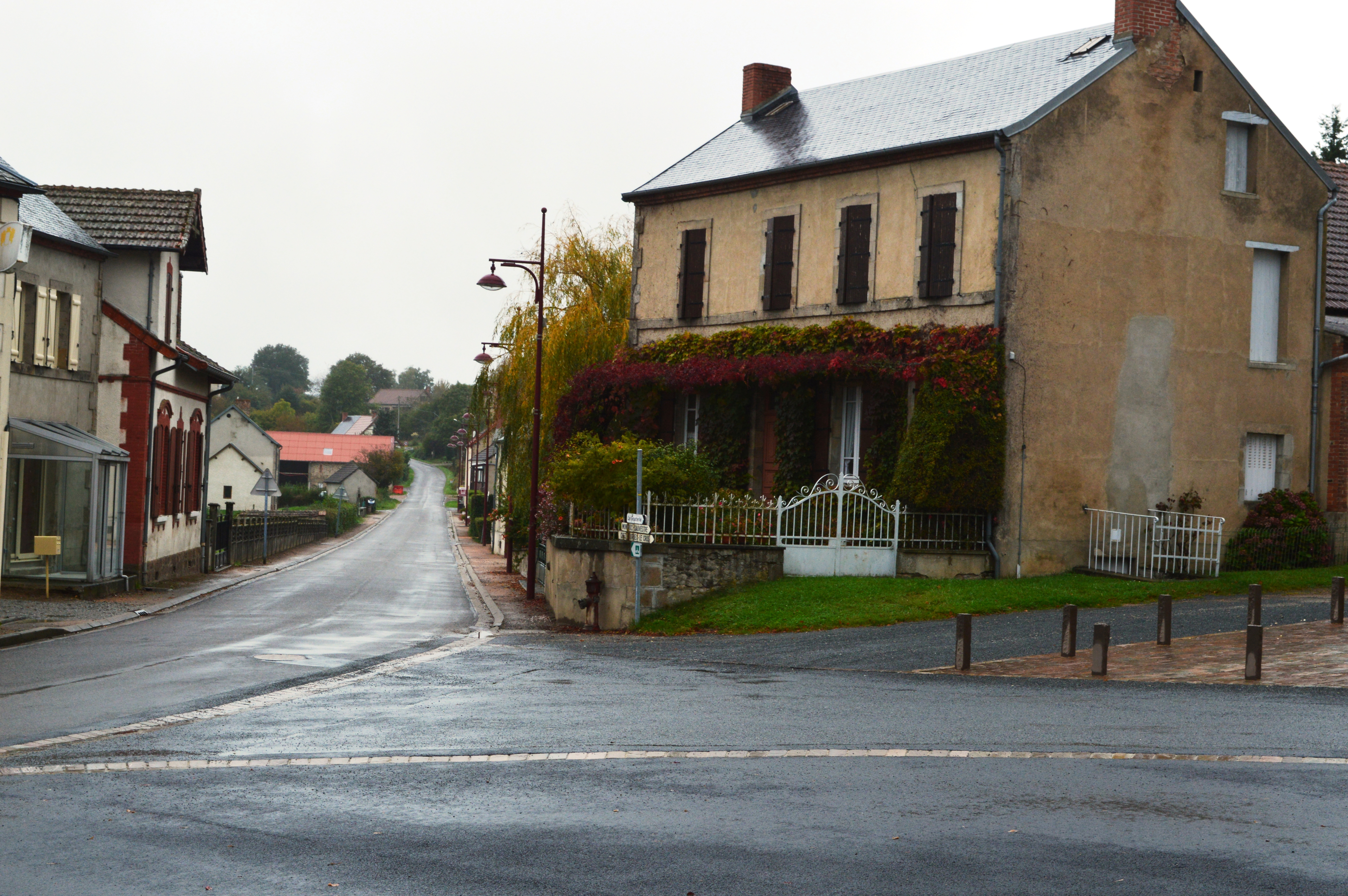
A street in Arpheuilles-Saint-Priest

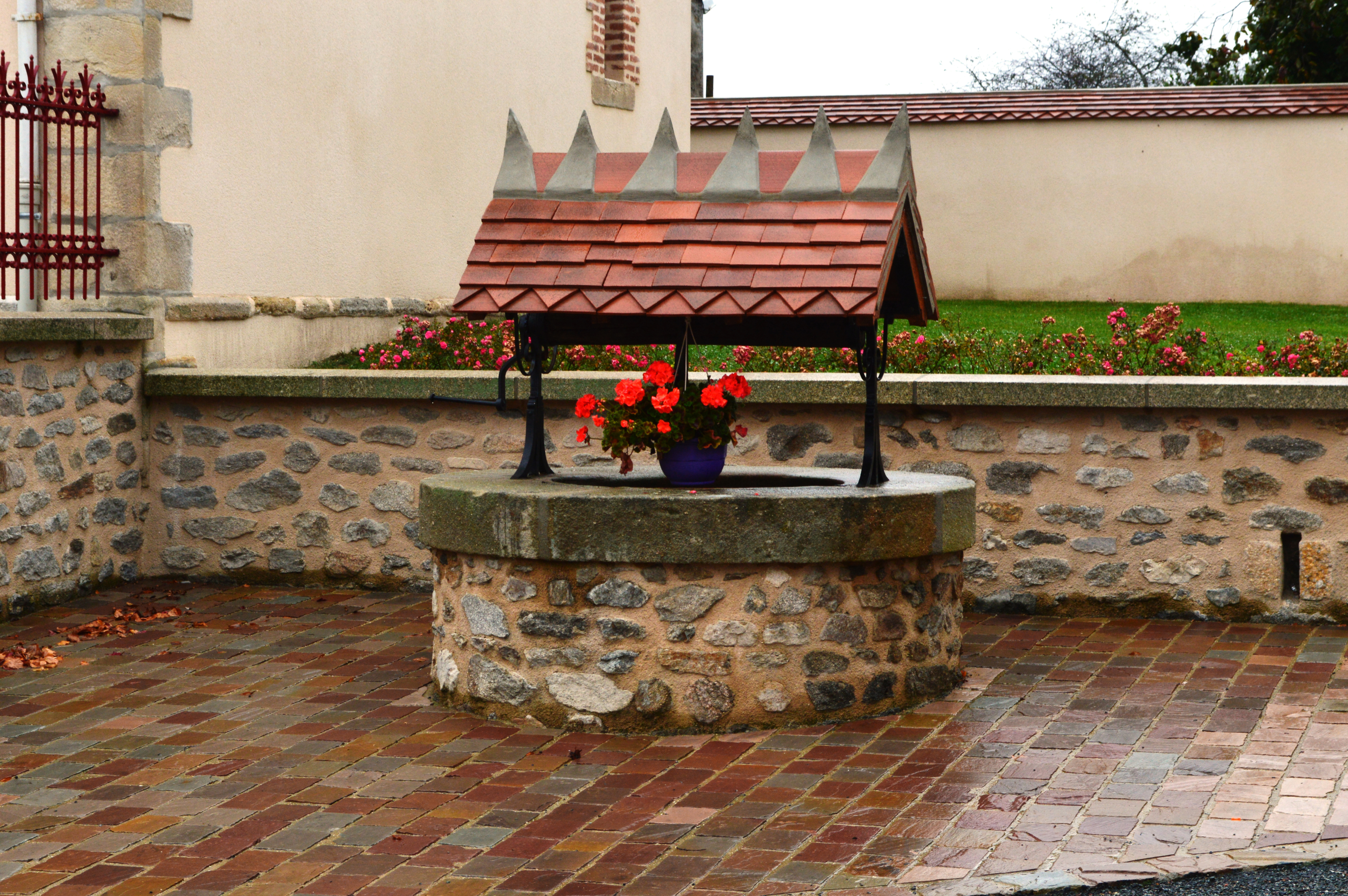
A Well in Arpheuilles-Saint-Priest

== Sites and monuments ==
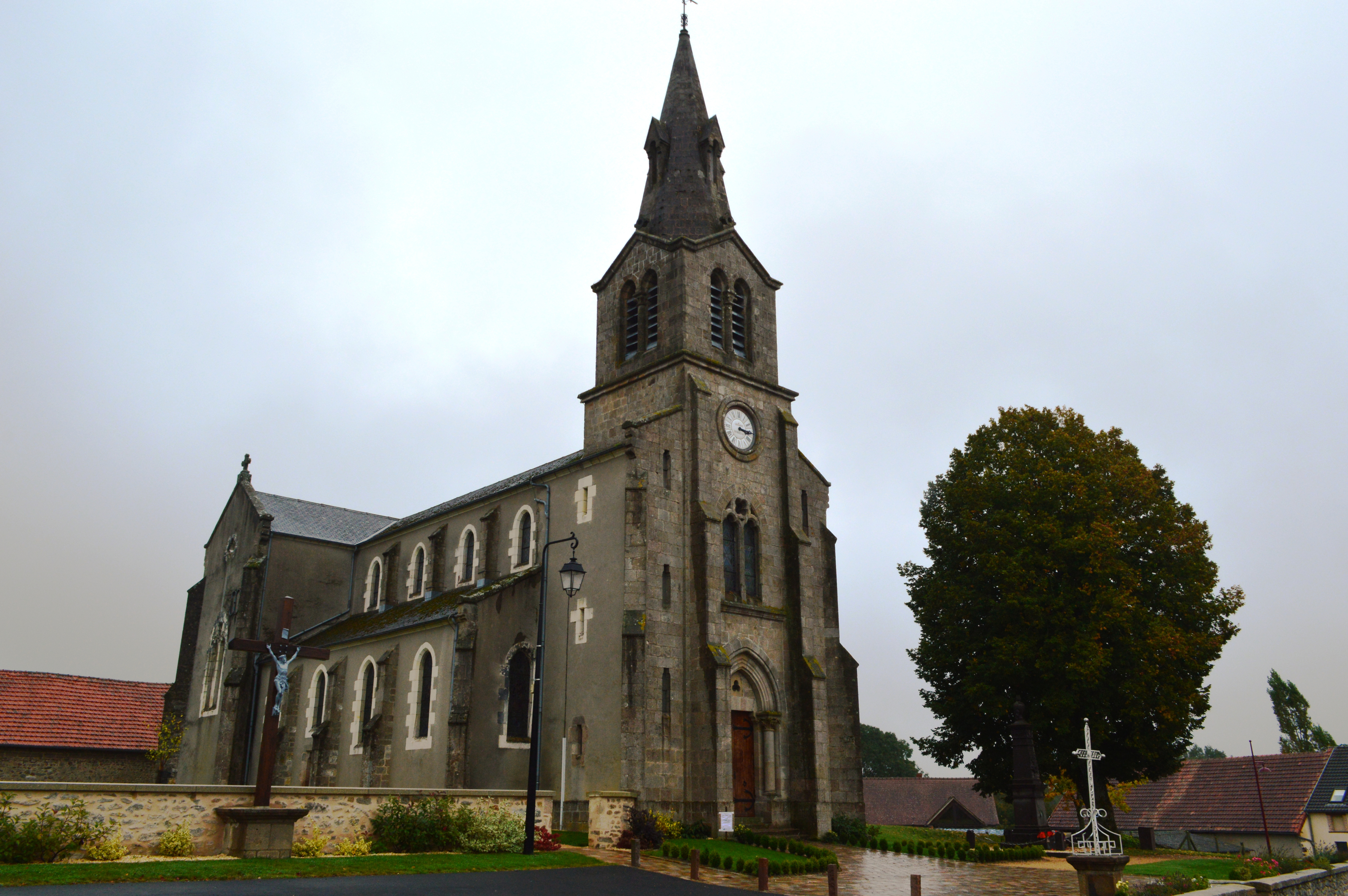
The Church of Saint Peter

- The Church of Saint Peter from the 19th century.

== See also ==
- Communes of the Allier department
