= Christophe Thivrier =

French politician and mayor (1841–1895)

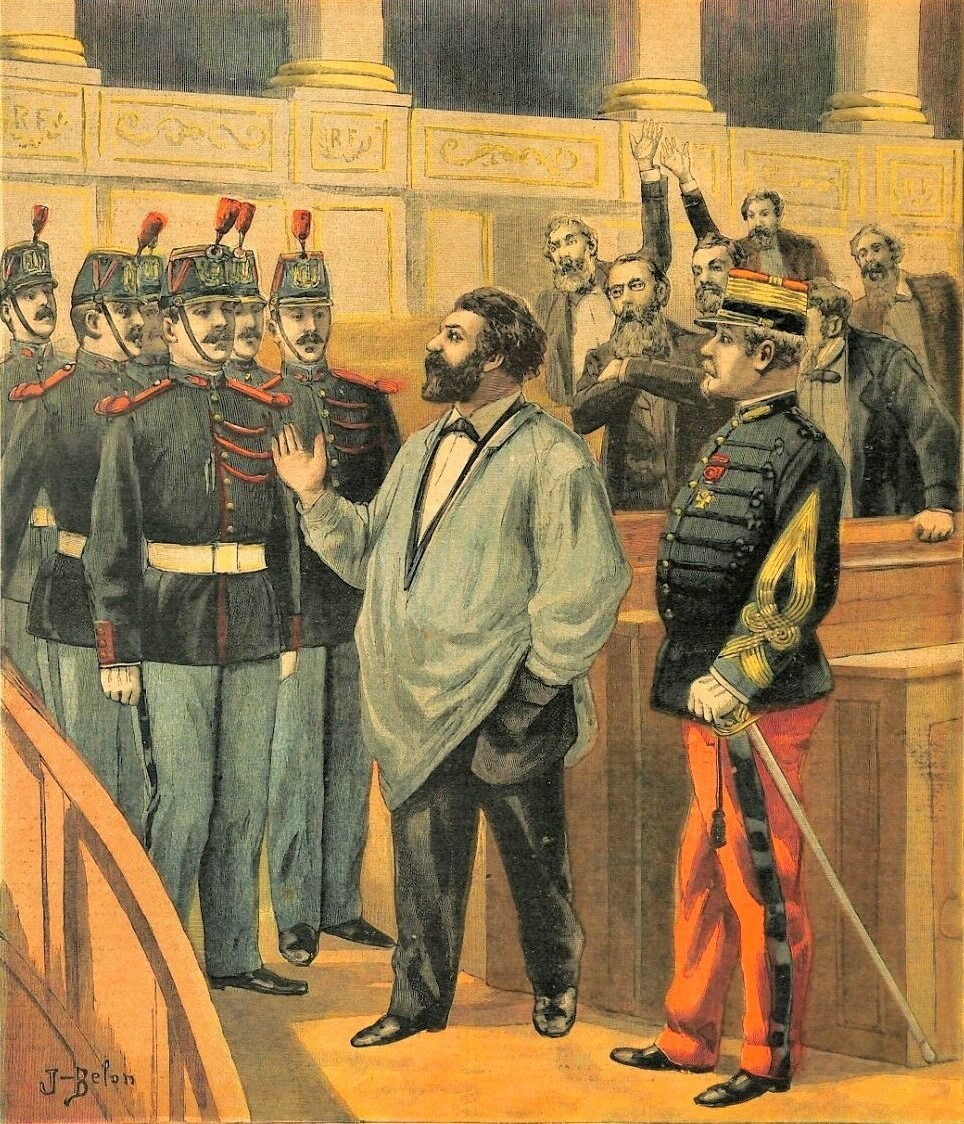
- Christophe Thivrier being evicted from the Chamber of Deputies. From Le Petit Journal, 18 February 1894

Deputy of Allier
- In office 6 October 1889 – 8 August 1895

Personal details
- Born: Christophe Tivrier; 16 May 1841 Durdat-Larequille, Allier, France
- Died: 8 August 1895 (aged 54) Commentry, Allier, France
- Occupation: Politician

Christophe Thivrier (16 May 1841 – 8 August 1895) was a French politician of working class origins who was the first Socialist mayor in France, and deputy of Allier from 1889 to 1895. At this time the industrialists of France were using dismissals and other forms of repression in an attempt to stamp out socialism, and workers were responding with strikes. Thivrier was uncompromising in his socialist principles, and was known as the "deputé en blouse" for wearing his blue worker's smock in the Assembly to the outrage of the bourgeois members.

== Early years 1841–74 ==
Christophe Thivrier (or Tivrier, known as Christou) was born on 16 May 1841 in Durdat-Larequille, Allier, the youngest of four children. His parents were Jean Gilbert Thivrier (1809–1904) and Marie Anne Mansier (1799–1852). His father was from Néris-les-Bains, and worked as a farm laborer, in construction and in the mines. Christophe had to leave school and start work at an early age. He became a miner. When he was 28 he became a small building contractor, and later became a wine merchant. He was one of the founders of the labour movement in Allier. The "Marianne", a secret society created to fight the reactionary actions of conservatives, often met in his home. On 15 November 1868 he married in Durdat-Larequille to Marie Martin (1842–1932). Their children were Gilbert Alphonse (1869-1936(, Léon Martial (1871-1920), Joseph Isidore (1874-1944) and Louise Angéline (1879-1973).

== Local politics 1874–89 ==
In 1874 Thivrier was elected municipal councilor for Commentry on the Republican list. He was reelected in 1878. In 1879 he became a supporter of collectivism, and on 21 January 1881 he was elected to the council with the entire list of workers and socialists. It was the first town hall in France to be captured by the workers party and the socialists. Thivrier defeated Stéphane Mony, the director of the Société de Commentry, Fourchambault et Decazeville, which owned the local mines, and a former mayor and deputy.

A list was prepared of everyone who had spread socialist propaganda during the elections, including 135 miners. On 4 June 1881 they were all dismissed, and the workers went on strike. Another 300 were added to the list of "agitators" during the strike, and had to pass interviews to get their jobs back after the strike. 60 failed these interviews, and 67 were told they needed certificates of good conduct from their new employers before they could work again at the mines. Miners who had been elected to the local council could not find work and had to leave the district.

Despite this repression, Thivrier was Mayor of Commentry from 4 June 1882, then district councilor, and gained huge support from the working class. Harassment by the prefectural administration against the workers' administration and government persecution prevented the Socialist Party from presenting a list in the elections on 1884, but on 6 May 1888 Thivrier was reelected in triumph and again appointed Mayor of Commentry. He was removed from office on 14 December 1888 for having sent an address of sympathy to the trade union congress in Bordeaux that he signed with his title of mayor. Thivrier's popularity grew, and in 1889 he was elected to the General Council of Allier.

== Deputy 1889–95 ==
Thivrier was elected deputy of Allier on 6 October 1889. In his election manifesto he denounced the oppression and misery of the workers, and proposed social measures such as social support for the old and disabled, responsibility of company owners for workplace accidents, and a direct tax on wealth and income. At the request of the Commentry Socialists he continued to wear his blue worker's blouse (smock) in the Chamber as a symbol of the protest of the proletariat against the privileges of the capitalists, and a symbol of their hope of emancipation. He had campaigned as a Boulangist, but joined the Workers' Party (POF) after being elected. (Note: Antoine Jourde of Bourdeaux and Ernest Ferroul of Narbonne also campaigned as Boulangists but joined the POF soon after being elected. Ferroul and Jourde remained active with the POF until late in the 1890s, but Thivrier would break with the Guesdists and join the Blanquists in 1892 after a heated dispute over the question of general strikes.) Friedrich Engels saw the elections as a success, counting Eugène Baudin, Thivrier and Félix Lachize^{(fr)} as Marxists, and considering that Gustave Paul Cluseret and Ernest Ferroul were "bound to cast in their lot with the first three." However, Baudin, Lachize and Cluseret were never active in the POF, and Thivrier and Ferroul joined the POF after the election.

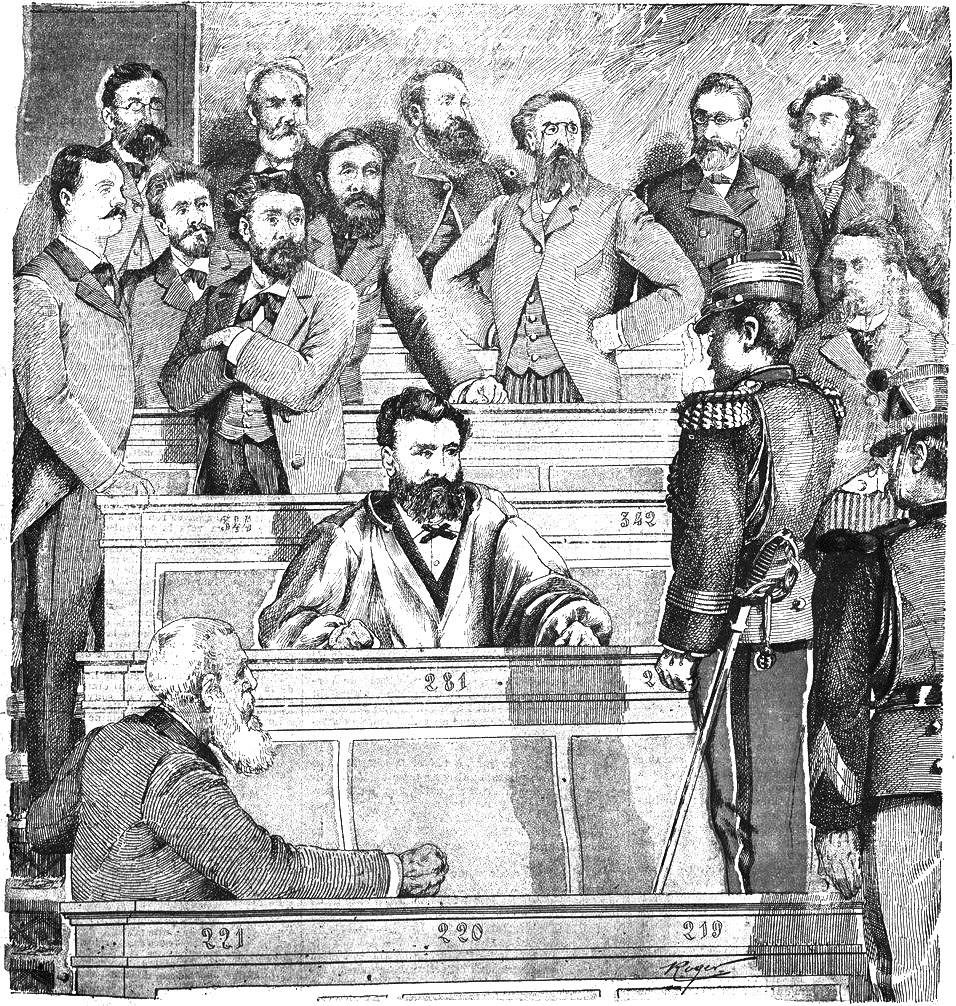
A rendition of Thivrier's expulsion, with the socialist leaders ranged behind him

In 1890 a strike broke out in Commentry due to the dismissal of 300 miners chosen from the most active socialists. Thivrier spoke out against the interventions and provocations of the army and gendarmerie in support of the mining company. Thivrier was a delegate of the French Workers' Party at the Congress of Lille and Calais (1890) and at the International Congress of Brussels. He was soon criticized by his party for his sympathy with the Blanquist Central Revolutionary Committee (CRC). His relationship with Jean Dormoy^{(fr)} and the Montluçon socialists became strained. At the 1892 National Guesdist Congress in Marseille Thivrier raised violent controversy by defending the general strike. He resigned from the party soon after and led most of the Commentry socialist organizations into membership of the CRC.

On 1 May 1893 the government ordered closure of the Labor Exchange (Bourse du Travail). There was a protest, and just after Édouard Vaillant had addressed the crowd the police charged the demonstrators. Thuvrier joined with Eugène Baudin, Jean-Baptiste Dumay and Alexandre Millerand in protesting to the government. Thivrier was reelected on 3 September 1893, holding office until 8 August 1895. In 1893 Henri Ghesquière^{(fr)}, a Guesdist leader, reported in La Socialiste Troyen that when Thivrier entered the Assembly wearing his worker's blouse (smock) he was greeted by an uproar among the bourgeois leaders. Ghesquière commented that, "... a clean blue smock has every right to be worn in the Assembly, as does a frock, because if clothes do not make the man, neither does the frock make the legislator."

Thivrier's program in the 1893 elections included an 8-hour day and one day of rest per week, protection and education for children, equal pay for men and women, participation of workers in developing shop rules, nationalization of the banks and railways and operation of state factories by the workers. On 27 January 1894 Thivrier was temporarily excluded from the Assembly for having shouted "Long live the Commune!" during a debate on attacks on personal liberty. He was invited by President Charles Dupuy to explain himself from the tribune. He said that unlike the Auvergne deputy [Dupuy] he fully believed what he said. The session was suspended for half an hour and he was forcibly expelled. When the session was resumed Édouard Vaillant took up Thivrier's defense with a glowing eulogy of the Paris Commune.

Thivrier resigned from his seat in the departmental council in 1890 to make way for one of his friends, was reelected in 1892 but was defeated in 1895. He died on 8 August 1895 in Commentry after a short illness. He was given a large funeral by the people of Commentry. The main street in Commentry carries his name.

== Publications ==
Thrivier was Directeur de publication of the Socialiste of Commentry. While in the Chamber of Deputies Thrivier co-authored a legislative proposal.

- Le Socialiste, vol. 1st year, n°1 (20 April 1889) – n° 12 (7 July 1889). 13 October 1889 – 23 February 1890, Commentry
- Valentin Couturier; Christophe Thivrier; Félix Lachize (13 February 1890), Proposition de loi tendant à modifier les dispositions de la loi du 23 aout 1871 relative au timbre des quittances (Chambre des Députés. 5e législature, session 1890, n ° 351), Paris: Motteroz / France. Chambre des députés, p. 3

== Sources ==
- Chenut, Helen (2010-11-01), Fabric of Gender: Working-Class Culture in Third Republic France, Penn State Press, ISBN 978-0-271-04625-9
- Christophe Thivrier (1841-1895) (in French), BnF: Bibliotheque nationale de France
- Christophe Tivrier dit Thivrier (in French), Assemblée nationale
- Derfler, Leslie (2009-06-30), Paul Lafargue and the Flowering of French Socialism, 1882-1911, Harvard University Press, ISBN 978-0-674-03422-8
- Jolly, Jean (1960), "THIVRIER, CHRISTOPHE", dictionnaire des parlementaires français de 1889 à 1940 (in French)
- Jolly, Jean (1960b), "Baudin (Eugène)", dictionnaire des parlementaires français de 1889 à 1940 (in French)
- Peaucelle, Jean-Louis (2015-07-22), Henri Fayol, the Manager, Routledge, ISBN 978-1-317-31939-9
- Ponge, Bernard, "Christophe (mineur) THIVRIER (de DURDAT-LAREQUILLE) Dit Christou", geneanet (in French)
- Steenson, Gary P. (1991-06-15), After Marx, Before Lenin: Marxism and Socialist Working-Class Parties in Europe, 1884-1914, University of Pittsburgh Pre, ISBN 978-0-8229-7673-8
