= Mireille Schurch =

French politician

Mireille Schurch (born 4 January 1949, Lignerolles, Allier) was a member of the Senate of France, representing the Allier department as a member of the Communist, Republican, and Citizen Group (Union des communistes de France marxiste-léniniste; UCFml).

== Biography ==
Professor of secondary-school physics, she entered parliamentary politics following Pierre Goldberg, the former deputy mayor of Montlucon, after having been, since May 68, a militant Maoist with the UCFml. She was elected mayor of Lignerolles in 1995. On July 11, 2004, she was counsel general for the canton of Montlucon-Sud.
