= Montluçon Communauté =

- Communauté d'agglomération
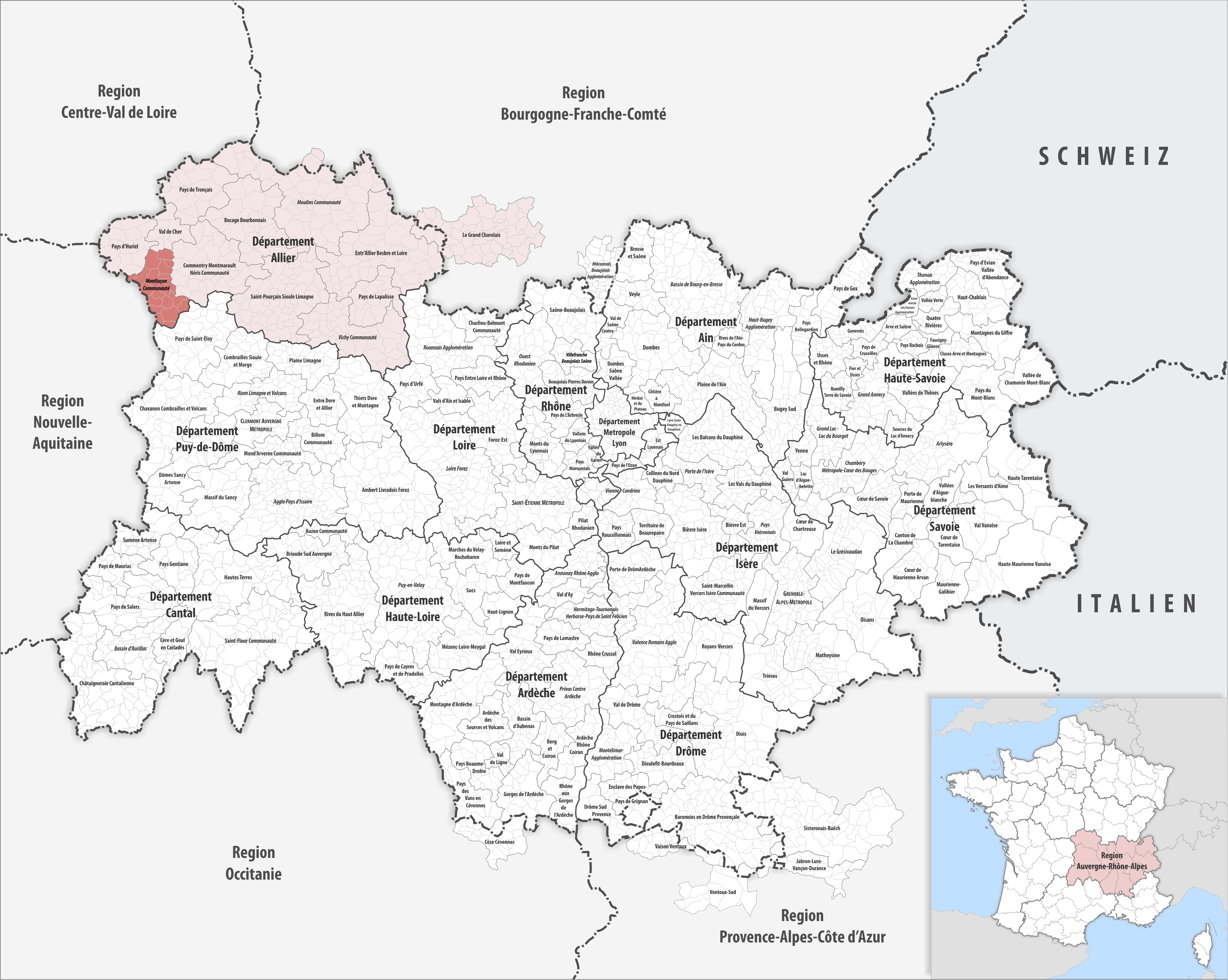
- Location within the department
- Coordinates: 46°16′N 02°35′E
- Country: France
- Region: Auvergne-Rhône-Alpes
- Department: Allier
- No. of communes: {{{nbcomm}}}
- Established: 2017

Government
  - President: Frédéric Laporte (LR)
- Area: 377.8 km^{2} (145.9 sq mi)
- Population (2023): 59,142
  - Density: 156.5/km^{2} (405.4/sq mi)
- Website: www.montlucon-communaute.com

Montluçon Communauté is the communauté d'agglomération, an intercommunal structure, centred on the town of Montluçon. It is located in the Allier department, in the Auvergne-Rhône-Alpes region, central France. Created in 2017, its seat is in Montluçon. Its area is 377.8 km^{2}. Its population was 59,380 in 2022, of which 33,317 in Montluçon proper.

== Communal territory ==
=== Composition ===
The communauté d'agglomération consists of the following 21 communes:

1. Arpheuilles-Saint-Priest
2. Désertines
3. Domérat
4. Lamaids
5. Lavault-Sainte-Anne
6. Lignerolles
7. Marcillat-en-Combraille
8. Mazirat
9. Montluçon
10. La Petite-Marche
11. Prémilhat
12. Quinssaines
13. Ronnet
14. Sainte-Thérence
15. Saint-Fargeol
16. Saint-Genest
17. Saint-Marcel-en-Marcillat
18. Saint-Victor
19. Teillet-Argenty
20. Terjat
21. Villebret

== Demographics ==
Historical population
Year	Pop.	±% p.a.
1968	77,305	—
1975	77,667	+0.07%
1982	73,821	−0.72%
1990	69,144	−0.81%
1999	66,185	−0.48%
2007	65,341	−0.16%
2012	64,160	−0.36%
2017	61,905	−0.71%
2023	59,142	−0.76%
Source: INSEE

== See also ==
- List of intercommunalities of the Allier department
