= Mazirat =

- Commune
- Coat of arms
- Location of Mazirat
- Location within France Location within Auvergne-Rhône-Alpes
- Coordinates: 46°13′25″N 2°32′26″E
- Country: France
- Region: Auvergne-Rhône-Alpes
- Department: Allier
- Arrondissement: Montluçon
- Canton: Montluçon-3
- Intercommunality: CA Montluçon Communauté

Government
  - Mayor (2026–32): Magalie Jarraud
- Area^{1}: 20.26 km^{2} (7.82 sq mi)
- Elevation: 400 m (1,300 ft)
- Highest elevation: 495 m (1,624 ft)
- Lowest elevation: 259 m (850 ft)
- Population (2023): 273
  - Density: 13.5/km^{2} (34.9/sq mi)
- Time zone: UTC+01:00 (CET)
  - Summer (DST): UTC+02:00 (CEST)
- INSEE/Postal code: 03167 /03420
- ^{1} French Land Register data, which excludes lakes, ponds, glaciers > 1 km^{2} (0.386 sq mi or 247 acres) and river estuaries.

Mazirat (French pronunciation: [maziʁa]; Occitan: Mazeirac) is a commune in the Allier department in central France.

== Population ==
Historical population
Year	Pop.	±% p.a.
1968	400	—
1975	320	−3.14%
1982	297	−1.06%
1990	301	+0.17%
1999	267	−1.32%
2007	286	+0.86%
2012	284	−0.14%
2017	282	−0.14%
2023	273	−0.54%
Source: INSEE

== See also ==
- Communes of the Allier department
