= Canton of Montluçon-3 =

Coordinates: 46.33°N 2.61°E

- Canton
- Situation of the canton of Montluçon-3 in the department of Allier
- Country: France
- Region: Auvergne-Rhône-Alpes
- Department: Allier
- No. of communes: {{{nbcomm}}}
- Population (2023): 17,689
- INSEE code: 0311

The canton of Montluçon-3 is an administrative division of the Allier department, in central France. It was created at the French canton reorganisation which came into effect in March 2015. Its seat is in Montluçon.

It consists of the following communes:

1. Arpheuilles-Saint-Priest
2. La Celle
3. Durdat-Larequille
4. Marcillat-en-Combraille
5. Mazirat
6. Montluçon (partly)
7. Néris-les-Bains
8. La Petite-Marche
9. Ronnet
10. Sainte-Thérence
11. Saint-Fargeol
12. Saint-Genest
13. Saint-Marcel-en-Marcillat
14. Terjat
15. Villebret
