= Sainte-Thérence =

- Commune
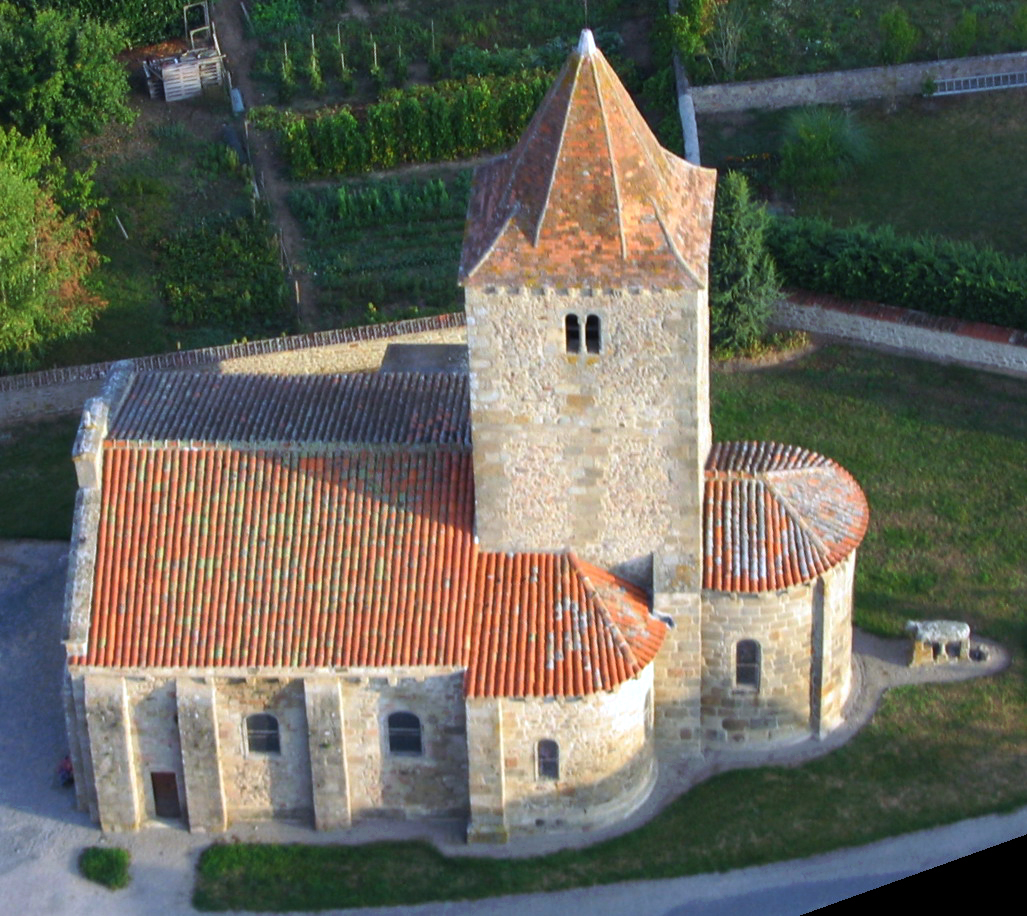
- The church in Sainte-Thérence

- Coat of arms
- Location of Sainte-Thérence
- Location within France Location within Auvergne-Rhône-Alpes
- Coordinates: 46°14′36″N 2°33′40″E
- Country: France
- Region: Auvergne-Rhône-Alpes
- Department: Allier
- Arrondissement: Montluçon
- Canton: Montluçon-3
- Intercommunality: CA Montluçon Communauté

Government
  - Mayor (2026–32): Bernard Denest
- Area^{1}: 13.14 km^{2} (5.07 sq mi)
- Elevation: 400 m (1,300 ft)
- Highest elevation: 458 m (1,503 ft)
- Lowest elevation: 235 m (771 ft)
- Population (2023): 179
  - Density: 13.6/km^{2} (35.3/sq mi)
- Time zone: UTC+01:00 (CET)
  - Summer (DST): UTC+02:00 (CEST)
- INSEE/Postal code: 03261 /03420
- ^{1} French Land Register data, which excludes lakes, ponds, glaciers > 1 km^{2} (0.386 sq mi or 247 acres) and river estuaries.

Sainte-Thérence (French pronunciation: [sɛ̃t teʁɑ̃s]; Occitan: Santa-Terença) is a commune in the Allier department in Auvergne-Rhône-Alpes in central France.

== Population ==
Historical population
Year	Pop.	±% p.a.
1968	205	—
1975	179	−1.92%
1982	147	−2.77%
1990	156	+0.75%
1999	188	+2.09%
2007	200	+0.78%
2012	202	+0.20%
2017	184	−1.85%
2023	179	−0.46%
Source: INSEE

== See also ==
- Communes of the Allier department
