= Saint-Marcel-en-Marcillat =

- Commune
- Coat of arms
- Location of Saint-Marcel-en-Marcillat
- Location within France Location within Auvergne-Rhône-Alpes
- Coordinates: 46°08′46″N 2°35′25″E
- Country: France
- Region: Auvergne-Rhône-Alpes
- Department: Allier
- Arrondissement: Montluçon
- Canton: Montluçon-3
- Intercommunality: CA Montluçon Communauté

Government
  - Mayor (2026–32): Alain Verge
- Area^{1}: 10.55 km^{2} (4.07 sq mi)
- Highest elevation: 534 m (1,752 ft)
- Lowest elevation: 331 m (1,086 ft)
- Population (2023): 130
  - Density: 12/km^{2} (32/sq mi)
- Time zone: UTC+01:00 (CET)
  - Summer (DST): UTC+02:00 (CEST)
- INSEE/Postal code: 03244 /03420
- ^{1} French Land Register data, which excludes lakes, ponds, glaciers > 1 km^{2} (0.386 sq mi or 247 acres) and river estuaries.

Saint-Marcel-en-Marcillat (French pronunciation: [sɛ̃ maʁsɛl ɑ̃ maʁsija]; Occitan: Sant Marcel de Marcilhac) is a commune in the Allier department in Auvergne-Rhône-Alpes in central France.

== Population ==
Historical population
Year	Pop.	±% p.a.
1968	264	—
1975	234	−1.71%
1982	186	−3.23%
1990	188	+0.13%
1999	138	−3.38%
2007	144	+0.53%
2012	149	+0.68%
2017	136	−1.81%
2023	130	−0.75%
Source: INSEE

== See also ==
- Communes of the Allier department
