= Terjat =

- Commune
- Coat of arms
- Location of Terjat
- Location within France Location within Auvergne-Rhône-Alpes
- Coordinates: 46°12′16″N 2°36′58″E
- Country: France
- Region: Auvergne-Rhône-Alpes
- Department: Allier
- Arrondissement: Montluçon
- Canton: Montluçon-3
- Intercommunality: CA Montluçon Communauté

Government
  - Mayor (2026–32): Jérôme Pernelle
- Area^{1}: 17.74 km^{2} (6.85 sq mi)
- Elevation: 515 m (1,690 ft)
- Highest elevation: 541 m (1,775 ft)
- Lowest elevation: 378 m (1,240 ft)
- Population (2023): 180
  - Density: 10/km^{2} (26/sq mi)
- Time zone: UTC+01:00 (CET)
  - Summer (DST): UTC+02:00 (CEST)
- INSEE/Postal code: 03280 /03420
- ^{1} French Land Register data, which excludes lakes, ponds, glaciers > 1 km^{2} (0.386 sq mi or 247 acres) and river estuaries.

Terjat (French pronunciation: [tɛʁʒa]; Occitan: Terjac) is a commune in the Allier department in Auvergne-Rhône-Alpes in central France.

== Population ==
Historical population
| Year | Pop. | ±% p.a. |
|---|---|---|
| 1968 | 303 | — |
| 1975 | 255 | −2.43% |
| 1982 | 244 | −0.63% |
| 1990 | 238 | −0.31% |
| 1999 | 228 | −0.48% |
| 2007 | 219 | −0.50% |
| 2012 | 213 | −0.55% |
| 2017 | 196 | −1.65% |
| 2023 | 180 | −1.41% |
Source: INSEE

== See also ==
- Communes of the Allier department
