= Saint-Genest, Allier =

Saint-Genest
- Commune
- Coat of arms
- Location of Saint-Genest
- Location within France Location within Auvergne-Rhône-Alpes
- Coordinates: 46°15′52″N 2°35′39″E
- Country: France
- Region: Auvergne-Rhône-Alpes
- Department: Allier
- Arrondissement: Montluçon
- Canton: Montluçon-3
- Intercommunality: CA Montluçon Communauté

Government
  - Mayor (2026–32): Serge Vernadat
- Area^{1}: 15.17 km^{2} (5.86 sq mi)
- Elevation: 330 m (1,080 ft)
- Highest elevation: 451 m (1,480 ft)
- Lowest elevation: 214 m (702 ft)
- Population (2023): 386
  - Density: 25.4/km^{2} (65.9/sq mi)
- Time zone: UTC+01:00 (CET)
  - Summer (DST): UTC+02:00 (CEST)
- INSEE/Postal code: 03233 /03310
- ^{1} French Land Register data, which excludes lakes, ponds, glaciers > 1 km^{2} (0.386 sq mi or 247 acres) and river estuaries.

Saint-Genest is a commune in the Allier department in Auvergne-Rhône-Alpes in central France.

== Population ==
Historical population
Year	Pop.	±% p.a.
1968	264	—
1975	242	−1.24%
1982	252	+0.58%
1990	322	+3.11%
1999	347	+0.83%
2007	364	+0.60%
2012	347	−0.95%
2017	407	+3.24%
2023	386	−0.88%
Source: INSEE

== See also ==
- Communes of the Allier department
