= La Petite-Marche =

- Commune
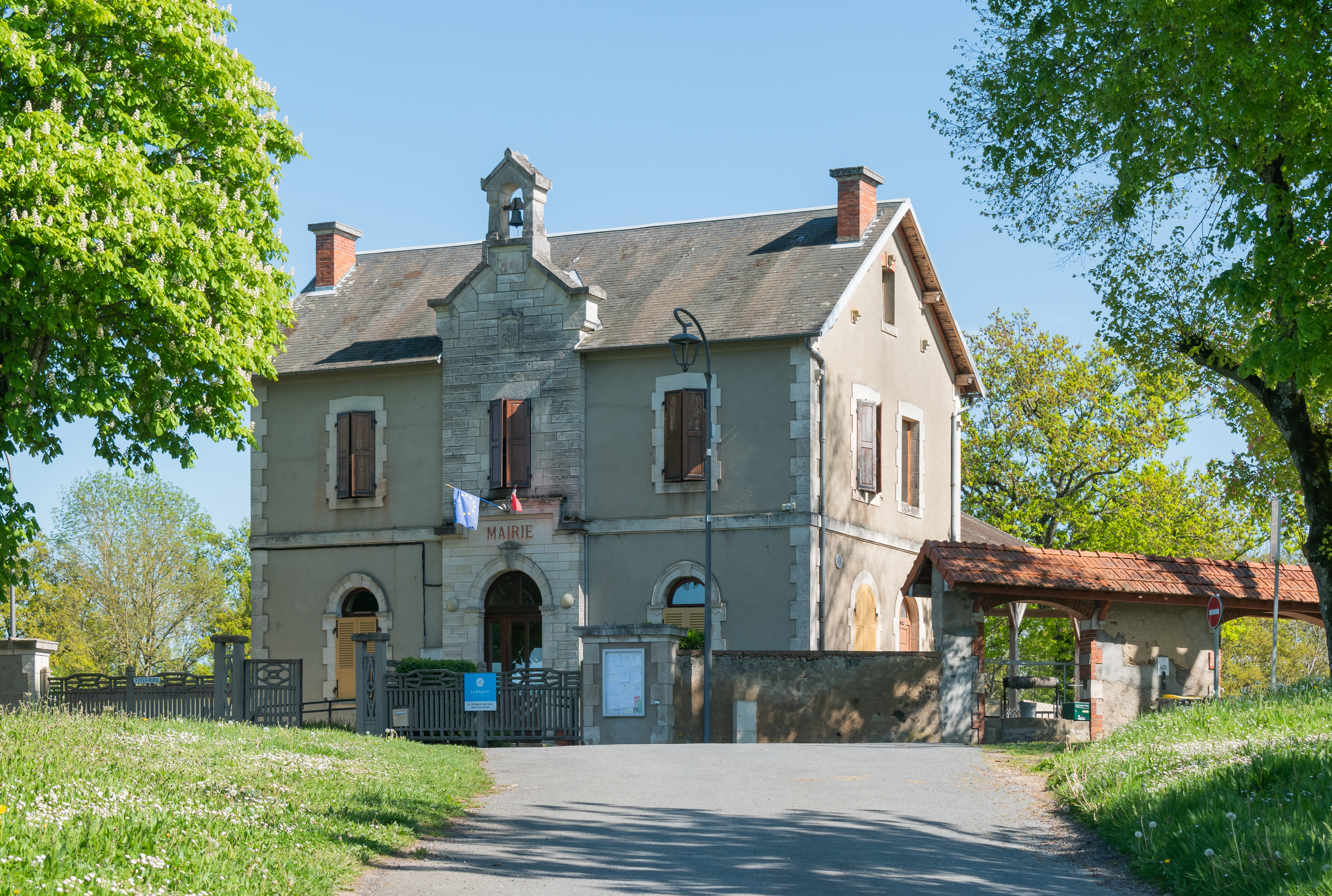
- Town hall of La Petite-Marche

- Coat of arms
- Location of La Petite-Marche
- Location within France Location within Auvergne-Rhône-Alpes
- Coordinates: 46°11′40″N 2°34′21″E
- Country: France
- Region: Auvergne-Rhône-Alpes
- Department: Allier
- Arrondissement: Montluçon
- Canton: Montluçon-3
- Intercommunality: CA Montluçon Communauté

Government
  - Mayor (2026–32): Didier Imbert
- Area^{1}: 14.93 km^{2} (5.76 sq mi)
- Elevation: 460 m (1,510 ft)
- Highest elevation: 505 m (1,657 ft)
- Lowest elevation: 310 m (1,020 ft)
- Population (2023): 167
  - Density: 11.2/km^{2} (29.0/sq mi)
- Time zone: UTC+01:00 (CET)
  - Summer (DST): UTC+02:00 (CEST)
- INSEE/Postal code: 03206 /03420
- ^{1} French Land Register data, which excludes lakes, ponds, glaciers > 1 km^{2} (0.386 sq mi or 247 acres) and river estuaries.

La Petite-Marche (French pronunciation: [la pətit maʁʃ]; Occitan: La Marchia) is a commune in the Allier department in Auvergne in central France.

== Population ==
Historical population
Year	Pop.	±% p.a.
1968	321	—
1975	247	−3.67%
1982	210	−2.29%
1990	210	+0.00%
1999	215	+0.26%
2007	187	−1.73%
2012	196	+0.94%
2017	176	−2.13%
2023	167	−0.87%
Source: INSEE

== See also ==
- Communes of the Allier department
