= Saint-Fargeol =

- Commune
- Coat of arms
- Location of Saint-Fargeol
- Location within France Location within Auvergne-Rhône-Alpes
- Coordinates: 46°08′20″N 2°37′45″E
- Country: France
- Region: Auvergne-Rhône-Alpes
- Department: Allier
- Arrondissement: Montluçon
- Canton: Montluçon-3
- Intercommunality: CA Montluçon Communauté

Government
  - Mayor (2026–32): Fernando Azevedo
- Area^{1}: 10.36 km^{2} (4.00 sq mi)
- Elevation: 550 m (1,800 ft)
- Highest elevation: 573 m (1,880 ft)
- Lowest elevation: 434 m (1,424 ft)
- Population (2023): 187
  - Density: 18.1/km^{2} (46.7/sq mi)
- Time zone: UTC+01:00 (CET)
  - Summer (DST): UTC+02:00 (CEST)
- INSEE/Postal code: 03231 /03420
- ^{1} French Land Register data, which excludes lakes, ponds, glaciers > 1 km^{2} (0.386 sq mi or 247 acres) and river estuaries.

Saint-Fargeol (French pronunciation: [sɛ̃ faʁʒɔl]) is a commune in the Allier department in Auvergne-Rhône-Alpes in central France. It is named after the ancient martyr Saint Ferrutio.

== Population ==
Historical population
Year	Pop.	±% p.a.
1968	311	—
1975	284	−1.29%
1982	249	−1.86%
1990	229	−1.04%
1999	218	−0.55%
2007	217	−0.06%
2012	201	−1.52%
2017	190	−1.12%
2023	187	−0.26%
Source: INSEE

== See also ==
- Communes of the Allier department
