= Villebret =

- Commune
- Coat of arms
- Location of Villebret
- Location within France Location within Auvergne-Rhône-Alpes
- Coordinates: 46°16′04″N 2°38′22″E
- Country: France
- Region: Auvergne-Rhône-Alpes
- Department: Allier
- Arrondissement: Montluçon
- Canton: Montluçon-3
- Intercommunality: CA Montluçon Communauté

Government
  - Mayor (2026–32): Philippe Glomot
- Area^{1}: 15.34 km^{2} (5.92 sq mi)
- Elevation: 330 m (1,080 ft)
- Highest elevation: 496 m (1,627 ft)
- Lowest elevation: 210 m (690 ft)
- Population (2023): 1,335
  - Density: 87.03/km^{2} (225.4/sq mi)
- Time zone: UTC+01:00 (CET)
  - Summer (DST): UTC+02:00 (CEST)
- INSEE/Postal code: 03314 /03310
- ^{1} French Land Register data, which excludes lakes, ponds, glaciers > 1 km^{2} (0.386 sq mi or 247 acres) and river estuaries.

Villebret (French pronunciation: [vilbʁɛ]; Occitan: Vilabrèt) is a commune in the Allier department in Auvergne-Rhône-Alpes in central France.

== Population ==
Historical population
| Year | Pop. | ±% p.a. |
|---|---|---|
| 1968 | 479 | — |
| 1975 | 512 | +0.96% |
| 1982 | 696 | +4.48% |
| 1990 | 865 | +2.75% |
| 1999 | 1,021 | +1.86% |
| 2007 | 1,248 | +2.54% |
| 2012 | 1,291 | +0.68% |
| 2017 | 1,316 | +0.38% |
| 2023 | 1,335 | +0.24% |
Source: INSEE

== See also ==
- Communes of the Allier department
