= Lavault-Sainte-Anne =

- Commune
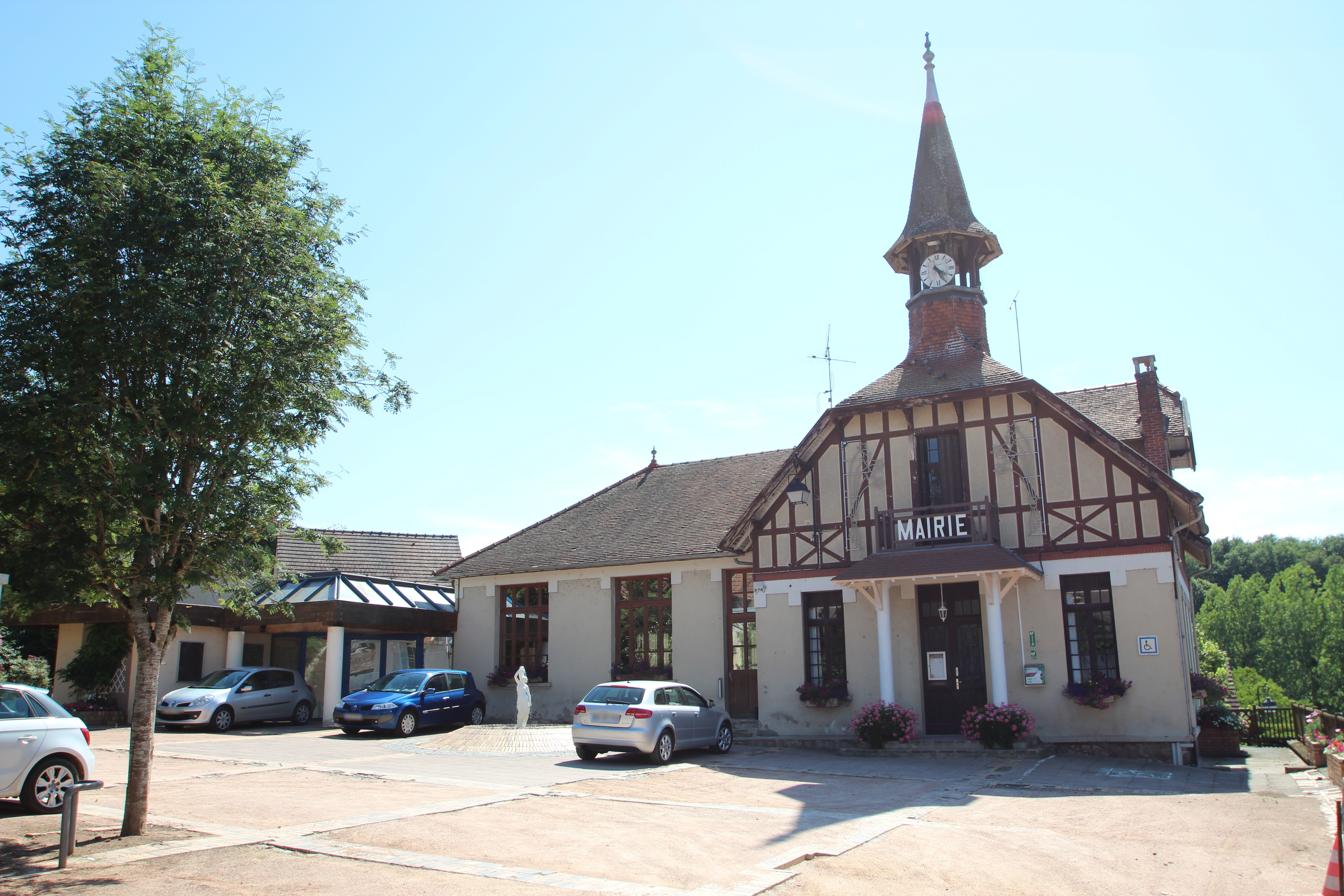
- The town hall in Lavault-Sainte-Anne
- Location of Lavault-Sainte-Anne
- Location within France Location within Auvergne-Rhône-Alpes
- Coordinates: 46°18′39″N 2°36′04″E
- Country: France
- Region: Auvergne-Rhône-Alpes
- Department: Allier
- Arrondissement: Montluçon
- Canton: Montluçon-4
- Intercommunality: CA Montluçon Communauté

Government
  - Mayor (2026–32): Samir Triki
- Area^{1}: 9.08 km^{2} (3.51 sq mi)
- Elevation: 223 m (732 ft)
- Highest elevation: 332 m (1,089 ft)
- Lowest elevation: 203 m (666 ft)
- Population (2023): 1,139
  - Density: 125/km^{2} (325/sq mi)
- Time zone: UTC+01:00 (CET)
  - Summer (DST): UTC+02:00 (CEST)
- INSEE/Postal code: 03140 /03100
- ^{1} French Land Register data, which excludes lakes, ponds, glaciers > 1 km^{2} (0.386 sq mi or 247 acres) and river estuaries.

Lavault-Sainte-Anne (French pronunciation: [lavo sɛ̃t an]; Auvergnat: La Vau de Senta Anna) is a commune in the Allier department in central France.

== Population ==
Historical population
Year	Pop.	±% p.a.
1968	570	—
1975	1,000	+8.36%
1982	1,111	+1.52%
1990	1,131	+0.22%
1999	1,158	+0.26%
2007	1,184	+0.28%
2012	1,129	−0.95%
2017	1,165	+0.63%
2023	1,139	−0.38%
Source: INSEE

== See also ==
- Communes of the Allier department
