= La Celle, Allier =

La Celle
- Commune
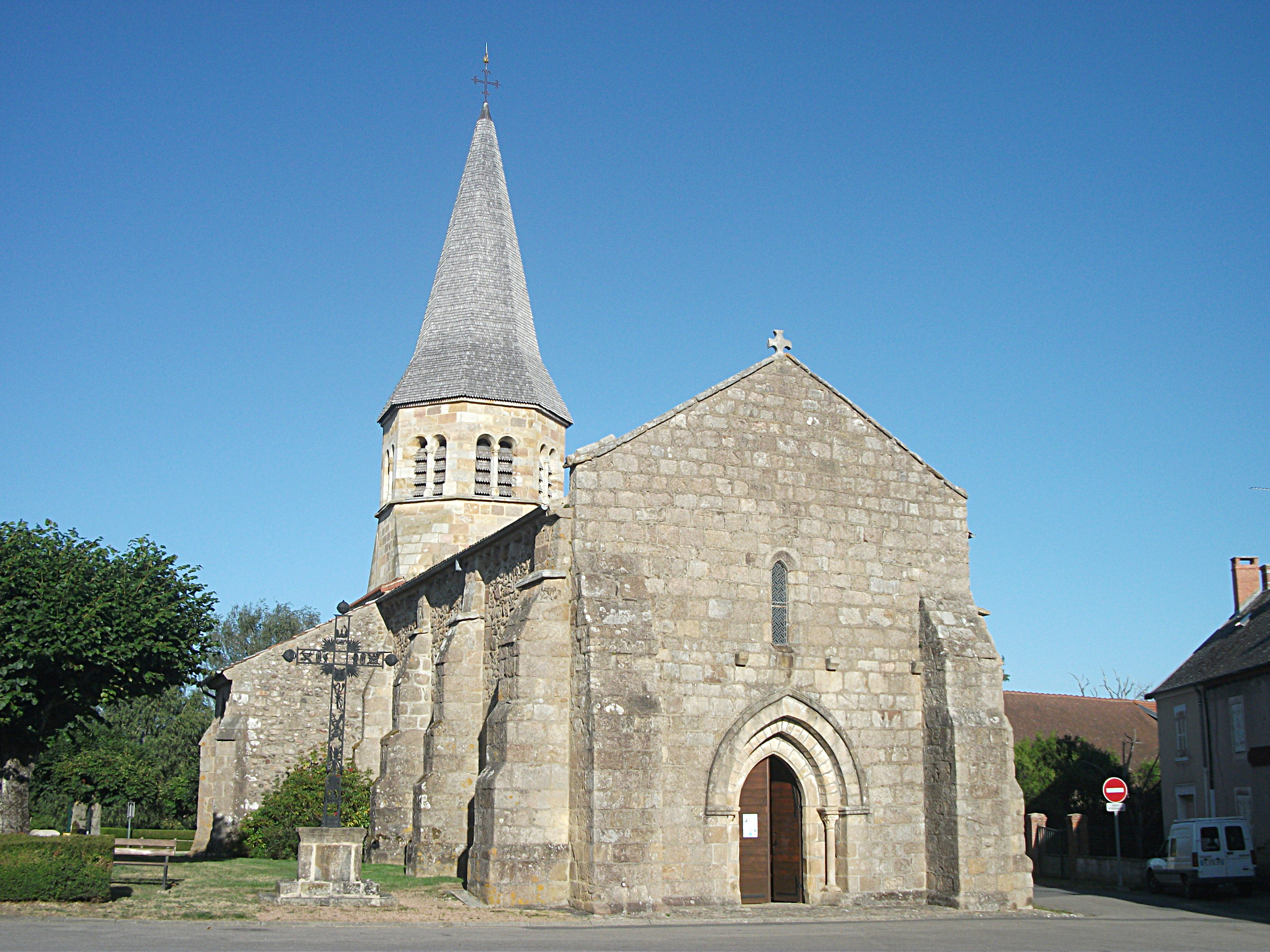
- Church St. Patrocle
- Location of La Celle
- Location within France Location within Auvergne-Rhône-Alpes
- Coordinates: 46°13′46″N 2°47′08″E
- Country: France
- Region: Auvergne-Rhône-Alpes
- Department: Allier
- Arrondissement: Montluçon
- Canton: Montluçon-3
- Intercommunality: Commentry Montmarault Néris Communauté

Government
  - Mayor (2026–32): Anthony Lintignat
- Area^{1}: 31.2 km^{2} (12.0 sq mi)
- Elevation: 500 m (1,600 ft)
- Highest elevation: 645 m (2,116 ft)
- Lowest elevation: 390 m (1,280 ft)
- Population (2023): 398
  - Density: 12.8/km^{2} (33.0/sq mi)
- Time zone: UTC+01:00 (CET)
  - Summer (DST): UTC+02:00 (CEST)
- INSEE/Postal code: 03047 /03600
- ^{1} French Land Register data, which excludes lakes, ponds, glaciers > 1 km^{2} (0.386 sq mi or 247 acres) and river estuaries.

La Celle (French pronunciation: [la sɛl]; Occitan: La Cela) is a commune in the Allier department in central France.

== Population ==
Historical population
Year	Pop.	±% p.a.
1968	507	—
1975	450	−1.69%
1982	436	−0.45%
1990	405	−0.92%
1999	407	+0.05%
2007	414	+0.21%
2012	422	+0.38%
2017	413	−0.43%
2023	398	−0.61%
Source: INSEE

== See also ==
- Communes of the Allier department
