= Durdat-Larequille =

- Commune
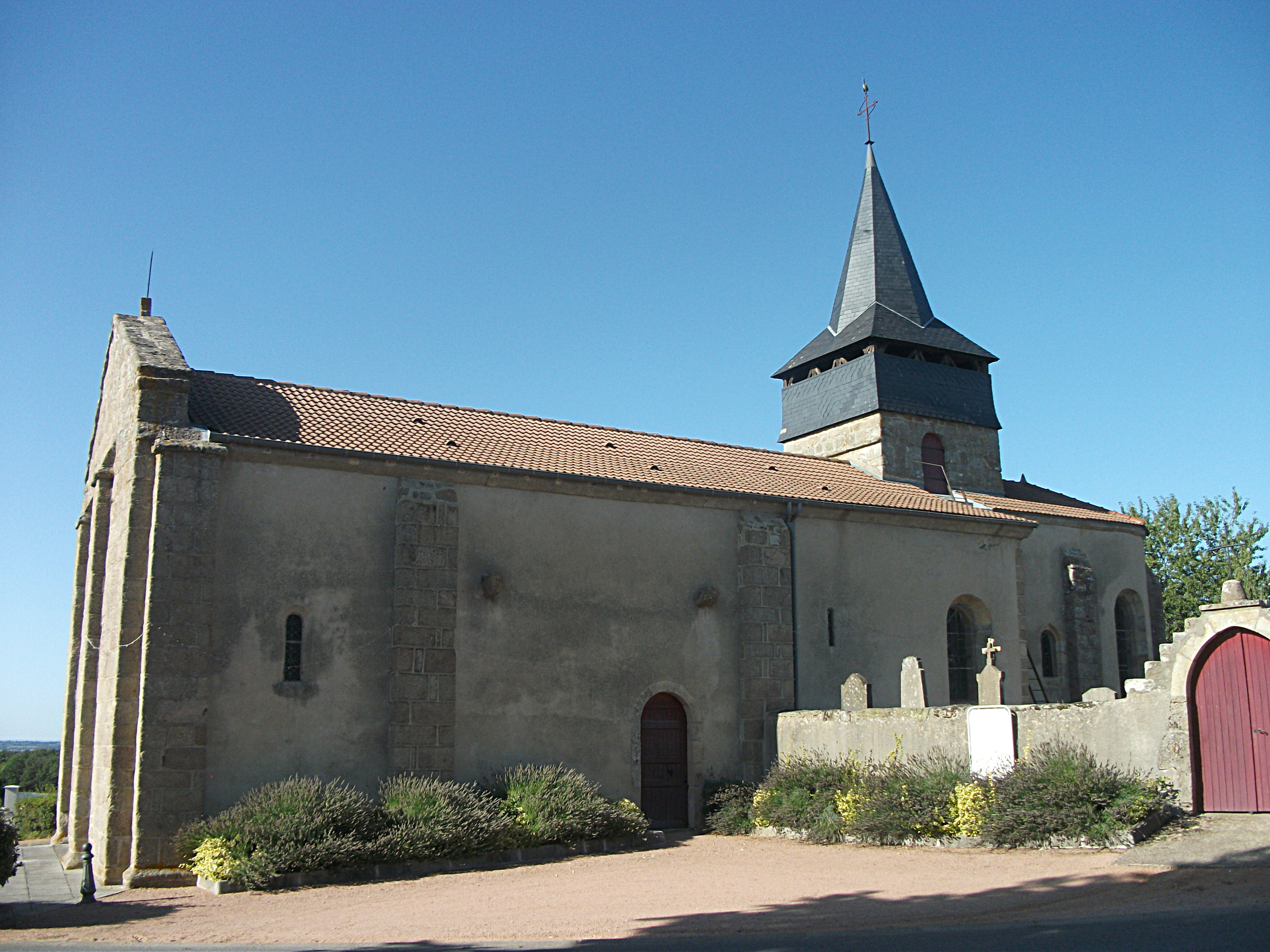
- Church in Durdat hamlet
- Location of Durdat-Larequille
- Location within France Location within Auvergne-Rhône-Alpes
- Coordinates: 46°15′10″N 2°42′09″E
- Country: France
- Region: Auvergne-Rhône-Alpes
- Department: Allier
- Arrondissement: Montluçon
- Canton: Montluçon-3
- Intercommunality: Commentry Montmarault Néris Communauté

Government
  - Mayor (2026–32): Bruno Bove
- Area^{1}: 24.45 km^{2} (9.44 sq mi)
- Elevation: 500 m (1,600 ft)
- Highest elevation: 534 m (1,752 ft)
- Lowest elevation: 370 m (1,210 ft)
- Population (2023): 1,280
  - Density: 52.4/km^{2} (136/sq mi)
- Time zone: UTC+01:00 (CET)
  - Summer (DST): UTC+02:00 (CEST)
- INSEE/Postal code: 03106 /03310
- ^{1} French Land Register data, which excludes lakes, ponds, glaciers > 1 km^{2} (0.386 sq mi or 247 acres) and river estuaries.

Durdat-Larequille (French pronunciation: [dyʁda laʁ(ə)kij]; Occitan: Durdat e La Requilha) is a commune in the Allier department in central France.

The commune was the birthplace of Christophe Thivrier, a miner who became the first Socialist mayor in France and then was a Deputy in the National Assembly.

== Population ==
Historical population
Year	Pop.	±% p.a.
1968	1,089	—
1975	1,012	−1.04%
1982	1,089	+1.05%
1990	1,139	+0.56%
1999	1,109	−0.30%
2007	1,231	+1.31%
2012	1,291	+0.96%
2017	1,328	+0.57%
2023	1,280	−0.61%
Source: INSEE

== See also ==
- Communes of the Allier department
