= Teillet-Argenty =

- Commune
- Location of Teillet-Argenty
- Location within France Location within Auvergne-Rhône-Alpes
- Coordinates: 46°15′37″N 2°30′46″E
- Country: France
- Region: Auvergne-Rhône-Alpes
- Department: Allier
- Arrondissement: Montluçon
- Canton: Montluçon-4
- Intercommunality: CA Montluçon Communauté

Government
  - Mayor (2026–32): Marilyne Bellynck
- Area^{1}: 21.99 km^{2} (8.49 sq mi)
- Elevation: 379 m (1,243 ft)
- Highest elevation: 432 m (1,417 ft)
- Lowest elevation: 238 m (781 ft)
- Population (2023): 555
  - Density: 25.2/km^{2} (65.4/sq mi)
- Time zone: UTC+01:00 (CET)
  - Summer (DST): UTC+02:00 (CEST)
- INSEE/Postal code: 03279 /03410
- ^{1} French Land Register data, which excludes lakes, ponds, glaciers > 1 km^{2} (0.386 sq mi or 247 acres) and river estuaries.

Teillet-Argenty (French pronunciation: [tɛjɛ aʁʒɑ̃ti]; Occitan: Telhet e Argentier) is a commune in the Allier department in Auvergne-Rhône-Alpes in central France.

== Population ==
Historical population
| Year | Pop. | ±% p.a. |
|---|---|---|
| 1968 | 528 | — |
| 1975 | 458 | −2.01% |
| 1982 | 448 | −0.31% |
| 1990 | 474 | +0.71% |
| 1999 | 472 | −0.05% |
| 2007 | 515 | +1.10% |
| 2012 | 565 | +1.87% |
| 2017 | 556 | −0.32% |
| 2023 | 555 | −0.03% |
Source: INSEE

== See also ==
- Communes of the Allier department
