= Néris-les-Bains =

- Commune
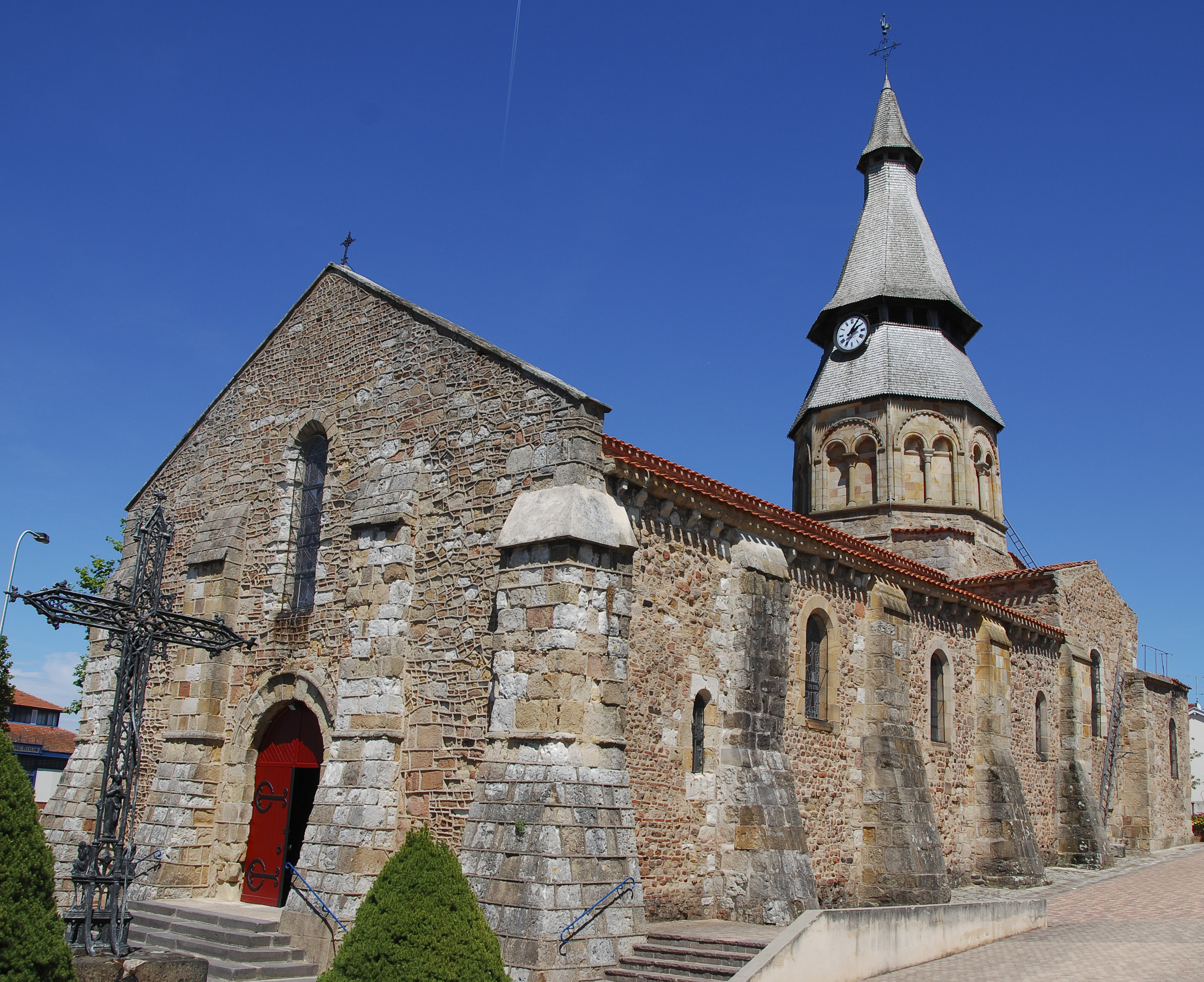
- The church in Néris-les-Bains

- Coat of arms
- Location of Néris-les-Bains
- Location within France Location within Auvergne-Rhône-Alpes
- Coordinates: 46°17′19″N 2°39′44″E
- Country: France
- Region: Auvergne-Rhône-Alpes
- Department: Allier
- Arrondissement: Montluçon
- Canton: Montluçon-3

Government
  - Mayor (2026–2032): Ludovic Ruaux
- Area^{1}: 33.13 km^{2} (12.79 sq mi)
- Elevation: 360 m (1,180 ft)
- Highest elevation: 441 m (1,447 ft)
- Lowest elevation: 230 m (750 ft)
- Population (2023): 2,368
  - Density: 71.48/km^{2} (185.1/sq mi)
- Time zone: UTC+01:00 (CET)
  - Summer (DST): UTC+02:00 (CEST)
- INSEE/Postal code: 03195 /03310
- ^{1} French Land Register data, which excludes lakes, ponds, glaciers > 1 km^{2} (0.386 sq mi or 247 acres) and river estuaries.

Néris-les-Bains (French pronunciation: [neʁi le bɛ̃]; Occitan: Nerís) is a commune in the Allier department in the Auvergne-Rhône-Alpes region in central France.

== Etymology ==
The name Néris comes from the Gaul God Nérios, a deity personifying the local thermal spring (Latinized to "Nerius").

== Geography ==
8 kilometers southeast of Montluçon, the town is on departmental road 2144, which links Clermont-Ferrand to Bourges via Montluçon, and follows the trail of the ancient Roman way.

The town is at 352 meters of altitude, on the first foothills of the Massif central, more precisely the plateau of the Combrailles.

== History ==
=== The Gaul era: Nériomagos ===
At that time, Néris was called Nériomagos (the town of Nérios, the deity personifying the thermal spring). It was a village with a booming trade, at the crossroads of two major ways.

=== The Roman colonisation: Aquae Nerii ===
"Nérios" was Latinized into "Nérius", and "Nériomagos" became "Aquae Nerii" ("Nérius' waters"). The spring was used for therapeutic purposes and two luxurious thermal baths were created. Numerous monuments were built, including temples and villas. The 8th legion Augusta stationed there at the end of the 1st century. A circle theater (amphitheater) was built to offer circus games and stage performances to the soldiers and inhabitants. Many relics remain from that golden age.

=== Germanic invasions and Merovingian era ===
Around 275 C.E., the Germanic invasions destroyed a part of the town and the population fled, leaving behind monetary treasures.

In the 4th century, the thermal baths and the houses were partly rearranged and occupied again.

A new wave of invasions destroyed the town again, and the ruins were then used as a gravel-pit by the Merovingian population. Stone blocks belonging to the public buildings were thus used for the sarcophaguses now located under the glass pyramid on the church square.

=== Evangelism and Carolingian era ===
Saint Patrocle evangelized Néris in the 6th century and built a church and a convent there. The current romanesque church dates back to the 11th or 12th century and was built in the same place as the original 6th-century basilica, which was erected upon the ruins of a Roman building.

The Carolingian king Pépin the First of Aquitaine, Charlemagne's grandson, stayed in Néris in 835 and 838.

=== The 16th century ===
Néris' thermal baths' fame increased. Rabelais mentioned them in Pantagruel (which is why Néris' middle school is called Collège François Rabelais), and Nicolas de Nicolay, King Charles the Ninth of France' geographer, cited the "Baings de Nérys" in 1569 (modern orthograph: Bains de Néris = Baths of Néris).

=== The 19th century ===
Néris' new golden age began when the Dauphine, Duchess of Angoulême, lay the foundation stone of the new thermal resort. The hotels, the casino and the theater were built.

Among the famous people who followed a thermal course of treatment in Néri were Chateaubriand, Musset, Lamartine and the empress Eugénie.

At that time, archaeological excavations began to discover the Roman Aquae Nerii's infrastructure.

Society life was in full swing, and grand parties were organized.

=== The 20th century ===
Néris became a "hospital town" during the first World War, where injured soldiers were taken care of.

By the end of the war, the thermal baths were prosperous again. In 1930, the railroad line between Néris and Montluçon entered service, as did the train station in Néris, with its pink sandstone and its multicolored roof, designed by Louis Brachet. The bourgeoisie and the politic class used the thermal baths, including the Poincaré family, and Léon Blum.

The second World War and the social progress that preceded it (Social Security and paid vacation) gave the town a new look and a new clientele.

The thermal baths were modernized and the town equipped itself with golf, an archaeological museum and a swimming pool. Néris started opening up to health tourism and emphasizing its heritage.

== Population ==
The inhabitants of Néris-les-Bains are called Nérisiens. The 18th-century French economist Joachim Faiguet de Villeneuve (1703–1781) died in Néris-les-Bains.

Historical population
Year	Pop.	±% p.a.
1968	2,917	—
1975	2,836	−0.40%
1982	2,924	+0.44%
1990	2,831	−0.40%
1999	2,708	−0.49%
2007	2,728	+0.09%
2012	2,588	−1.05%
2017	2,553	−0.27%
2023	2,368	−1.25%
Source: INSEE

== Sights ==
- The Saint Georges Church (11th and 12th centuries)
- The Merovingian necropolis
- The City Hall (19th century)
- The former train station, by architect Louis Brachet
- Saint Joseph's Chapel (19th century)
- The spa and theater
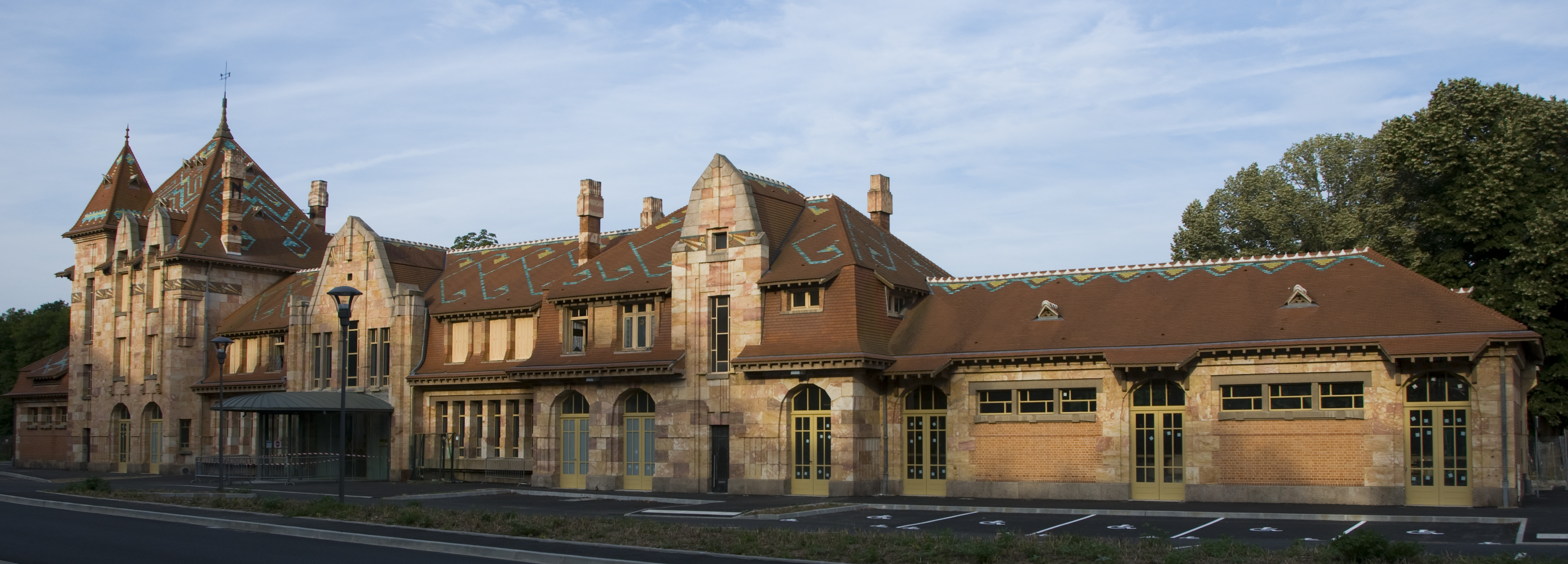
The former train station

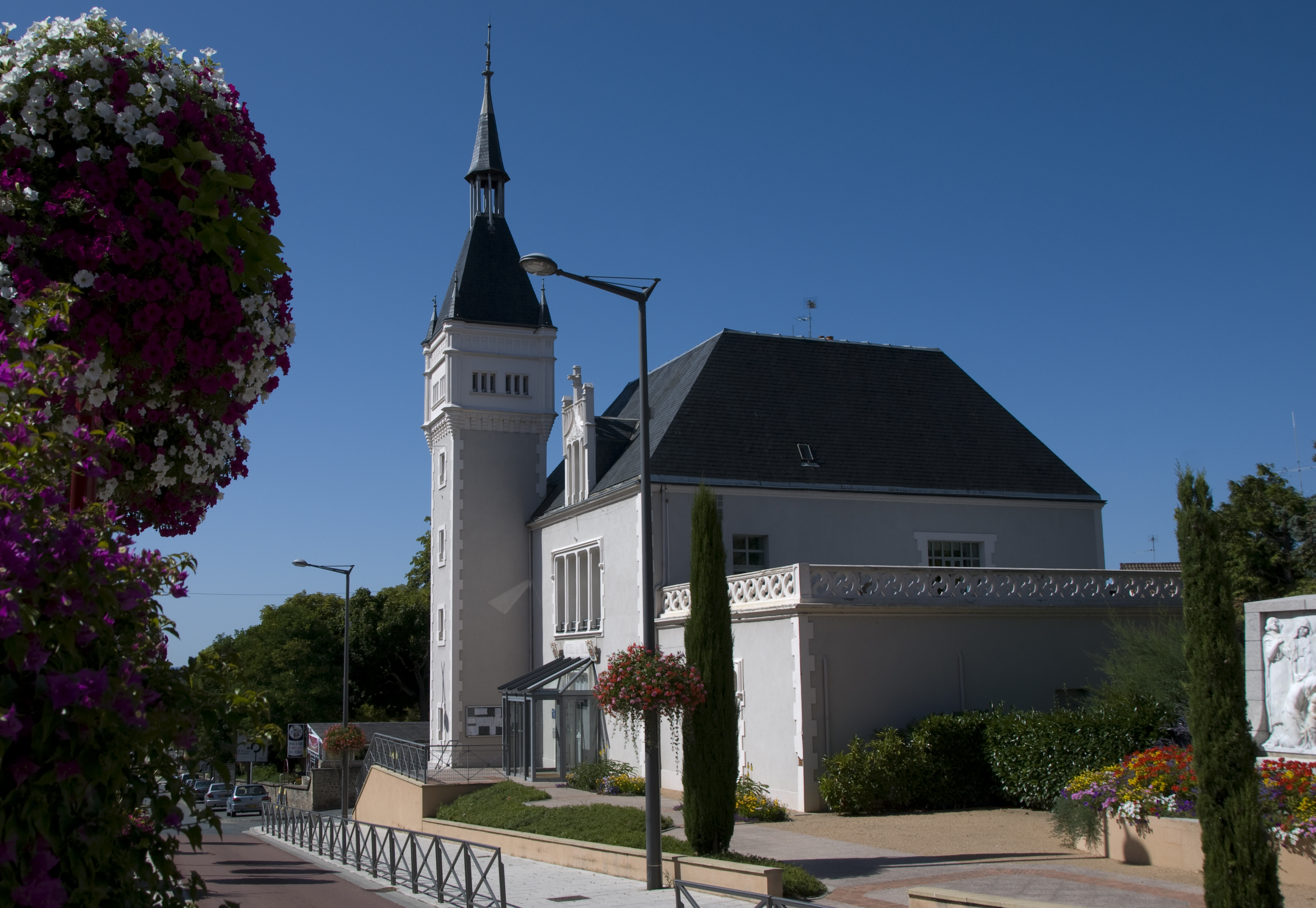
The City Hall

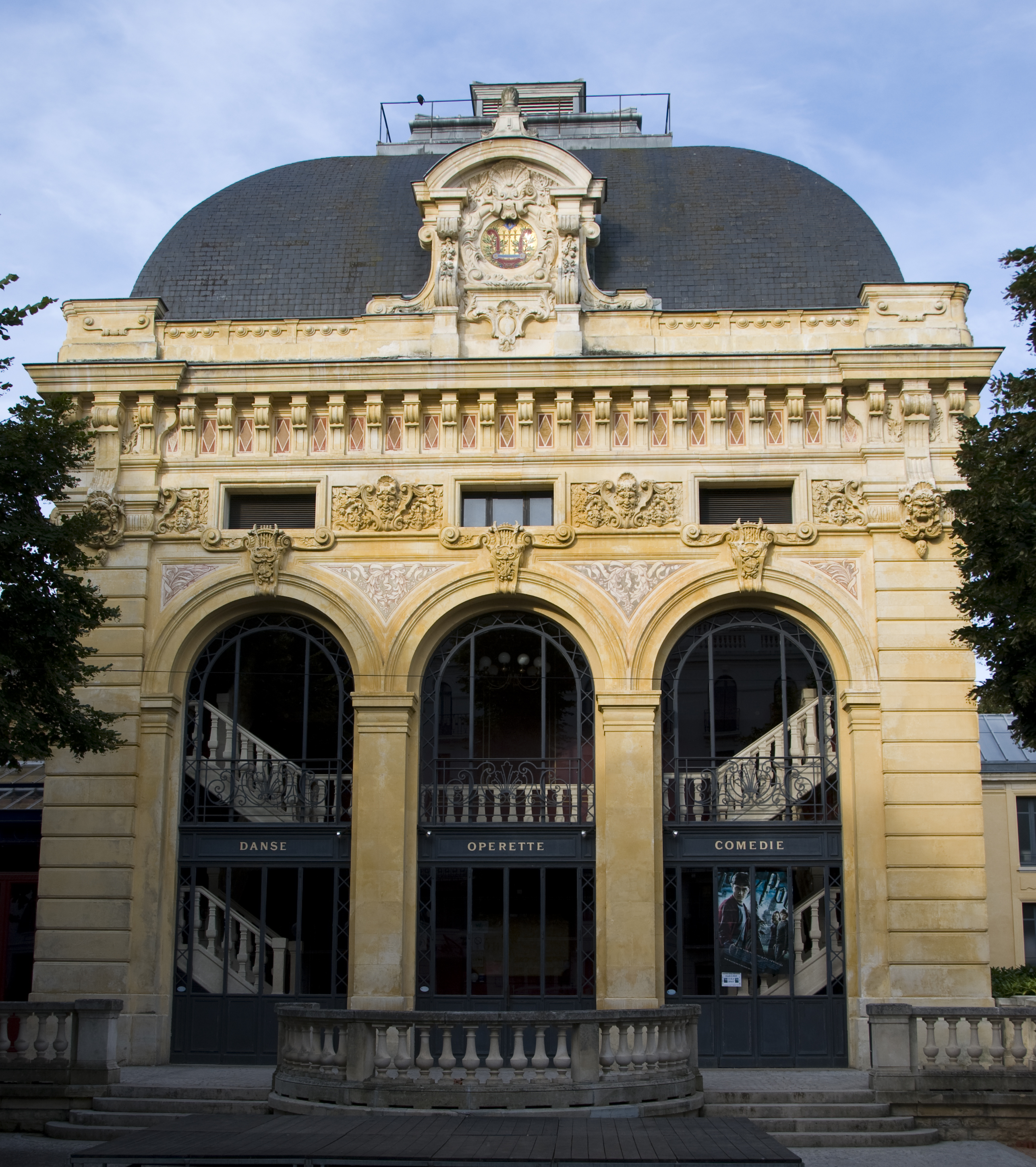
The Municipal Theater

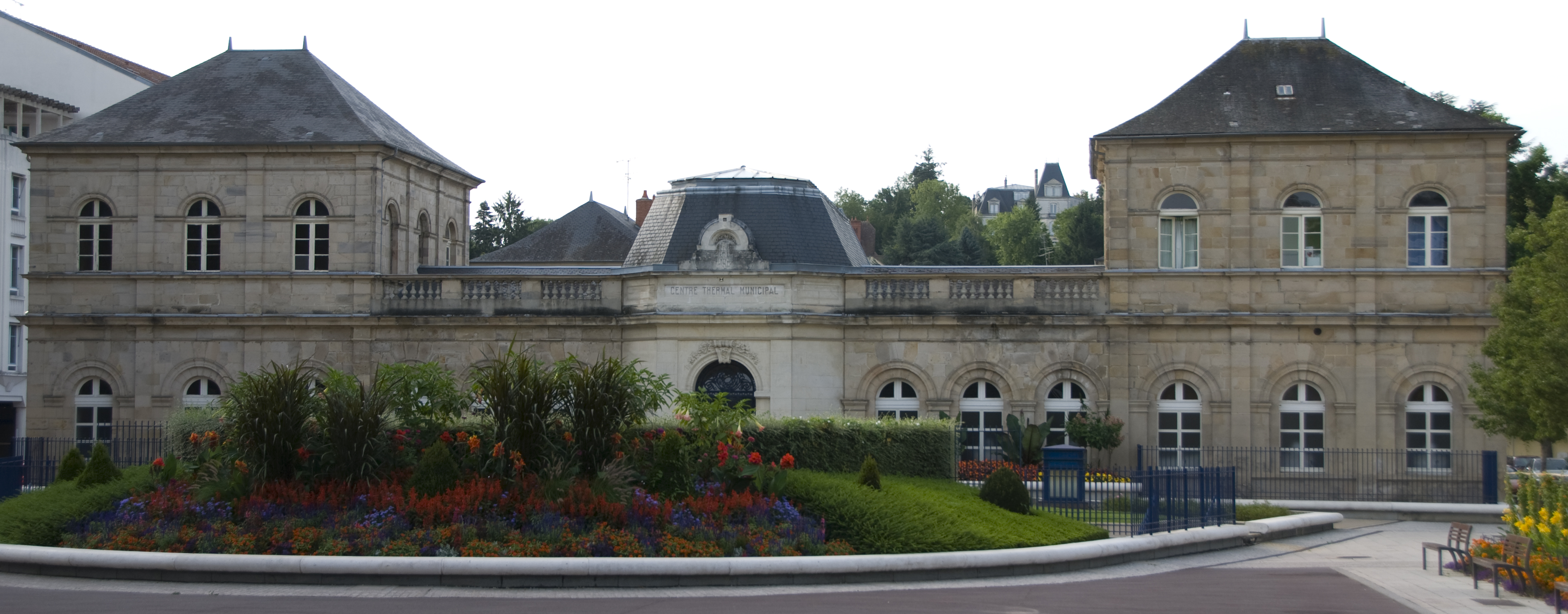
The spa

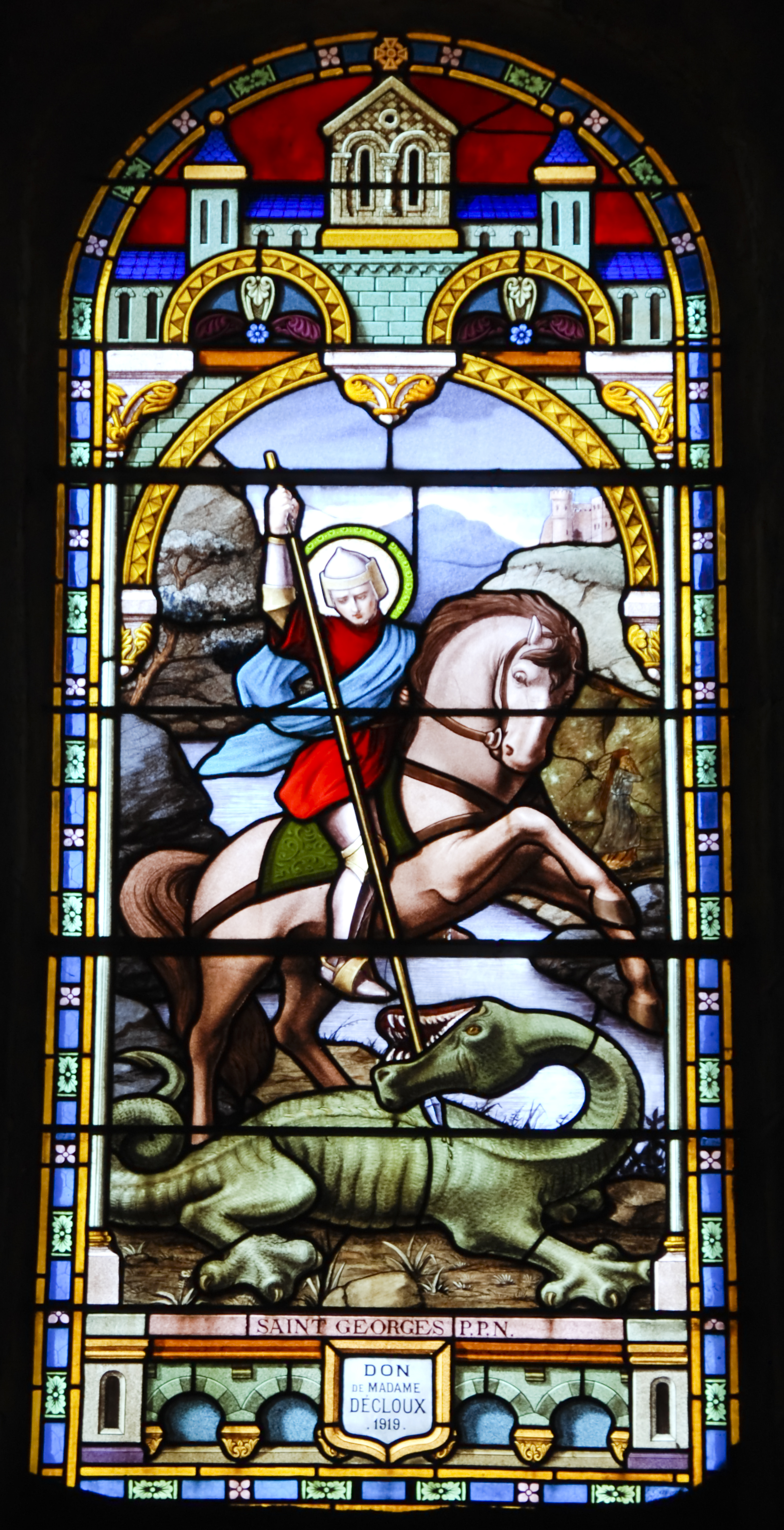
Stained glass of the Saint Georges church

== See also ==
- Communes of the Allier department
