= Prémilhat =

- Commune
- Coat of arms
- Location of Prémilhat
- Location within France Location within Auvergne-Rhône-Alpes
- Coordinates: 46°18′51″N 2°32′11″E
- Country: France
- Region: Auvergne-Rhône-Alpes
- Department: Allier
- Arrondissement: Montluçon
- Canton: Montluçon-4
- Intercommunality: CA Montluçon Communauté

Government
  - Mayor (2026–32): Bernard Pozzoli
- Area^{1}: 21.12 km^{2} (8.15 sq mi)
- Elevation: 300 m (980 ft)
- Highest elevation: 426 m (1,398 ft)
- Lowest elevation: 217 m (712 ft)
- Population (2023): 2,540
  - Density: 120/km^{2} (311/sq mi)
- Time zone: UTC+01:00 (CET)
  - Summer (DST): UTC+02:00 (CEST)
- INSEE/Postal code: 03211 /03410
- ^{1} French Land Register data, which excludes lakes, ponds, glaciers > 1 km^{2} (0.386 sq mi or 247 acres) and river estuaries.

Prémilhat (French pronunciation: [pʁemija]; Occitan: Premilhac) is a commune in the Allier department in Auvergne in central France. It is around 5 km south-west of Montluçon.

== Population ==
Historical population
Year	Pop.	±% p.a.
1968	1,172	—
1975	1,741	+5.82%
1982	2,162	+3.14%
1990	2,051	−0.66%
1999	1,995	−0.31%
2007	2,195	+1.20%
2012	2,383	+1.66%
2017	2,458	+0.62%
2023	2,540	+0.55%
Source: INSEE

== International relations ==
Prémilhat is twinned with the Irish town of Templemore.

== See also ==
- Communes of the Allier department
