= Lignerolles, Allier =

Lignerolles
- Commune
- Coat of arms
- Location of Lignerolles
- Location within France Location within Auvergne-Rhône-Alpes
- Coordinates: 46°16′51″N 2°34′03″E
- Country: France
- Region: Auvergne-Rhône-Alpes
- Department: Allier
- Arrondissement: Montluçon
- Canton: Montluçon-4
- Intercommunality: CA Montluçon Communauté

Government
  - Mayor (2026–32): Thierry Penthier
- Area^{1}: 11.81 km^{2} (4.56 sq mi)
- Elevation: 370 m (1,210 ft)
- Highest elevation: 396 m (1,299 ft)
- Lowest elevation: 204 m (669 ft)
- Population (2023): 760
  - Density: 64/km^{2} (170/sq mi)
- Demonym(s): Lignerollais, Lignerollaises
- Time zone: UTC+01:00 (CET)
  - Summer (DST): UTC+02:00 (CEST)
- INSEE/Postal code: 03145 /03410
- ^{1} French Land Register data, which excludes lakes, ponds, glaciers > 1 km^{2} (0.386 sq mi or 247 acres) and river estuaries.

Lignerolles (French pronunciation: [liɲʁɔl]; Occitan: Linharolas) is a commune in the Allier department in central France.

== Population ==
Historical population
Year	Pop.	±% p.a.
1968	435	—
1975	443	+0.26%
1982	473	+0.94%
1990	579	+2.56%
1999	566	−0.25%
2007	621	+1.17%
2012	760	+4.12%
2017	742	−0.48%
2023	760	+0.40%
Source: INSEE

== See also ==
- Communes of the Allier department
