= Ronnet =

- Commune
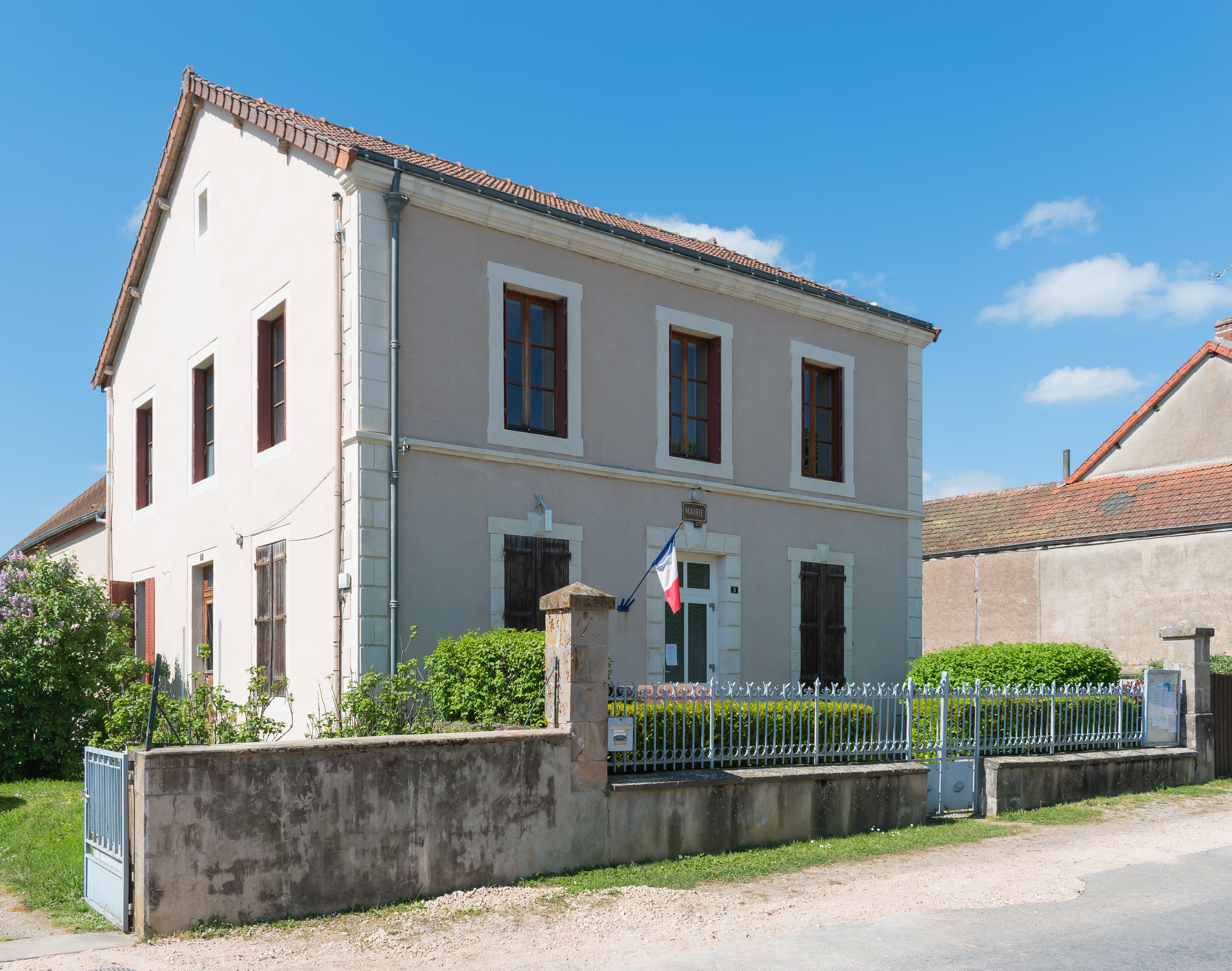
- Town hall of Ronnet

- Coat of arms
- Location of Ronnet
- Location within France Location within Auvergne-Rhône-Alpes
- Coordinates: 46°12′21″N 2°42′02″E
- Country: France
- Region: Auvergne-Rhône-Alpes
- Department: Allier
- Arrondissement: Montluçon
- Canton: Montluçon-3
- Intercommunality: CA Montluçon Communauté

Government
  - Mayor (2026–32): Pierre-Antoine Siramy
- Area^{1}: 19.88 km^{2} (7.68 sq mi)
- Elevation: 500 m (1,600 ft)
- Highest elevation: 565 m (1,854 ft)
- Lowest elevation: 456 m (1,496 ft)
- Population (2023): 162
  - Density: 8.15/km^{2} (21.1/sq mi)
- Time zone: UTC+01:00 (CET)
  - Summer (DST): UTC+02:00 (CEST)
- INSEE/Postal code: 03216 /03420
- ^{1} French Land Register data, which excludes lakes, ponds, glaciers > 1 km^{2} (0.386 sq mi or 247 acres) and river estuaries.

Ronnet (French pronunciation: [ʁɔnɛ]) is a commune in the Allier department in Auvergne in central France.

== Population ==
Historical population
Year	Pop.	±% p.a.
1968	242	—
1975	200	−2.69%
1982	164	−2.80%
1990	159	−0.39%
1999	177	+1.20%
2007	189	+0.82%
2012	179	−1.08%
2017	174	−0.57%
2023	162	−1.18%
Source: INSEE

== See also ==
- Communes of the Allier department
