= Marcillat-en-Combraille =

- Commune
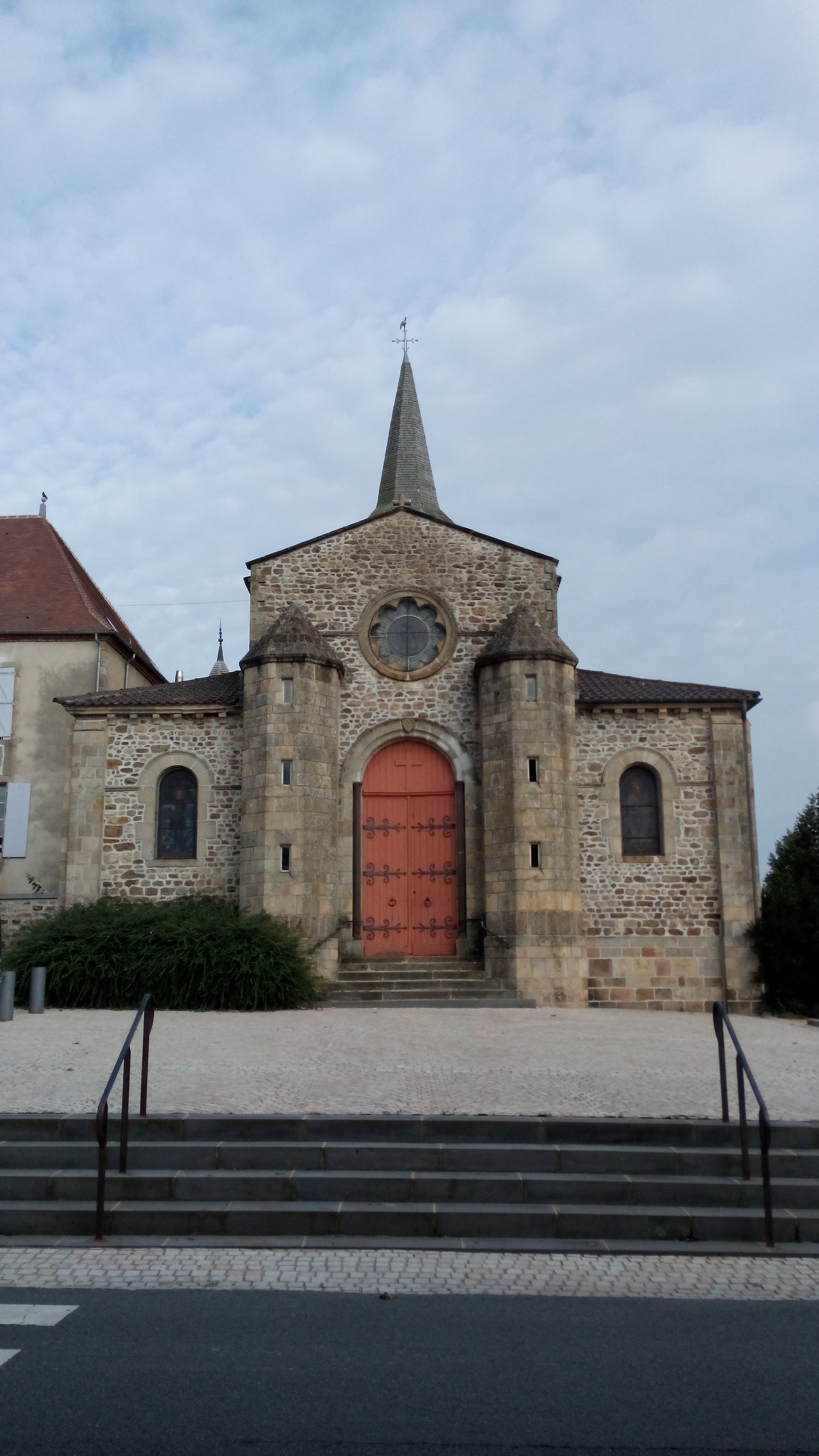
- The church in Marcillat-en-Combraille

- Coat of arms
- Location of Marcillat-en-Combraille
- Location within France Location within Auvergne-Rhône-Alpes
- Coordinates: 46°10′04″N 2°38′03″E
- Country: France
- Region: Auvergne-Rhône-Alpes
- Department: Allier
- Arrondissement: Montluçon
- Canton: Montluçon-3
- Intercommunality: CA Montluçon Communauté

Government
  - Mayor (2026–32): Stéphane Mitaty
- Area^{1}: 35.21 km^{2} (13.59 sq mi)
- Elevation: 495 m (1,624 ft)
- Highest elevation: 535 m (1,755 ft)
- Lowest elevation: 347 m (1,138 ft)
- Population (2023): 900
  - Density: 26/km^{2} (66/sq mi)
- Time zone: UTC+01:00 (CET)
  - Summer (DST): UTC+02:00 (CEST)
- INSEE/Postal code: 03161 /03420
- ^{1} French Land Register data, which excludes lakes, ponds, glaciers > 1 km^{2} (0.386 sq mi or 247 acres) and river estuaries.

Marcillat-en-Combraille (French pronunciation: [maʁsija ɑ̃ kɔ̃bʁaj]; Occitan: Marcilhac) is a commune in the Allier department in central France.

== Population ==
Historical population
Year	Pop.	±% p.a.
1968	1,147	—
1975	1,011	−1.79%
1982	976	−0.50%
1990	866	−1.48%
1999	912	+0.58%
2007	907	−0.07%
2012	897	−0.22%
2017	905	+0.18%
2023	900	−0.09%
Source: INSEE

== See also ==
- Communes of the Allier department
