= Lamaids =

- Commune
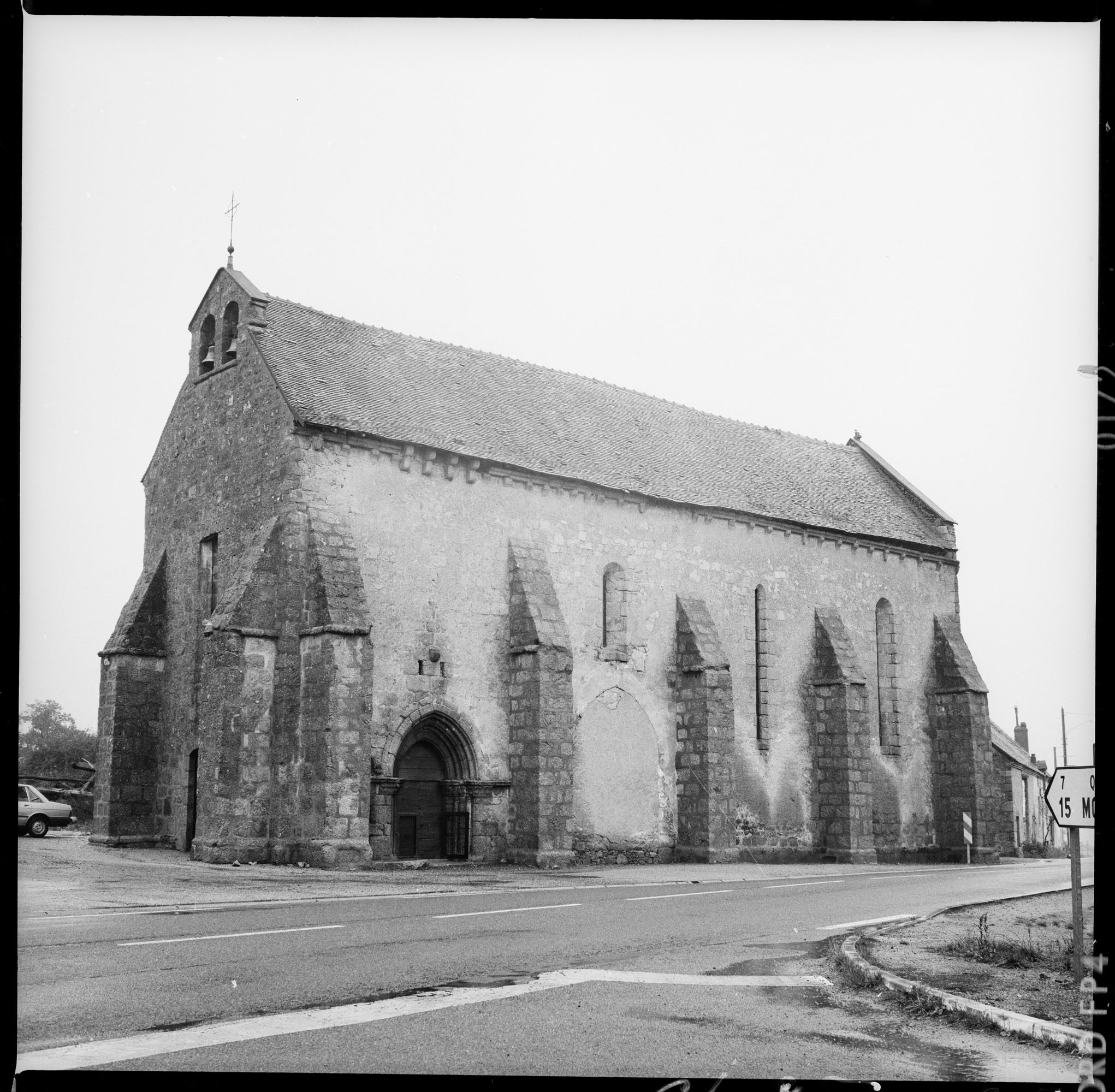
- Saint-Jean-Baptiste church, Lamaids

- Coat of arms
- Location of Lamaids
- Location within France Location within Auvergne-Rhône-Alpes
- Coordinates: 46°18′11″N 2°25′57″E
- Country: France
- Region: Auvergne-Rhône-Alpes
- Department: Allier
- Arrondissement: Montluçon
- Canton: Montluçon-4
- Intercommunality: CA Montluçon Communauté

Government
  - Mayor (2026–32): Fabien Thavenot
- Area^{1}: 8.02 km^{2} (3.10 sq mi)
- Elevation: 499 m (1,637 ft)
- Highest elevation: 505 m (1,657 ft)
- Lowest elevation: 399 m (1,309 ft)
- Population (2023): 210
  - Density: 26/km^{2} (68/sq mi)
- Time zone: UTC+01:00 (CET)
  - Summer (DST): UTC+02:00 (CEST)
- INSEE/Postal code: 03136 /03380
- ^{1} French Land Register data, which excludes lakes, ponds, glaciers > 1 km^{2} (0.386 sq mi or 247 acres) and river estuaries.

Lamaids (French pronunciation: [lamɛ]) is a commune in the Allier department in central France.

== Population ==
Historical population
Year	Pop.	±% p.a.
1968	184	—
1975	166	−1.46%
1982	145	−1.91%
1990	134	−0.98%
1999	136	+0.16%
2007	142	+0.54%
2012	194	+6.44%
2017	222	+2.73%
2023	210	−0.92%
Source: INSEE

== See also ==
- Communes of the Allier department
