= Vichy =

City in central France

Vichy Vichèi (Occitan)
- Subprefecture and commune
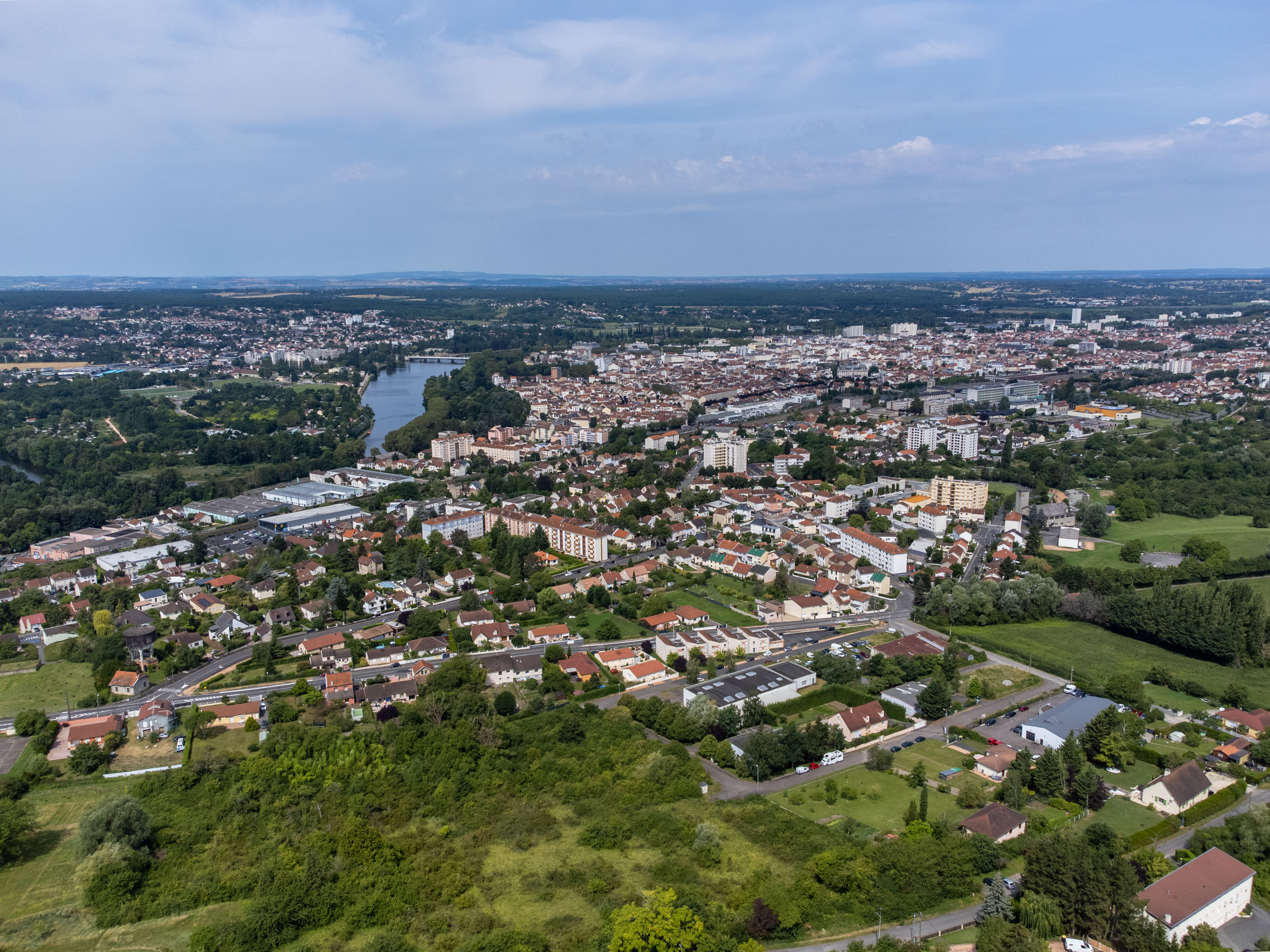
- Aerial view of Vichy in 2023.

- Coat of arms

- Location of Vichy
- Location within France Location within Auvergne-Rhône-Alpes
- Coordinates: 46°07′40″N 3°25′36″E
- Country: France
- Region: Auvergne-Rhône-Alpes
- Department: Allier
- Arrondissement: Vichy
- Canton: Vichy-1 and Vichy-2
- Intercommunality: CA Vichy Communauté

Government
  - Mayor (2026–32): Frédéric Aguilera
- Area^{1}: 5.85 km^{2} (2.26 sq mi)
- Elevation: 263 m (863 ft)
- Highest elevation: 317 m (1,040 ft)
- Lowest elevation: 243 m (797 ft)
- Population (2023): 25,115
  - Density: 4,290/km^{2} (11,100/sq mi)
- Time zone: UTC+01:00 (CET)
  - Summer (DST): UTC+02:00 (CEST)
- INSEE/Postal code: 03310 /03200
- Website: ville-vichy.fr

UNESCO World Heritage Site
- Part of: The Great Spa Towns of Europe
- Criteria: Cultural: (ii)(iii)
- Reference: 1613
- Inscription: 2021 (44th Session)
- ^{1} French Land Register data, which excludes lakes, ponds, glaciers > 1 km^{2} (0.386 sq mi or 247 acres) and river estuaries.

Vichy (/ˈvɪʃi, ˈviːʃi/, French: [viʃi]; Occitan: Vichèi [viˈtʃɛj]) is a city in the central French department of Allier. Located on the Allier river, it is a major spa and resort town and during World War II was the de facto administrative capital of Vichy France. Its population is about 25,000.

Known for its mineral springs since the Roman times, Vichy had become a major destination for the French nobility and the wealthy by the late 18th century. The town developed further under the patronage of Napoleon III. Following the 1940 armistice, the pro-German collaborationist government headed by Philippe Pétain was set up at Vichy, which remained the de facto capital of the French rump state for the next four years. After the war, the city experienced a period of great prosperity but went into decline from the 1960s.

In 2021, the town became part of the transnational UNESCO World Heritage Site under the name "Great Spa Towns of Europe" because of its famous baths and its architectural testimony to the popularity of spa towns in Europe from the 18th through 20th centuries.

== Name ==
Vichy is the French form of the Occitan name of the town, Vichèi, of uncertain etymology. Dauzat & al. have proposed that it derived from an unattested Latin name (Vippiacus) referencing the most important regional landowner (presumably a "Vippius") during the time of the Roman emperor Diocletian's administrative reorganizations and land surveys at the end of the 3rd century AD.

The name Vichy may be pronounced /ˈvɪʃi/ or /ˈviːʃi/ in either American or British English; its usual French pronunciation is [viʃi]. The pronunciation of the Occitan name Vichèi is [viˈʃe].

In French, the present-day demonym for a female resident or native of Vichy is Vichyssoise, f sg (Vichyssoises, f pl) and Vichyssois, m sg for a male, and Vichyssois m pl for a mixed group of both sexes. Until the 18th century, it was also common to use Vichois(e), which derived from the Occitan name of the town. The cold soup vichyssoise is also named after the town.

== Geography and geology ==
Vichy lies on the banks of the river Allier. The source of the Allier is in the nearby Massif Central plateau which lies only a few miles to the south, near the region's capital, Clermont-Ferrand.

The historical existence of volcanic activity in the Massif Central is somewhat visually evident. Volcanic eruptions have happened for at least 150,000 years, but all volcanoes there have been dormant for at least 112 years. Volcanic activity in the area is the direct cause of the many thermal springs that exist in and around Vichy.

The famous mineral springs in Vichy are rich in trace elements such as lithium and fluorine, and high in sodium bicarbonate. The temperatures of the spring range from 21 °C (70 °F) at Antoine Spring to 14 °C (57 °F) at Lafayette Spring. In total, about 289 springs have been charted in Vichy and its surroundings. These springs are derived from infiltration through Oligocene-period sedimentary rocks, part of the Limagne Graben collapse basin.

=== Climate ===
Vichy enjoys an oceanic climate (Cfb). Heavy snows in the Massif Central often make roads impassable, but Vichy is low enough—about 249 metres (817 feet) above sea level—that the climate is more continental than mountain. Rainfall is moderate around Vichy, averaging about 769.1 mm (30.3 in) annually.

Comparison of local Meteorological data with other cities in France
Town	Sunshine (hours/yr)	Rain (mm/yr)	Snow (days/yr)	Storm (days/yr)	Fog (days/yr)
National average	1,973	770	14	22	40
Vichy	1,862	779.5	17.5	25.9	34.6
Paris	1,661	637	12	18	10
Nice	2,724	767	1	29	1
Strasbourg	1,693	665	29	29	56
Brest	1,605	1,211	7	12	75

Climate data for Vichy – Charmeil (VHY), elevation: 249 m (817 ft) (1991–2020 normals, extremes 1941–present)
Month	Jan	Feb	Mar	Apr	May	Jun	Jul	Aug	Sep	Oct	Nov	Dec	Year
Record high °C (°F)	19.2 (66.6)	25.7 (78.3)	27.0 (80.6)	30.8 (87.4)	33.8 (92.8)	41.7 (107.1)	41.2 (106.2)	40.6 (105.1)	36.4 (97.5)	31.1 (88.0)	26.2 (79.2)	21.7 (71.1)	41.2 (106.2)
Mean daily maximum °C (°F)	7.9 (46.2)	9.3 (48.7)	13.6 (56.5)	16.7 (62.1)	20.6 (69.1)	24.5 (76.1)	26.8 (80.2)	26.9 (80.4)	22.5 (72.5)	17.8 (64.0)	11.9 (53.4)	8.3 (46.9)	17.2 (63.0)
Daily mean °C (°F)	4.0 (39.2)	4.6 (40.3)	7.8 (46.0)	10.5 (50.9)	14.4 (57.9)	18.1 (64.6)	20.2 (68.4)	20.1 (68.2)	16.2 (61.2)	12.6 (54.7)	7.5 (45.5)	4.6 (40.3)	11.7 (53.1)
Mean daily minimum °C (°F)	0.1 (32.2)	−0.1 (31.8)	2.0 (35.6)	4.2 (39.6)	8.2 (46.8)	11.8 (53.2)	13.6 (56.5)	13.4 (56.1)	9.8 (49.6)	7.4 (45.3)	3.2 (37.8)	0.8 (33.4)	6.2 (43.2)
Record low °C (°F)	−26.9 (−16.4)	−24.0 (−11.2)	−13.3 (8.1)	−7.3 (18.9)	−4.2 (24.4)	−0.2 (31.6)	3.7 (38.7)	1.7 (35.1)	−2.0 (28.4)	−9.0 (15.8)	−11.3 (11.7)	−18.5 (−1.3)	−26.9 (−16.4)
Average precipitation mm (inches)	48.1 (1.89)	37.5 (1.48)	43.5 (1.71)	68.5 (2.70)	88.4 (3.48)	72.7 (2.86)	75.7 (2.98)	76.1 (3.00)	68.3 (2.69)	70.2 (2.76)	70.1 (2.76)	50.0 (1.97)	769.1 (30.28)
Average precipitation days (≥ 1.0 mm)	9.9	8.7	8.8	10.3	11.6	9.0	8.4	8.6	8.5	10.3	10.6	9.9	114.6
Average snowy days	4.8	4.7	2.6	1.0	0.0	0.0	0.0	0.0	0.0	0.0	1.5	3.7	18.3
Average relative humidity (%)	84	80	75	74	77	76	73	75	78	83	84	85	78.7
Mean monthly sunshine hours	71.5	96.6	156.1	180.8	204.4	224.5	254.2	244.8	189.9	127.5	80.2	61.2	1,891.6
Source 1: Meteociel (snow days 1981-2010)
Source 2: Infoclimat.fr (humidity, 1961–1990)

== History ==
=== Roman era ===
The first known settlement at Vichy was established by Roman legionaries in 52 BC. Returning south from their defeat at the Battle of Gergovia by the Gauls under Vercingetorix, they found the hot mineral springs beside the Flumen Elaver ("River Allier") and established the township of Aquae Calidae (Latin for "Hot Waters"). During the first two centuries AD, Vichy became fairly prosperous because of the supposed medicinal value of the thermal springs.

=== Middle Ages ===
On 2 September 1344, John II of France ceded the noble fiefdom of Vichy to Peter I, Duke of Bourbon. On 6 December 1374, the last part of Vichy was acquired by Louis II, Duke of Bourbon. At that point Vichy was incorporated into the House of Bourbon. In 1410, a Celestinian monastery was founded with twelve monks. A building located above the Celestinian Spring is still visible.

In 1527, the House of Bourbon was incorporated into the French Kingdom. By the end of the 16th century, the mineral baths had obtained a reputation for having quasi-miraculous curing powers and attracted patients from the noble and wealthy classes. Government officials, such as Fouet and Chomel, began to classify the curing properties of the mineral baths.

=== Vichy's thermal baths ===
Marie de Rabutin-Chantal, marquise de Sévigné was a patient in 1676 and 1677 and would popularize Vichy's Thermal Baths through the written descriptions in her letters. The Vichy waters were said to have cured the paralysis in her hands, thus enabling her to take up letter-writing. In 1761 and 1762, Adélaïde and Victoire of France, the daughters of Louis XV, came to Vichy for the first time and returned in 1785. The bath facilities seemed extremely uncomfortable to them because of the muddy surroundings and insufficient access. When they returned to Versailles, they asked their nephew Louis XVI to build roomier and more luxurious thermal baths, which were subsequently completed in 1787.

In 1799, Laetitia Bonaparte, mother of Napoleon, came to be cured with her son Louis. Under the Empire, Le Parc des Sources, was created on the Emperor's orders (Decree of Gumbinen of 1812).

Under Charles X, the great increase in patients wishing to be healed at the springs led to an expansion of the hydrotherapeutic facilities. Princess Marie-Thérèse-Charlotte expanded the Janson buildings under the plan of Rose – Beauvais (work completed in 1830). From 1844 to 1853, theatrical and poetry recitals were performed for the wealthy in the comfort of their own homes by Isaac Strauss.

=== Vichy in style ===
By the 19th century, Vichy was a station à la mode, attended by many celebrities. However, it was the stays of Napoleon III between 1861 and 1866 that were to cause the most profound transformation of the city: dikes were built along the Allier, 13 hectares (32 acres) of landscaped gardens replaced the old marshes and, along the newly laid-out boulevards and streets, chalets and pavilions were built for the emperor and his court. Recreational pursuits were not spared: in view of the park, a large casino was built by the architect Badger in 1865. The Emperor would be the catalyst of the development of a small rail station, which increased the number of inhabitants and visitors tenfold in fifty years.

After the Second French Empire, the Belle Époque marked the second large construction campaign in Vichy. In 1903, the Opera House (l'Opéra), the Hall of Springs and a large bath designed in the eastern style were inaugurated. In 1900, the Parc des Sources was enclosed by a metal gallery which came from the World Fair of 1889. 700 metres (2,300 feet) long, it is decorated by a frise de chardons and was completed by the ironworker Emile Robert. Many private mansions with varied architectural styles were erected during the first half of the 20th century.

Vichy welcomed 40,000 curistes in 1900, and that figure had risen to nearly 100,000 just before the onset of the First World War. La vie thermale had its heyday in the 1930s. The success in treating ailments that was attributed to the Vichy Baths led la Compagnie Fermière to enlarge the Baths again by creating the Callou and Lardy Baths. The Art Nouveau-style Opéra, inaugurated in 1903, accommodated all the great names on the international scene. Vichy became the summertime music capital of France, but the war of 1914 would put a brutal end to that development. The Hôtel de Ville was officially opened in 1928.

=== World War II – Seat of the pro-German collaborationist government ===
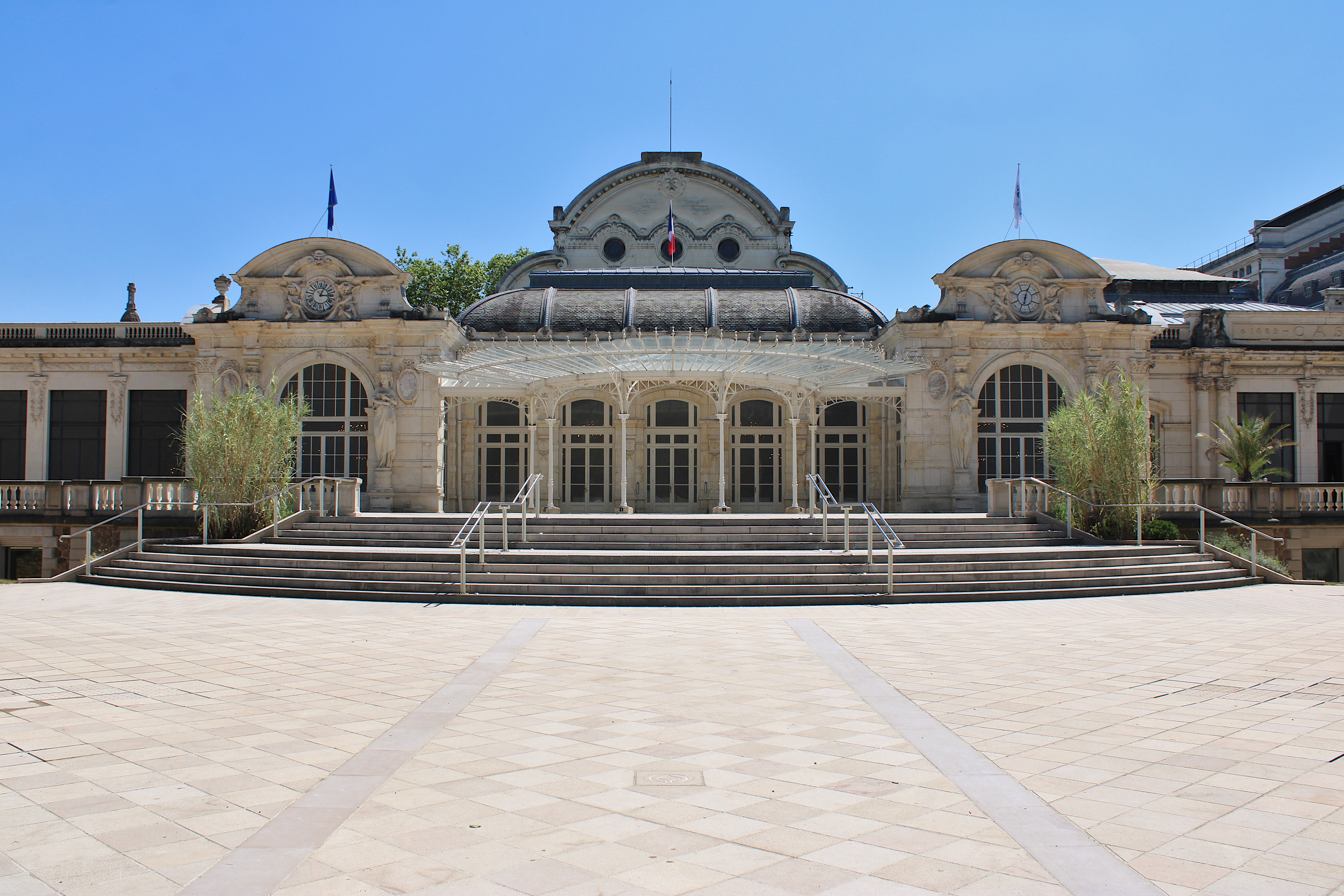
The Opera in Vichy. In this building, parliamentarians of the French Third Republic granted full powers to Marshal Philippe Pétain on 10 July 1940.

Following the stunning defeat of Allied forces in just four weeks, on 10 June 1940 the French government fled Paris for Bordeaux. On 22 June, France signed an armistice, which stipulated German occupation of the north and west of the country, including Paris and all of the Atlantic coast. The remaining two-fifths of France became the unoccupied Free Zone (Zone Libre). On 29 June the government and its parliamentarians moved to Clermont-Ferrand. Finding the city too cramped, on 1 July it moved on to Vichy.

German forces had taken the city unopposed on 19 June, but departed with the Armistice. Vichy had the country's second largest hotel capacity, and a modern telephone exchange and post office built for its international visitors. The city was in the unoccupied zone 45 km (28 mi) south of the Demarcation Line, relatively close to Paris (4.5 hours by train), and surrounded by productive agricultural lands. Pierre Laval, soon to be Prime Minister, hailed from Châteldon, a village 20 km (12 mi) south of Vichy. The city was, in any case, expected to be only a temporary seat of government until signature of the peace treaty.

On 9–10 July, 670 of the 846 members of the Senate and Chamber of Deputies met in the Vichy Opera House, where they overwhelmingly voted full powers to Philippe Pétain and authorized him to revise the constitution. The new regime called itself simply the French State (État Français), but it quickly came to be known as Vichy France. While Paris remained the official capital and much of the bureaucracy stayed there, Vichy was the de facto capital. It was home to Pétain's cabinet, top civil servants, the diplomatic corps, and the neutered parliamentarians. As the volume of individuals engaged in government activity adversely affected locals and the spa business, a system of residence permits was established that permitted only five days' maximum stay between 1 June and 30 September.

Following the Anglo-American invasion of North Africa in November 1942, Germany occupied the Free Zone, including Vichy. The Pétain government remained, albeit with an even smaller range of effective action. The city became a center for Gestapo and the Vichy milice. After the Allied breakout from Normandy in August 1944, the Germans took Pétain and his entourage to exile in Germany. The Envoy of the Swiss Confederation to France, Minister Walter Stucki, arranged for the peaceful withdrawal of local German forces and the milice. The FFI liberated the city on 26 August without bloodshed.

The term "Vichyste", which designates partisans of the Pétain regime, should not be confused with "Vichyssois" which designates the inhabitants of the city.

=== Reine des villes d'eaux ===
The 1950s and 1960s would become the most ostentatious period for Vichy, complete with parading personalities, visits from crowned heads (Thami El Glaoui, the Pasha of Marrakech; Prince Rainier III of Monaco) and profits from a massive influx of North African French clients who holidayed in Vichy, spending lavishly. There were thirteen cinemas (which sometimes showed special previews), eight dance halls and three theatres. It was at this period that the station would take the title of "Reine des villes d'eaux" (Queen of the Spa Towns).

From June to September, so many French-Algerian tourists were arriving that it almost seemed like there was an airlift set up between Vichy-Charmeil and the airports of Algeria. Mayor Pierre Coulon (1950–1967) decided to create Lake Allier (10 June 1963) and Omnisports Park (1963–68), giving the city its current look.

=== Decline of Vichy ===
The war in Algeria (1950s–60s), which led to decolonization, marked once again a halt in the prosperity of Vichy, which from then on had to deal with much less favorable conditions. The need to continue to pay the debts incurred by the considerable investments that had been made in more prosperous times obligated the new mayor, Jacques Lacarin (1967–1989), the successor of Pierre Coulon, to adopt a much more careful policy of management.

=== Modern revival ===
Claude Malhuret, former Minister of Human Rights, born in Strasbourg in 1950, was mayor from 1989 to 2017. He and Bernard Kouchner are the co-founders of Doctors Without Borders (Médecins Sans Frontières). The city and its economic partners have concluded an important program of restoration and modernization. These projects include:

- creation of a vast pedestrian zone in the city center
- a program of modernization
- upgrading of hotels to the sector standards
- rebuilding and restoration of the thermal baths
- organization of a balneotherapy center dedicated to well-being
- development of the architectural heritage
- construction of a congress center within the old Casino
- restoration of the Opera
- rebuilding of the covered market, called "Grand Marché" (2006)
- restoration of the train station and surroundings (2009)
- restoration of the "Rue de Paris", a main street in the city centre (2010)

== Administration ==
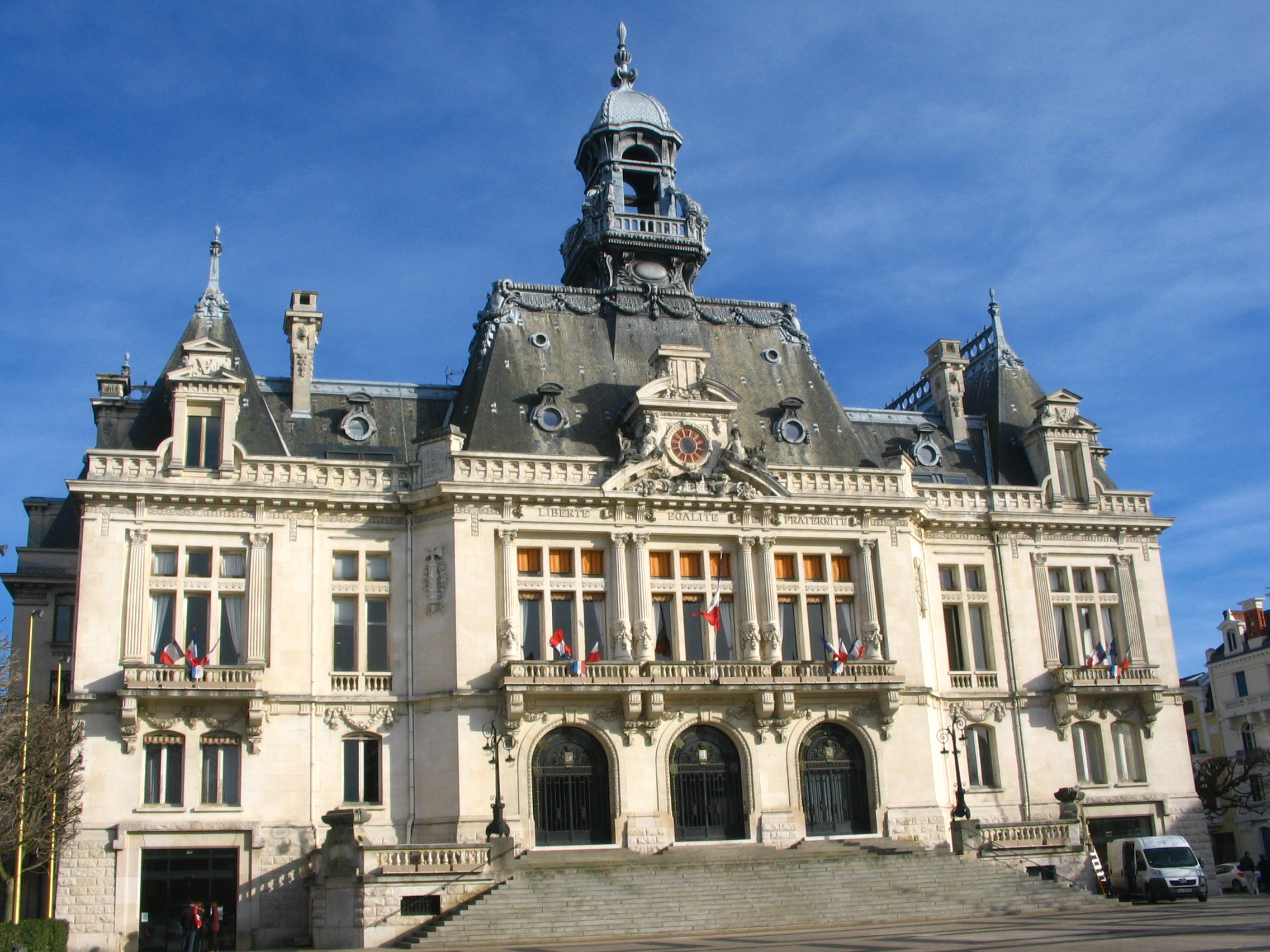
The Hôtel de Ville

List of successive Mayors
Period	Identity	Party	Profession
October 2017	Frédéric Aguilera	LR	
March 1989 to September 2017	Claude Malhuret	UMP	Physician
September 1967 to March 1989	Jacques Lacarin		Physician
August 1950 to August 1967	Pierre Coulon		Industrialist
April 1949 to July 1950	Pierre-Victor Léger		Pharmacist
May 1945 to April 1949	Louis Moinard		Trader
August 1944 to May 1945	Jean Barbier		Director of College
May 1929 to August 1944	Pierre-Victor Léger		Pharmacist
December 1919 to May 1929	Louis Lasteyras		Journalist
May 1912 to November 1919	Armand Bernard		Shareholder
May 1900 to May 1912	Louis Lasteyras		Journalist
21 May 1893 to 20 May 1900	Ferdinand Debrest		Pharmacist
15 May 1892 to 21 May 1893	Gabriel Nicolas		Lawyer
June 1879 to May 1892	Georges Durin		Lawyer
January to September 1878	Alfred Bulot		Lawyer
1876 to 1878	Antoine Jardet		Physician
1874 to 1876	Ernest Jaurand		Physician
1870 to 1874	Antoine Jardet		Physician
15 September 1865 to 9 September 1870	Joseph Bousquet		Lawyer
7 May 1860 to 15 September 1865	Norbert Leroy		Notary
7 May 1857 to 7 May 1860	Antoine Guillermen		Hotel owner
20 August 1853 to 7 May 1860	Victor Noyer		Surgeon
August 1848 to 1853	Victor Prunelle		Physician and Waters inspector
1843 to 1848	Claude Ramin-Prêtre		Hotel owner
1833 to 1842	Christophe Bulot		Shareholder
1831 to 1832	Louis Chaloin		Hotel master
1822 to 1831	Baron Lucas		Physician and Waters inspector
26 October 1815 to 1822	Antoine Fouet		
21 May 1815 to 26 October 1815	Jean-Joseph Gravier		
17 March 1814 to 21 May 1815	Antoine Fouet		
1809 to 10 March 1814	Godefroy de Bardon		
29 March 1805 to 1809	Gilbert Chocheprat		
November 1802 to 29 March 1805	Godefroy de Bardon		
13 July 1800 to November 1802	Louis-Antoine Sauret		
1798 to 1800	Jean-Joseph Gravier Du Monceau		
1791 to 1795	Jean-Joseph Gravier Du Monceau		
2 February 1790 to 13 November 1791	François-Claude Chocheprat		

== Population ==
Historical population

Year	Pop.	±% p.a.
1793	1,763	—
1800	839	−10.06%
1806	1,000	+2.97%
1821	776	−1.68%
1831	985	+2.41%
1836	1,148	+3.11%
1841	1,361	+3.46%
1846	1,601	+3.30%
1851	1,696	+1.16%
1856	2,910	+11.40%
1861	3,740	+5.15%
1866	5,666	+8.66%
1872	6,028	+1.04%
1876	6,428	+1.62%
1881	8,486	+5.71%
1886	10,344	+4.04%
1891	10,870	+1.00%
1896	12,330	+2.55%
1901	14,254	+2.94%

Year	Pop.	±% p.a.
1906	15,315	+1.45%
1911	16,502	+1.50%
1921	17,501	+0.59%
1926	19,507	+2.19%
1931	22,207	+2.63%
1936	25,074	+2.46%
1946	29,370	+1.59%
1954	30,403	+0.43%
1962	30,614	+0.09%
1968	33,506	+1.52%
1975	32,117	−0.60%
1982	30,527	−0.72%
1990	27,714	−1.20%
1999	26,528	−0.48%
2007	25,467	−0.51%
2012	25,315	−0.12%
2017	24,166	−0.92%
2023	25,115	+0.64%

Source: EHESS and INSEE (1968-2023)

== Economy ==
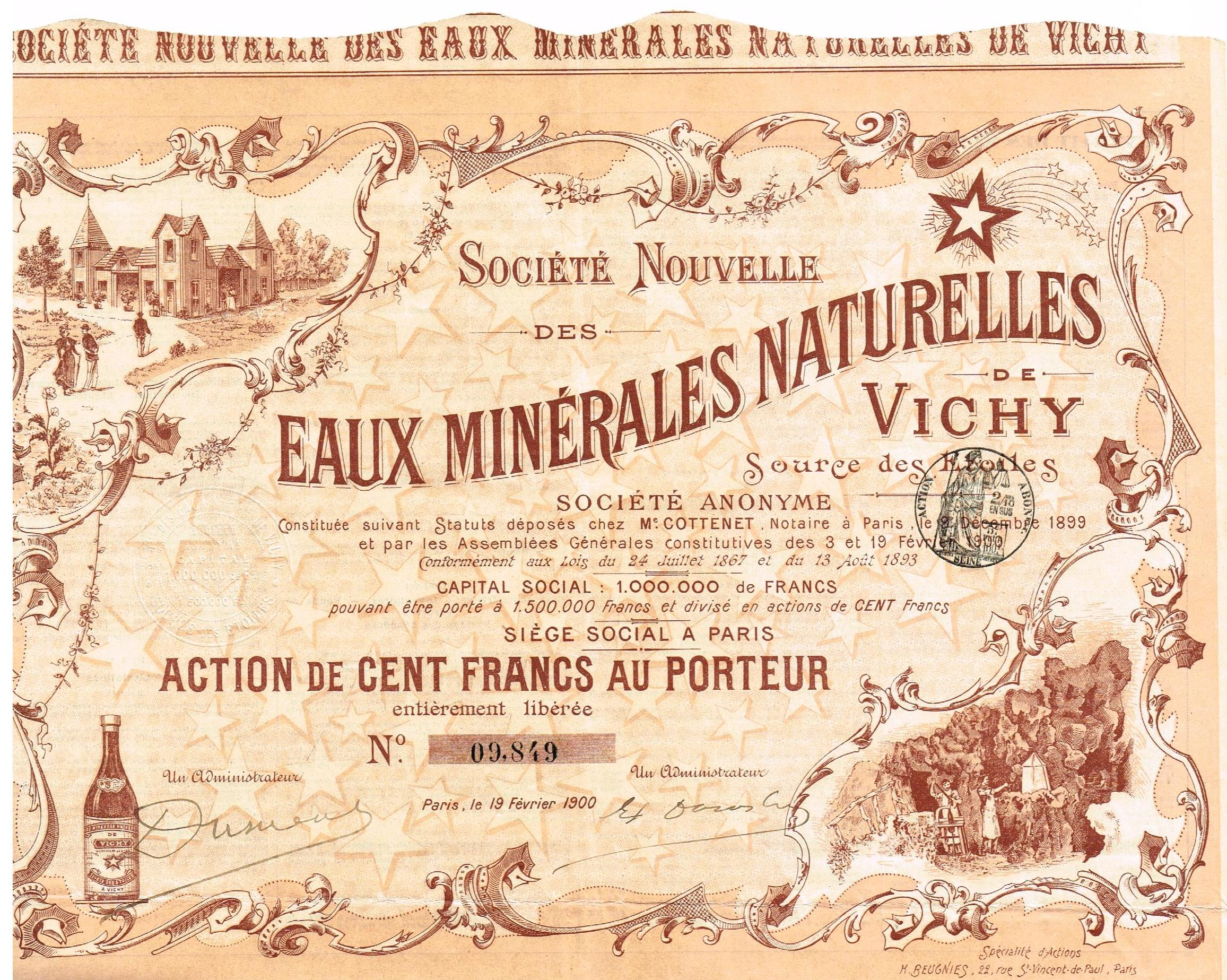
Share of the New Society of Natural Mineral Waters of Vichy, issued 19 February 1900

The city was first noted for its thermal cures in Roman times. Its waters come from springs such as the Vichy Celestins and Vichy Saint-Yorre.

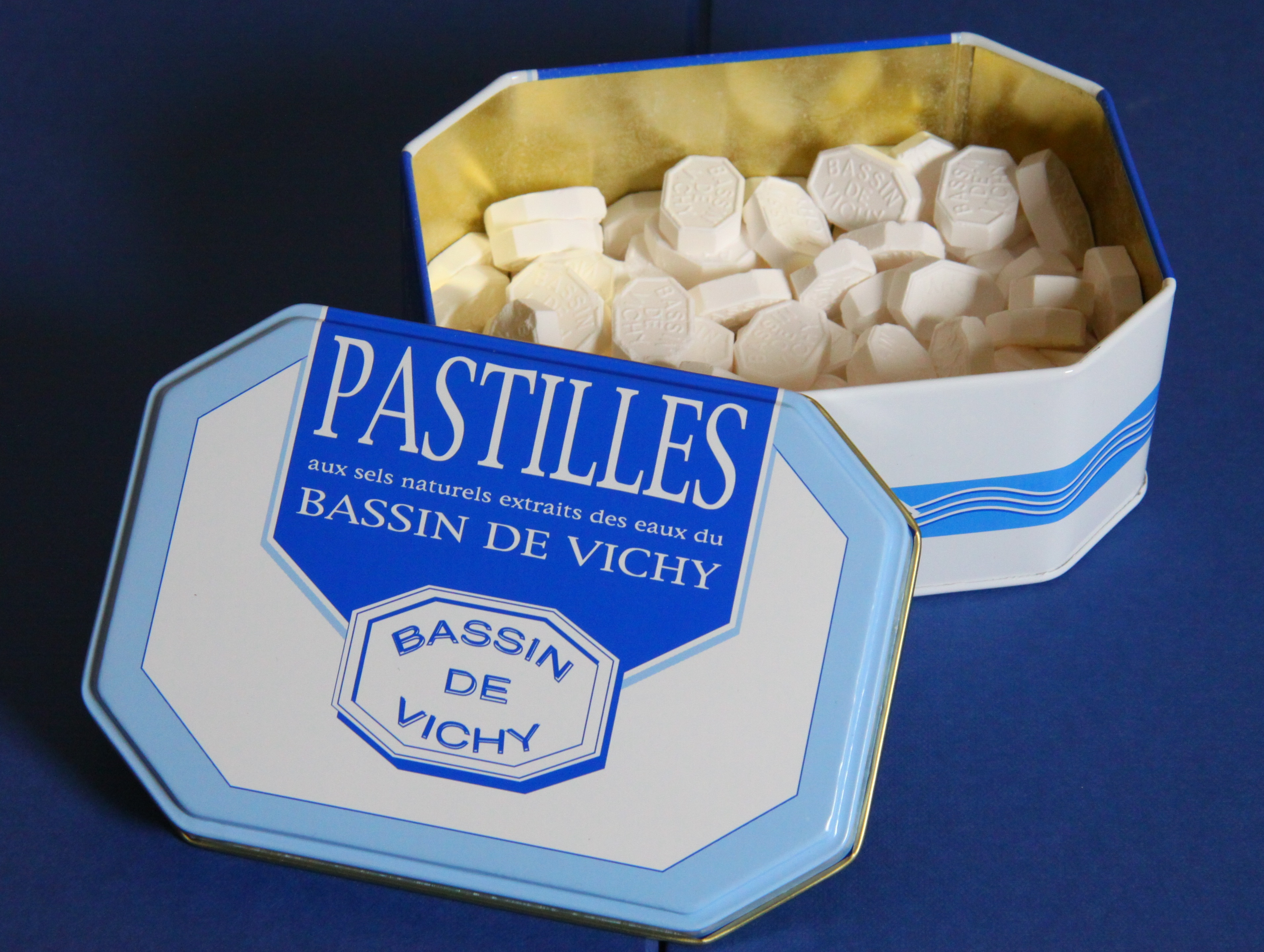
A tin of Vichy Pastilles

Vichy Pastilles (made in Vichy) are octagon-shaped candies made from soda contained in the spring waters.

The health and beauty business, with the laboratories of the L'Oréal company, also make it possible to publicize the city's name to a worldwide audience under the Vichy brand.

Unlike the neighbouring communes on the Allier such as industrial Montluçon and administrative seat Moulins, Vichy's economy is centred on the tertiary sector, with companies like the Compagnie de Vichy developing the health and well-being sector to mitigate the decline of medical hydrotherapy. The local market, open on Sundays, attracts shoppers from tens of kilometres around.

The closing of two important local employers, the Manurhin company and the Sediver company, has reduced employment in the Vichy basin. Job creation by developing companies such as the NSE electronics company or the Satel call center company may not completely compensate for the removal of jobs, despite the internet tour operator Karavel's establishment of a new call center in May 2005.

Nevertheless, the two most important employers of the city belong to the public sector: the hospital (1,120 employees), and the Hôtel de Ville (500).

Since 1989, Vichy has been one of the seven sites of the European Total Quality Institute (Institut Européen de la Qualité Totale).

The Pôle Universitaire de Vichy (previously called Pôle Universitaire et Technologique Lardy), born from a project of thermal waste land rehabilitation and launched during the mid-1990s, is an economic priority. This 9,000 m^{2} (2.2 acres) campus accommodates 600 students in the downtown area, in ten areas of study including the fields of biotechnology, international trade, multi-media and languages.

The CAVILAM – Alliance Française (Centre of Live Approaches to Languages and the Media), receives students from diverse countries who want to learn French. Created in 1964, under the impulse of the Universities of Clermont-Ferrand and the city of Vichy, CAVILAM – Alliance Française joined the international network of the Alliance Française in 2012. After the Covid lockdown, the center developed online courses for FLE teachers, FLE ressources pages, and foreign language courses for locals.

The Palace of the Congresses is a venue primarily for the conferences of trade associations and learned societies. The structure is 1,800 m^{2} (19,000 sq ft) in area, including two plenary rooms and fifteen multi-use rooms. With 25,000 visitors yearly, the conferences must carry the economic role once held by the hydrotherapy industry, which today counts only 12,000 patients each year. The hydrotherapy business will now have to reorganise itself to take a less strict therapeutic-only role, and adapt to patients' stays shorter than the traditional three weeks.

=== Building projects ===
Under the authority of the local communities, much work is being done on building sites and projects, which will deeply modify Vichy in the years to come. The construction by the Hotel of the Community of Agglomeration in September 2005 on the old site of the "Commercial City" may precede the total restoration of the market hall "Le Grand Marché" (which would cost €5.9 million) which would be delivered in September 2006. Other projects include the creation of a 12,000 m^{2} (130,000 sq ft) mother-child centre in the hospital complex, the restoration of the spa façade (removal of the metal boarding to uncover the original style of 1862), the transformation of the spa into a multi-use center, creation of parks with fountains in place of parking lots, the demolition and the transformation of the buildings in a congested area to create an enterprise center intended to create 800 jobs (opened in early 2008), the construction of a new aquatic stadium including five basins (open since 2008), and motorway connection (opened in early 2015).

== Notable people ==
- Valery Larbaud (1881–1957), writer
- Albert Londres (1884–1932), journalist
- Guy Ligier (1930–2015), racing driver and founder of Équipe Ligier
- Raël (born 1946), religious leader and founder of the Raëlian Religious Movement
- Wilfried Moimbe (born 1988), footballer

== Religion ==
A wide variety of faiths are practiced. Various Christian denominations such as diverse Orthodox, Catholic, and Protestant churches are found throughout the area along with adherents of Judaism, Islam, Buddhism, and others.

- Catholicism: Presbytère Saint-Louis Saint-Blaise de Vichy (in French) at 33 Rue Sainte-Cécile and Presbytère Sainte Jeanne d'Arc at 2 Rue Jeanne d'Arc
- Russian Orthodox Church: the nearby Château de Saint-Hubert in Chavenon
- Calvinism: Église reformée located at 9 Rue de l'Intendance
- Lutheranism: Église Saint-Blaise de Vichy (in French) located on the Rue de l'Église
- Judaism: the Synagogue of Vichy located at 2 Bis Rue Maréchal Foch
- Islam: the Mosquée al-Rahma located at 51 Allée des Ailes
- Buddhism: the nearby Pagode Phap Vuong in Noyant-d'Allier

== Transport ==
=== Highway access ===
Vichy is accessible from departmental road 2209, former route nationale 209 (from the towns of Gannat or Varennes-sur-Allier), the D906e, former D906 from Thiers, the D1093 from Randan or the D6 from Charmeil.

The city is situated 6 km (3.7 mi) from the A719 autoroute and 35 km (22 mi) from the A89 autoroute.

The A719 autoroute, connecting Vichy to the A71 to Clermont-Ferrand, opened in January 2015.

In 2014, only regional two-lane highways (routes départementales) pass through the urban ring of Vichy. The D2209 is the principal axis of circulation for heavily loaded trucks, from the west (via Gannat) or the north (via Varennes-sur-Allier or Saint-Germain-des-Fossés); other important routes are the following (listed in the clockwise order):

- the D906e, former D906, from the south (Abrest, Saint-Yorre, Thiers, Ambert, Livradois and Le Puy-en-Velay);
- the D1093, from the southwest (Forest of Randan, Grande Limagne, Maringues, Riom, Clermont-Ferrand);
- the D984, from the west-southwest (Bellerive-sur-Allier, Effiat, Aigueperse);
- the D6, from the northwest (Charmeil, Saint-Pourçain-sur-Sioule).

The D67 is a loop to the north of the city created to limit traffic jams (access to Creuzier-le-Neuf, afterwards by the D907, Lapalisse and the N7).

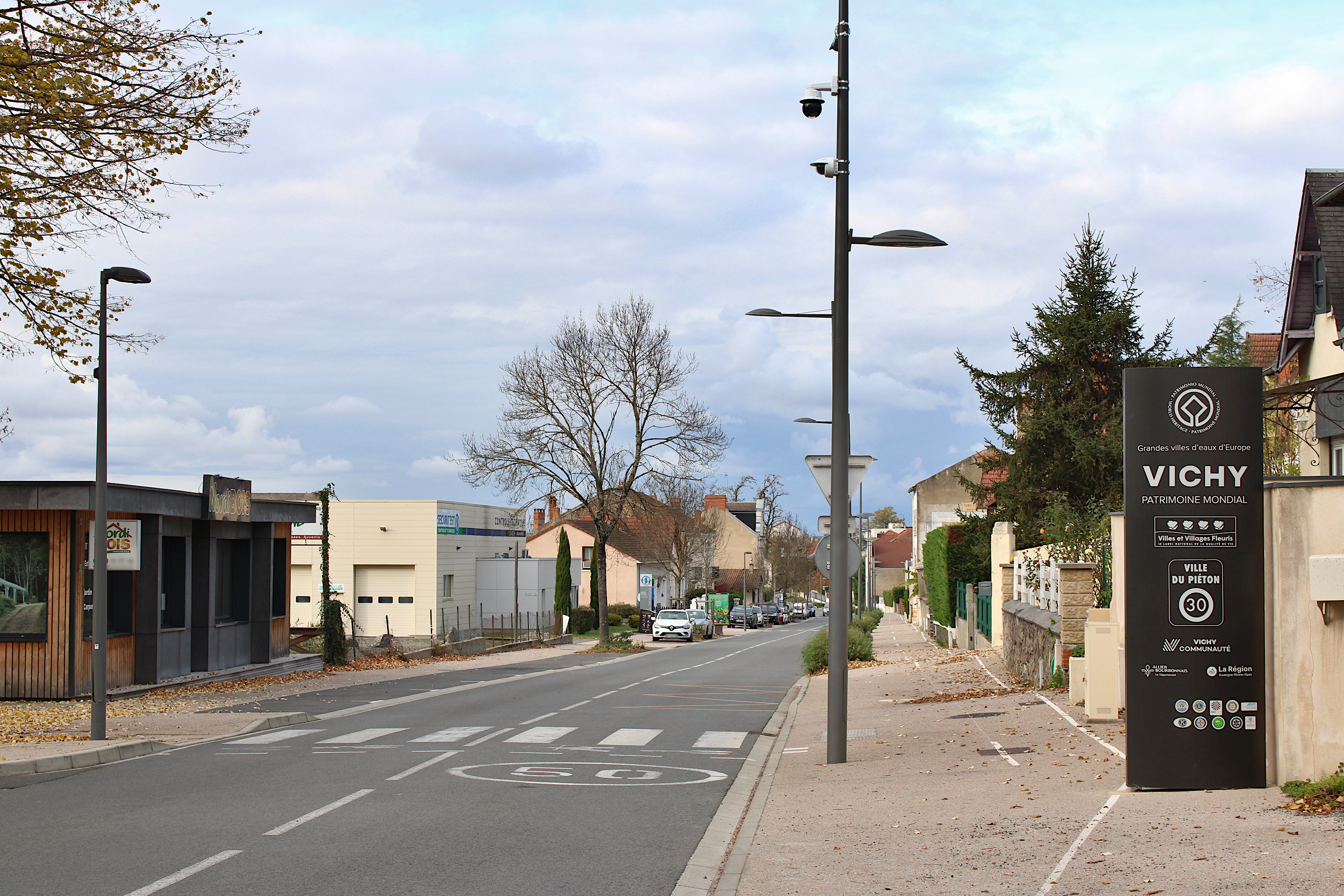
Entrance by departmental road 906e from Thiers

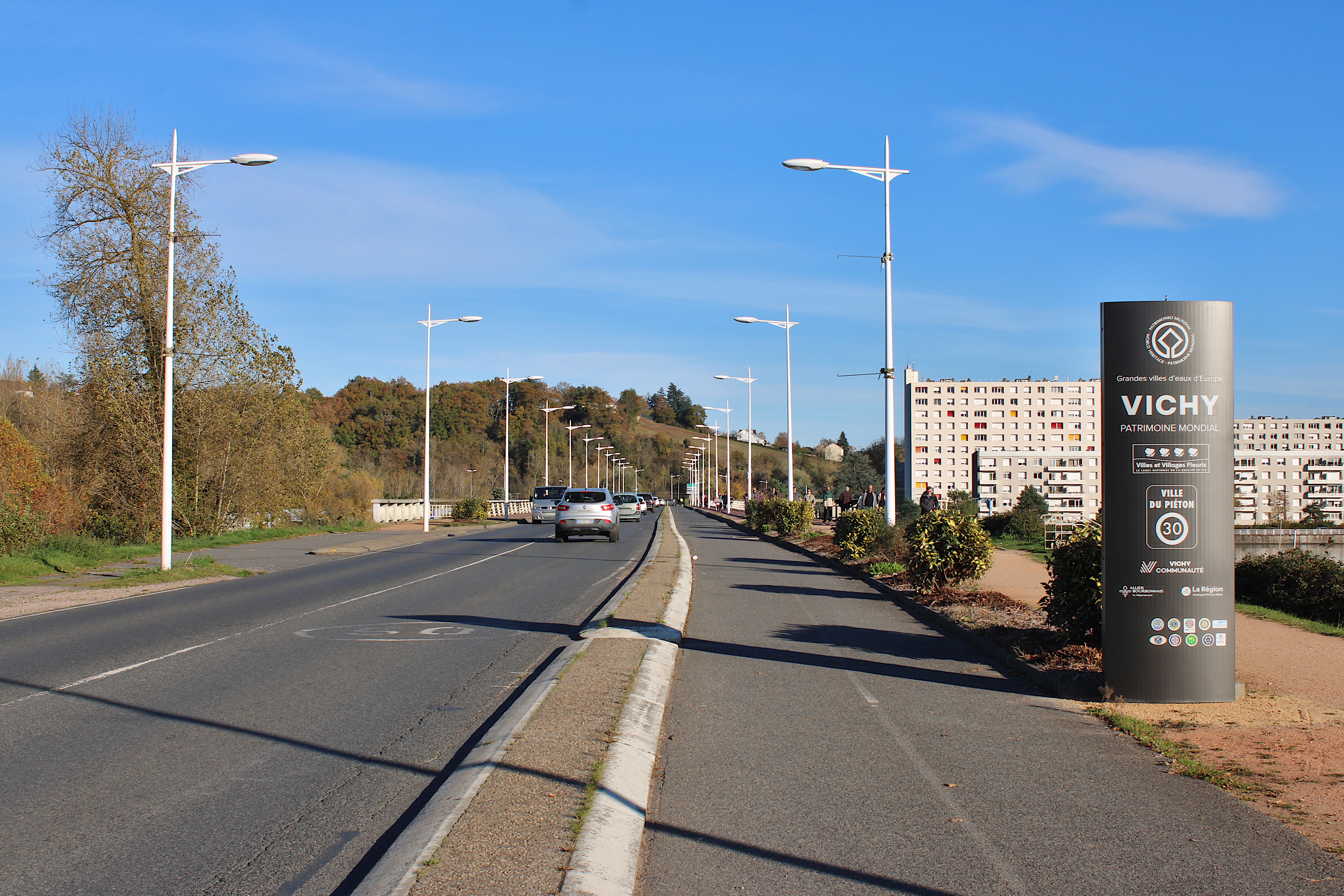
Entrance by the Pont de l'Europe

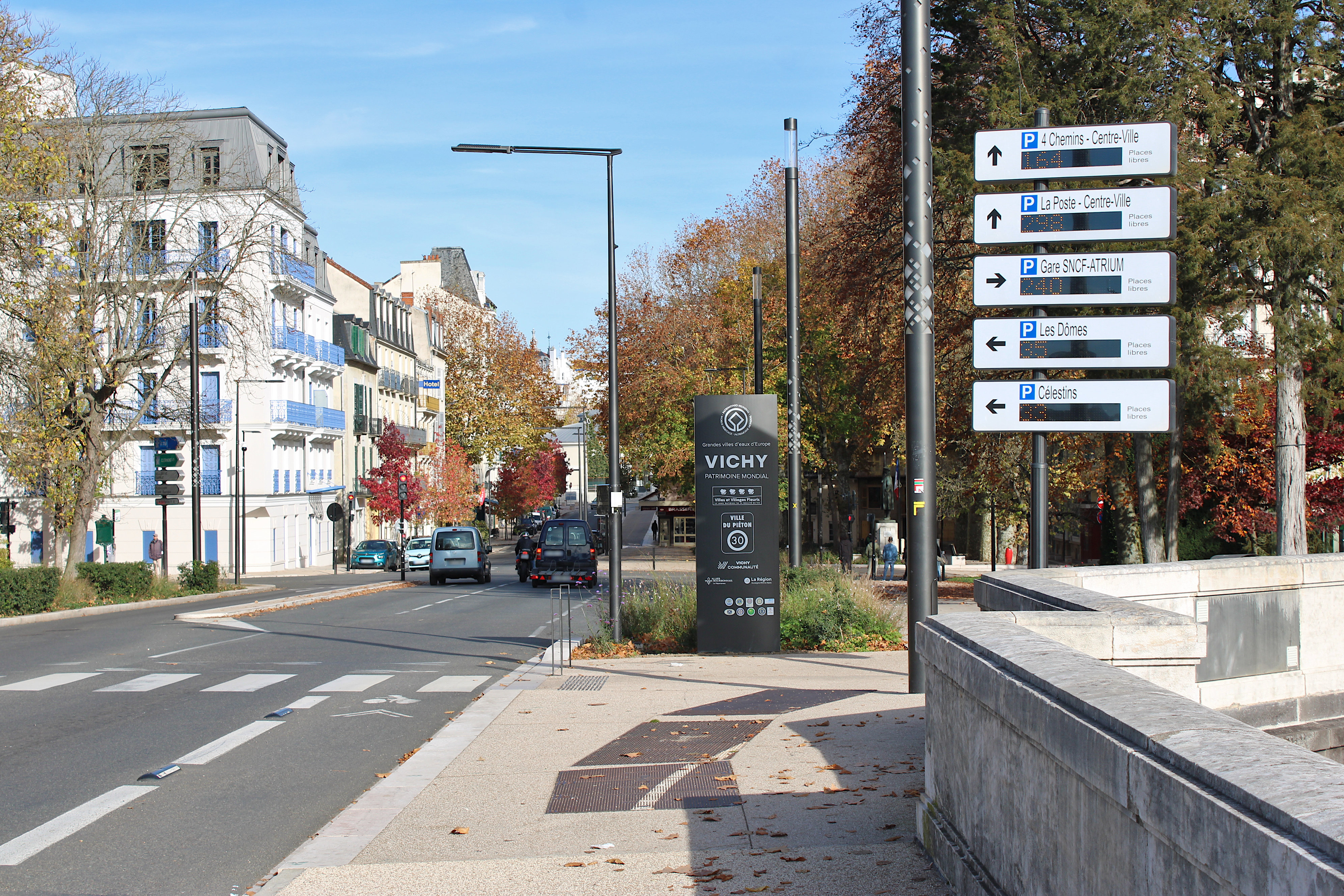
Entrance by Jacques-Chirac bridge

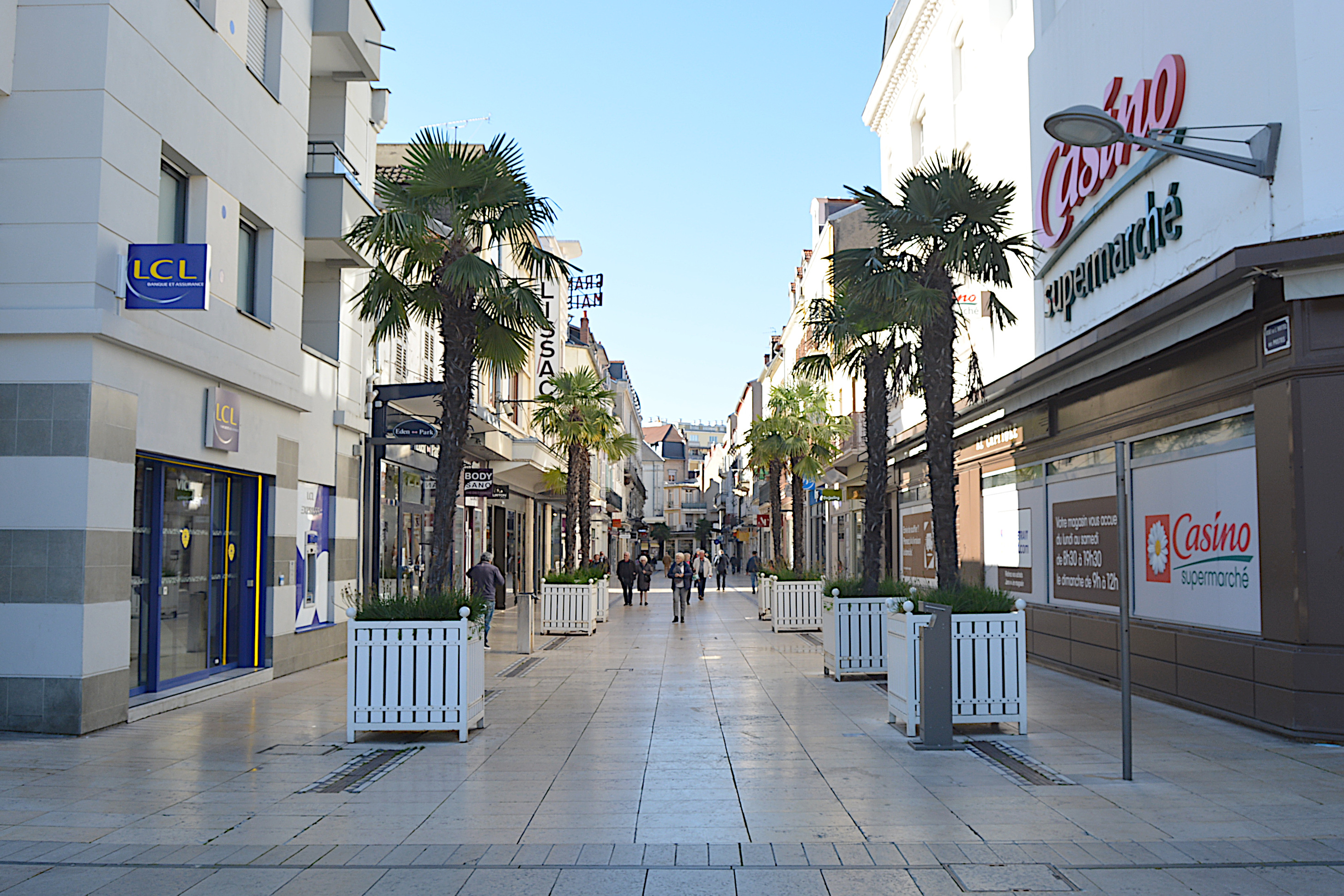
Rue de l'Hôtel des Postes, a pedestrian way

=== Rail transport ===
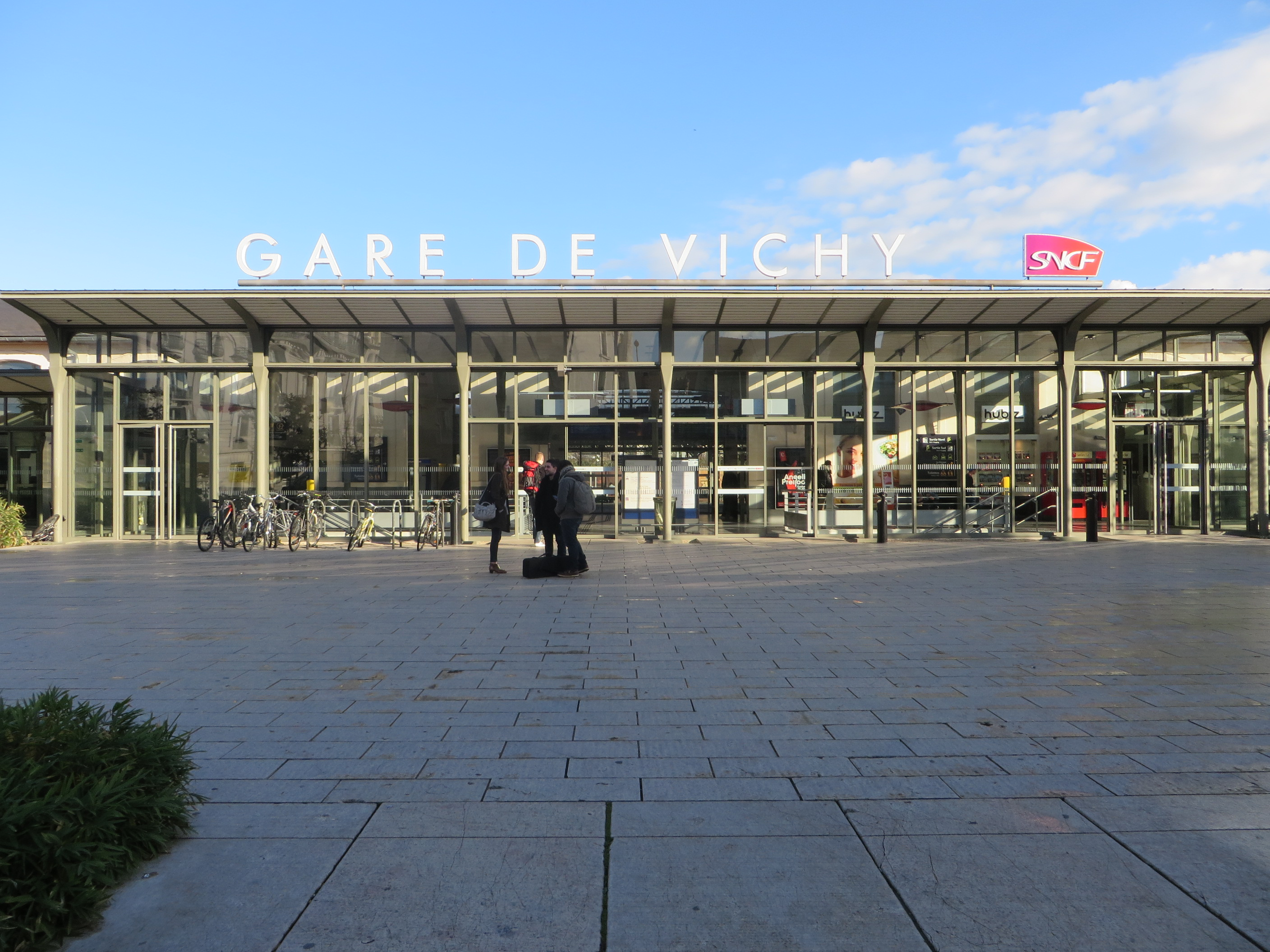
Railway station in 2015.

Vichy is served by the following train lines:

- Intercités (national trains, booking mandatory) to Paris (Bercy) and Clermont-Ferrand;
- TER trains: Moulins, Lyon (Part-Dieu and Perrache), Clermont-Ferrand, Vic-le-Comte, Issoire, and Brioude.

=== Public transport ===
MobiVie is the network of urban transport for six communes of Vichy Communauté intercommunality. This network is composed of eight lines as of 2022.

"Mobival" is an on-call transportation service for Vichy and its neighborhood. This service offers the local communes a reliable transportation service for areas that are not served by the MobiVie network. Created in October 2004, it has ten lines.

=== Air transport ===
Vichy is five kilometres (3.1 mi) from Vichy — Charmeil Airport. However, there aren't any scheduled flights to and from the airport. The nearest airports are Clermont-Ferrand Auvergne Airport, located 66 kilometres (41 mi) south west and Lyon–Saint-Exupéry Airport, located 235 kilometres (146 mi) south east of Vichy.

== Cultural events ==
Vichy hosted the 2024 Europe Triathlon Championships on 21–22 September, attracting top athletes from across Europe. Known for its picturesque setting and rich sporting history, Vichy has previously welcomed major events like Challenge and Ironman. The championships further cemented its status as a premier triathlon destination.

== Twin towns – sister cities ==
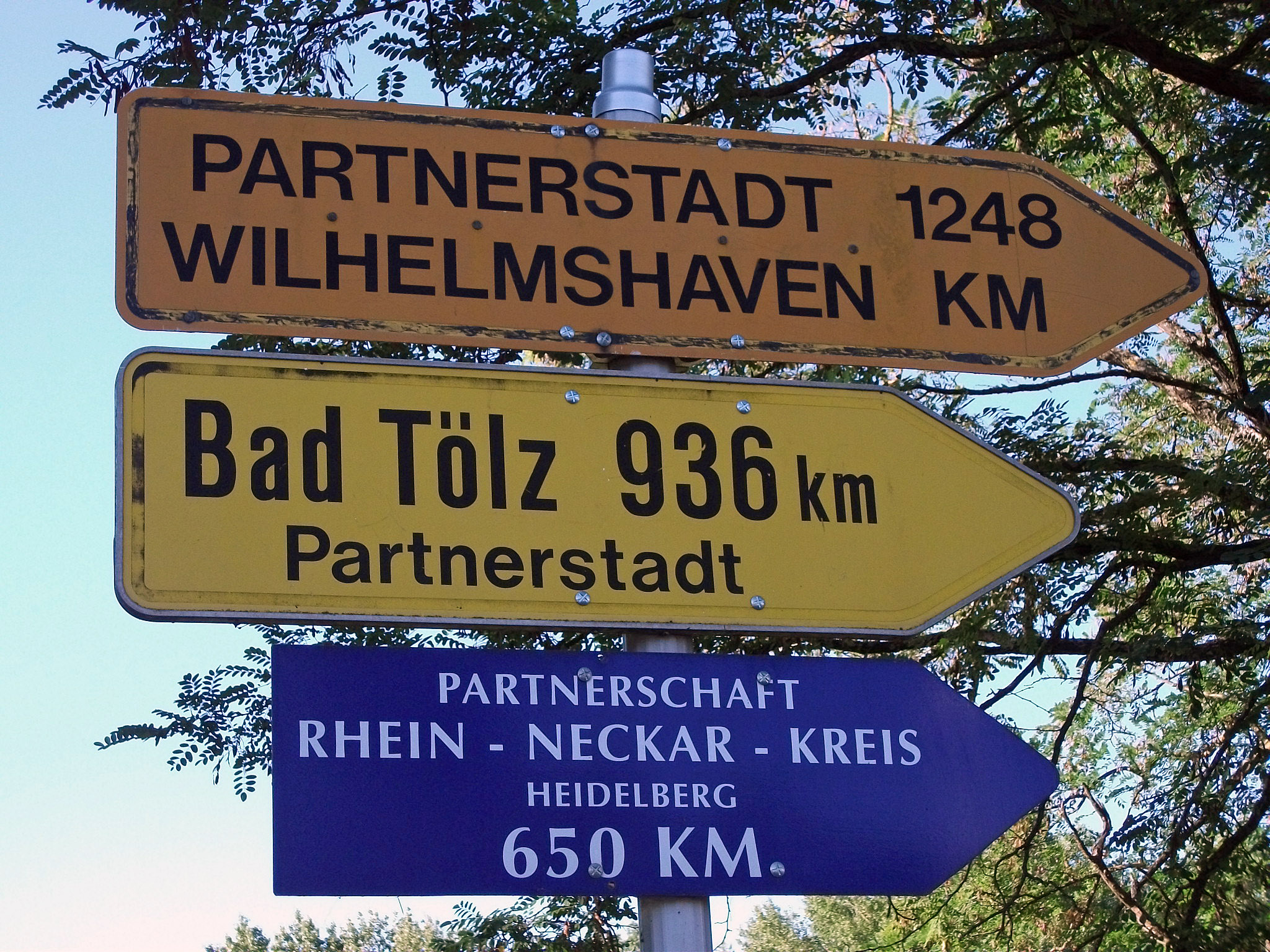
Signs showing German twin towns

Vichy is twinned with:

- Bad Tölz, Germany
- Dunfermline, Scotland, United Kingdom
- Rhein-Neckar (district), Germany
- San Giuliano Terme, Italy
- Wilhelmshaven, Germany

== See also ==
- Communes of the Allier department
- Incident at Vichy
- List of spa towns in France
