= Charmeil =

- Commune
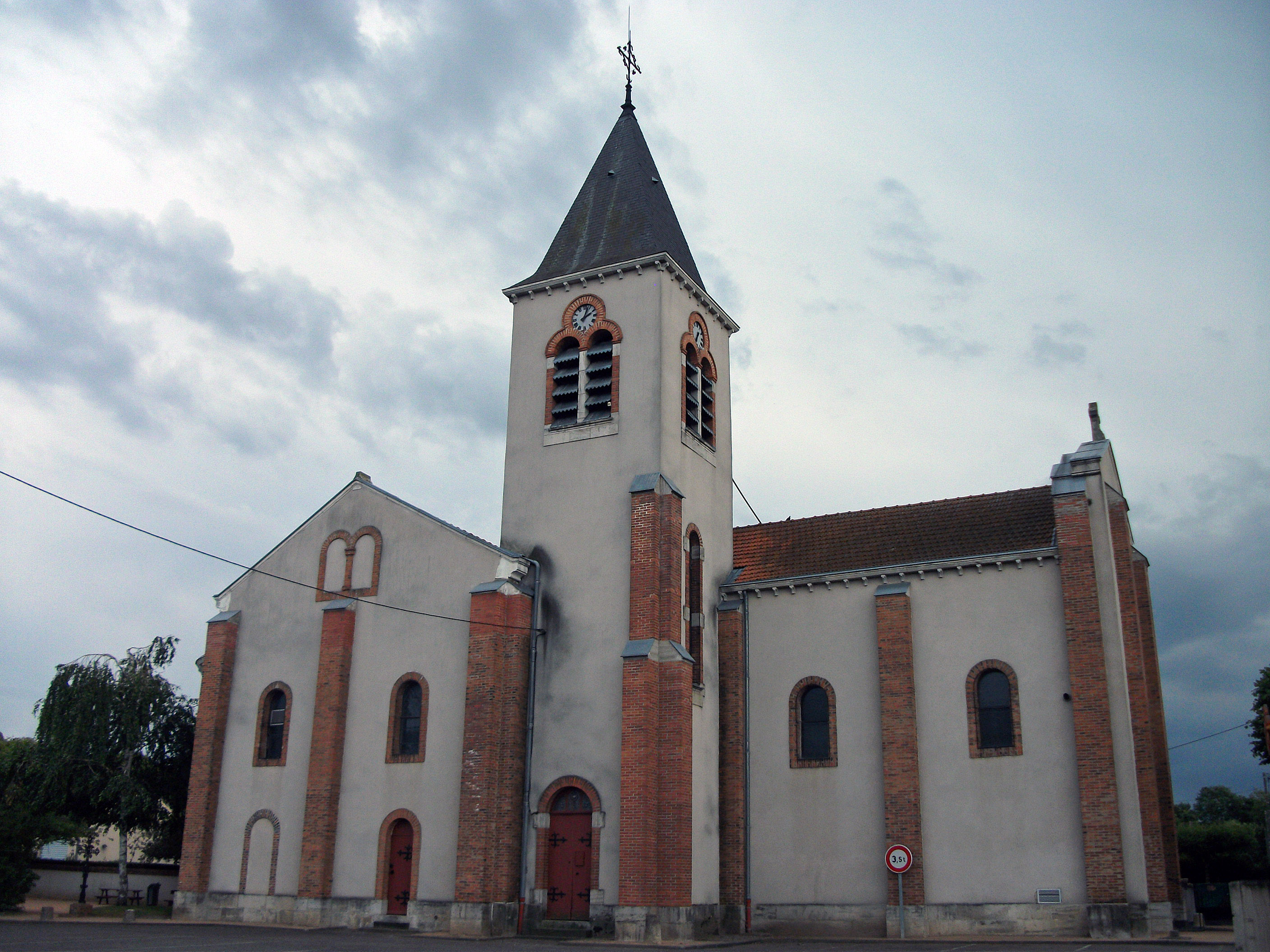
- Church
- Location of Charmeil
- Location within France Location within Auvergne-Rhône-Alpes
- Coordinates: 46°09′44″N 3°23′38″E
- Country: France
- Region: Auvergne-Rhône-Alpes
- Department: Allier
- Arrondissement: Vichy
- Canton: Vichy-1
- Intercommunality: CA Vichy Communauté

Government
  - Mayor (2026–32): Franck Gonzales
- Area^{1}: 7.4 km^{2} (2.9 sq mi)
- Elevation: 220 m (720 ft)
- Highest elevation: 311 m (1,020 ft)
- Lowest elevation: 243 m (797 ft)
- Population (2023): 947
  - Density: 130/km^{2} (330/sq mi)
- Time zone: UTC+01:00 (CET)
  - Summer (DST): UTC+02:00 (CEST)
- INSEE/Postal code: 03060 /03110
- ^{1} French Land Register data, which excludes lakes, ponds, glaciers > 1 km^{2} (0.386 sq mi or 247 acres) and river estuaries.

Charmeil (French pronunciation: [ʃaʁmɛj]; Occitan: Chalmelh) is a commune in the Allier department in central France.

== Geography ==
Accessible by departmental roads 6 and 27, Charmeil is located 5 kilometres (3.1 mi) northwest of Vichy, 3 kilometres (1.9 mi) south of Saint-Rémy-en-Rollat, 4 kilometres (2.5 mi) east of Vendat, and 4 kilometres (2.5 mi) north of Bellerive-sur-Allier.

A weather station is located on the site of the airport, elevation: 249 metres (817 ft).

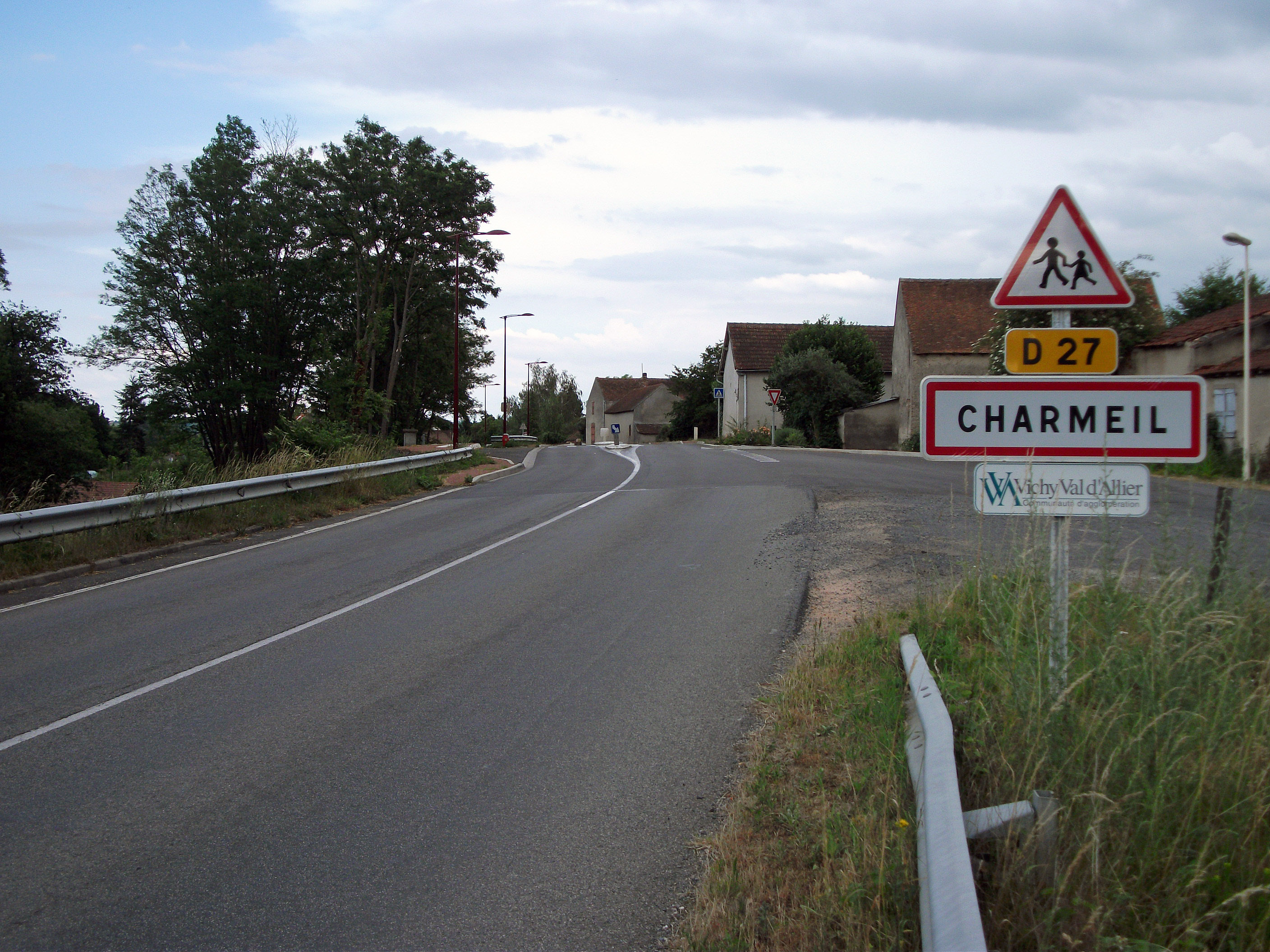
D 27 from Vendat

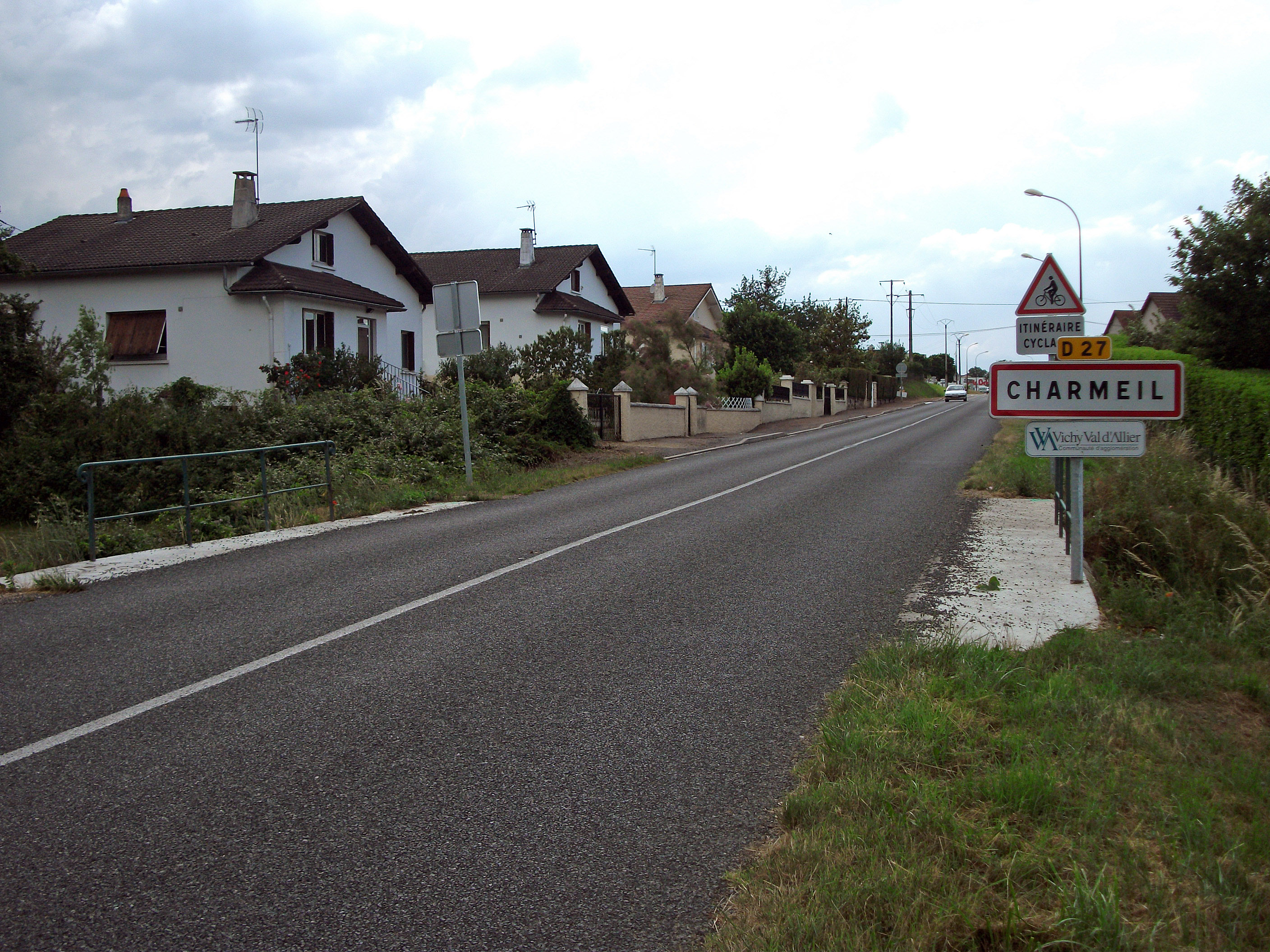
D 27 from Boutiron bridge

== Administration ==
List of successive mayors:

- 2001-2014: Andrée-Claude Petillat
- 2014-current: Franck Gonzales

== Population ==
Historical population
Year	Pop.	±% p.a.
1968	306	—
1975	363	+2.47%
1982	562	+6.44%
1990	564	+0.04%
1999	609	+0.86%
2007	724	+2.19%
2012	790	+1.76%
2017	983	+4.47%
2023	947	−0.62%
Source: INSEE

== Economy ==
Charmeil has a commercial area with signs: Mr Bricolage, Jardiland, a GiFi store, Lidl, and local merchants.

== Culture and Heritage ==
- Charmeil Castle, which was the summer residence of Marshal Philippe Pétain in 1943 and which was held including a secret meeting between Pierre Laval and the advisor of German Rudolf Rahn embassy minister in August 1942.
- Church
- Boutiron bridge (on departmental road 27, between Charmeil and Creuzier-le-Vieux, Monument historique since 2021)

== See also ==
- Vichy — Charmeil Airport
- Communes of the Allier department
