= Opéra de Vichy =

Opera house in Vichy

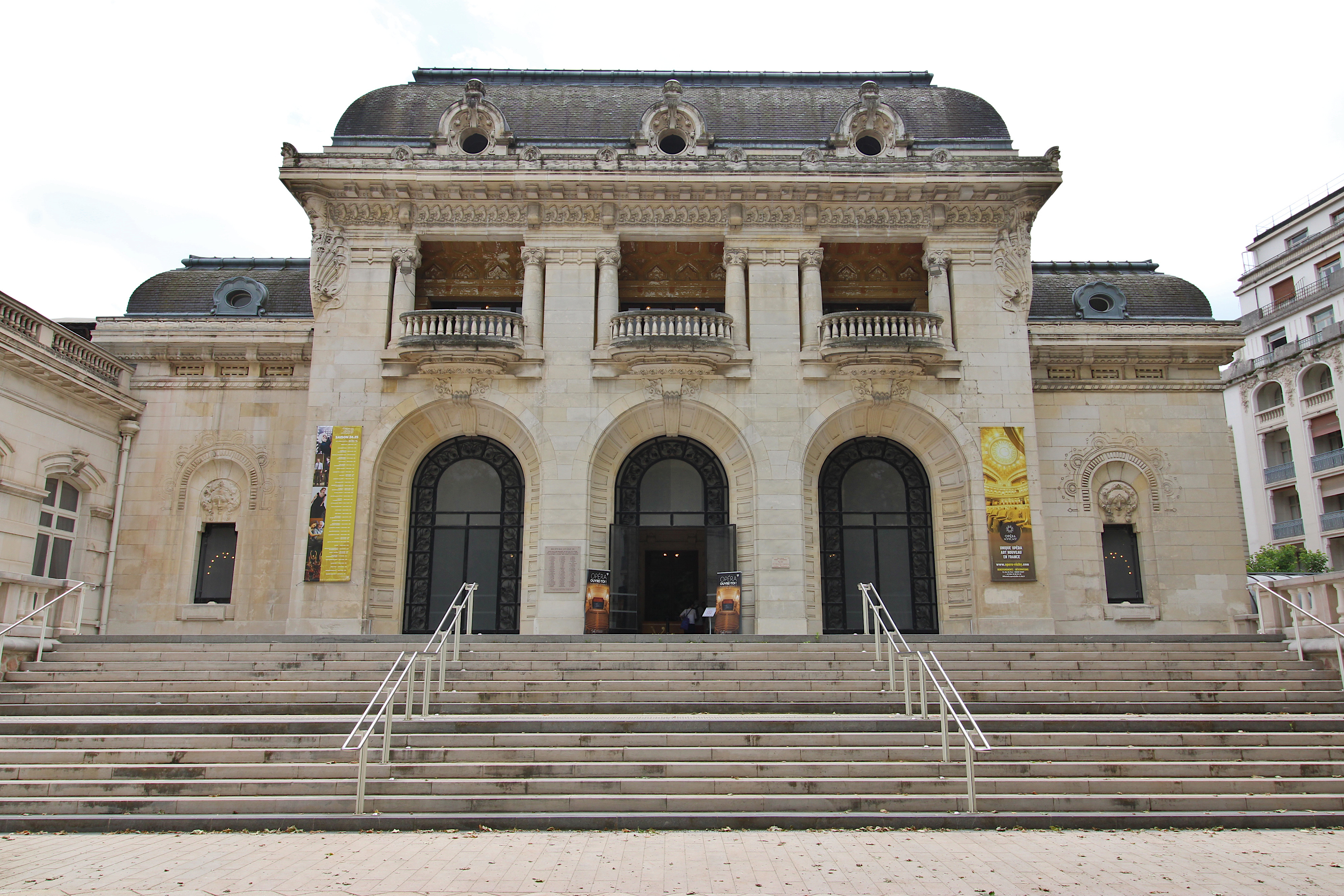
- Entrance of the building in 2025
- Interactive map of the Opéra de Vichy area

General information
- Location: Vichy, France
- Coordinates: 46.12323°N 3.41946°E
- Opening: 31 March 1903
- Operator: Ville de Vichy

Design and construction
- Architects: Charles Le Cœur, Lucien Woog

Website
- opera-vichy.com

The Opéra de Vichy is an opera house located in the French city of Vichy. The building, designed in an Art Nouveau style, is situated adjacent to the Parc des Sources and across the street from the former Hôtel des Ambassadeurs.

The Vichy Opera offers year-round programming: the Saison (September to May) presents a multidisciplinary program: theatre, dance, opera, comedy, concerts, etc. Since 2018, a summer program in July and August featuring lyrical, symphonic, jazz, dance, pop rock and world music concerts takes place.

Since October 2017, Martin Kubich has been the Director of Culture for the city of Vichy and for Vichy Culture, which encompasses the opera, the Vichy cultural center and the exhibitions department; he thus succeeded Diane Polya-Zeitline.

== History ==
The first casino was built at the request of Napoleon III from 1864 to 1865 by the architect Charles Badger, architect of the Compagnie fermière de Vichy. It was inaugurated on July 2, 1865. It then had a theatre hall. But its old-fashioned appearance and the inadequacy of the services it could offer meant that it was extended at the beginning of the 20th century, to the location of the bandstand of 1866, which was moved to the Place de la République (which would be destroyed in 1935 for the construction of the Post Office). The old theatre was then converted into a games room (now transformed into the large auditorium of the Palais des Congrès).

Aïda, by Giuseppe Verdi, was the first opera given at the inauguration of the theatre. First inaugurated on June 2, 1901, the entire building was not inaugurated until 31 March 1903, after the completion of the interior decorations of the opera, with the support of French architect Charles Le Cœur and Belgian architect Lucien Woog.

The hall, in Art Nouveau style, has a capacity of 1,482 seats, with a stage measuring 11 x 9 metres in length and 15 metres in depth. It was then the largest hall in France after the Opéra Garnier.

It was decorated by the Polish painter Léon Rudnicki. The vault of the dome is decorated with the faces of artists: Sarah Bernhardt, Gabrielle Réjane, Coquelin, Cléo de Mérode, Jean Mounet-Sully. The ironwork, the three doors, the balustrades and the banisters are by Émile Robert. The masks are by the sculptor Pierre Seguin.

The building was listed as a historic monument on August 13, 1991, specifically for its entrance hall and the large gallery. It was also listed on March 18, 1996, for the theater hall, including the galleries and vestibule, the rooms and the ambulatories of the old games room. This monument is the only “Art Nouveau” style theater in France.

Vichy was known between 1901 and 1964 as the “summer capital of music”. By the 1930s, more than 90 performances were given each summer. In July 1940, after the French defeat at the start of the Second World War, the Pétain government moved to Vichy, and the opera house was the scene of the vote of full powers to Marshal Pétain by the parliamentarians, inaugurating the collaborationist regime.

In the second half of the 20th century, in addition to the decline of hydrotherapy and, consequently, visitor numbers, the activity of the opera would also decline, with the disappearance of resident orchestras and troupes.

A fire ravaged the opera in 1986. The city of Vichy acquired the building the following year and restored it in 1995, taking advantage of the work to install heating in the opera and thus allow a winter season to open.

== Gallery ==
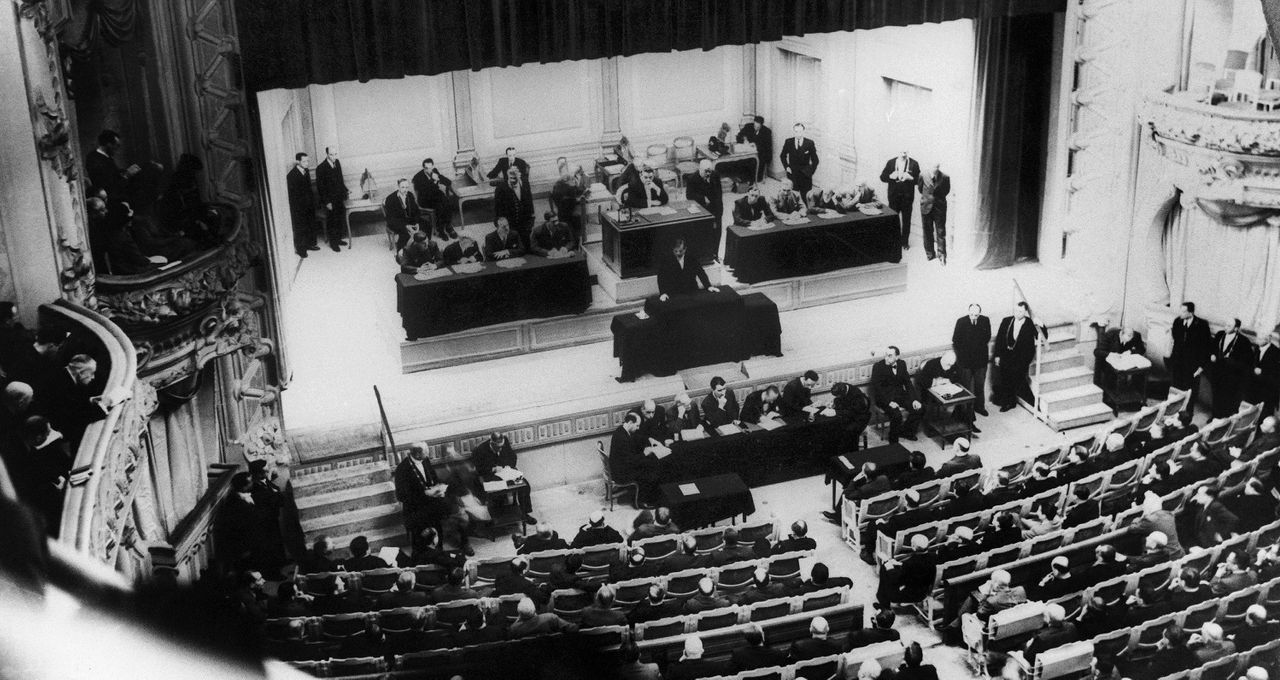
National assembly of 10 June 1940

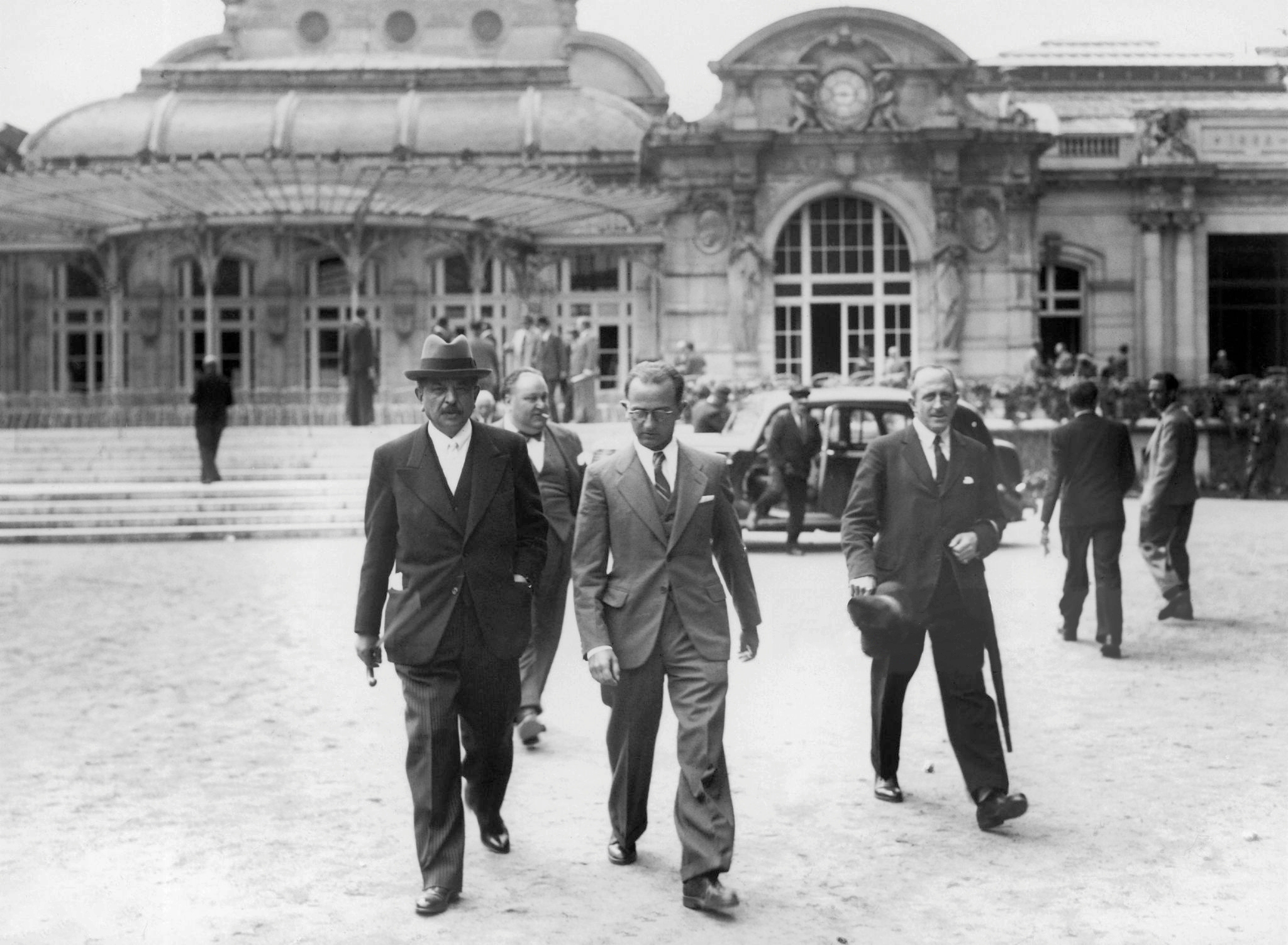
Pierre Laval outside the building on the same date

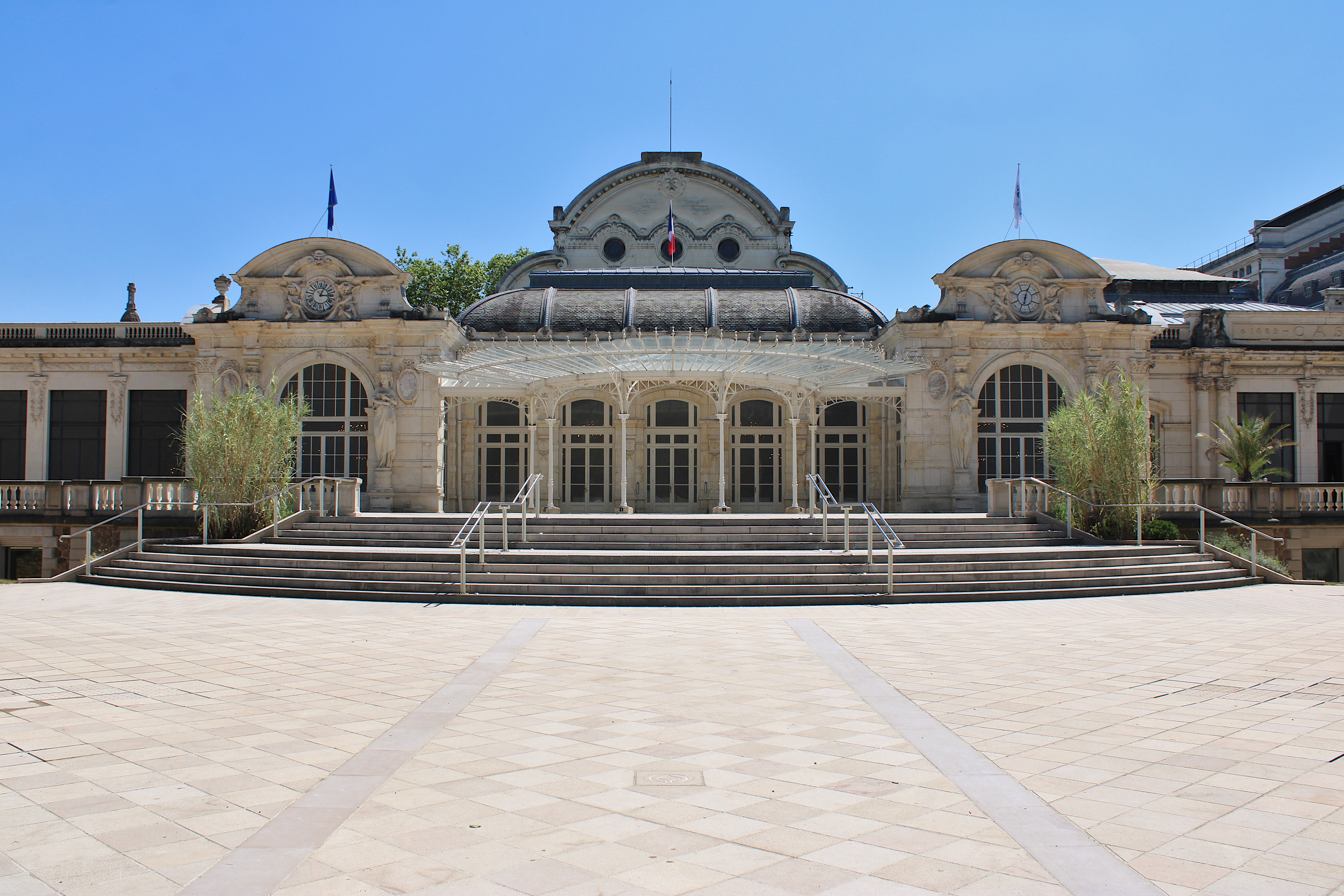
The building's façade in 2025

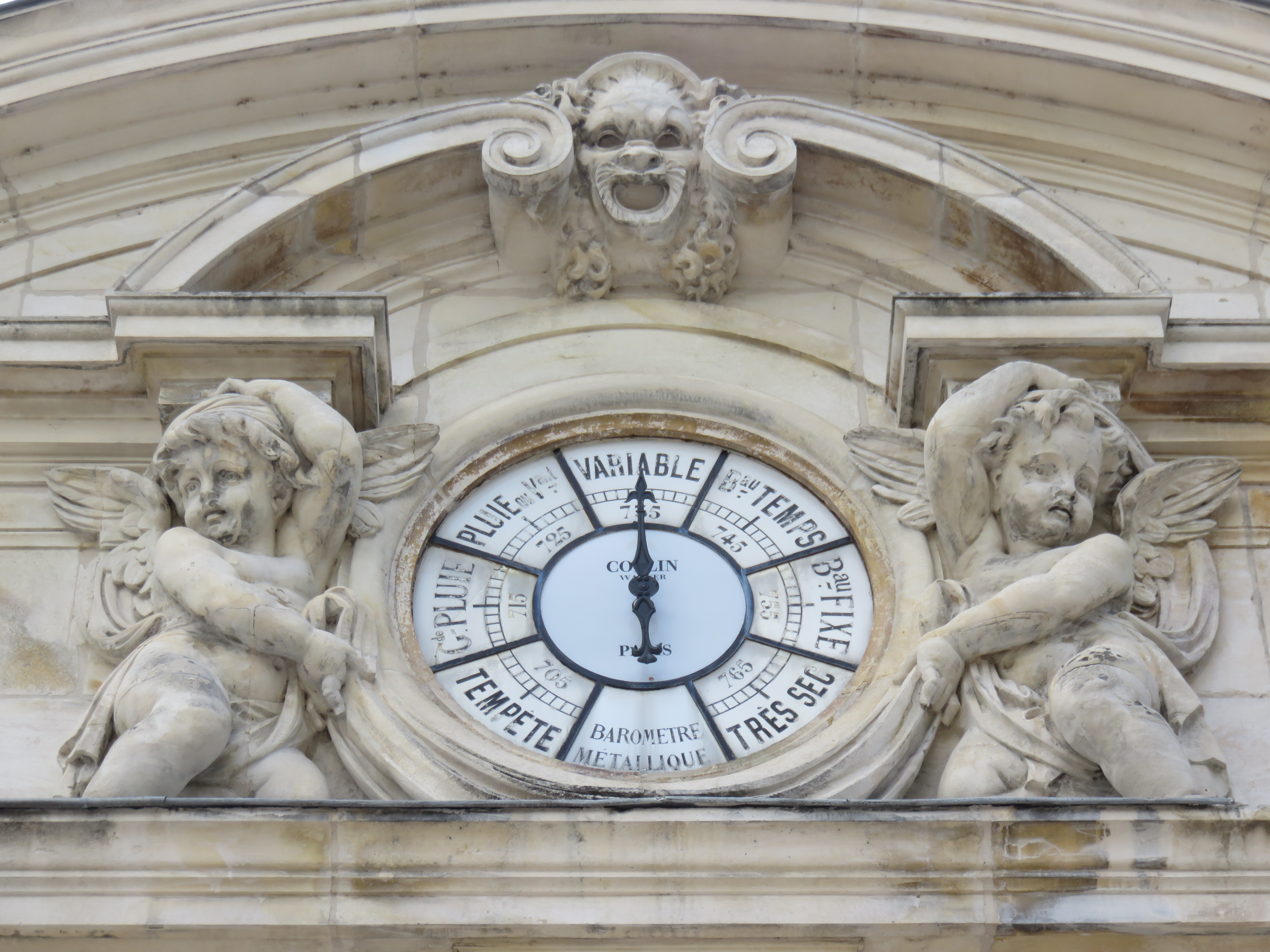
The building's barometer in 2019

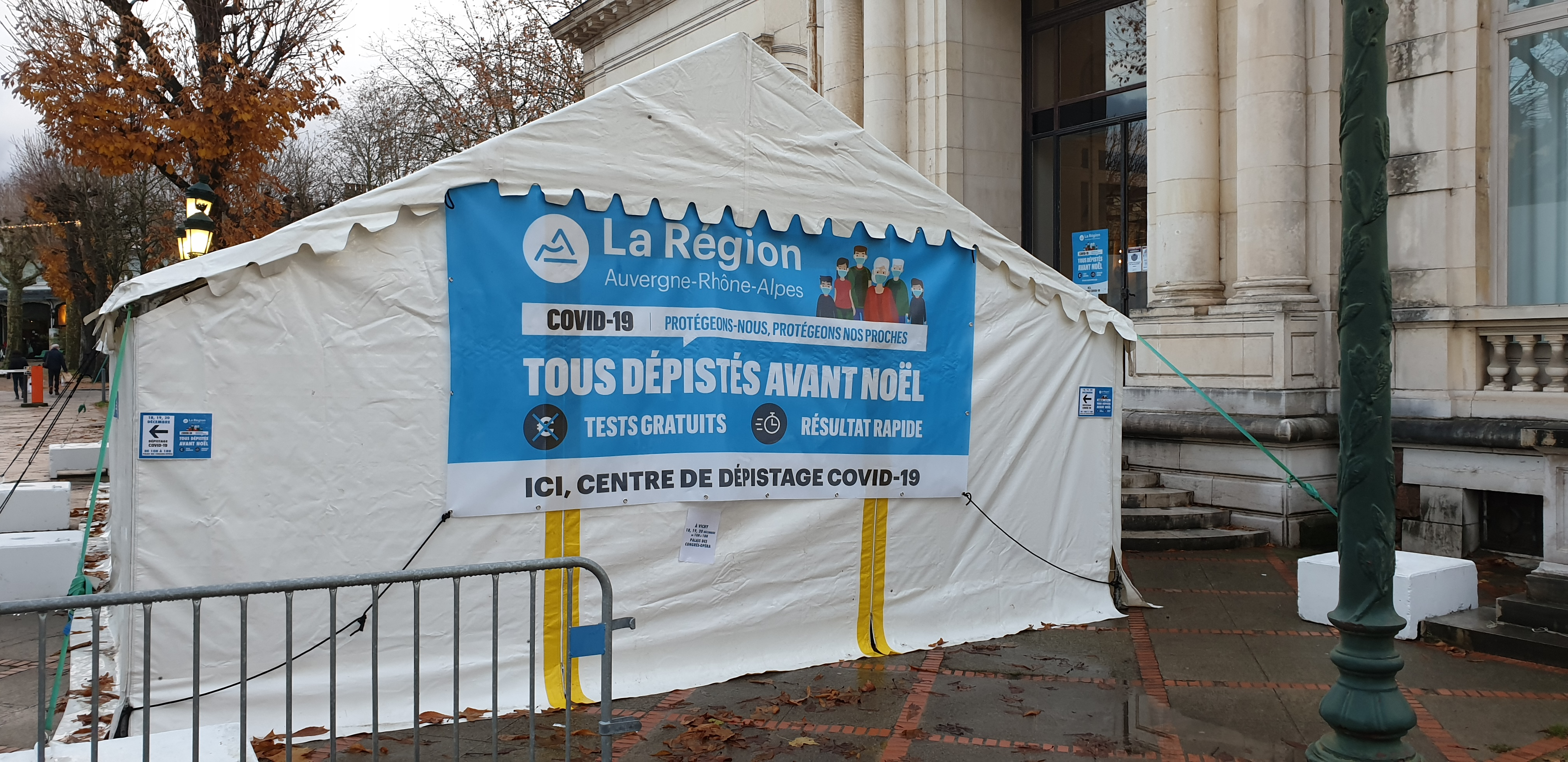
COVID-19 screening outside the building in 2020

== See also ==
- List of opera houses in France
- Government of Vichy France
