= Hôtel de Ville, Vichy =

Town hall in Vichy, France

Hôtel de Ville
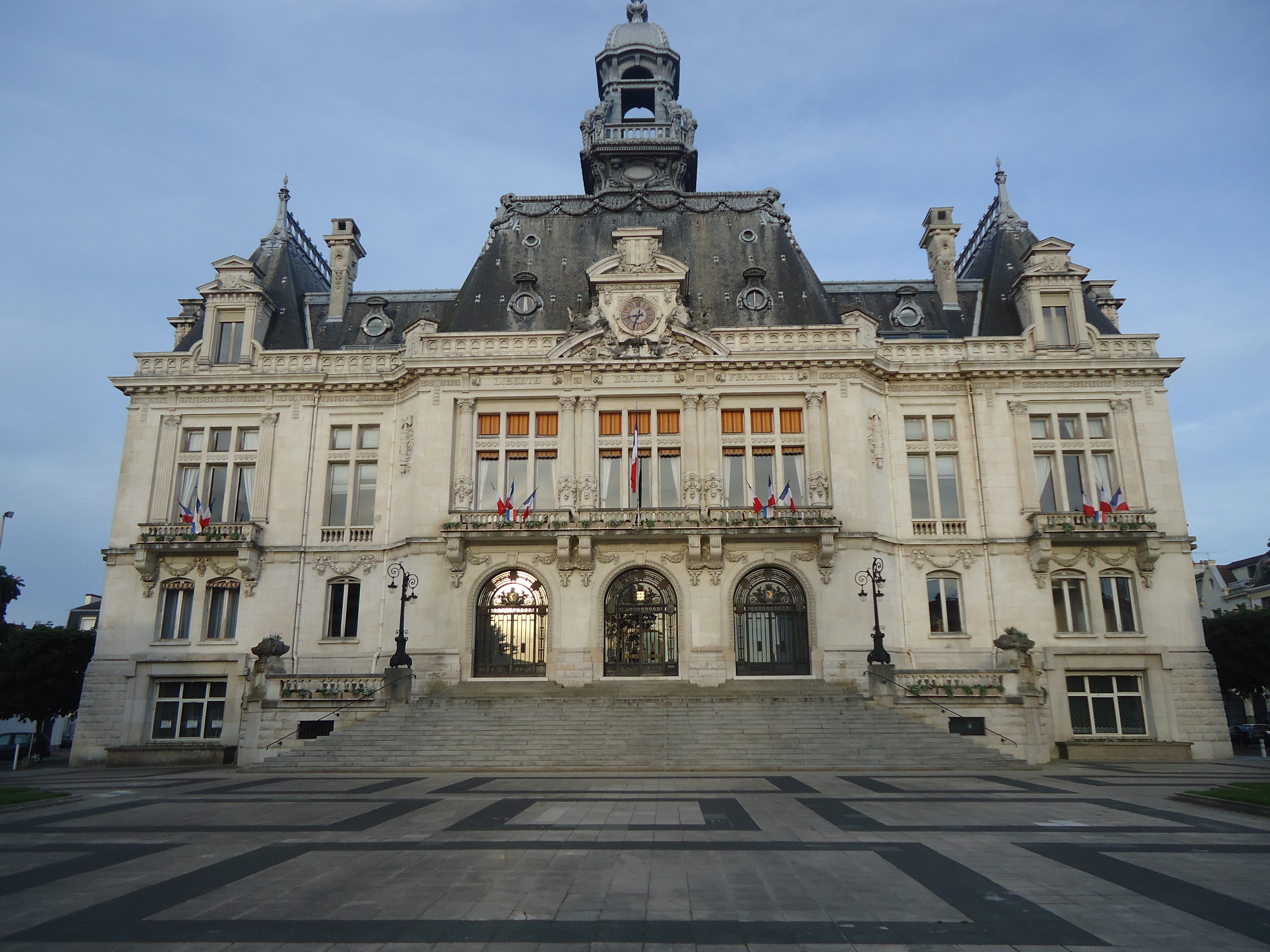
- The main frontage of the Hôtel de Ville in June 2013

General information
- Type: City hall
- Architectural style: Neoclassical style
- Location: Vichy, France
- Coordinates: 46.1244°N 3.4283°E
- Completed: 1925

Height
- Height: 47 metres (154 ft)

Design and construction
- Architects: Antoine Chanet and Jean Liogier

Monument historique
- Official name: Hôtel de ville
- Type: Inscrit
- Designated: 1990
- Reference no.: PA00093396

The Hôtel de Ville (French pronunciation: [otɛl də vil], City Hall) is a municipal building in Vichy, Allier, in central France, standing on Place de l'Hôtel de Ville. It was designated a monument historique by the French government in 1990.

== History ==
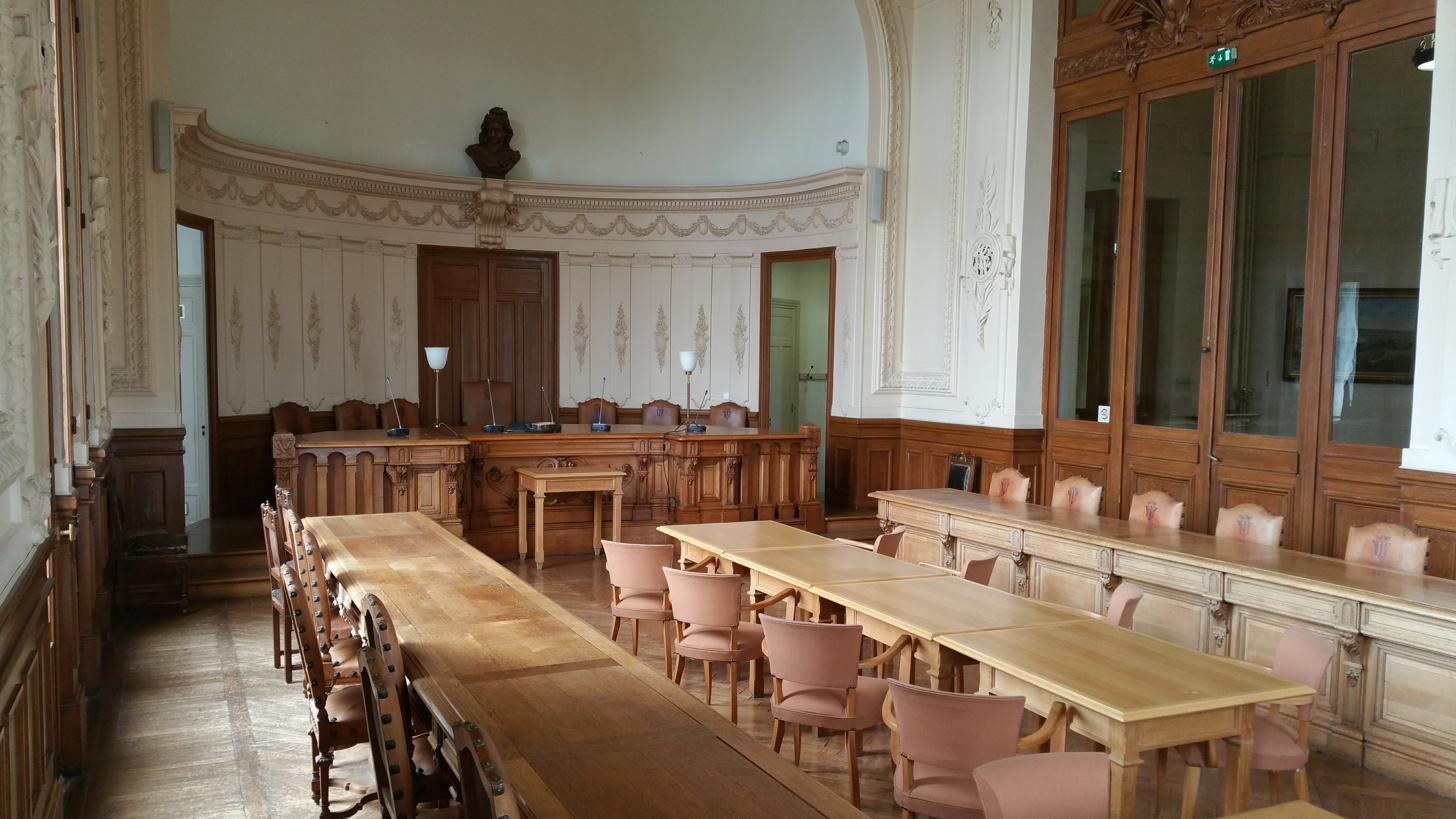
The council chamber

Following the French Revolution, the town council initially established an office in the Maison des Trois Piliers (House of the Three Pillars) at No. 7 Rue d'Allier in 1790. The council subsequently relocated to offices in the Maison du Bailliage (Bailiff's House) on Rue Verrier in 1801, to No. 1 Place de la Source de l'Hôpital in 1822 and to No. 7 Place de Sévigné in 1835.

With encouragement and financial support from the emperor, Napoleon III, the council then moved to a new building on Place du Fatitot (now Square du Général-Leclerc) in the growing spa district of the town in 1865. However, by the early 20th century, this building was considered too far from the centre of town, and it was demolished in 1910 to make way for the Hotel Rühl (now Hotel Radio), which was completed in 1913.

The council then proceeded to commission a new town hall but, in the meantime, moved to temporary accommodation in the Grand Café du Chalet at No. 66 Rue de Paris. The site they selected for the current building, the seventh town hall, was occupied by the Bourse du Travail (labour exchange). Construction of the new building started in 1913, but progress was delayed by the advent of the First World War. It was designed by Antoine Chanet and his son-in-law, Jean Liogier, in the neoclassical style, built in ashlar stone and was officially opened by the Minister of the Interior, Albert Sarraut, on 23 September 1928.

The design involved a symmetrical main frontage of seven bays facing onto Place de l'Hôtel de Ville. The central section of three bays, which was canted forward, featured a wide flight of steps leading up to three round headed openings with keystones; there were three French doors on the first floor, fronted by a balustraded balcony and flanked by Ionic order columns supporting an entablature, a cornice and a parapet. The outer bays were fenestrated in a similar style. Above the central bay, there was a pediment containing a clock. Behind the pediment, there was a steep roof surmounted by a square lantern, which was adorned with gargoyles depicting salmon. The total height of the building to the top of the lantern was 47 metres (154 ft). Internally, the principal rooms were the Salle des Mariages (wedding room), the Salle du Conseil (council chamber), and the Salon d'honneur (hall of honour).

In the late 1920s, a local art collector, Eugène Lambert, donated a collection of works of art for the town hall including a section of a painting entitled "La Bataille de Champigny" by Alphonse de Neuville and Édouard Detaille depicting a scene from the Battle of Champigny during the Franco-Prussian War of 1870.

During the Second World War, part of the ground floor was occupied by the police station: it was here that the German SS officer, Hugo Geissler, arrested a member of the French Resistance, Marc Juge, in January 1944. Juge was subsequently tortured, court-martialled and executed.
