= Canton of Vichy-1 =

Coordinates: 46.13°N 3.42°E

Vichy-1
- Canton
- Location of the canton of Vichy-1 in the Allier department.
- Country: France
- Region: Auvergne-Rhône-Alpes
- Department: Allier
- No. of communes: {{{nbcomm}}}
- Established: 22 March 2015

Government
  - Representatives (2021–2028): Jean Almazan; Élisabeth Cuisset
- Population (2019): 18,838
- INSEE code: 03 17

The canton of Vichy-1 is an administrative division of the Allier department, in central France. It was created at the French canton reorganisation which came into effect in March 2015. Its seat is in Vichy.

== Composition ==
List of communes of the canton of Vichy-1 on 1 January 2022
Commune	INSEE code	Intercommunality	Area (km^{2})	Population (2019)	Density (per km^{2})
Vichy (seat)	03310	CA Vichy Communauté	5.85	12,417 (part) 24,980 (commune)	4,270
Charmeil	03060	CA Vichy Communauté	7.40	1,030	139
Saint-Germain-des-Fossés	03236	CA Vichy Communauté	8.30	3,654	440
Saint-Rémy-en-Rollat	03258	CA Vichy Communauté	20.84	1,737	83
Canton of Vichy-1	03 17			18,838	

=== Geographic boundaries ===
The geography of the canton of Vichy-1 is composed of:

- Three communes in their entirety: Charmeil, Saint-Germain-des-Fossés, and Saint-Rémy-en-Rollat.
- The part of the commune of Vichy situated to the north of line defined by the axis of the roads and boundaries as follows: from the territorial limit of the municipality of Cusset, allée Mesdames, rue d'Alsace, rue du Champ-de-Foire, place Jean-Epinat (west side), boulevard de la Mutualité, place Pierre-Victor-Léger, rue du 11-Novembre, rue Beauparlant, rue de Paris, rue Lucas, avenue du Général-Dwight-Eisenhower, rue du Parc, rue du Casino, boulevard de Russie, boulevard des Etats-Unis, its extension in a straight line from rue de Belgique to the edge of the Allier.
