= Vichy — Charmeil Airport =

Vichy – Charmeil Airport Aéroport de Vichy - Charmeil
- IATA: VHY; ICAO: LFLV

Summary
- Airport type: Public
- Operator: Mairie de Vichy
- Serves: Vichy, France
- Location: Charmeil
- Elevation AMSL: 817 ft / 249 m
- Coordinates: 46°10′18″N 003°24′15″E

Map
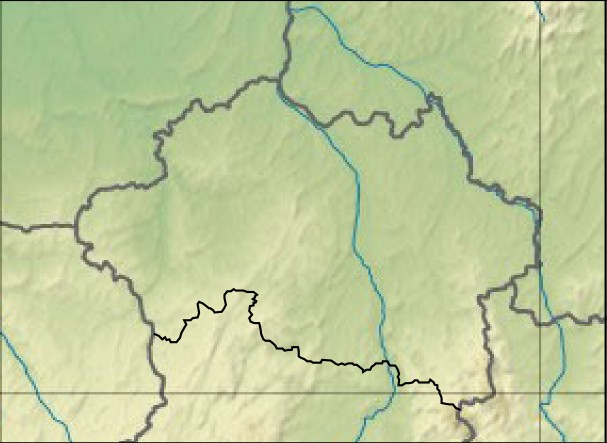
- Location of airport in Allier department Location of Allier department in France

Runways
Direction	Length		Surface
Direction	m	ft	Surface
01/19	2,200	7,218	Asphalt
- Source: AIP France

Vichy – Charmeil Airport (French: Aéroport de Vichy - Charmeil) (IATA: VHY, ICAO: LFLV) is an airport located in Charmeil, 5 km (3 NM) north-northwest of Vichy, both communes in the Allier department of the Auvergne region in central France.

== Facilities ==
The airport resides at an elevation of 817 feet (249 m) above mean sea level. It has one runway designated 01/19 with an asphalt surface measuring 2,200 by 45 metres (7,218 ft × 148 ft).
