= Saint-Rémy-en-Rollat =

- Commune
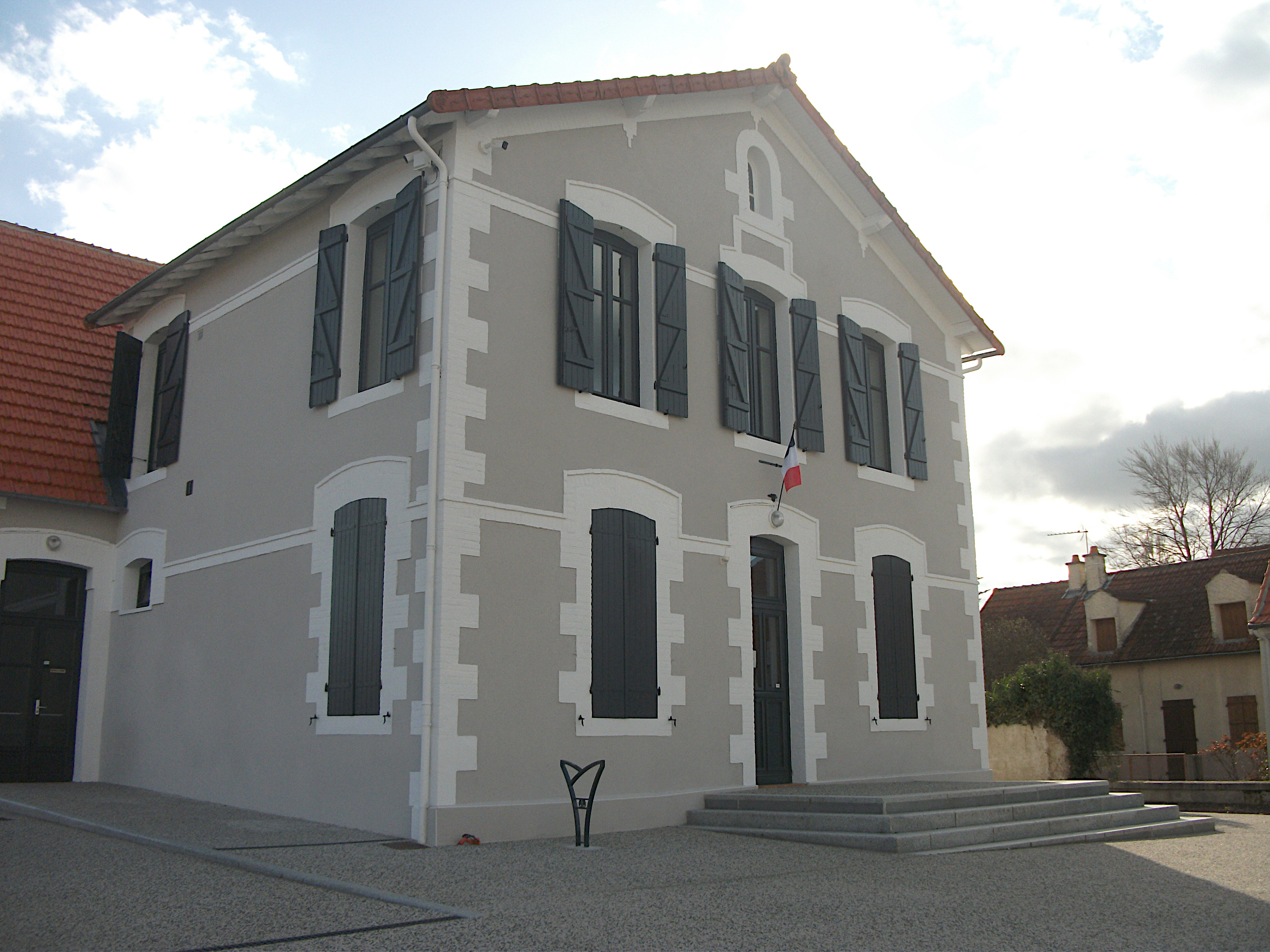
- Town hall in 2020.

- Coat of arms
- Location of Saint-Rémy-en-Rollat
- Location within France Location within Auvergne-Rhône-Alpes
- Coordinates: 46°11′03″N 3°23′31″E
- Country: France
- Region: Auvergne-Rhône-Alpes
- Department: Allier
- Arrondissement: Vichy
- Canton: Vichy-1
- Intercommunality: CA Vichy Communauté

Government
  - Mayor (2026–32): Alain Dumont
- Area^{1}: 20.84 km^{2} (8.05 sq mi)
- Elevation: 262 m (860 ft)
- Highest elevation: 333 m (1,093 ft)
- Lowest elevation: 239 m (784 ft)
- Population (2023): 1,774
  - Density: 85.12/km^{2} (220.5/sq mi)
- Time zone: UTC+01:00 (CET)
  - Summer (DST): UTC+02:00 (CEST)
- INSEE/Postal code: 03258 /03110
- ^{1} French Land Register data, which excludes lakes, ponds, glaciers > 1 km^{2} (0.386 sq mi or 247 acres) and river estuaries.

Saint-Rémy-en-Rollat is a commune in the Allier department in Auvergne-Rhône-Alpes in central France.

== Population ==
Historical population
Year	Pop.	±% p.a.
1968	985	—
1975	1,078	+1.30%
1982	1,265	+2.31%
1990	1,407	+1.34%
1999	1,455	+0.37%
2007	1,583	+1.06%
2012	1,645	+0.77%
2017	1,706	+0.73%
2023	1,774	+0.65%
Source: INSEE

== See also ==
- Communes of the Allier department
