= Compagnie de Vichy =

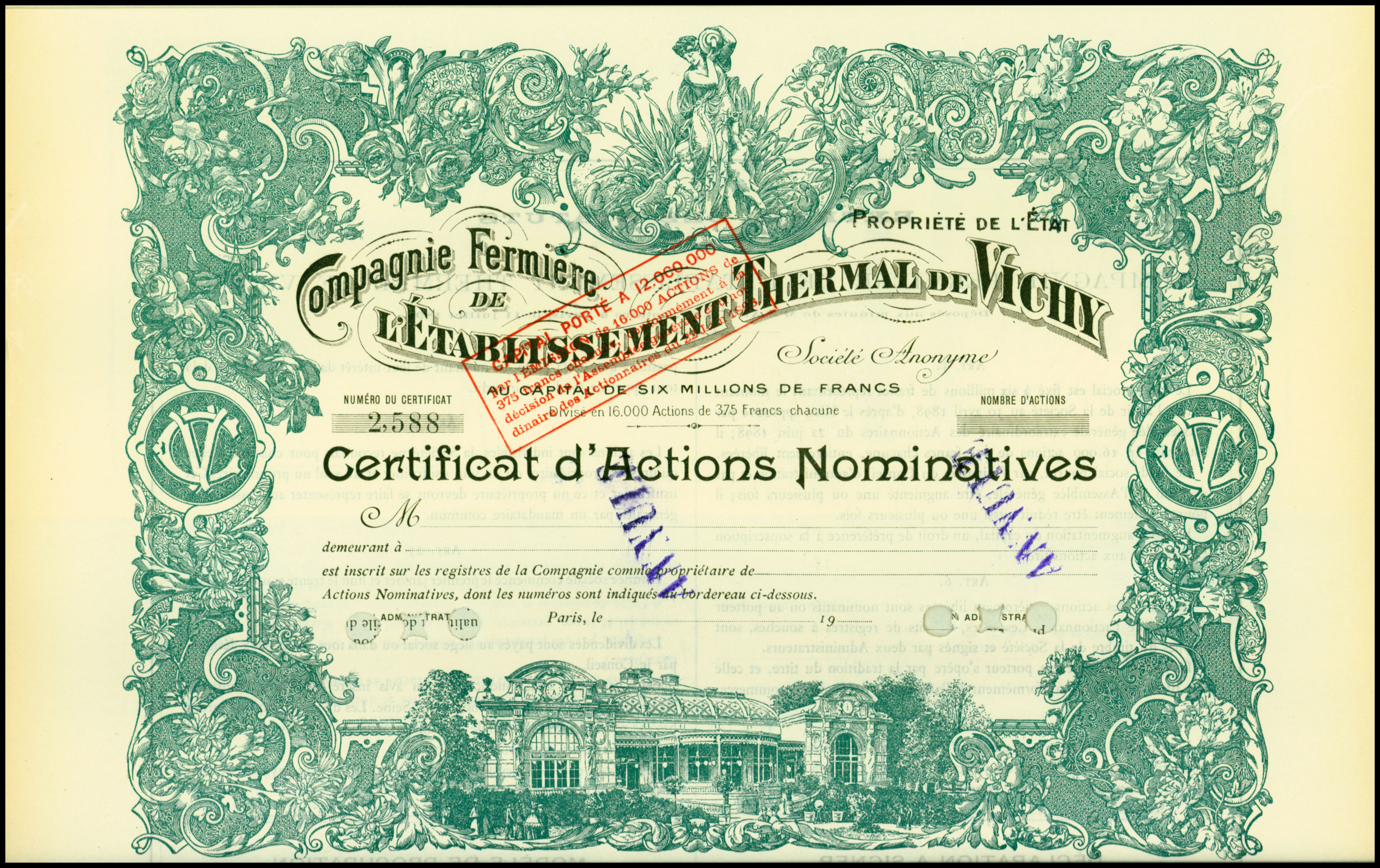
Share of the Compagnie Fermière de l'établissement thermal de Vichy, issued 11. July 1898, blank form

The Compagnie de Vichy (Compagnie Fermière de l'établissement thermal de Vichy) is a French company active in the Hydrotherapy, hotel and bottled water business. It is based in Vichy, France.

== History ==
The Compagnie de Vichy was created in the middle of the 19th century, and is therefore one of the oldest companies in France:

- 1853: Napoléon III gives the operation of the thermal baths to the company Lebobe, Callou et Cie.
- 1862: the company Lebobe, Callou et Cie is turned into a société anonyme under the name of Compagnie Fermière de l'Établissement Thermal de Vichy.
- Until 1954: the company is headed by its founders or by their descendants, notably the Callou family.
- 1954: the company becomes a subsidiary of Brasserie et Glacières de l'Indochine.
- 1968: the company becomes a subsidiary of the Perrier group.
- 1992: the company becomes a subsidiary of the Castel group.
- 2005: Mr. Jérôme Phelipeau becomes majority shareholder of the company.

== The Compagnie de Vichy today ==
The company operates a concession from the French state until December 31, 2030 encompassing buildings in Vichy (France) and its surroundings, as well as 11 thermal springs including Vichy Célestins. Outside of the scope of the concession, the company also operates the hotel part of the thermal activity, with the hotels Ibis Vichy 139 rooms, Mercure Vichy Thermalia 128 rooms and VICHY CÉLESTINS Spa Hôtel, as well as the Vichy Thermal Spa les Célestins. With around 300 employees, the Compagnie de Vichy is the largest private employer of Vichy.

== Licences ==
The company also licences the Vichy Pastilles to Carambar & Co, and has a partnership with the company Cosmétique Active Internationale owned by L'Oréal who produces and distributes Vichy Laboratoires.

== International development ==
The Compagnie de Vichy created Vichy Spa International, a subsidiary dedicated to its international development. Capitalizing on its French experience, it is currently developing spas outside France under the brand Vichy Célestins Spa Hotel & Resort.
