= Limagne Graben =

The Limagne graben is a graben structure that formed during the Eocene as part of the European Cenozoic Rift System. It forms the Limagne plain in the Massif Central and is filled with up to 2 kilometers of sediment.

== Development of the graben ==
The Limagne graben formed from the Eocene to the Oligocene as the part of the European Cenozoic Rift System (ECRS) which extends offshore as the Gulf of Lions and Valencian trough. The ECRS also includes the Upper Rhine graben, Rhône graben, Saône graben, Lower Rhine Embayment and Leine graben as well as the Eger graben in the Bohemian Massif.

The Limagne graben is part of the larger Limagne subsidence area, which extends southward from the Burgundy rift-rift transform into the Massif Central with a large number of small grabens. Thermal doming and volcanic activity in the Miocene uplifted the Massif Central, effectively ending subsidence and halting the build of lake sediments in the graben.
