= Saint-Germain-des-Fossés =

- Commune
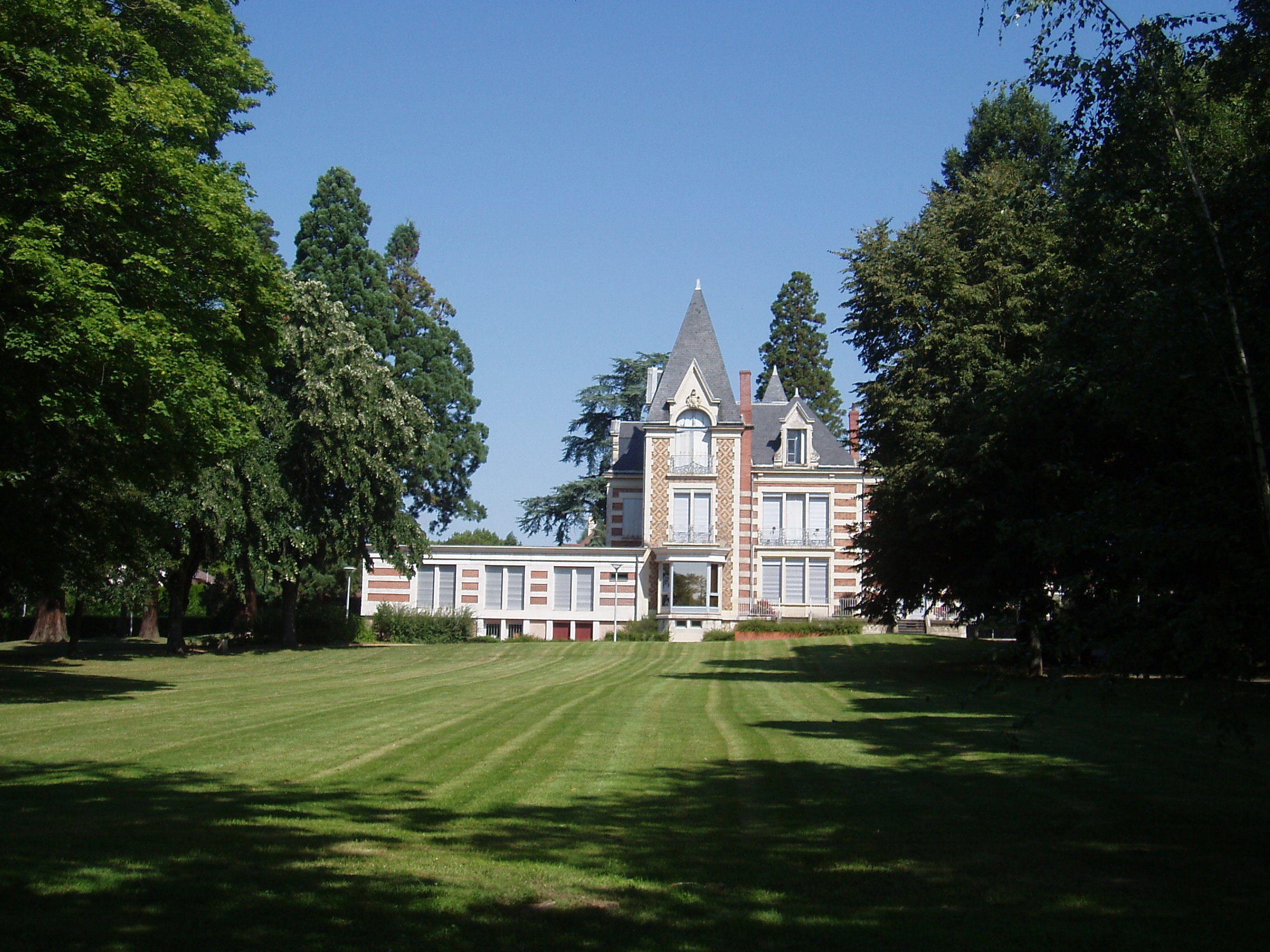
- Town hall

- Coat of arms
- Location of Saint-Germain-des-Fossés
- Location within France Location within Auvergne-Rhône-Alpes
- Coordinates: 46°12′27″N 3°26′04″E
- Country: France
- Region: Auvergne-Rhône-Alpes
- Department: Allier
- Arrondissement: Vichy
- Canton: Vichy-1
- Intercommunality: CA Vichy Communauté

Government
  - Mayor (2026–32): Élisabeth Cuisset
- Area^{1}: 8.3 km^{2} (3.2 sq mi)
- Elevation: 255 m (837 ft)
- Highest elevation: 365 m (1,198 ft)
- Lowest elevation: 239 m (784 ft)
- Population (2023): 3,579
  - Density: 430/km^{2} (1,100/sq mi)
- Time zone: UTC+01:00 (CET)
  - Summer (DST): UTC+02:00 (CEST)
- INSEE/Postal code: 03236 /03260
- ^{1} French Land Register data, which excludes lakes, ponds, glaciers > 1 km^{2} (0.386 sq mi or 247 acres) and river estuaries.

Saint-Germain-des-Fossés (French pronunciation: [sɛ̃ ʒɛʁmɛ̃ de fose]; Occitan: Sent German daus Fossats) is a commune in the Allier department in Auvergne-Rhône-Alpes in central France. Saint-Germain-des-Fossés station has rail connections to Lyon, Nevers and Clermont-Ferrand.

== Population ==
Historical population

| Year | Pop. | ±% p.a. |
|---|---|---|
| 1793 | 1,024 | — |
| 1800 | 1,013 | −0.15% |
| 1806 | 950 | −1.06% |
| 1821 | 1,083 | +0.88% |
| 1831 | 966 | −1.14% |
| 1836 | 1,054 | +1.76% |
| 1841 | 1,057 | +0.06% |
| 1846 | 1,029 | −0.54% |
| 1851 | 1,004 | −0.49% |
| 1856 | 1,327 | +5.74% |
| 1861 | 1,526 | +2.83% |
| 1866 | 1,867 | +4.12% |
| 1872 | 1,965 | +0.86% |
| 1876 | 1,995 | +0.38% |
| 1881 | 2,122 | +1.24% |
| 1886 | 2,312 | +1.73% |
| 1891 | 2,167 | −1.29% |
| 1896 | 2,321 | +1.38% |
| 1901 | 2,503 | +1.52% |

| Year | Pop. | ±% p.a. |
|---|---|---|
| 1906 | 2,688 | +1.44% |
| 1911 | 2,736 | +0.35% |
| 1921 | 3,012 | +0.97% |
| 1926 | 3,135 | +0.80% |
| 1931 | 3,562 | +2.59% |
| 1936 | 3,473 | −0.50% |
| 1946 | 3,610 | +0.39% |
| 1954 | 3,482 | −0.45% |
| 1962 | 3,526 | +0.16% |
| 1968 | 3,529 | +0.01% |
| 1975 | 3,771 | +0.95% |
| 1982 | 3,609 | −0.63% |
| 1990 | 3,727 | +0.40% |
| 1999 | 3,686 | −0.12% |
| 2007 | 3,672 | −0.05% |
| 2012 | 3,694 | +0.12% |
| 2017 | 3,656 | −0.21% |
| 2023 | 3,579 | −0.35% |

Source: EHESS and INSEE (1968-2023)

== See also ==
- Communes of the Allier department
