= Canton of Lurcy-Lévis =

Coordinates: 46°43′50″N 2°56′21″E

Lurcy-Lévis
- Former canton
- Interactive map of Lurcy-Lévis
- Country: France
- Region: Auvergne-Rhône-Alpes
- Department: Allier
- No. of communes: {{{nbcomm}}}
- Disbanded: 2015
- Area: 293.17 km^{2} (113.19 sq mi)
- Population (2012): 4,651
  - Density: 15.86/km^{2} (41.09/sq mi)

The canton of Lurcy-Lévis is a former administrative division in central France. It was disbanded following the French canton reorganisation which came into effect in March 2015. It consisted of 9 communes, which joined the canton of Bourbon-l'Archambault in 2015. It had 4,651 inhabitants (2012).

The canton comprised the following communes:

- Château-sur-Allier
- Couleuvre
- Couzon
- Limoise
- Lurcy-Lévis
- Neure
- Pouzy-Mésangy
- Saint-Léopardin-d'Augy
- Le Veurdre

== Demographics ==
Historical population Canton of Lurcy-Lévis
Year	1962	1968	1975	1982	1990	1999
Pop.	6,240	6,530	5,806	5,459	4,971	4,843
±%	—	+4.6%	−11.1%	−6.0%	−8.9%	−2.6%
From the year 1962 on: No double counting – residents of multiple communes (e.g. students and military personnel) are counted only once. Source: INSEE

== See also ==
- Cantons of the Allier department
