= Ainay-le-Château =

- Commune
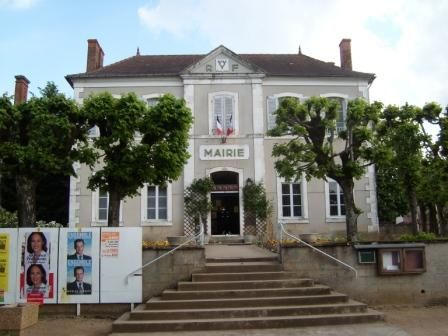
- Town hall

- Coat of arms
- Location of Ainay-le-Château
- Location within France Location within Auvergne-Rhône-Alpes
- Coordinates: 46°42′43″N 2°41′36″E
- Country: France
- Region: Auvergne-Rhône-Alpes
- Department: Allier
- Arrondissement: Montluçon
- Canton: Bourbon-l'Archambault
- Intercommunality: CC du Pays de Tronçais

Government
  - Mayor (2026–32): Stéphane Milaveau
- Area^{1}: 24.07 km^{2} (9.29 sq mi)
- Elevation: 208 m (682 ft)
- Highest elevation: 252 m (827 ft)
- Lowest elevation: 184 m (604 ft)
- Population (2023): 989
  - Density: 41.1/km^{2} (106/sq mi)
- Time zone: UTC+01:00 (CET)
  - Summer (DST): UTC+02:00 (CEST)
- INSEE/Postal code: 03003 /03360
- ^{1} French Land Register data, which excludes lakes, ponds, glaciers > 1 km^{2} (0.386 sq mi or 247 acres) and river estuaries.

Ainay-le-Château (French pronunciation: [ɛnɛ l(ə) ʃɑto]) is a commune in the Allier department in the Auvergne-Rhône-Alpes region of central France.

The inhabitants of the commune are known as Castelainaisiens or Castelainaisiennes in French.

== Geography ==
Ainay-le-Château is located some 55 kilometres (34 mi) south-east of Bourges and 50 kilometres (31 mi) south-west of Nevers. The northern border of the commune is the departmental boundary with Cher and the regional boundary with the Centre-Val de Loire region. Access to the commune is by D951 road from Thaumiers in the north which passes through the town and continues south to Cérilly. The D951 from Charenton-du-Cher in the north-west to Bessais-le-Fromental in the north-east passes through the north of the commune. The D28 comes from Braize in the south-west to the town then continues north to join the D951. The D64 goes east from the town to Valigny. There are several country roads in the commune linking the villages and hamlets inside. These include Le Castinerie, Salvert, La Bete, Saint-Benin, Charnoux, La Moullin de la Riviere, and L'Amour.

The town is traversed by the Marmande river, a tributary of the Cher; and the Sologne river, which feeds into the Marmande. The village overlooks the right bank of the Sologne. There are a number of small lakes at the heads of the streams to the east of the town. On the left bank, the suburb of Mandais is covers both sides of the road from Bourges and the border with the department of Cher passes within 300 metres (980 ft) of the bridge.

The commune is bordered by the Forest of Tronçais to the south with a small portion of the forest in the commune called Taillis de Pontcharaud.

== History ==
Ainay-le-Chateau is a medieval town, one of the seventeen Châtelainies of the Dukes of Bourbon. The city was enclosed by walls and a castle stood around the church of Saint-Stephen.

During the French Revolution, the town took the name of Ainay-sur-Sologne.

The former parish and commune of Saint-Benin was reunited with Ainay-le-Château in 1842 and is today a village east of the town. Saint-Benin carried the Charnoux at the time of the French Revolution.

=== Home for people with psychiatric disorders ===
The town is home for a hospital which runs foster homes for the mentally ill. There are many of those foster homes in the commune and in the surrounding ones. Thus, these people are very well accepted, which allows them to live in optimal conditions. Because of this particular, the town has been featured on TF1 in the program Sept à huit (Seven to Eight) on 31 January 2010 (retransmitted on 21 April 2013), as well as in the program la Fabrique de l'Histoire (Fabric of History) on France Culture on 7 December 2010.

== Heraldry ==
Arms of Ainay-le-Château	Blazon: Argent, 3 Palls of sable 2 and 1.

== Administration ==
List of Successive Mayors of Ainay-le-Château

From	To	Name	Party	Position
1614		Charles Perrot		
1935	1935	François Naudin		
1935	1942	Jacques Lablonde		
1959	1971	Brunet		
1971	1989	Jacques Soulat		
1989	1995	Dupre		
1995	2008	Pierre Dumas		
2008	Current	Stéphane Milaveau	DVD	

== Population ==
Historical population
Year	Pop.	±% p.a.
1968	1,613	—
1975	1,552	−0.55%
1982	1,544	−0.07%
1990	1,458	−0.71%
1999	1,165	−2.46%
2007	1,107	−0.64%
2012	1,021	−1.60%
2017	994	−0.53%
2023	989	−0.08%
Source: INSEE

== Economy ==
In February 2010, according to the commercial register, Ainay-le-Château had 76 companies registered in the commune. There are 61 Real estate and other companies with their headquarters in the town.

Most of them engage in craft activities, shops and services nearby. Since 2005 there have been from 2 to 6 new company registrations per year.

Three different bank branches are available in Town: La Banque Postale, the Banque Populaire, and Crédit Agricole Centre France.

A local specialty is goat cheese.

== Culture and heritage ==
=== Civil heritage ===
The commune has two sites that are registered as historical monuments:

- A Public Park
- The Urban area Fortifications (15th century) The fortifications include the Clock Gate and the enclosure with towers and walls.
Fortifications of Ainay-le-Chateau

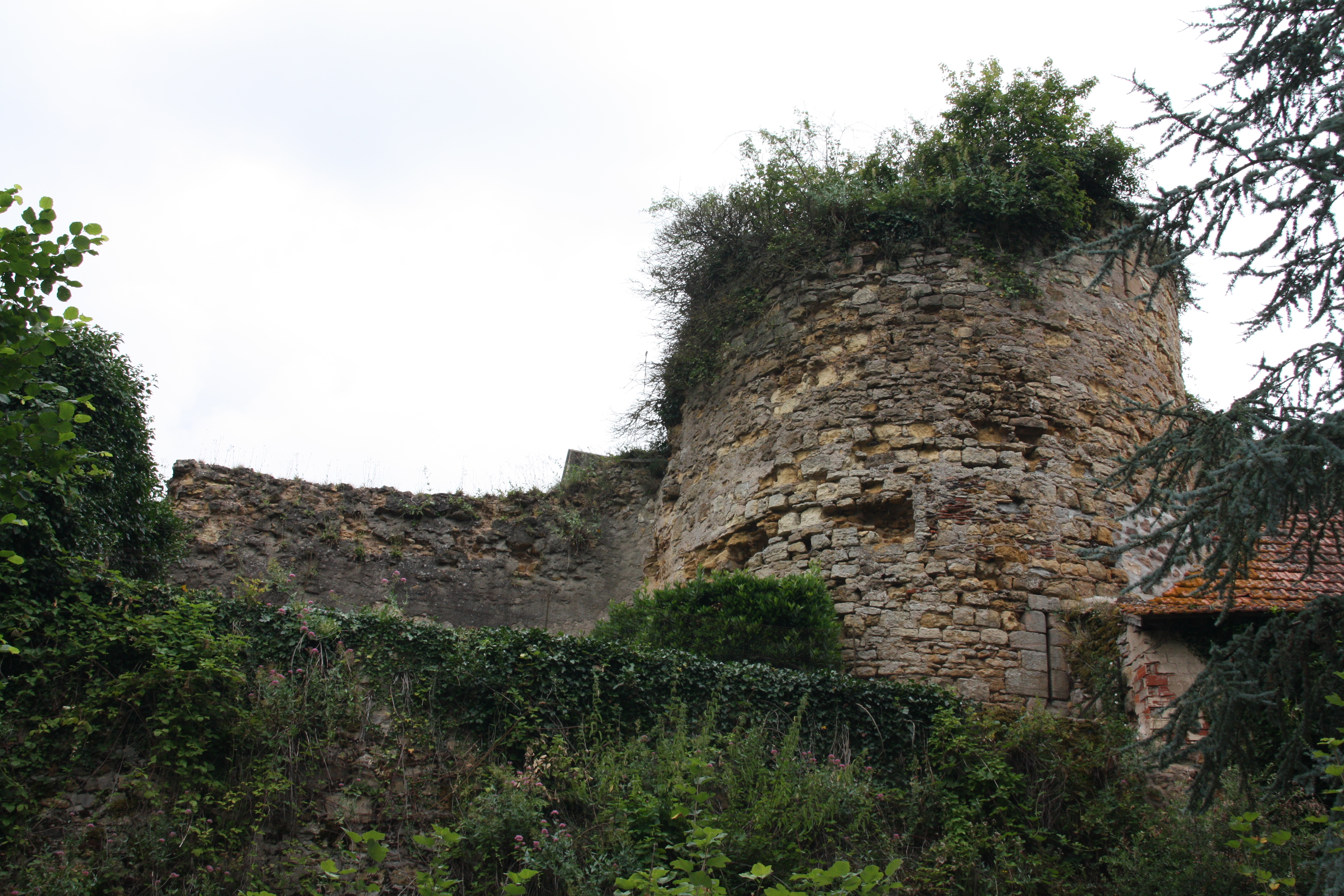

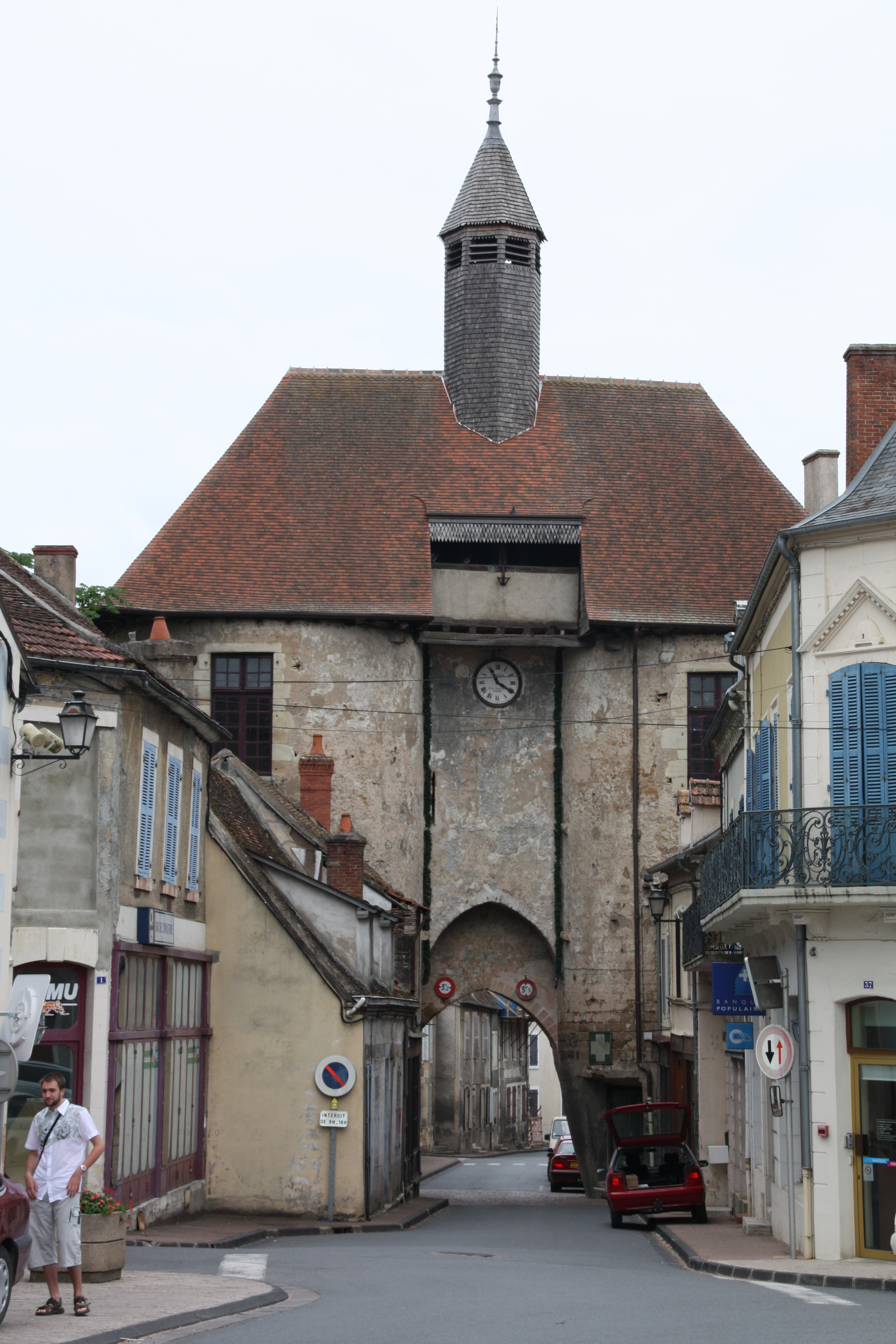

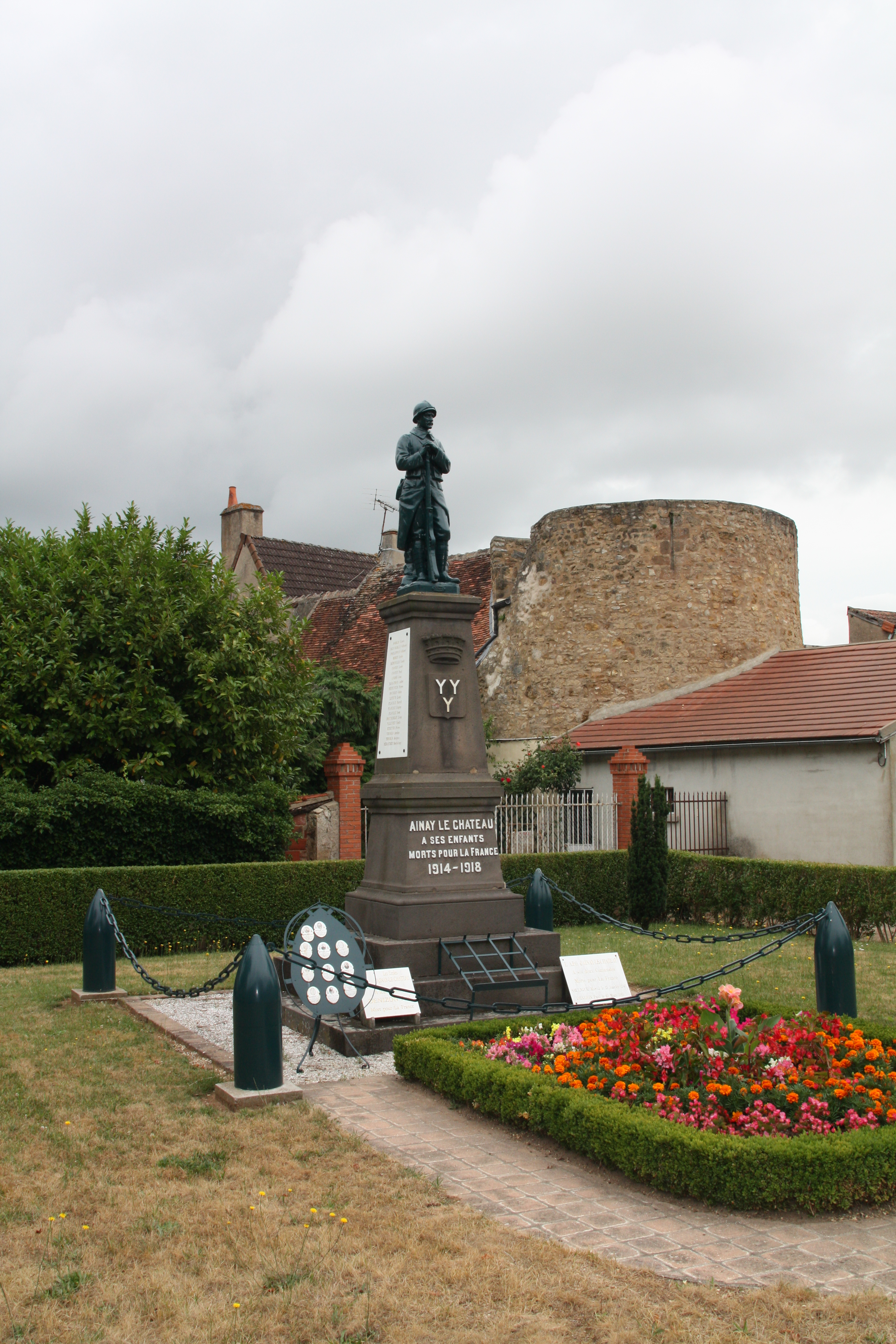

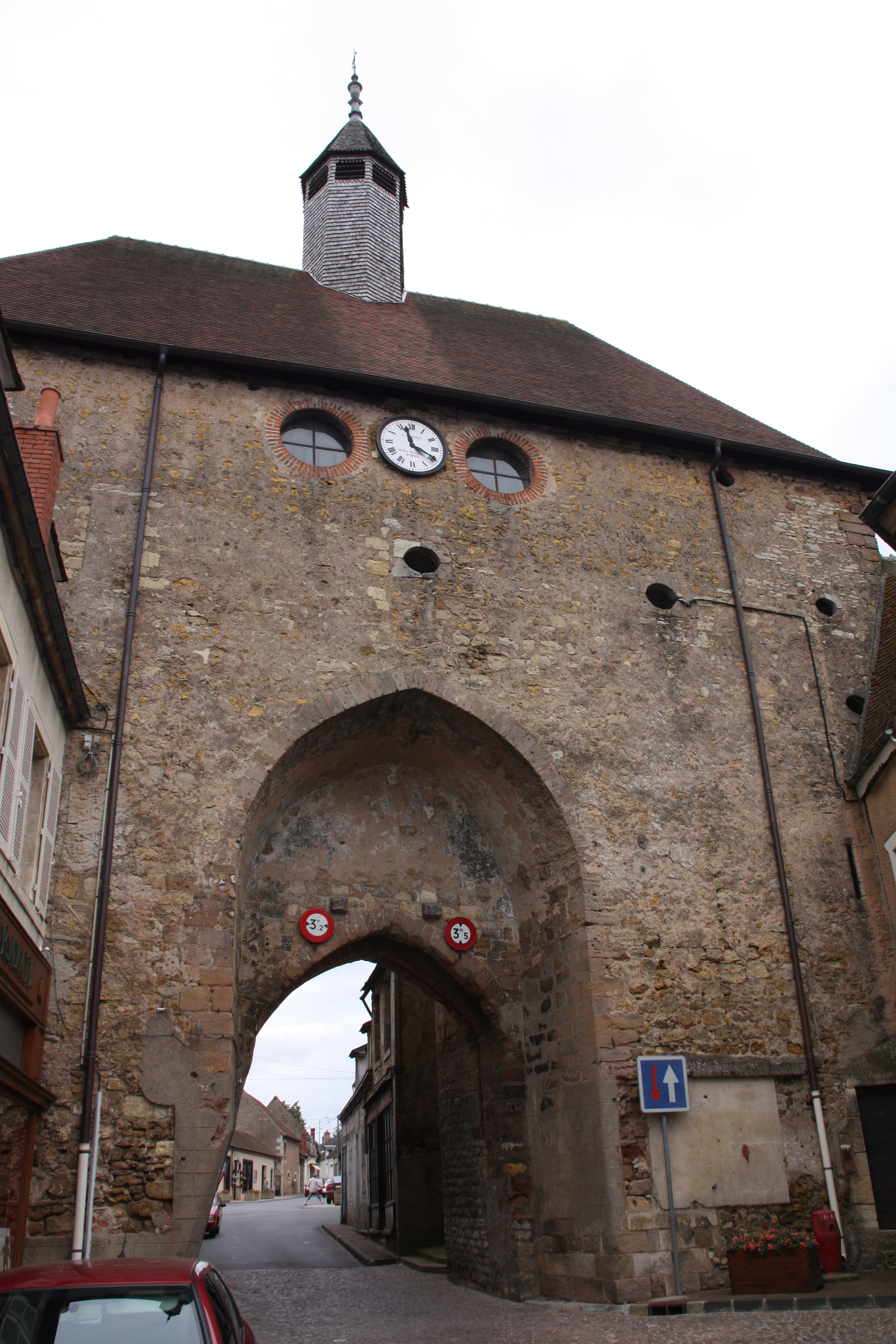

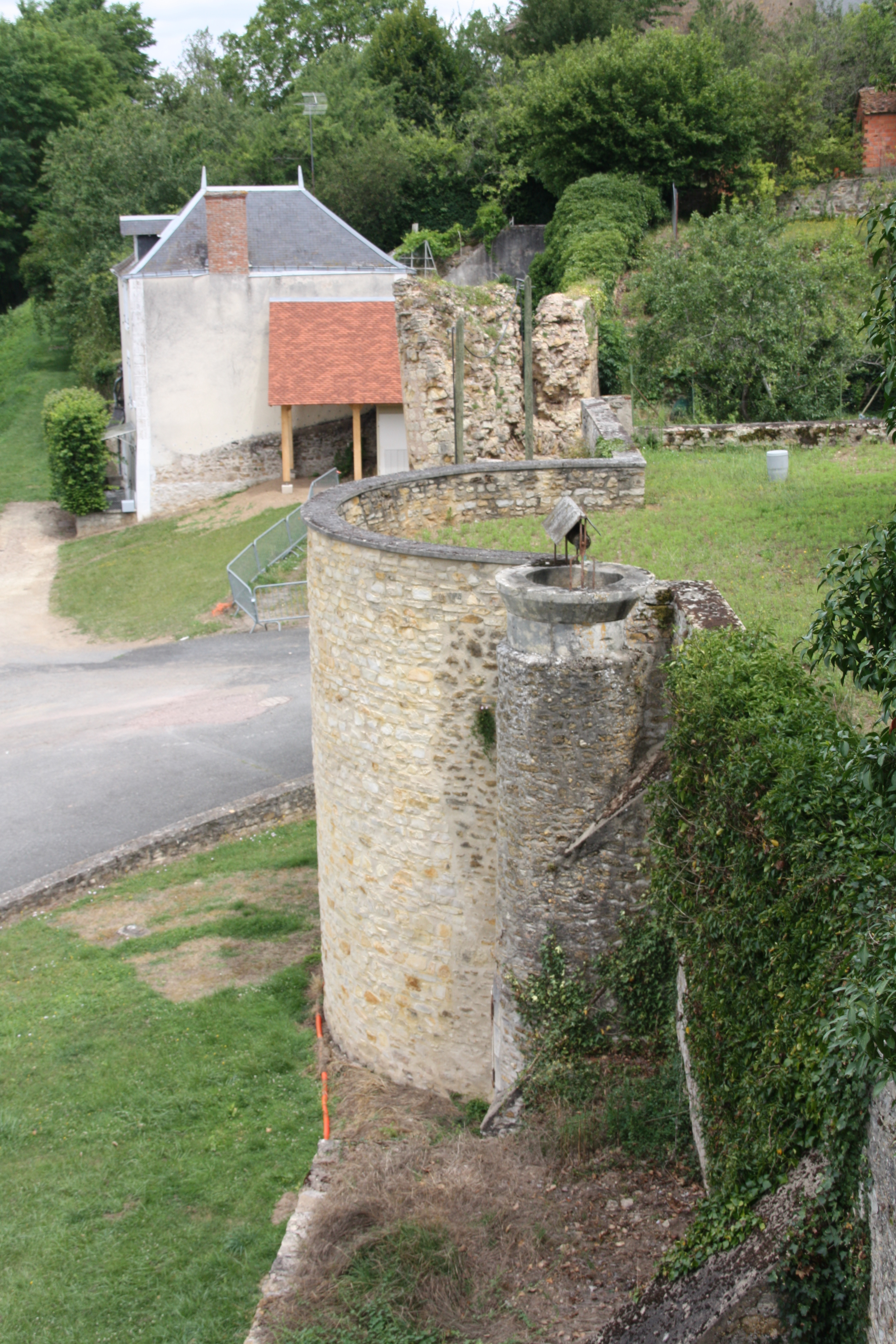

=== Religious heritage ===
- The Church of Saint Etienne (12th century). is registered as an historical monument. The Church has a Renaissance doorway and an old porch from the 12th century. The Church contains many items that are registered as historical objects:
  - A Tombstone (1534)
  - A Tombstone (15th century)
  - A Cross: Christ on the Cross (17th century)
  - A Tabernacle with a canopy (17th century)
  - A Statue: Saint Francis (17th century)
  - A Statue: Virgin and Child (17th century)
  - A Group Sculpture: Virgin of Pity (16th century)
  - A Bas-relief: The House of Lorette (16th century)
- The Chapel of Saint-Roch contains a Statue: Saint Fiacre (17th century) which is registered as an historical object.
Church of Saint Stephen

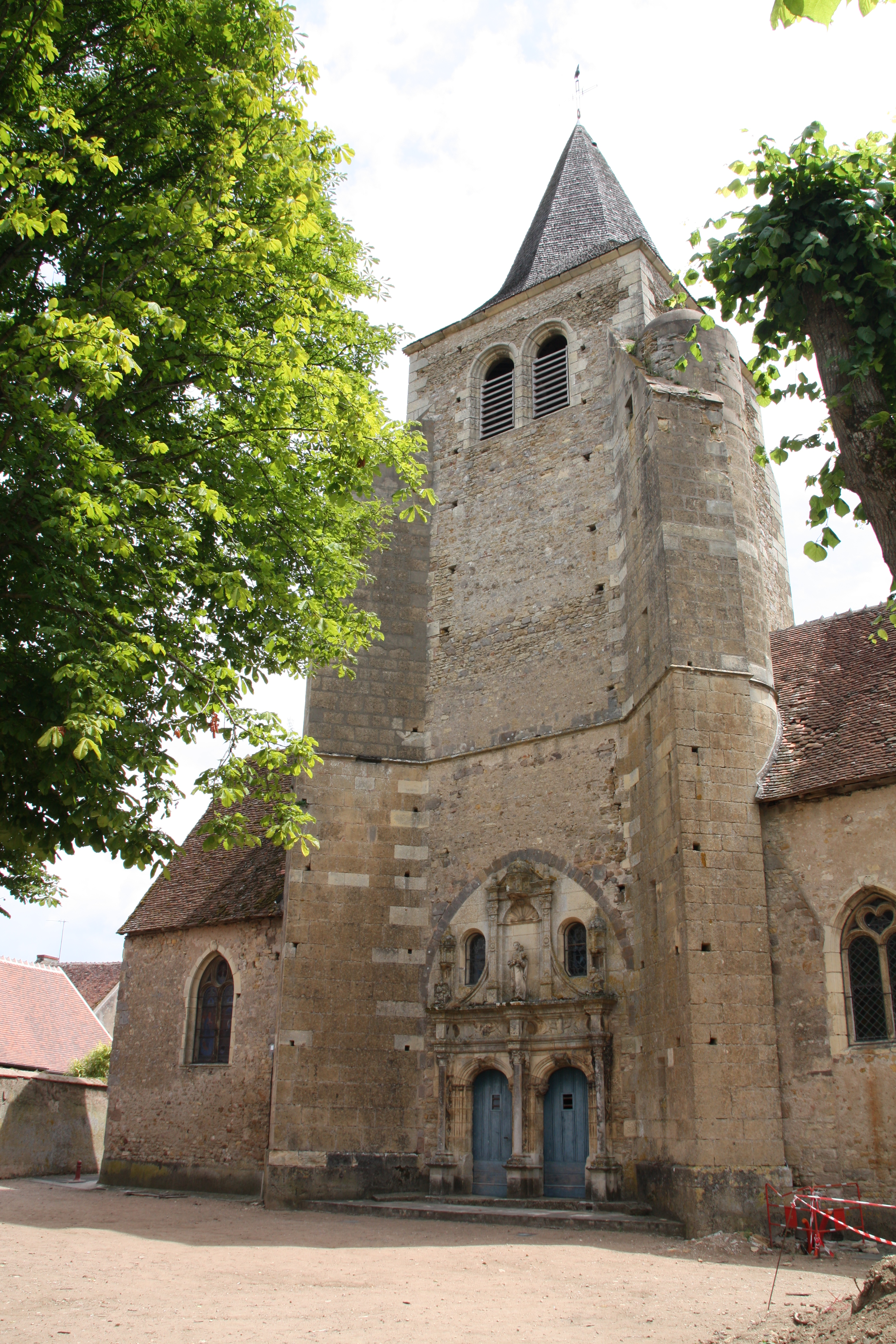
The Church Front

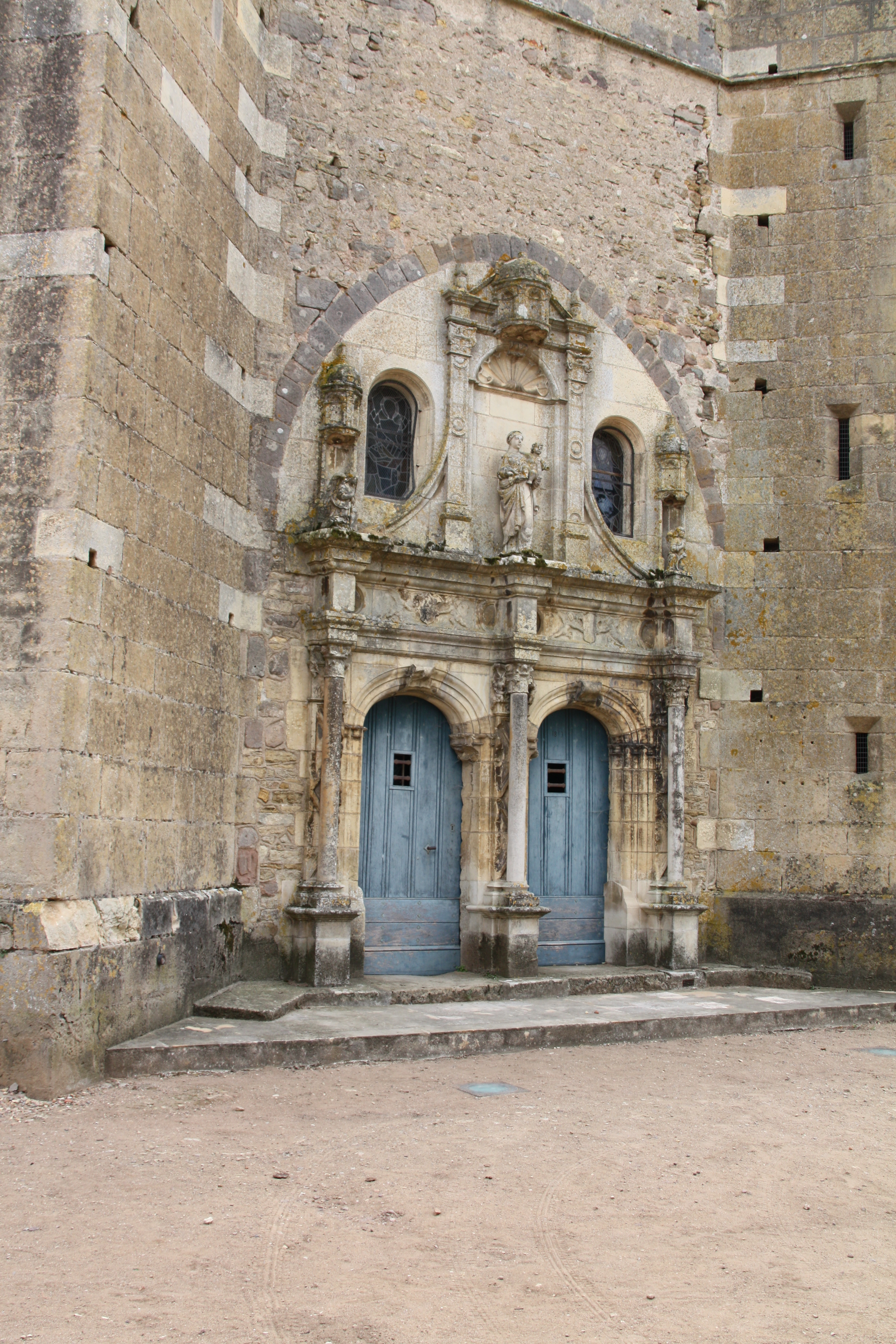
Church entrance

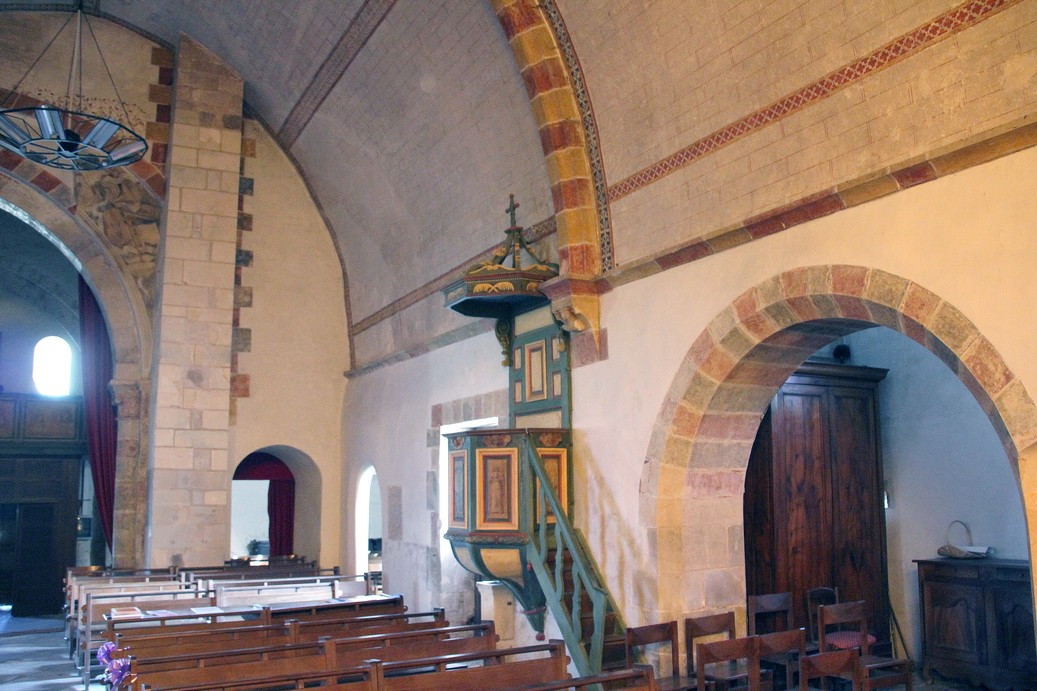
The nave

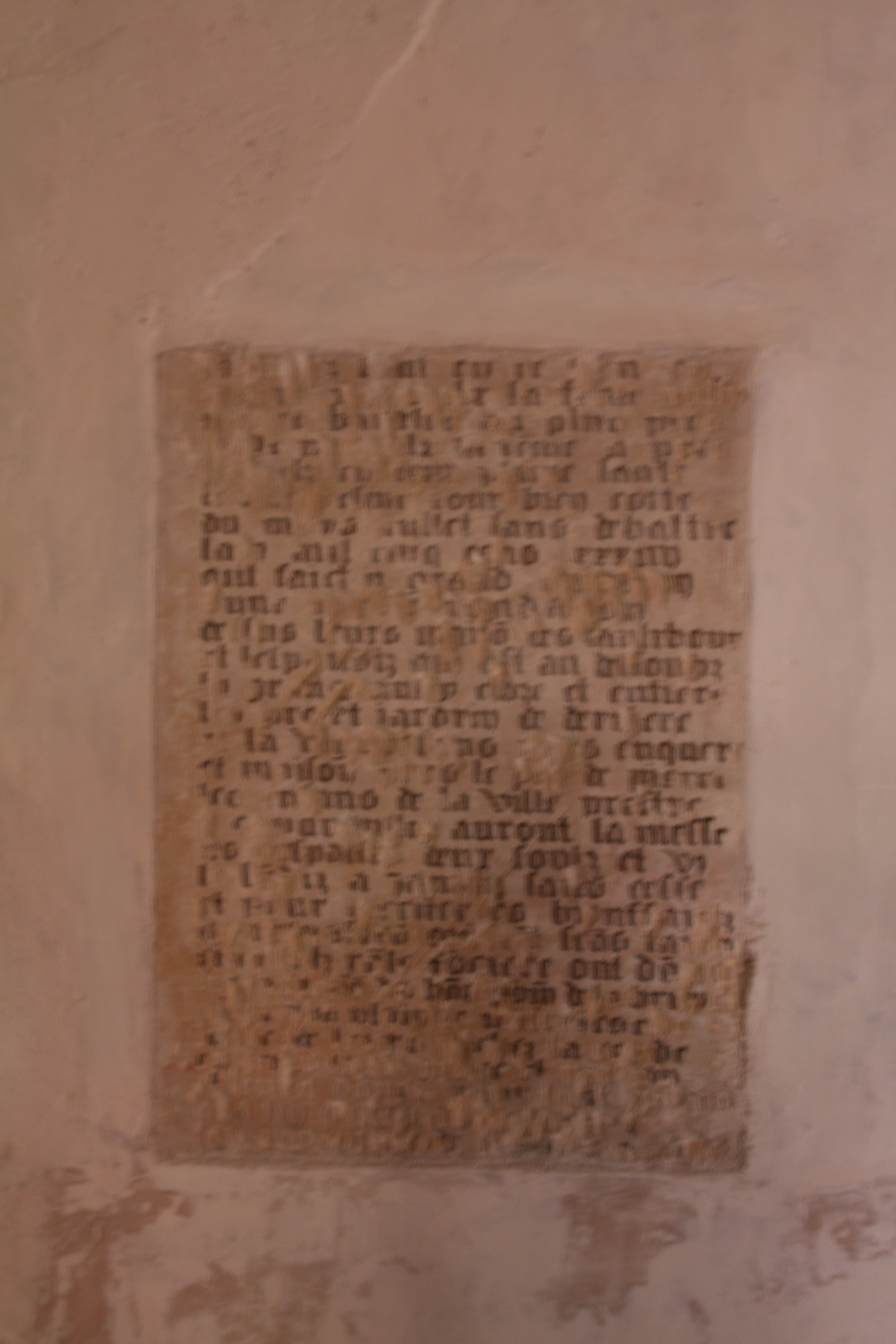
Funerary Slab

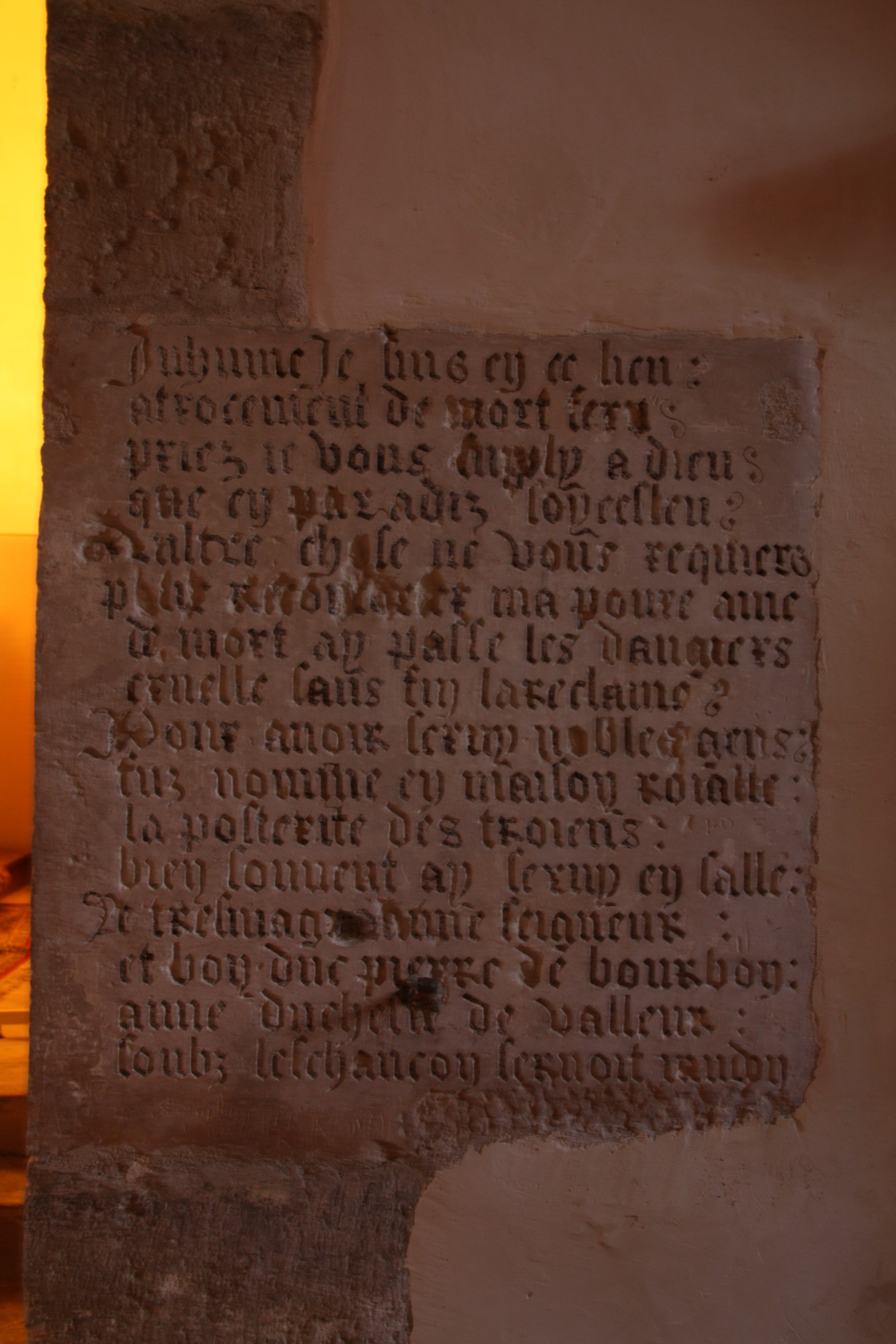
Funerary Slab

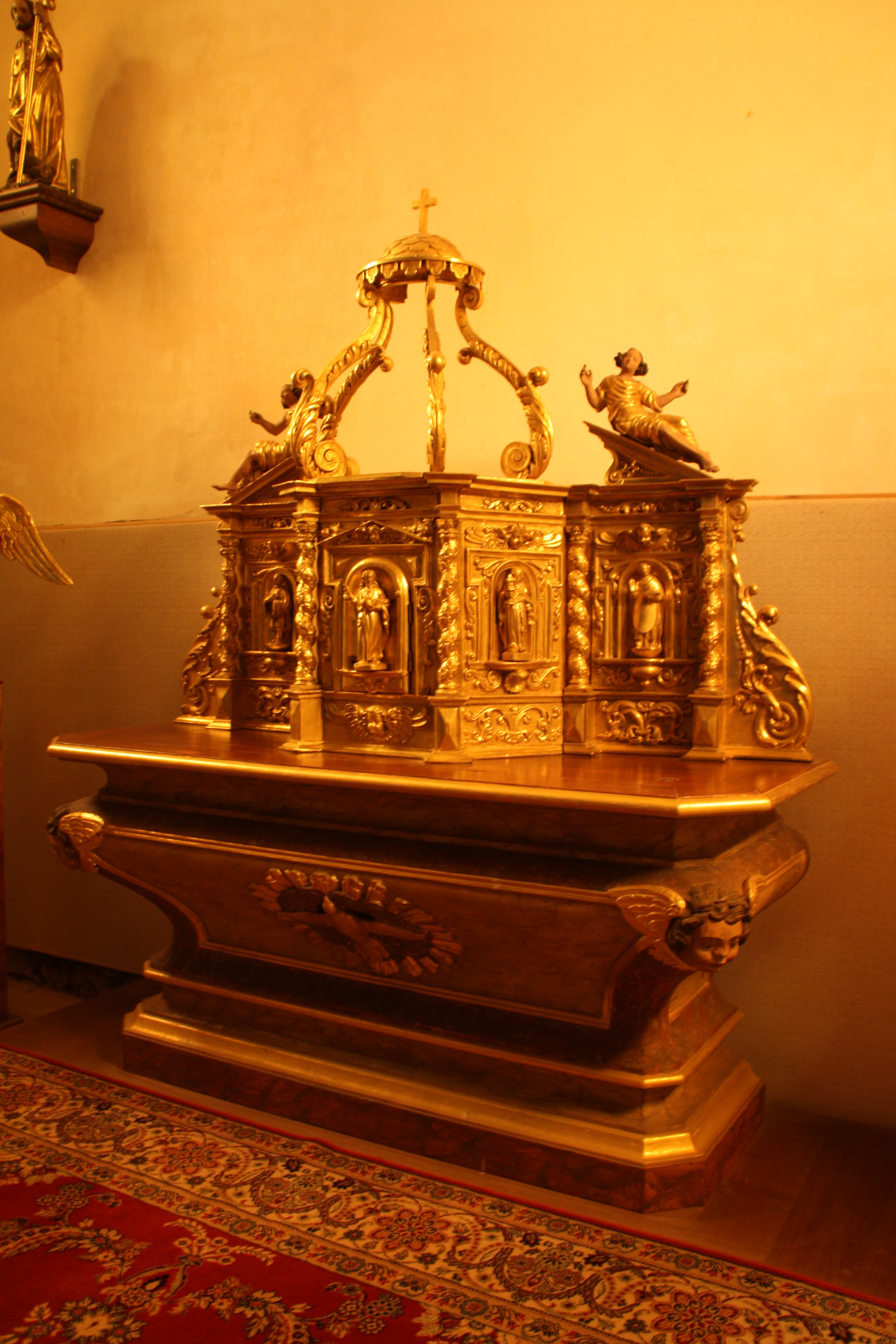
The Tabernacle

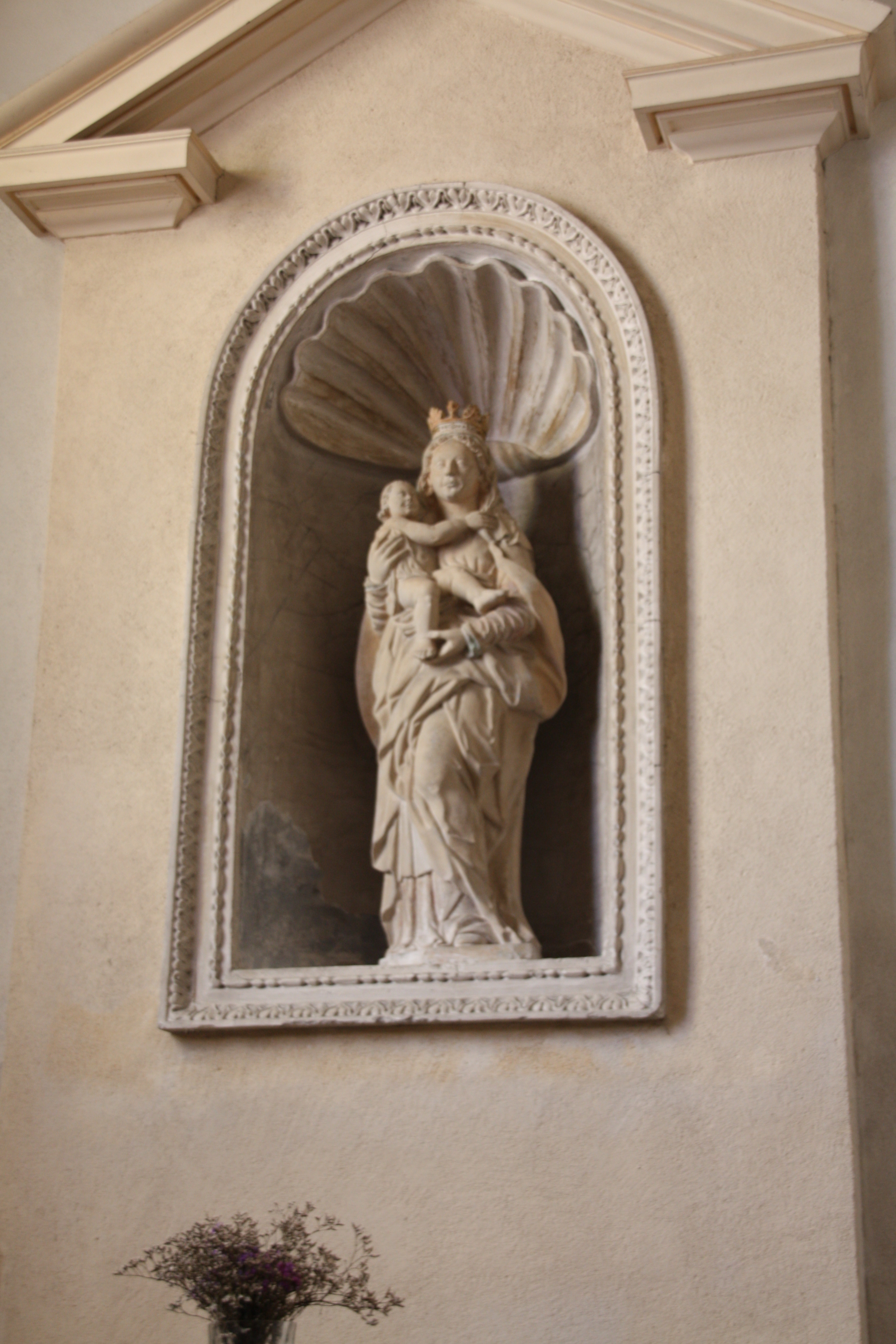
Virgin and child

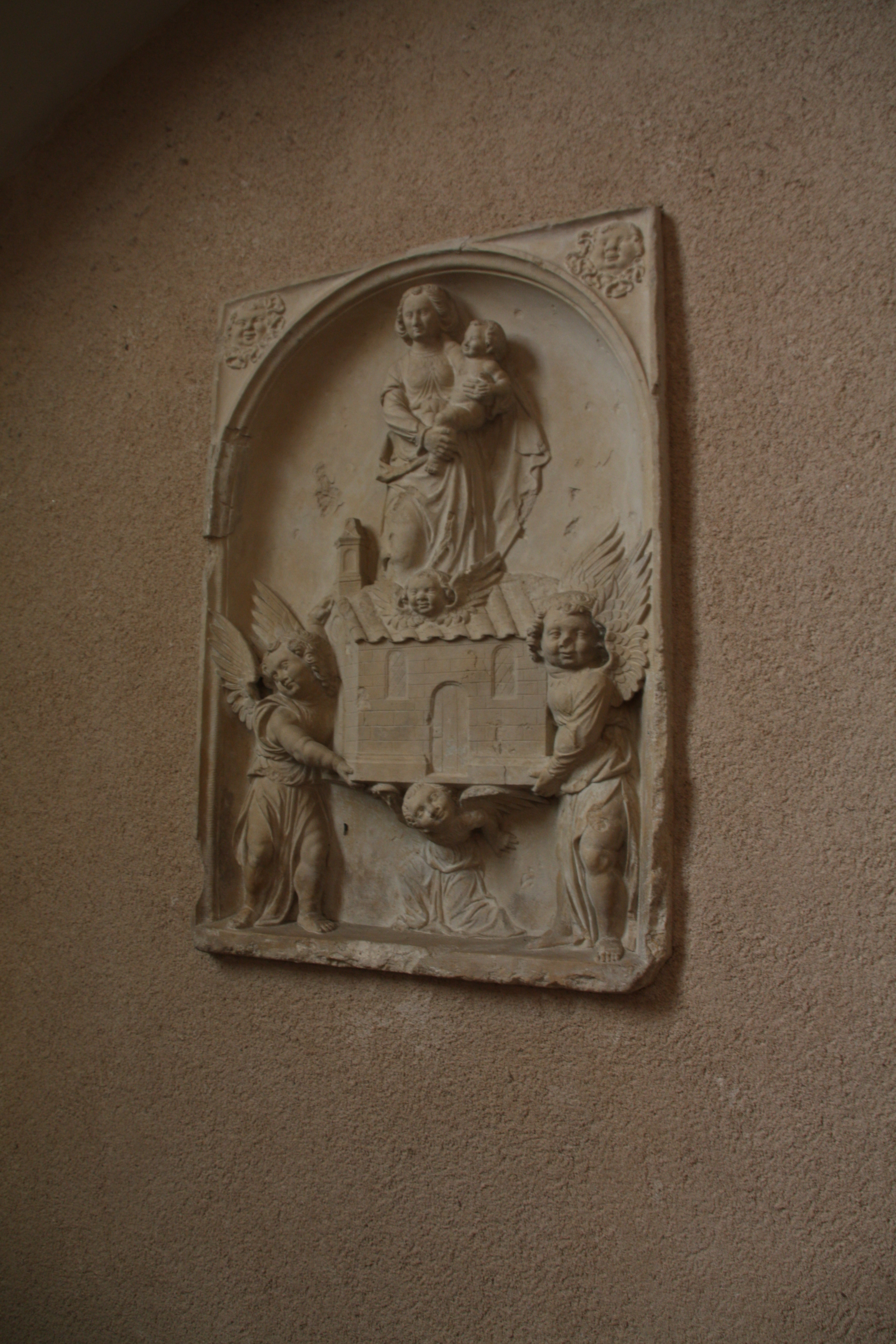
House of Lorette

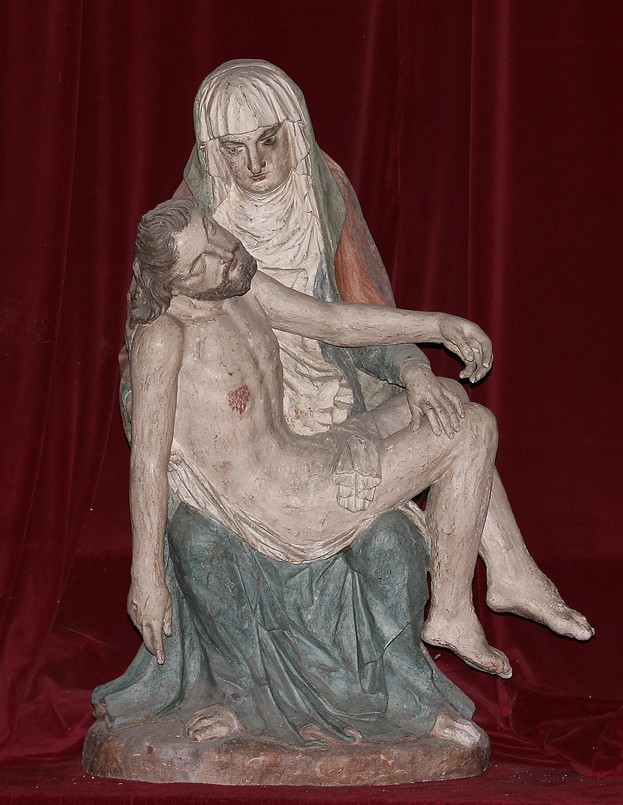
Pietà from the 16th century

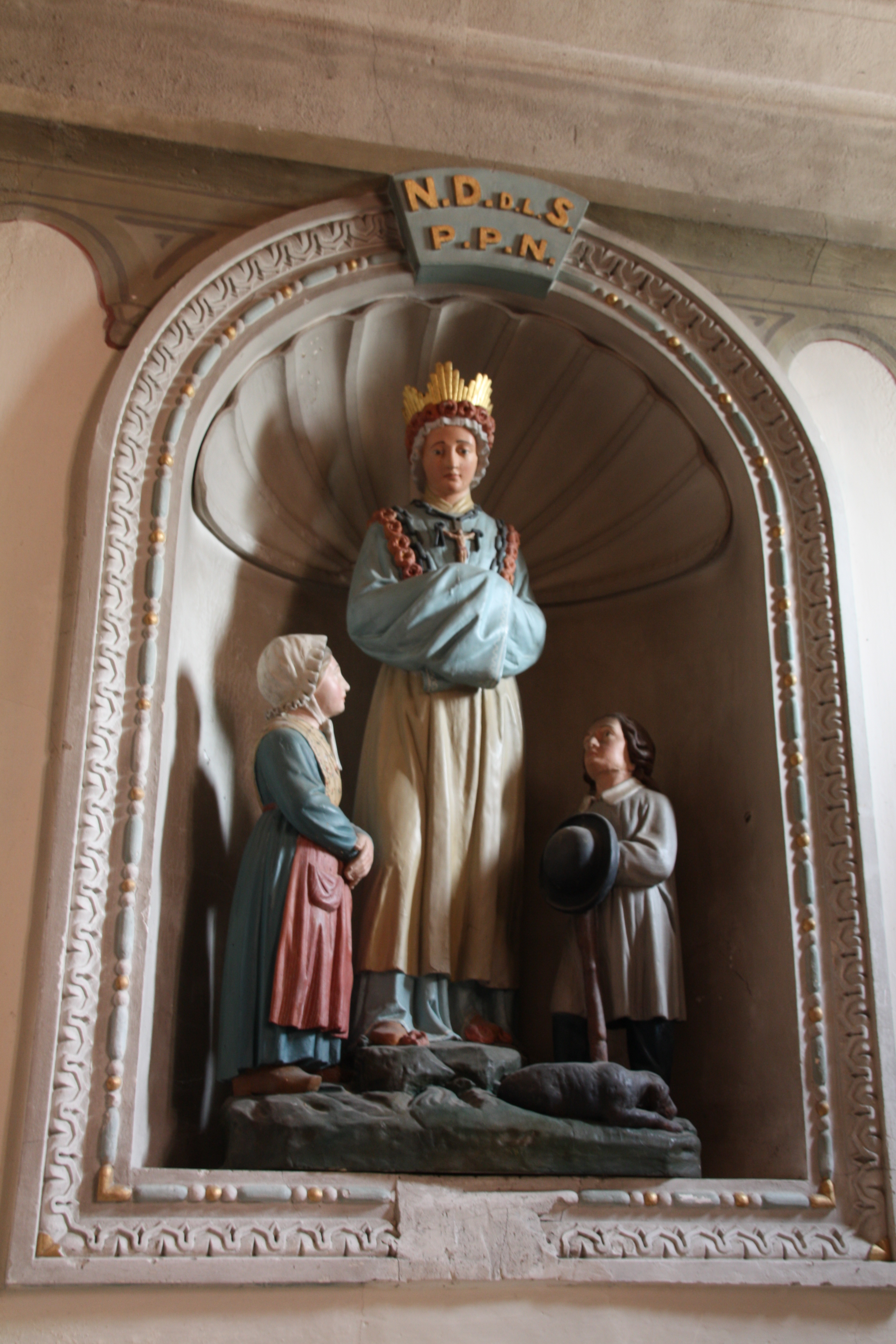
Notre Dame de la Salette
Church of Saint Roch

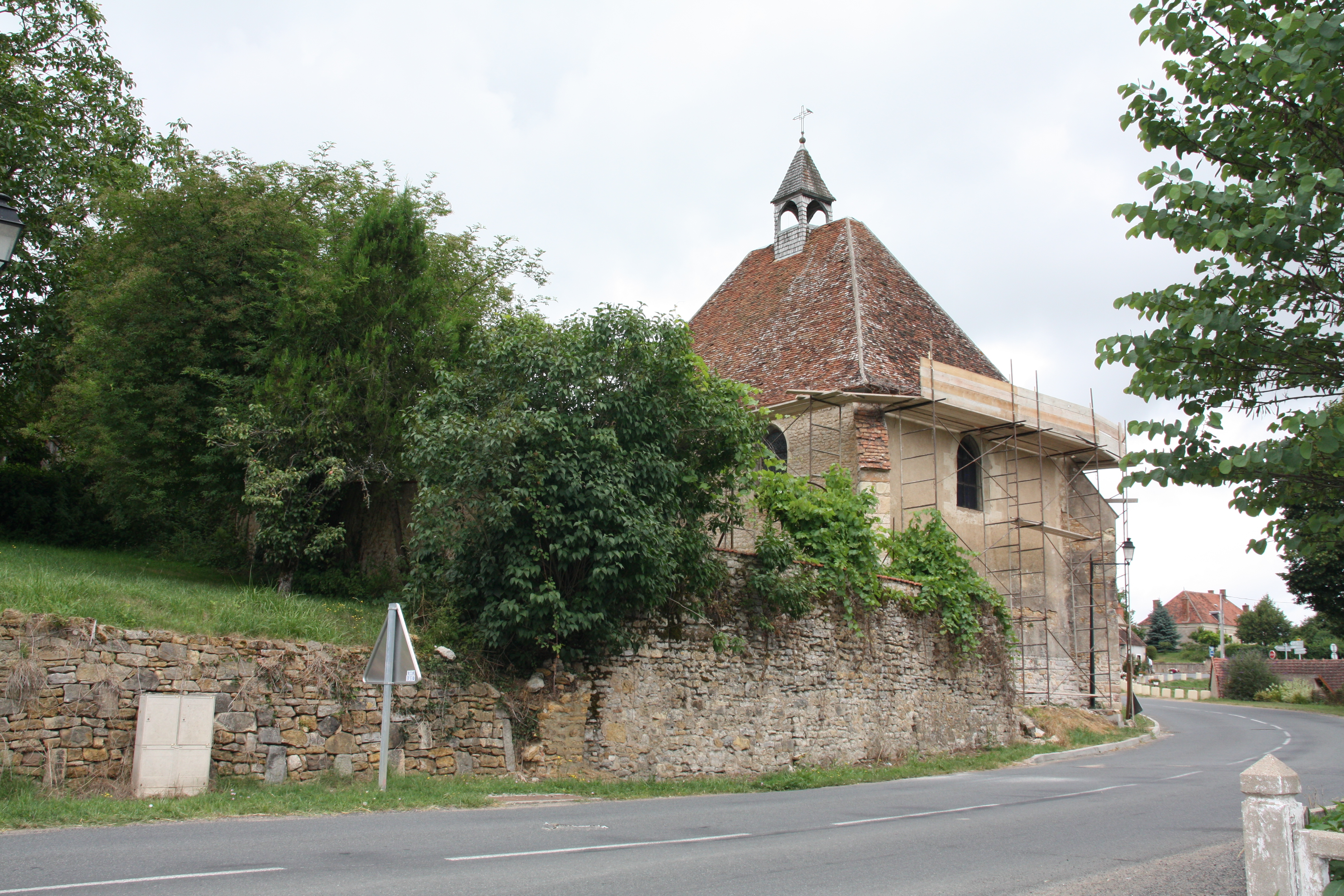

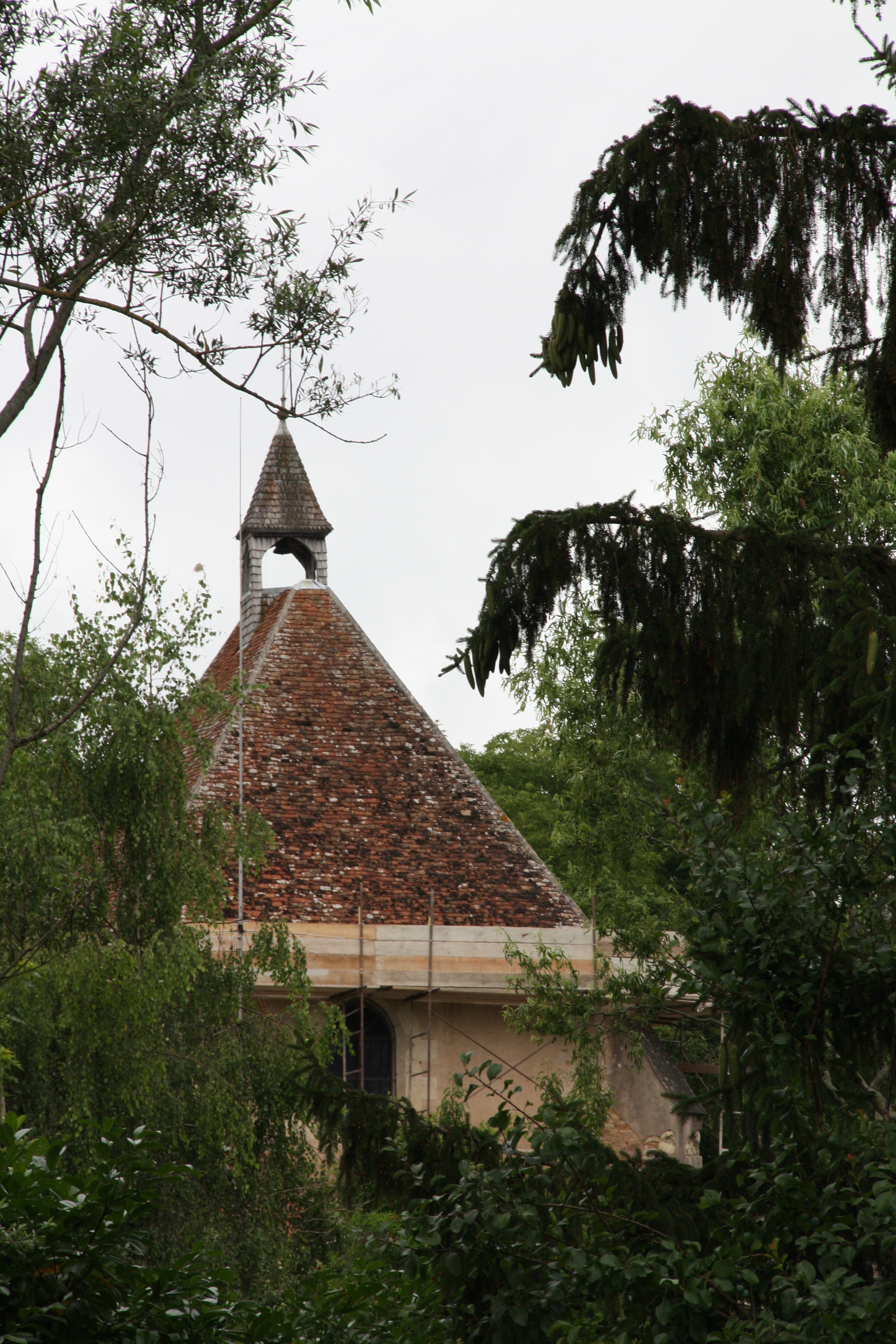

== Ainay-le-Château in culture ==
In autumn 2005 Ainay-le-Château was the location of many of the scenes in Michou d'Auber, a film by Thomas Gilou released in 2007, with Gérard Depardieu, Nathalie Baye, and Mathieu Amalric acting.

== Notable People linked to the commune ==
- Paul Guignard, racing cyclist, born on 10 May 1876 at Ainay-le-Château.
- André Lwoff, won the Nobel Prize in Medicine in 1965 together with Jacques Monod and François Jacob.

== See also ==
- Communes of the Allier department

=== Bibliography ===
- Henry Grozieux of Laguérenne, Ainay-le-Château in Bourbonnais, a history of the town and lordship from the beginning to the present day, Paris, H. Champion, 1912, 2 vols. in-8vo, fig., pl. and plans; repr. Yzeure, Imprimeries réunies, 1987, Vol. 1, 790 p.
- René Prophète, Ainay-le-Château - Visit to the church and the town, Les Imprimeries Réunies Réveret & Ardillon, Moulins, 1987.
