= Communauté de communes du Pays de Tronçais =

Pays de Tronçais
- Communauté de communes
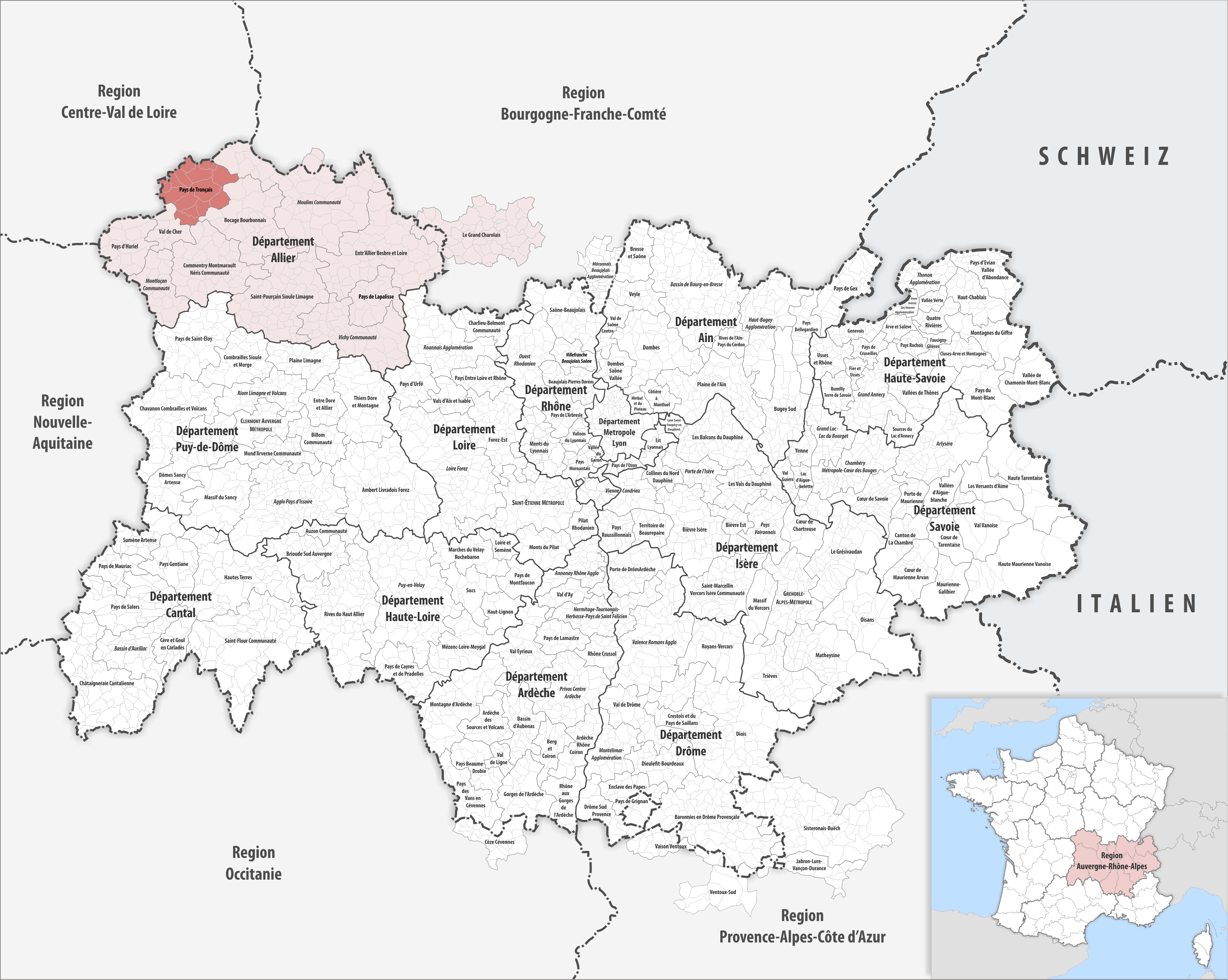
- Location in Auvergne-Rhône-Alpes
- Country: France
- Region: Auvergne-Rhône-Alpes
- Department: Allier
- No. of communes: {{{nbcomm}}}
- Established: 30 December 1999

Government
  - President (2020–2026): Daniel Rondet
- Area: 495.60 km^{2} (191.35 sq mi)
- Population (2023): 7,404
  - Density: 14.94/km^{2} (38.69/sq mi)
- Website: Official website

The communauté de communes du Pays de Tronçais is a communauté de communes, located in the Allier department of the Auvergne-Rhône-Alpes region of France. Created in 1999, its seat is in Cérilly. Its area is 495.6 km^{2}, and its population was 7,469 in 2020.

== Communal territory ==
=== Composition ===
The communauté de communes is composed of the 15 following communes:

List of communes of the communauté de communes du Pays de Tronçais
Commune	INSEE code	Demonym	Area (km^{2})	Population (2019)	Density (per km^{2})
Cérilly (seat)	03048	Cérillonnais	70.55	1,305	18
Ainay-le-Château	03003	Castelainaisiens	24.07	987	41
Braize	03037	Braizois	20.95	259	12
Le Brethon	03041	Brethonnois	44.61	319	7.2
Couleuvre	03087	Couleuvrois	53.83	597	11
Hérisson	03127	Hérissonnais	32.57	620	19
Isle-et-Bardais	03130	Islois	44.65	279	6.2
Lételon	03143		6.37	92	14
Meaulne-Vitray	03168		50.1	906	18
Saint-Bonnet-Tronçais	03221		27.98	730	26
Saint-Caprais	03222	Saint-Capraisiens	20.14	90	4.5
Theneuille	03282	Théneuillois	39.73	372	9.4
Urçay	03293	Urçayais	12.49	283	23
Valigny	03296	Valignois	21.18	276	18
Le Vilhain	03313		26.37	275	10

=== Demographics ===
Historical population
Year	Pop.	±% p.a.
1968	12,194	—
1975	11,053	−1.39%
1982	10,011	−1.40%
1990	9,238	−1.00%
1999	8,342	−1.13%
2007	7,888	−0.70%
2012	7,594	−0.76%
2017	7,452	−0.38%
2023	7,404	−0.11%
Source: INSEE

== Organization ==
=== List of presidents ===
List of successive presidents of the communauté de communes du Pays de Tronçais
In office		Name	Party	Capacity	Ref.
Includes some missing values.
	April 2015	Gérard Dériot	UMP	Mayor (1995-2001) then Deputy-mayor (2001-2015) of Cérilly Senator from Allier (1998-2020); General councilor from Cérilly (1985-2014); Departmental councilor from Bourbon-l'Archambault (2015–present); President of the General then Departmental Council of Allier (1992-1998, 2001–2008, and 2015-present)	
April 2015	July 2020	Corinne Trébosc-Coupas	DVD	Deputy-mayor of Ainay-le-Château Departmental councilor from Bourbon-l'Archambault (2015–present); Vice-president of the Departmental Council of Allier (2015–present)	
July 2020	Incumbent	Daniel Rondet		Mayor of Couleuvre (2008–present)	

== See also ==
- List of intercommunalities of the Allier department
