= List of intercommunalities of the Allier department =

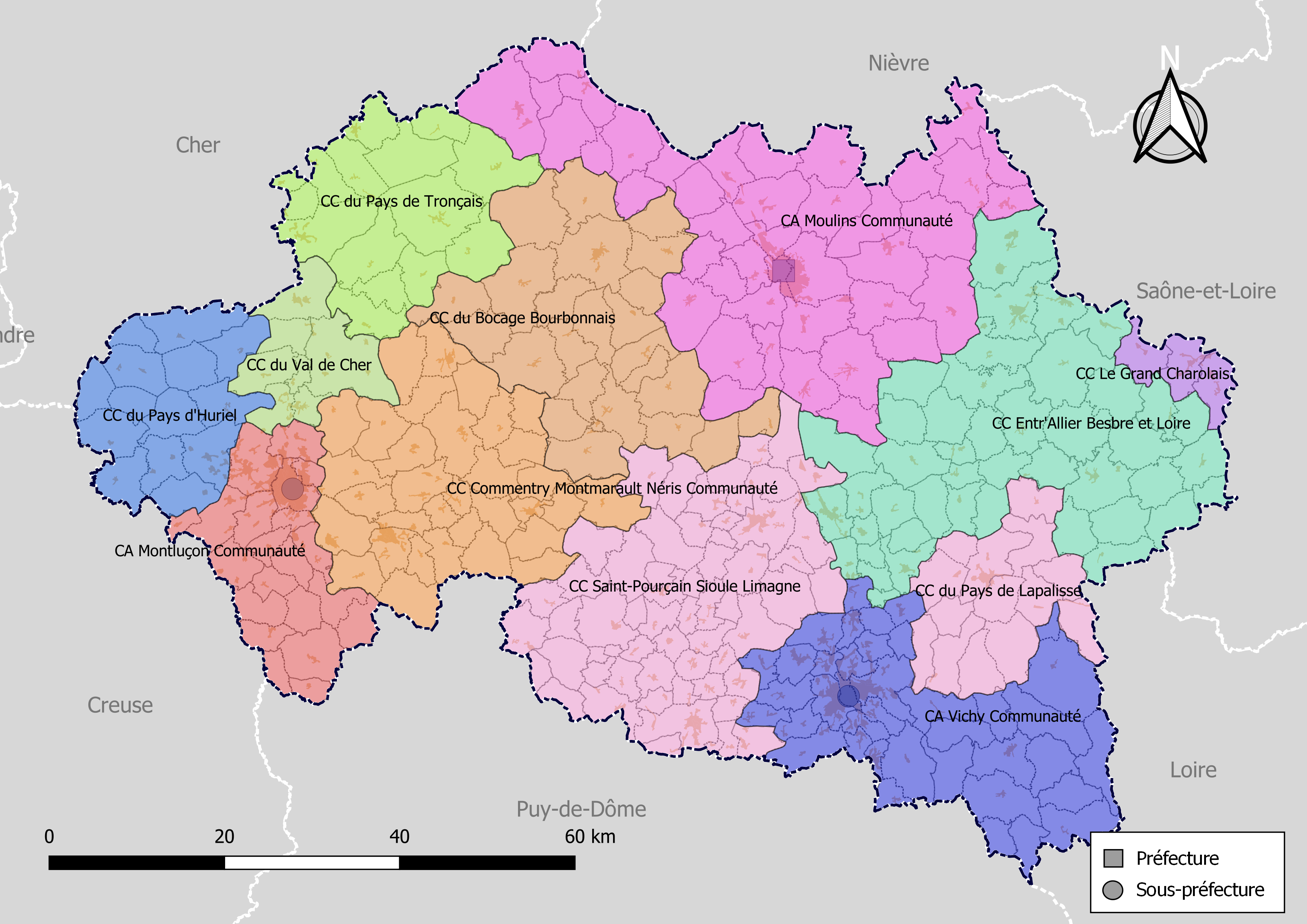
Map of Allier's intercommunal structures on 1 January 2019.

The department of Allier has, since 1 January 2017, had eleven public establishments for intercommunal cooperation (EPCI) with their own tax system: three communautés d'agglomération and eight communautés de communes.

Until 2016, the department had twenty-one intercommunal structures (three communautés d'agglomération and eighteen communautés de communes).

The 320 communes (318 in 2016 and 317 since 2017) of the department are part of a communautés d'agglomération/de communes of Allier or one of its neighbouring departments.

== List of intercommunalities in 2019 ==
Legal form	Name	SIREN number	Date of creation	Number of communes	Population (2018)	Area (km^{2})	Density (per km^{2})	Seat	President	Ref.
Agglomeration communities	CA Vichy Communauté	200071363	1 January 2017	39	82,759	741.30	112	Vichy	Frédéric Aguilera	
Agglomeration communities	CA Moulins Communauté	200071140	1 January 2017	44 (including 42 in Allier)	64,963	1,336.20	49	Moulins	Pierre-André Périssol	
Agglomeration communities	CA Montluçon Communauté	200071082	1 January 2017	21	61,151	377.80	162	Montluçon	Daniel Duglery	
Communauté de communes	CC Saint-Pourçain Sioule Limagne	200071512	1 January 2017	60	34,033	911.40	37	Saint-Pourçain-sur-Sioule	Véronique Pouzadoux	
Communauté de communes	CC Commentry Montmarault Néris Communauté	200071512	1 January 2017	33	25,858	728	36	Commentry	Bruno Rojouan	
Communauté de communes	CC Entr'Allier Besbre et Loire	200071470	1 January 2017	44	24,773	1,089.50	23	Varennes-sur-Allier	Roger Litaudon	
Communauté de communes	CC du Bocage Bourbonnais	200071496	1 January 2017	25	13,767	735.70	19	Bourbon-l'Archambault	Jean-Paul Dufregne	
Communauté de communes	CC du Pays de Lapalisse	240300491	20 December 1997	14	8,476	334	25	Lapalisse	Jacques De Chabannes	
Communauté de communes	CC du Pays d'Huriel	240300657	1 December 2001	14	7,487	378.50	20	Huriel	Michel Tabutin	
Communauté de communes	CC du Pays de Tronçais	240300558	30 December 1999	15	7,472	495.60	15	Cérilly	Denis Clerget	
Communauté de communes	CC du Val de Cher	240300566	3 February 2000	7	5,544	192.30	29	Audes	Gérard Ciofolo	
Intercommunalities whose seats are located outside of the department										
Communauté de communes	CC Le Grand Charolais	200071884	1 January 2017	44 (including 3 in Allier)	40,136	941.90	43	Paray-le-Monial (Saône-et-Loire)	Fabien Genet	

With the exception of the communauté de communes du Bocage Bourbonnais, subject to additional taxation, all of Allier's intercommunal governments apply a single professional tax.

By prefectural decree of 8 December 2017, the commune of Saint-Point was moved from the communauté de communes Saint-Pourçain Sioule Limagne to the agglomerated community of Vichy Communauté.
