= Saint-Léopardin-d'Augy =

- Commune
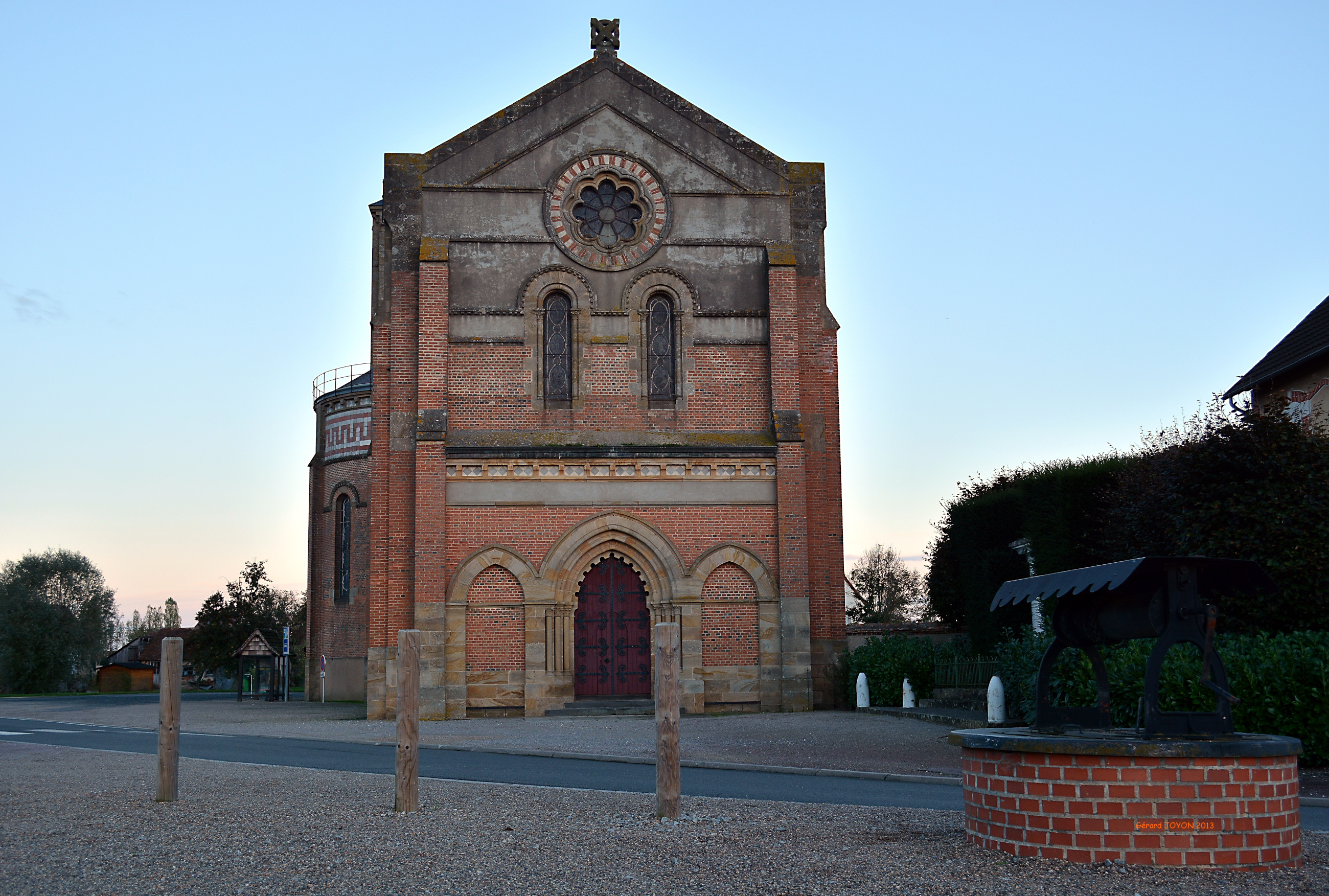
- The church in Saint-Léopardin d'Augy
- Location of Saint-Léopardin-d'Augy
- Location within France Location within Auvergne-Rhône-Alpes
- Coordinates: 46°41′02″N 3°06′17″E
- Country: France
- Region: Auvergne-Rhône-Alpes
- Department: Allier
- Arrondissement: Moulins
- Canton: Bourbon-l'Archambault
- Intercommunality: CA Moulins Communauté

Government
  - Mayor (2026–32): Patrick Clostre
- Area^{1}: 39.59 km^{2} (15.29 sq mi)
- Elevation: 237 m (778 ft)
- Highest elevation: 305 m (1,001 ft)
- Lowest elevation: 185 m (607 ft)
- Population (2023): 354
  - Density: 8.94/km^{2} (23.2/sq mi)
- Time zone: UTC+01:00 (CET)
  - Summer (DST): UTC+02:00 (CEST)
- INSEE/Postal code: 03241 /03160
- ^{1} French Land Register data, which excludes lakes, ponds, glaciers > 1 km^{2} (0.386 sq mi or 247 acres) and river estuaries.

Saint-Léopardin-d'Augy (French pronunciation: [sɛ̃ leɔpaʁdɛ̃ doʒi]) is a commune in the Allier department in Auvergne-Rhône-Alpes in central France.

== History ==
The commune is a result of the fusion of two previous towns (each from a parish of the Old Regime), St. Léopardin and Augy, by order of King Louis Philippe on 18 June 1843. During the French Revolution, the commune was called Vivier.

The name of St. Léopardin comes from that of a hermit, saint Léopardin, whose life seems just as legendary as that of St. Menoux. The priory of St. Léopardin is built where the hermit had lived.

== Geography ==
The town is bordered by two rivers: the Allier, in the northeast and north, which forms its boundary with Chantenay-Saint-Imbert and Livry, and Burge, in the east, tributary of the Allier, which forms most of its border with the town of Aubigny.

== Population ==
Historical population
Year	Pop.	±% p.a.
1968	590	—
1975	504	−2.23%
1982	436	−2.05%
1990	345	−2.88%
1999	328	−0.56%
2007	359	+1.14%
2012	347	−0.68%
2017	362	+0.85%
2023	354	−0.37%
Source: INSEE

== See also ==
- Communes of the Allier department
