= Château-sur-Allier =

- Commune
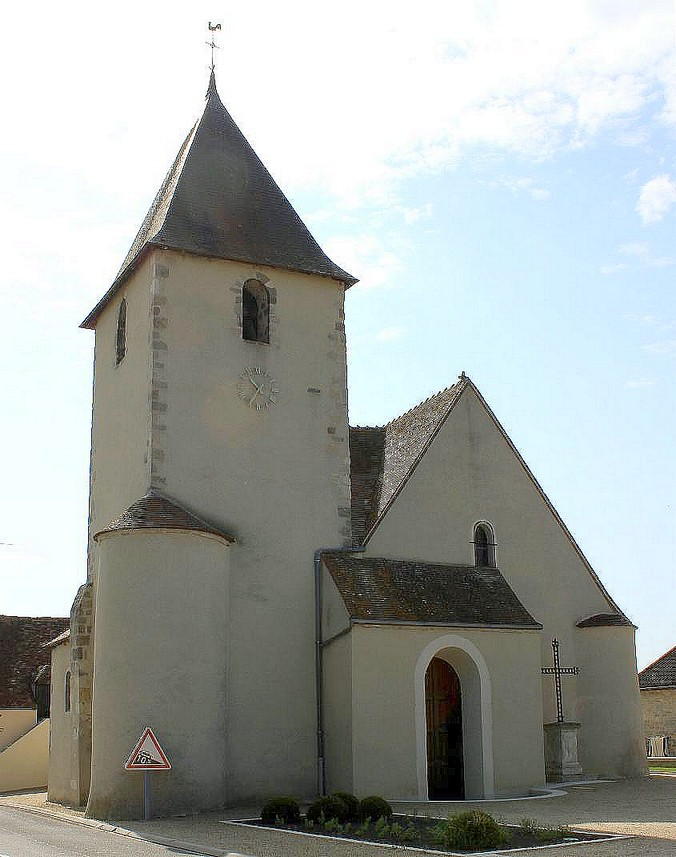
- The church in Château-sur-Allier

- Coat of arms
- Location of Château-sur-Allier
- Location within France Location within Auvergne-Rhône-Alpes
- Coordinates: 46°46′00″N 3°01′47″E
- Country: France
- Region: Auvergne-Rhône-Alpes
- Department: Allier
- Arrondissement: Moulins
- Canton: Bourbon-l'Archambault
- Intercommunality: CA Moulins Communauté

Government
  - Mayor (2026–32): Jérôme Bernadat
- Area^{1}: 27.75 km^{2} (10.71 sq mi)
- Elevation: 187 m (614 ft)
- Highest elevation: 233 m (764 ft)
- Lowest elevation: 180 m (590 ft)
- Population (2023): 160
  - Density: 5.8/km^{2} (15/sq mi)
- Time zone: UTC+01:00 (CET)
  - Summer (DST): UTC+02:00 (CEST)
- INSEE/Postal code: 03064 /03320
- ^{1} French Land Register data, which excludes lakes, ponds, glaciers > 1 km^{2} (0.386 sq mi or 247 acres) and river estuaries.

Château-sur-Allier (French pronunciation: [ʃɑto syʁ alje]) is a commune in the Allier department in central France.

== Population ==
Historical population
Year	Pop.	±% p.a.
1968	251	—
1975	212	−2.38%
1982	192	−1.41%
1990	208	+1.01%
1999	172	−2.09%
2007	169	−0.22%
2012	178	+1.04%
2017	179	+0.11%
2023	160	−1.85%
Source: INSEE

== See also ==
- Communes of the Allier department
