= Lételon =

- Commune
- Location of Lételon
- Location within France Location within Auvergne-Rhône-Alpes
- Coordinates: 46°39′24″N 2°35′10″E
- Country: France
- Region: Auvergne-Rhône-Alpes
- Department: Allier
- Arrondissement: Montluçon
- Canton: Bourbon-l'Archambault
- Intercommunality: CC du Pays de Tronçais

Government
  - Mayor (2026–32): Gwendoline Grondin
- Area^{1}: 6.37 km^{2} (2.46 sq mi)
- Elevation: 328 m (1,076 ft)
- Highest elevation: 237 m (778 ft)
- Lowest elevation: 158 m (518 ft)
- Population (2023): 93
  - Density: 15/km^{2} (38/sq mi)
- Time zone: UTC+01:00 (CET)
  - Summer (DST): UTC+02:00 (CEST)
- INSEE/Postal code: 03143 /03360
- ^{1} French Land Register data, which excludes lakes, ponds, glaciers > 1 km^{2} (0.386 sq mi or 247 acres) and river estuaries.

Lételon (French pronunciation: [letlɔ̃]) is a commune in the Allier department in central France.

== Population ==
Historical population
Year	Pop.	±% p.a.
1968	166	—
1975	165	−0.09%
1982	155	−0.89%
1990	143	−1.00%
1999	144	+0.08%
2007	133	−0.99%
2012	116	−2.70%
2017	106	−1.79%
2023	93	−2.16%
Source: INSEE

== See also ==
- Communes of the Allier department
