= Le Veurdre =

- Commune
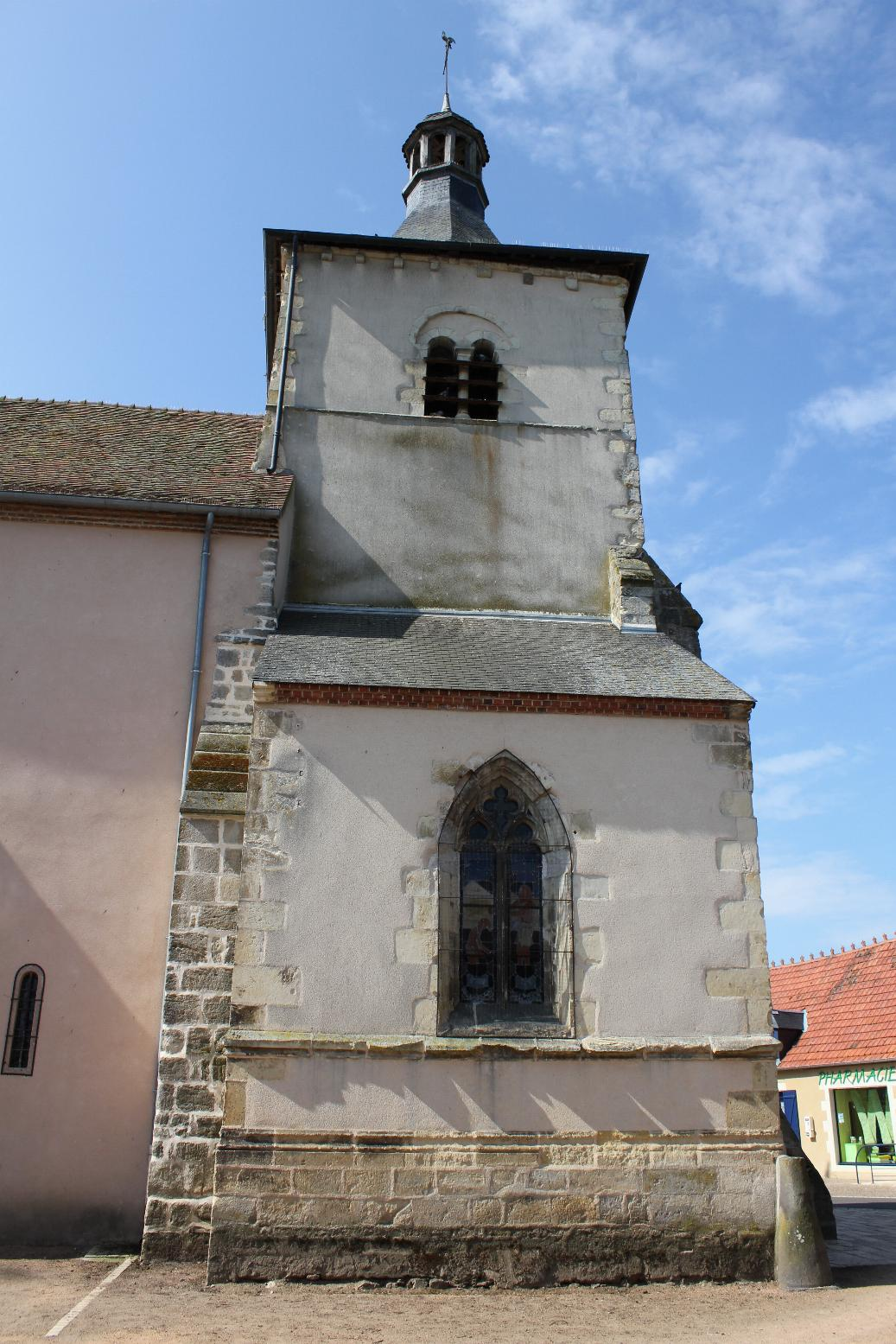
- The church in Le Veurdre
- Location of Le Veurdre
- Location within France Location within Auvergne-Rhône-Alpes
- Coordinates: 46°45′25″N 3°02′26″E
- Country: France
- Region: Auvergne-Rhône-Alpes
- Department: Allier
- Arrondissement: Moulins
- Canton: Bourbon-l'Archambault
- Intercommunality: CA Moulins Communauté

Government
  - Mayor (2026–32): Ghislain Collas de Chatelperron
- Area^{1}: 21.16 km^{2} (8.17 sq mi)
- Elevation: 190 m (620 ft)
- Highest elevation: 241 m (791 ft)
- Lowest elevation: 182 m (597 ft)
- Population (2023): 475
  - Density: 22.4/km^{2} (58.1/sq mi)
- Time zone: UTC+01:00 (CET)
  - Summer (DST): UTC+02:00 (CEST)
- INSEE/Postal code: 03309 /03320
- ^{1} French Land Register data, which excludes lakes, ponds, glaciers > 1 km^{2} (0.386 sq mi or 247 acres) and river estuaries.

Le Veurdre (French pronunciation: [lə vœʁdʁ]) is a commune in the Allier department in Auvergne-Rhône-Alpes in central France.

== Population ==
Historical population
Year	Pop.	±% p.a.
1968	717	—
1975	699	−0.36%
1982	604	−2.07%
1990	595	−0.19%
1999	578	−0.32%
2007	541	−0.82%
2012	484	−2.20%
2017	455	−1.23%
2023	475	+0.72%
Source: INSEE

== See also ==
- Communes of the Allier department
