= Isle-et-Bardais =

- Commune
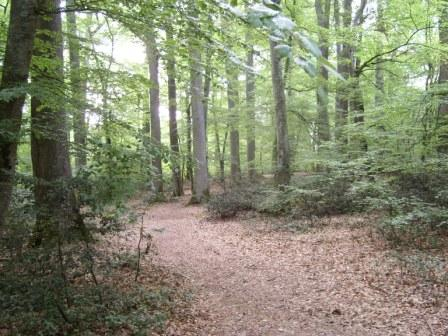
- The forest of Tronçais
- Location of Isle-et-Bardais
- Location within France Location within Auvergne-Rhône-Alpes
- Coordinates: 46°41′21″N 2°47′40″E
- Country: France
- Region: Auvergne-Rhône-Alpes
- Department: Allier
- Arrondissement: Montluçon
- Canton: Bourbon-l'Archambault
- Intercommunality: CC du Pays de Tronçais

Government
  - Mayor (2026–32): Daniel Artigaud
- Area^{1}: 44.65 km^{2} (17.24 sq mi)
- Elevation: 222 m (728 ft)
- Highest elevation: 308 m (1,010 ft)
- Lowest elevation: 201 m (659 ft)
- Population (2023): 273
  - Density: 6.11/km^{2} (15.8/sq mi)
- Time zone: UTC+01:00 (CET)
  - Summer (DST): UTC+02:00 (CEST)
- INSEE/Postal code: 03130 /03360
- ^{1} French Land Register data, which excludes lakes, ponds, glaciers > 1 km^{2} (0.386 sq mi or 247 acres) and river estuaries.

Isle-et-Bardais (French pronunciation: [il e baʁdɛ]) is a commune in the Allier department in central France.

== Population ==
Historical population
Year	Pop.	±% p.a.
1968	538	—
1975	476	−1.73%
1982	381	−3.13%
1990	355	−0.88%
1999	321	−1.11%
2007	284	−1.52%
2012	270	−1.01%
2017	272	+0.15%
2023	273	+0.06%
Source: INSEE

== See also ==
- Communes of the Allier department
