= Couleuvre =

Commune in Auvergne-Rhône-Alpes, France

- Commune
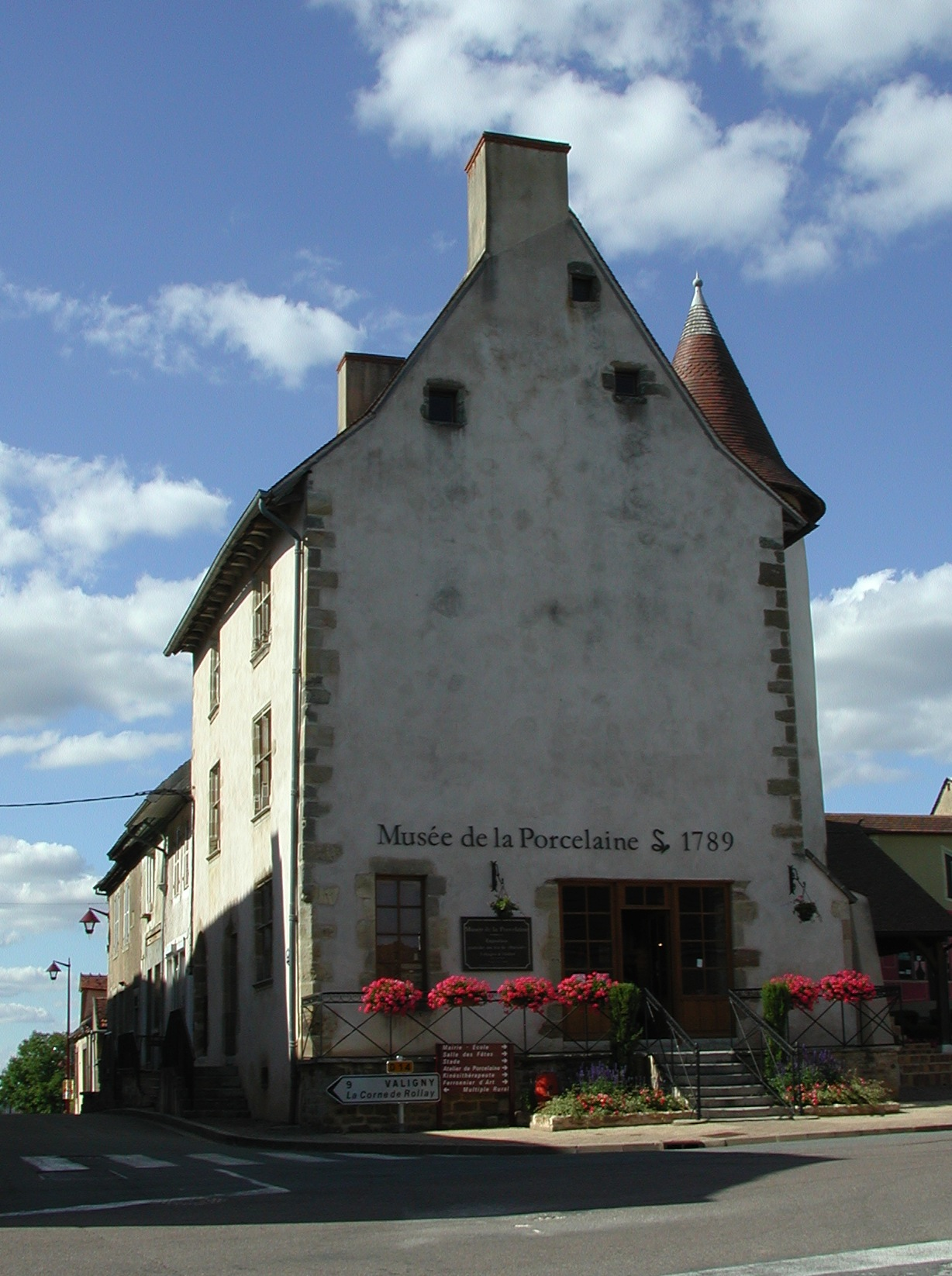
- The museum in Couleuvre
- Location of Couleuvre
- Location within France Location within Auvergne-Rhône-Alpes
- Coordinates: 46°40′22″N 2°54′30″E
- Country: France
- Region: Auvergne-Rhône-Alpes
- Department: Allier
- Arrondissement: Montluçon
- Canton: Bourbon-l'Archambault
- Intercommunality: CC du Pays de Tronçais

Government
  - Mayor (2026–32): Michel Galopier
- Area^{1}: 53.83 km^{2} (20.78 sq mi)
- Elevation: 236 m (774 ft)
- Highest elevation: 317 m (1,040 ft)
- Lowest elevation: 207 m (679 ft)
- Population (2023): 580
  - Density: 11/km^{2} (28/sq mi)
- Time zone: UTC+01:00 (CET)
  - Summer (DST): UTC+02:00 (CEST)
- INSEE/Postal code: 03087 /03320
- ^{1} French Land Register data, which excludes lakes, ponds, glaciers > 1 km^{2} (0.386 sq mi or 247 acres) and river estuaries.

Couleuvre (French pronunciation: [kulœvʁ]) is a commune in the department of Allier in Auvergne in central France.

== Population ==
Historical population
Year	Pop.	±% p.a.
1968	1,126	—
1975	900	−3.15%
1982	796	−1.74%
1990	716	−1.32%
1999	645	−1.15%
2007	580	−1.32%
2012	578	−0.07%
2017	581	+0.10%
2023	580	−0.03%
Source: INSEE

== See also ==
- Communes of the Allier department
