= Pouzy-Mésangy =

- Commune
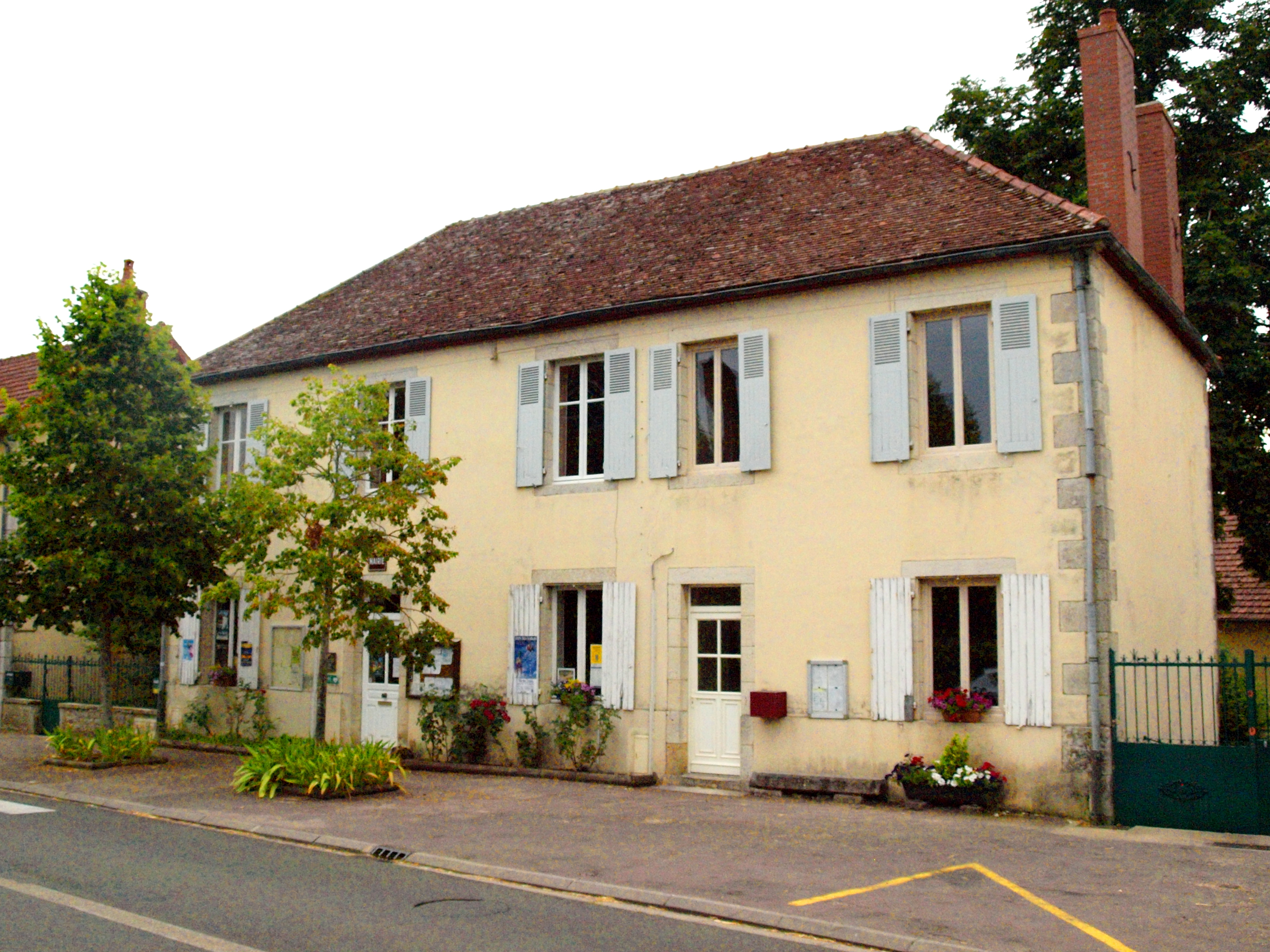
- Town hall

- Coat of arms
- Location of Pouzy-Mésangy
- Location within France Location within Auvergne-Rhône-Alpes
- Coordinates: 46°42′34″N 3°00′17″E
- Country: France
- Region: Auvergne-Rhône-Alpes
- Department: Allier
- Arrondissement: Moulins
- Canton: Bourbon-l'Archambault
- Intercommunality: CA Moulins Communauté

Government
  - Mayor (2026–32): Alain Virlogeux
- Area^{1}: 35.04 km^{2} (13.53 sq mi)
- Elevation: 260 m (850 ft)
- Highest elevation: 255 m (837 ft)
- Lowest elevation: 187 m (614 ft)
- Population (2023): 378
  - Density: 10.8/km^{2} (27.9/sq mi)
- Time zone: UTC+01:00 (CET)
  - Summer (DST): UTC+02:00 (CEST)
- INSEE/Postal code: 03210 /03320
- ^{1} French Land Register data, which excludes lakes, ponds, glaciers > 1 km^{2} (0.386 sq mi or 247 acres) and river estuaries.

Pouzy-Mésangy (French pronunciation: [puzi mezɑ̃ʒi]) is a commune in the Allier department in Auvergne in central France.

== Population ==
Historical population
Year	Pop.	±% p.a.
1968	644	—
1975	541	−2.46%
1982	488	−1.46%
1990	429	−1.60%
1999	411	−0.48%
2007	420	+0.27%
2012	403	−0.82%
2017	402	−0.05%
2023	378	−1.02%
Source: INSEE

== See also ==
- Communes of the Allier department
