= Couzon =

- Commune
- Location of Couzon
- Location within France Location within Auvergne-Rhône-Alpes
- Coordinates: 46°39′32″N 3°07′18″E
- Country: France
- Region: Auvergne-Rhône-Alpes
- Department: Allier
- Arrondissement: Moulins
- Canton: Bourbon-l'Archambault
- Intercommunality: CA Moulins Communauté

Government
  - Mayor (2026–32): Sandra Beaudequin
- Area^{1}: 19.85 km^{2} (7.66 sq mi)
- Elevation: 224 m (735 ft)
- Highest elevation: 274 m (899 ft)
- Lowest elevation: 197 m (646 ft)
- Population (2023): 328
  - Density: 16.5/km^{2} (42.8/sq mi)
- Time zone: UTC+01:00 (CET)
  - Summer (DST): UTC+02:00 (CEST)
- INSEE/Postal code: 03090 /03160
- ^{1} French Land Register data, which excludes lakes, ponds, glaciers > 1 km^{2} (0.386 sq mi or 247 acres) and river estuaries.

Couzon (French pronunciation: [kuzɔ̃]) is a commune in the Allier department in central France.

== Population ==
Historical population
Year	Pop.	±% p.a.
1968	355	—
1975	291	−2.80%
1982	301	+0.48%
1990	290	−0.46%
1999	294	+0.15%
2007	295	+0.04%
2012	282	−0.90%
2017	299	+1.18%
2023	328	+1.55%
Source: INSEE

== Economy ==
The economy is based around forestry, agriculture and most people have small holdings. This region was prized for its clay and there are many old 'Tuileries' which were the old tile-making sites. The weather used to be very hot in the summer with snow in the winter as it is quite high up, but the last couple of years have seen an increase in rain (to the point of damaging crops), and milder summers.

== Facilities ==
The nearest small town and supermarket is ten minutes away at Bourbon L'Archambault, which was the original seat of the Dukes of Bourbon in medieval times and has the remains of a superb castle, it was also a Roman bath town. The nearest large town is Moulins, Allier.

There is also a house that Joan of Arc is said to have stayed in.

== Sport ==
There is an excellent sports complex and it is possible to go kayaking and canoeing on the river. There are also a variety of sports clubs including motocross, archery, scuba diving, martial arts and rifle shooting.

== See also ==
- Communes of the Allier department
