= Limoise =

- Commune
- Coat of arms
- Location of Limoise
- Location within France Location within Auvergne-Rhône-Alpes
- Coordinates: 46°40′37″N 3°03′09″E
- Country: France
- Region: Auvergne-Rhône-Alpes
- Department: Allier
- Arrondissement: Moulins
- Canton: Bourbon-l'Archambault
- Intercommunality: CA Moulins Communauté

Government
  - Mayor (2026–32): Danièle Thiériot
- Area^{1}: 12.56 km^{2} (4.85 sq mi)
- Elevation: 280 m (920 ft)
- Highest elevation: 318 m (1,043 ft)
- Lowest elevation: 222 m (728 ft)
- Population (2023): 175
  - Density: 13.9/km^{2} (36.1/sq mi)
- Time zone: UTC+01:00 (CET)
  - Summer (DST): UTC+02:00 (CEST)
- INSEE/Postal code: 03146 /03320
- ^{1} French Land Register data, which excludes lakes, ponds, glaciers > 1 km^{2} (0.386 sq mi or 247 acres) and river estuaries.

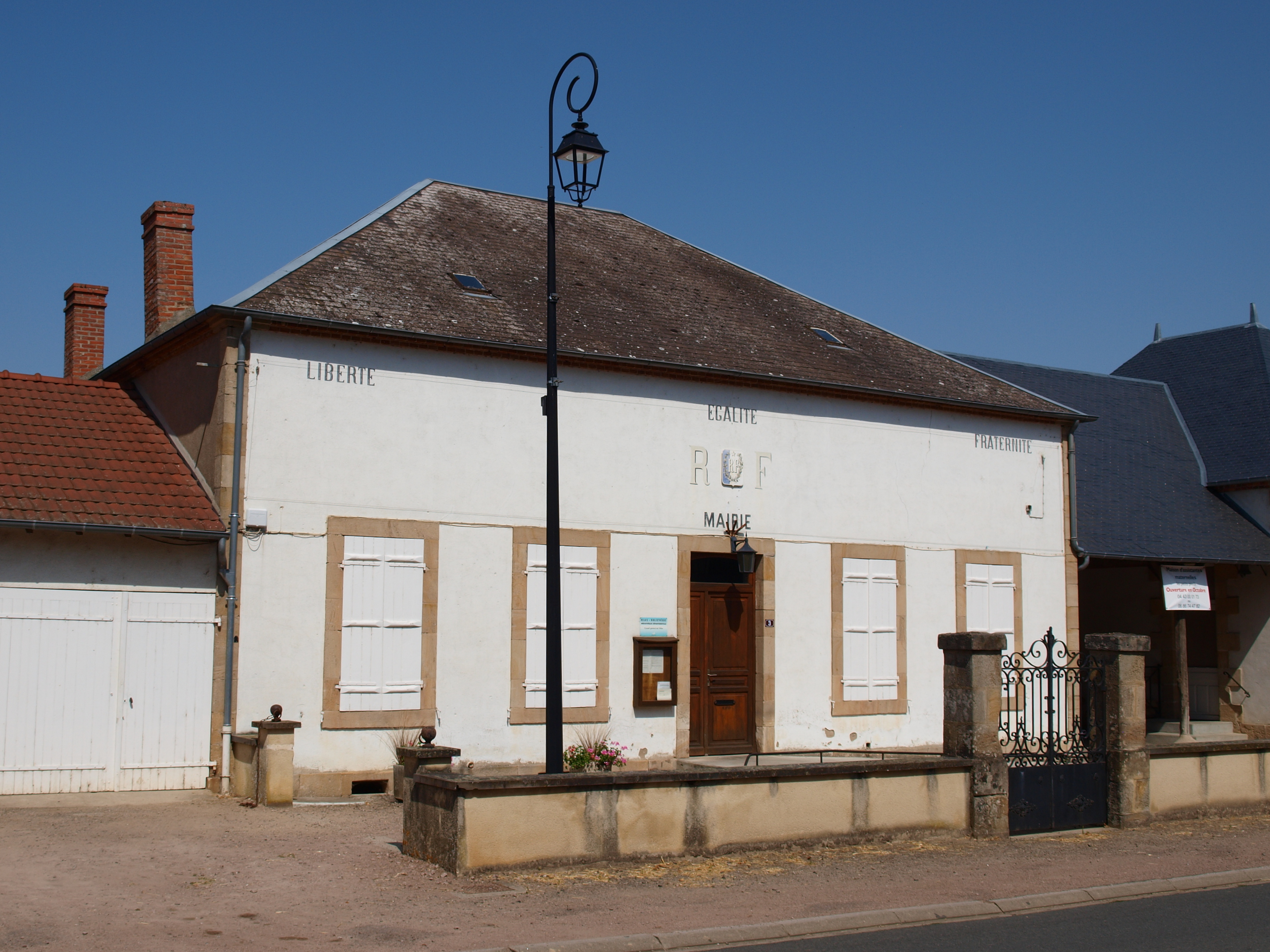
Street view of the Limoise commune

Limoise (French pronunciation: [limwaz]) is a commune in the Allier department in central France.

== Population ==
Historical population
Year	Pop.	±% p.a.
1968	196	—
1975	180	−1.21%
1982	180	+0.00%
1990	156	−1.77%
1999	157	+0.07%
2007	170	+1.00%
2012	178	+0.92%
2017	156	−2.60%
2023	175	+1.93%
Source: INSEE

== See also ==
- Communes of the Allier department
