= Le Vilhain =

- Commune
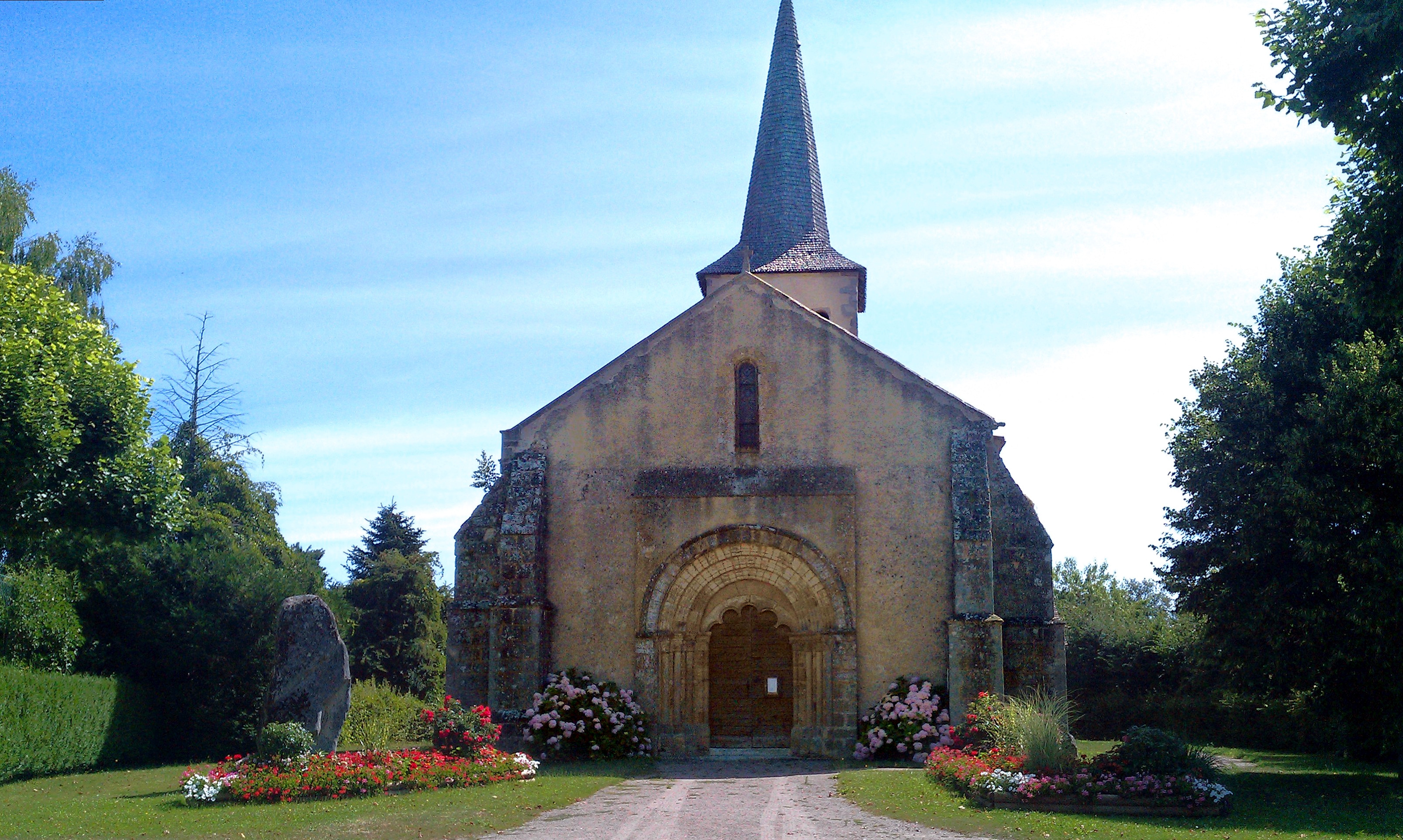
- The church in Le Vilhain
- Location of Le Vilhain
- Location within France Location within Auvergne-Rhône-Alpes
- Coordinates: 46°33′44″N 2°47′53″E
- Country: France
- Region: Auvergne-Rhône-Alpes
- Department: Allier
- Arrondissement: Montluçon
- Canton: Bourbon-l'Archambault
- Intercommunality: CC du Pays de Tronçais

Government
  - Mayor (2026–32): Amandine Coffin
- Area^{1}: 26.37 km^{2} (10.18 sq mi)
- Elevation: 360 m (1,180 ft)
- Highest elevation: 412 m (1,352 ft)
- Lowest elevation: 266 m (873 ft)
- Population (2023): 266
  - Density: 10.1/km^{2} (26.1/sq mi)
- Time zone: UTC+01:00 (CET)
  - Summer (DST): UTC+02:00 (CEST)
- INSEE/Postal code: 03313 /03350
- ^{1} French Land Register data, which excludes lakes, ponds, glaciers > 1 km^{2} (0.386 sq mi or 247 acres) and river estuaries.

Le Vilhain is a commune in the Allier department in Auvergne-Rhône-Alpes in central France.

== Population ==
Historical population
Year	Pop.	±% p.a.
1968	501	—
1975	361	−4.57%
1982	321	−1.66%
1990	289	−1.30%
1999	267	−0.88%
2007	267	+0.00%
2012	258	−0.68%
2017	275	+1.28%
2023	266	−0.55%
Source: INSEE

== See also ==
- Communes of the Allier department
