= Saint-Bonnet-Tronçais =

- Commune
- Coat of arms
- Location of Saint-Bonnet-Tronçais
- Location within France Location within Auvergne-Rhône-Alpes
- Coordinates: 46°39′39″N 2°41′38″E
- Country: France
- Region: Auvergne-Rhône-Alpes
- Department: Allier
- Arrondissement: Montluçon
- Canton: Bourbon-l'Archambault
- Intercommunality: CC du Pays de Tronçais

Government
  - Mayor (2026–32): Didier Regrain
- Area^{1}: 27.98 km^{2} (10.80 sq mi)
- Elevation: 230 m (750 ft)
- Highest elevation: 271 m (889 ft)
- Lowest elevation: 198 m (650 ft)
- Population (2023): 726
  - Density: 25.9/km^{2} (67.2/sq mi)
- Time zone: UTC+01:00 (CET)
  - Summer (DST): UTC+02:00 (CEST)
- INSEE/Postal code: 03221 /03360
- ^{1} French Land Register data, which excludes lakes, ponds, glaciers > 1 km^{2} (0.386 sq mi or 247 acres) and river estuaries.

Saint-Bonnet-Tronçais (French pronunciation: [sɛ̃ bɔnɛ tʁɔ̃sɛ]) is a commune in the Allier department in Auvergne-Rhône-Alpes in central France, within the borders of the national Forest of Tronçais.

== Population ==
Historical population
Year	Pop.	±% p.a.
1968	1,105	—
1975	1,003	−1.37%
1982	853	−2.29%
1990	913	+0.85%
1999	783	−1.69%
2007	760	−0.37%
2012	730	−0.80%
2017	725	−0.14%
2023	726	+0.02%
Source: INSEE

== See also ==
- Communes of the Allier department
