= Urçay =

- Commune
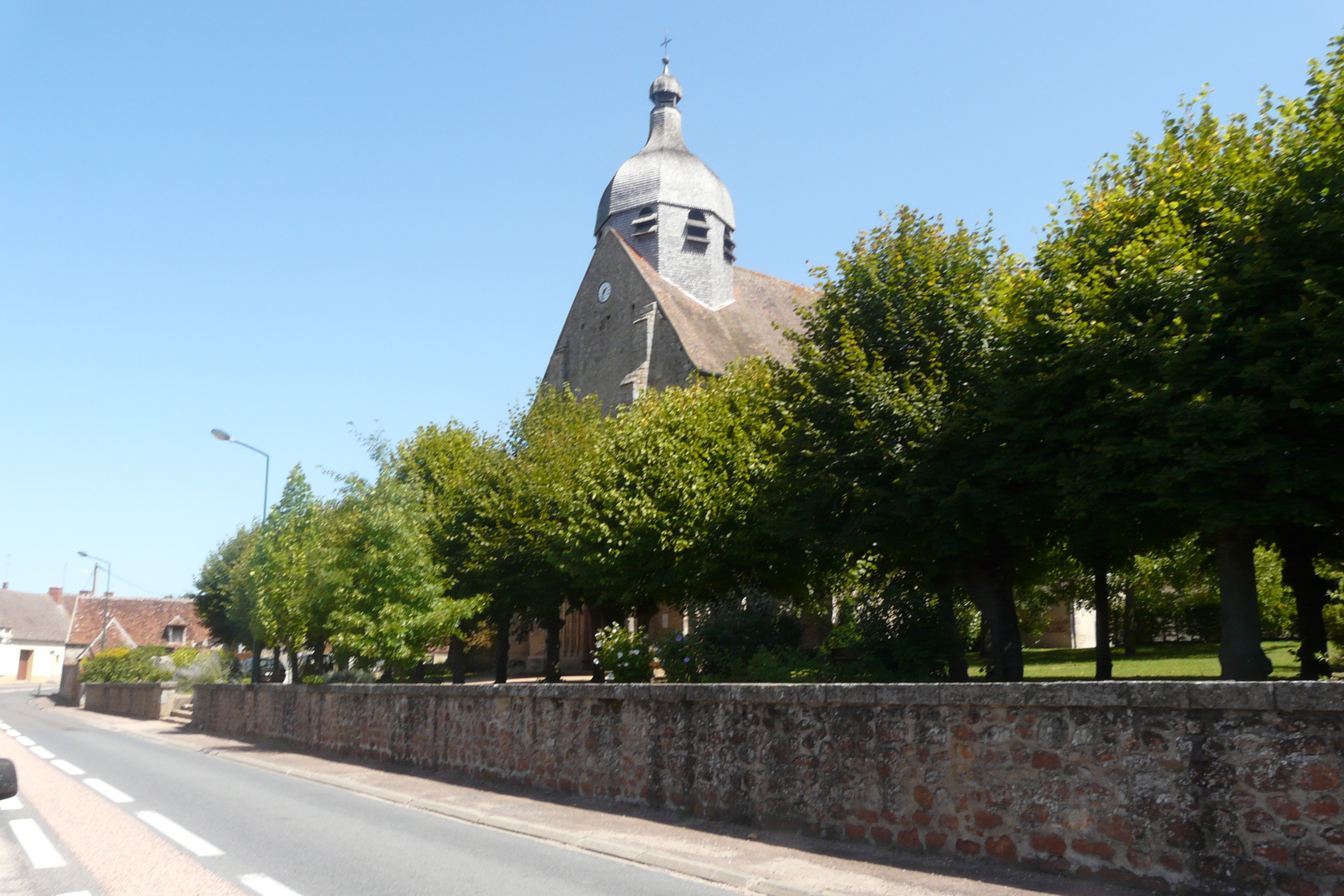
- The church in Urçay

- Coat of arms
- Location of Urçay
- Location within France Location within Auvergne-Rhône-Alpes
- Coordinates: 46°37′30″N 2°35′20″E
- Country: France
- Region: Auvergne-Rhône-Alpes
- Department: Allier
- Arrondissement: Montluçon
- Canton: Bourbon-l'Archambault
- Intercommunality: CC du Pays de Tronçais

Government
  - Mayor (2026–32): Christophe Bajard
- Area^{1}: 12.49 km^{2} (4.82 sq mi)
- Elevation: 169 m (554 ft)
- Highest elevation: 278 m (912 ft)
- Lowest elevation: 158 m (518 ft)
- Population (2023): 296
  - Density: 23.7/km^{2} (61.4/sq mi)
- Time zone: UTC+01:00 (CET)
  - Summer (DST): UTC+02:00 (CEST)
- INSEE/Postal code: 03293 /03360
- ^{1} French Land Register data, which excludes lakes, ponds, glaciers > 1 km^{2} (0.386 sq mi or 247 acres) and river estuaries.

Urçay (French pronunciation: [yʁsɛ]) is a commune in the Allier department in Auvergne-Rhône-Alpes in central France.

== Population ==
Historical population
Year	Pop.	±% p.a.
1968	428	—
1975	390	−1.32%
1982	324	−2.61%
1990	294	−1.21%
1999	298	+0.15%
2007	283	−0.64%
2012	304	+1.44%
2017	264	−2.78%
2023	296	+1.93%
Source: INSEE

== See also ==
- Communes of the Allier department
