= Neure =

- Commune
- Coat of arms
- Location of Neure
- Location within France Location within Auvergne-Rhône-Alpes
- Coordinates: 46°44′50″N 2°58′53″E
- Country: France
- Region: Auvergne-Rhône-Alpes
- Department: Allier
- Arrondissement: Moulins
- Canton: Bourbon-l'Archambault
- Intercommunality: CA Moulins Communauté

Government
  - Mayor (2026–32): Patricia Metenier
- Area^{1}: 11.97 km^{2} (4.62 sq mi)
- Elevation: 215 m (705 ft)
- Highest elevation: 234 m (768 ft)
- Lowest elevation: 190 m (620 ft)
- Population (2023): 202
  - Density: 16.9/km^{2} (43.7/sq mi)
- Time zone: UTC+01:00 (CET)
  - Summer (DST): UTC+02:00 (CEST)
- INSEE/Postal code: 03198 /03320
- ^{1} French Land Register data, which excludes lakes, ponds, glaciers > 1 km^{2} (0.386 sq mi or 247 acres) and river estuaries.

Neure (French pronunciation: [nœʁ]) is a commune in the Allier department in Auvergne in central France.

== Population ==
Historical population
Year	Pop.	±% p.a.
1968	222	—
1975	187	−2.42%
1982	168	−1.52%
1990	152	−1.24%
1999	166	+0.98%
2007	175	+0.66%
2012	175	+0.00%
2017	188	+1.44%
2023	202	+1.20%
Source: INSEE

== See also ==
- Communes of the Allier department
