= Theneuille =

- Commune
- Location of Theneuille
- Location within France Location within Auvergne-Rhône-Alpes
- Coordinates: 46°35′06″N 2°51′51″E
- Country: France
- Region: Auvergne-Rhône-Alpes
- Department: Allier
- Arrondissement: Montluçon
- Canton: Bourbon-l'Archambault
- Intercommunality: CC du Pays de Tronçais

Government
  - Mayor (2026–32): Denis Clerget
- Area^{1}: 39.73 km^{2} (15.34 sq mi)
- Elevation: 332 m (1,089 ft)
- Highest elevation: 391 m (1,283 ft)
- Lowest elevation: 247 m (810 ft)
- Population (2023): 340
  - Density: 8.6/km^{2} (22/sq mi)
- Time zone: UTC+01:00 (CET)
  - Summer (DST): UTC+02:00 (CEST)
- INSEE/Postal code: 03282 /03350
- ^{1} French Land Register data, which excludes lakes, ponds, glaciers > 1 km^{2} (0.386 sq mi or 247 acres) and river estuaries.

Theneuille (French pronunciation: [tənœj]) is a commune in the Allier department in Auvergne-Rhône-Alpes in central France.

== Population ==
Historical population
Year	Pop.	±% p.a.
1968	720	—
1975	581	−3.02%
1982	505	−1.98%
1990	449	−1.46%
1999	411	−0.98%
2007	398	−0.40%
2012	379	−0.97%
2017	365	−0.75%
2023	340	−1.18%
Source: INSEE

== See also ==
- Communes of the Allier department
