= Valigny =

- Commune
- Location of Valigny
- Location within France Location within Auvergne-Rhône-Alpes
- Coordinates: 46°42′46″N 2°49′05″E
- Country: France
- Region: Auvergne-Rhône-Alpes
- Department: Allier
- Arrondissement: Montluçon
- Canton: Bourbon-l'Archambault
- Intercommunality: CC du Pays de Tronçais

Government
  - Mayor (2026–32): Marie Thérèse Daldin
- Area^{1}: 21.18 km^{2} (8.18 sq mi)
- Elevation: 330 m (1,080 ft)
- Highest elevation: 278 m (912 ft)
- Lowest elevation: 211 m (692 ft)
- Population (2023): 378
  - Density: 17.8/km^{2} (46.2/sq mi)
- Time zone: UTC+01:00 (CET)
  - Summer (DST): UTC+02:00 (CEST)
- INSEE/Postal code: 03296 /03360
- ^{1} French Land Register data, which excludes lakes, ponds, glaciers > 1 km^{2} (0.386 sq mi or 247 acres) and river estuaries.

Valigny (French pronunciation: [valiɲi]) is a commune in the Allier department in Auvergne-Rhône-Alpes in central France.

== Population ==
Historical population
Year	Pop.	±% p.a.
1968	751	—
1975	639	−2.28%
1982	599	−0.92%
1990	527	−1.59%
1999	441	−1.96%
2007	402	−1.15%
2012	384	−0.91%
2017	376	−0.42%
2023	378	+0.09%
Source: INSEE

== See also ==
- Communes of the Allier department
