= Braize =

- Commune
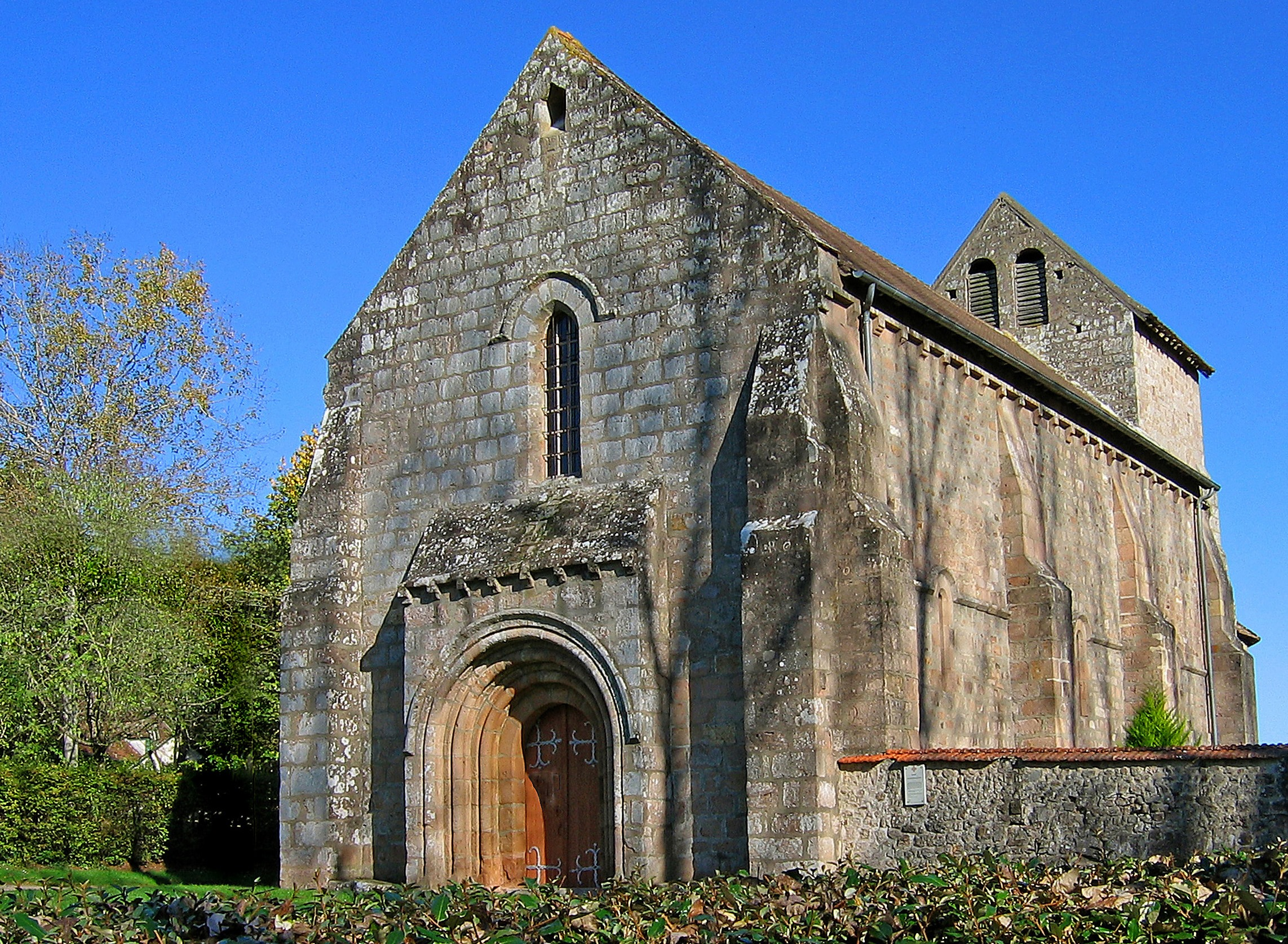
- The church in Braize
- Location of Braize
- Location within France Location within Auvergne-Rhône-Alpes
- Coordinates: 46°40′05″N 2°39′02″E
- Country: France
- Region: Auvergne-Rhône-Alpes
- Department: Allier
- Arrondissement: Montluçon
- Canton: Bourbon-l'Archambault
- Intercommunality: CC du Pays de Tronçais

Government
  - Mayor (2026–32): Jérémy Borderieux
- Area^{1}: 20.95 km^{2} (8.09 sq mi)
- Elevation: 230 m (750 ft)
- Highest elevation: 291 m (955 ft)
- Lowest elevation: 186 m (610 ft)
- Population (2023): 259
  - Density: 12.4/km^{2} (32.0/sq mi)
- Time zone: UTC+01:00 (CET)
  - Summer (DST): UTC+02:00 (CEST)
- INSEE/Postal code: 03037 /03360
- ^{1} French Land Register data, which excludes lakes, ponds, glaciers > 1 km^{2} (0.386 sq mi or 247 acres) and river estuaries.

Braize (French pronunciation: [bʁɛz]) is a commune in the Allier department in central France.

== Geography ==
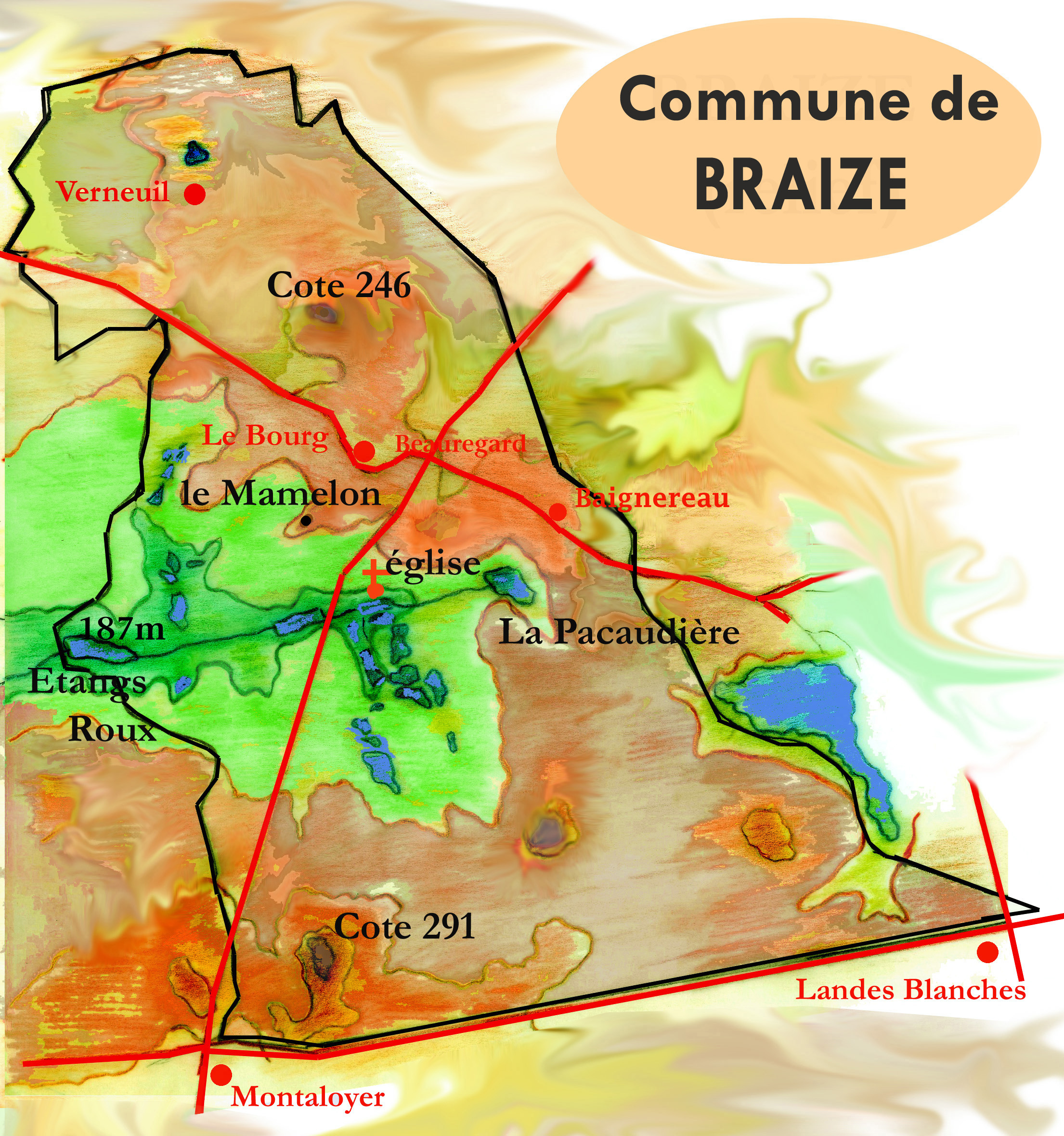
Map of Braize.

At its widest point, the commune is 8 km across, stretching from the Cher department to the Rond des Landes Blanches. It lies in a valley oriented east and west from La Pacaudière to Les Ris, the lowest point in the commune.

Much of the valley is swampy. It is drained by a brook that flows through several ponds. The lowest point in the commune is on the west.

On the south are the edges of the forest of Tronçais, dominated by several buttes at Rond du Haut du Parc and Puy Aigu, the highest point in the commune at Montaloyer.

On the north, a gentle slope rises to the present town, with its remarkable feudal motte Le Mamelon, close to the farm called La Commanderie. Northwest of Baignereau, the boundary is the river Sologne.

Beyond the village and to the edge of the commune, a slightly rolling plateau leads to the Verneuil vineyards, of which only a small part are still cultivated.

== Economy ==
In the 1930s, Braize had a half dozen vineyards of 30 to 40 hectares.

Currently, there are about a half dozen farms raising primarily cattle and sheep. Tourist activities include fishing and camping.

== Events ==
The traditional festival of the patron saint, La Saint Antoine, is celebrated January 17. The Foire aux ânes takes place the last Sunday in August.

== Population ==
Historical population

Year	Pop.	±% p.a.
1901	432	—
1906	507	+3.25%
1911	495	−0.48%
1921	378	−2.66%
1926	362	−0.86%
1931	359	−0.17%
1936	362	+0.17%
1946	334	−0.80%
1954	329	−0.19%
1962	310	−0.74%

Year	Pop.	±% p.a.
1968	326	+0.84%
1975	307	−0.85%
1982	275	−1.56%
1990	254	−0.99%
1999	257	+0.13%
2007	279	+1.03%
2012	283	+0.29%
2017	257	−1.91%
2023	259	+0.13%

Source: EHESS and INSEE

== See also ==
- Communes of the Allier department
