= Cérilly, Allier =

Cérilly
- Commune
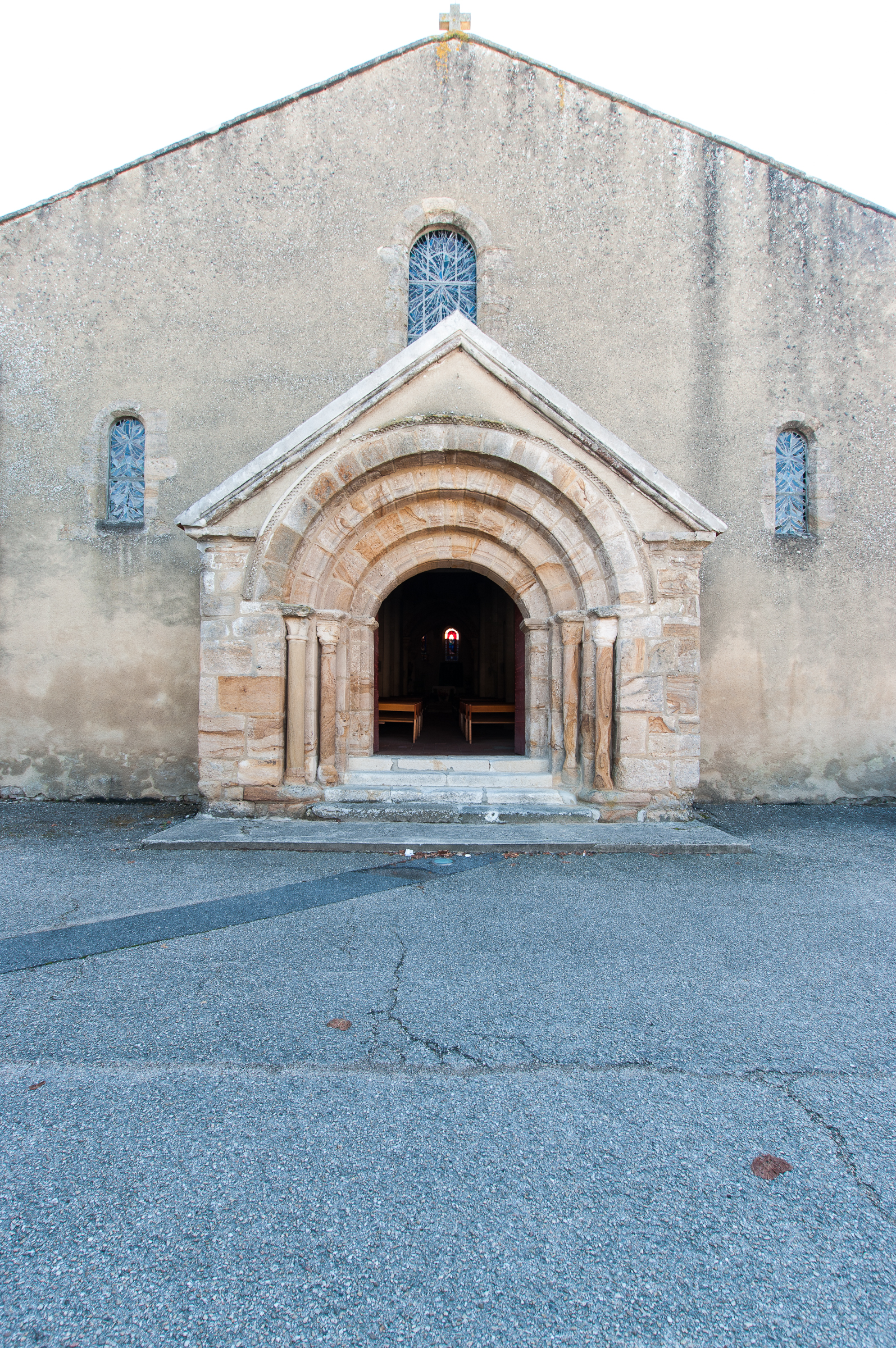
- The church in Cérilly

- Coat of arms
- Location of Cérilly
- Location within France Location within Auvergne-Rhône-Alpes
- Coordinates: 46°37′07″N 2°49′18″E
- Country: France
- Region: Auvergne-Rhône-Alpes
- Department: Allier
- Arrondissement: Montluçon
- Canton: Bourbon-l'Archambault
- Intercommunality: CC du Pays de Tronçais

Government
  - Mayor (2026–32): Fabien Thevenoux
- Area^{1}: 70.55 km^{2} (27.24 sq mi)
- Elevation: 330 m (1,080 ft)
- Highest elevation: 397 m (1,302 ft)
- Lowest elevation: 228 m (748 ft)
- Population (2023): 1,316
  - Density: 18.65/km^{2} (48.31/sq mi)
- Time zone: UTC+01:00 (CET)
  - Summer (DST): UTC+02:00 (CEST)
- INSEE/Postal code: 03048 /03350
- ^{1} French Land Register data, which excludes lakes, ponds, glaciers > 1 km^{2} (0.386 sq mi or 247 acres) and river estuaries.

Cérilly (French pronunciation: [seʁiji]) is a commune in the Allier department in central France.

It is in close proximity to the largest and oldest untouched oak forest in western Europe: the Forest of Tronçais. Many oak trees exceed 250 years in age. The Tronçais (pronounced: Tronssay) forest was first planted during the 13th century and used continuously since the late 17th century and until the early 19th century to supply masts and spars to the old French navy. It is now a state forest which supplies much of the choice oak used in making the best wine barrels that are used mostly in Burgundy.

== Geography ==
Cérilly is located in the bocage bourbonnais natural region, spanning a sixth of la Forêt de Tronçais.

== Population ==
Historical population
Year	Pop.	±% p.a.
1968	1,958	—
1975	1,956	−0.01%
1982	1,820	−1.02%
1990	1,591	−1.67%
1999	1,568	−0.16%
2007	1,384	−1.55%
2012	1,324	−0.88%
2017	1,311	−0.20%
2023	1,316	+0.06%
Source: INSEE

== See also ==
- Communes of the Allier department
