= Canton of Bourbon-l'Archambault =

Coordinates: 46°35′03″N 3°03′26″E

Bourbon-l'Archambault
- Canton
- Interactive map of Bourbon-l'Archambault
- Country: France
- Region: Auvergne-Rhône-Alpes
- Department: Allier
- No. of communes: {{{nbcomm}}}
- Area: 956.97 km^{2} (369.49 sq mi)
- Population (2023): 16,478
  - Density: 17.219/km^{2} (44.597/sq mi)
- INSEE code: 03 02

The canton of Bourbon-l'Archambault is an administrative division in central France. At the French canton reorganisation which came into effect in March 2015, the canton was expanded from 8 to 29 communes (2 of which merged into the new commune Meaulne-Vitray):

1. Ainay-le-Château
2. Bourbon-l'Archambault
3. Braize
4. Buxières-les-Mines
5. Cérilly
6. Château-sur-Allier
7. Couleuvre
8. Couzon
9. Franchesse
10. Isle-et-Bardais
11. Lételon
12. Limoise
13. Lurcy-Lévis
14. Meaulne-Vitray
15. Neure
16. Pouzy-Mésangy
17. Saint-Aubin-le-Monial
18. Saint-Bonnet-Tronçais
19. Saint-Hilaire
20. Saint-Léopardin-d'Augy
21. Saint-Plaisir
22. Theneuille
23. Urçay
24. Valigny
25. Le Veurdre
26. Vieure
27. Le Vilhain
28. Ygrande

== Demographics ==
Historical population
Year	Pop.	±% p.a.
2013	16,788	—
2018	16,681	−0.13%
Source: INSEE

== See also ==
- Cantons of the Allier department
- Communes of France
