= Canton of Hérisson =

Coordinates: 46°30′34″N 2°42′44″E

Hérisson
- Former canton
- Interactive map of Hérisson
- Country: France
- Region: Auvergne-Rhône-Alpes
- Department: Allier
- No. of communes: {{{nbcomm}}}
- Disbanded: 2015
- Area: 435.22 km^{2} (168.04 sq mi)
- Population (2012): 8,955
  - Density: 20.58/km^{2} (53.29/sq mi)

The canton of Hérisson is a former administrative division in central France. It was disbanded following the French canton reorganisation which came into effect in March 2015. It consisted of 17 communes, which joined the canton of Huriel in 2015. It had 8,955 inhabitants (2012).

The canton comprised the following communes:

- Audes
- Bizeneuille
- Le Brethon
- Cosne-d'Allier
- Estivareilles
- Givarlais
- Hérisson
- Louroux-Bourbonnais
- Louroux-Hodement
- Maillet
- Nassigny
- Reugny
- Saint-Caprais
- Sauvagny
- Tortezais
- Vallon-en-Sully
- Venas

== Demographics ==
Historical population Canton of Hérisson
Year	1962	1968	1975	1982	1990	1999
Pop.	9,341	10,262	9,697	9,822	9,461	9,035
±%	—	+9.9%	−5.5%	+1.3%	−3.7%	−4.5%
From the year 1962 on: No double counting – residents of multiple communes (e.g. students and military personnel) are counted only once. Source: INSEE

== See also ==
- Cantons of the Allier department
