= Arrondissement of Montluçon =

Coordinates: 46.33°N 2.60°E

Montluçon
- Arrondissement
- Location within the department Allier
- Country: France
- Region: Auvergne-Rhône-Alpes
- Department: Allier
- No. of communes: {{{nbcomm}}}
- Area: 2,172.0 km^{2} (838.6 sq mi)
- Population (2023): 104,414
  - Density: 48.073/km^{2} (124.51/sq mi)
- INSEE code: 031

The arrondissement of Montluçon is an arrondissement of France in the Allier department in the Auvergne-Rhône-Alpes region. It has 90 communes. Its population is 105,280 (2021), and its area is 2,172.0 km^{2} (838.6 sq mi).

== Composition ==
The communes of the arrondissement of Montluçon, and their INSEE codes, are:

1. Ainay-le-Château (03003)
2. Archignat (03005)
3. Arpheuilles-Saint-Priest (03007)
4. Audes (03010)
5. Beaune-d'Allier (03020)
6. Bézenet (03027)
7. Bizeneuille (03031)
8. Blomard (03032)
9. Braize (03037)
10. Le Brethon (03041)
11. La Celle (03047)
12. Cérilly (03048)
13. Chambérat (03051)
14. Chamblet (03052)
15. La Chapelaude (03055)
16. Chappes (03058)
17. Chavenon (03070)
18. Chazemais (03072)
19. Colombier (03081)
20. Commentry (03082)
21. Cosne-d'Allier (03084)
22. Couleuvre (03087)
23. Courçais (03088)
24. Deneuille-les-Mines (03097)
25. Désertines (03098)
26. Domérat (03101)
27. Doyet (03104)
28. Durdat-Larequille (03106)
29. Estivareilles (03111)
30. Haut-Bocage (03158)
31. Hérisson (03127)
32. Huriel (03128)
33. Hyds (03129)
34. Isle-et-Bardais (03130)
35. Lamaids (03136)
36. Lavault-Sainte-Anne (03140)
37. Lételon (03143)
38. Lignerolles (03145)
39. Louroux-de-Beaune (03151)
40. Malicorne (03159)
41. Marcillat-en-Combraille (03161)
42. Mazirat (03167)
43. Meaulne-Vitray (03168)
44. Mesples (03172)
45. Montluçon (03185)
46. Montmarault (03186)
47. Montvicq (03189)
48. Murat (03191)
49. Nassigny (03193)
50. Néris-les-Bains (03195)
51. La Petite-Marche (03206)
52. Prémilhat (03211)
53. Quinssaines (03212)
54. Reugny (03213)
55. Ronnet (03216)
56. Saint-Angel (03217)
57. Saint-Bonnet-Tronçais (03221)
58. Saint-Bonnet-de-Four (03219)
59. Saint-Caprais (03222)
60. Saint-Désiré (03225)
61. Saint-Éloy-d'Allier (03228)
62. Sainte-Thérence (03261)
63. Saint-Fargeol (03231)
64. Saint-Genest (03233)
65. Saint-Marcel-en-Marcillat (03244)
66. Saint-Marcel-en-Murat (03243)
67. Saint-Martinien (03246)
68. Saint-Palais (03249)
69. Saint-Priest-en-Murat (03256)
70. Saint-Sauvier (03259)
71. Saint-Victor (03262)
72. Sauvagny (03269)
73. Sazeret (03270)
74. Teillet-Argenty (03279)
75. Terjat (03280)
76. Theneuille (03282)
77. Tortezais (03285)
78. Treignat (03288)
79. Urçay (03293)
80. Valigny (03296)
81. Vallon-en-Sully (03297)
82. Vaux (03301)
83. Venas (03303)
84. Verneix (03305)
85. Vernusse (03308)
86. Le Vilhain (03313)
87. Villebret (03314)
88. Villefranche-d'Allier (03315)
89. Viplaix (03317)
90. Voussac (03319)

== History ==
The arrondissement of Montluçon was created in 1800. At the January 2017 reorganization of the arrondissements of Allier, it lost 14 communes to the arrondissement of Vichy. At the January 2024 reorganization of the arrondissements of Allier, it lost one commune to the arrondissement of Moulins and it gained two from the arrondissement of Moulins.

As a result of the reorganisation of the cantons of France which came into effect in 2015, the borders of the cantons are no longer related to the borders of the arrondissements. The cantons of the arrondissement of Montluçon were, as of January 2015:

1. Cérilly
2. Commentry
3. Domérat-Montluçon-Nord-Ouest
4. Ébreuil
5. Hérisson
6. Huriel
7. Marcillat-en-Combraille
8. Montluçon-Est
9. Montluçon-Nord-Est
10. Montluçon-Ouest
11. Montluçon-Sud
12. Montmarault
