= Archignat =

- Commune
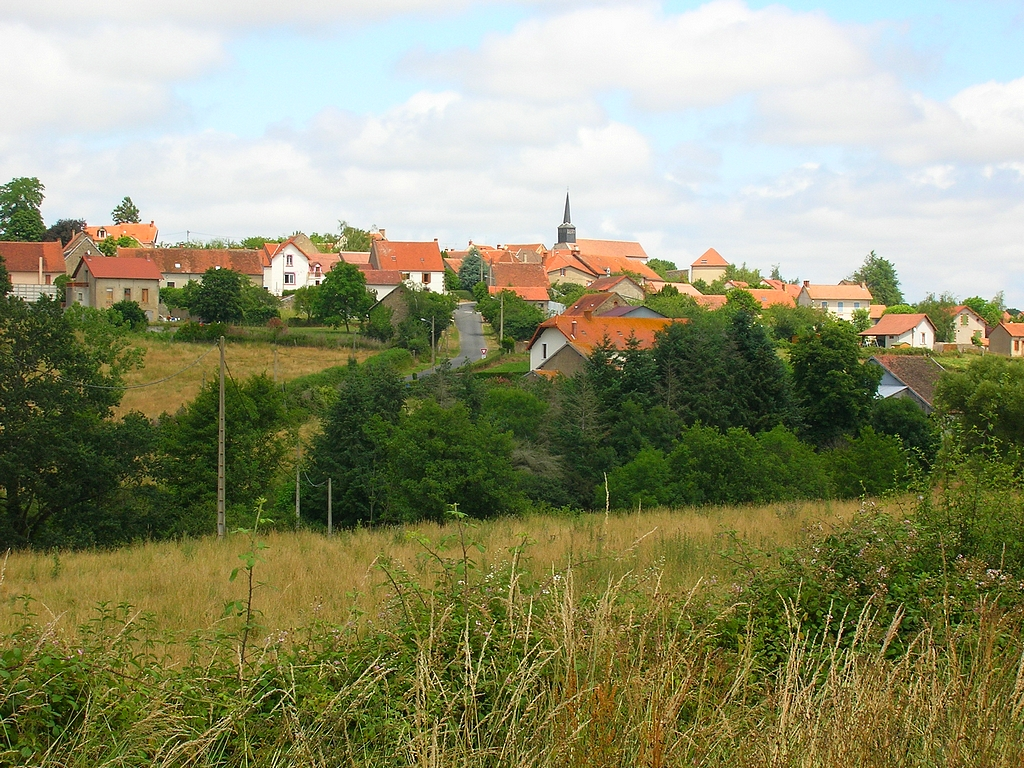
- A general view of Archignat

- Coat of arms
- Location of Archignat
- Location within France Location within Auvergne-Rhône-Alpes
- Coordinates: 46°22′22″N 2°25′30″E
- Country: France
- Region: Auvergne-Rhône-Alpes
- Department: Allier
- Arrondissement: Montluçon
- Canton: Huriel
- Intercommunality: Pays d'Huriel

Government
  - Mayor (2026–32): Jérôme Coulanjon
- Area^{1}: 24.35 km^{2} (9.40 sq mi)
- Elevation: 359 m (1,178 ft)
- Highest elevation: 567 m (1,860 ft)
- Lowest elevation: 329 m (1,079 ft)
- Population (2023): 321
  - Density: 13.2/km^{2} (34.1/sq mi)
- Time zone: UTC+01:00 (CET)
  - Summer (DST): UTC+02:00 (CEST)
- INSEE/Postal code: 03005 /03380
- ^{1} French Land Register data, which excludes lakes, ponds, glaciers > 1 km^{2} (0.386 sq mi or 247 acres) and river estuaries.

Archignat (French pronunciation: [aʁʃiɲa]; Occitan: Archinhac) is a commune in the Allier department in the Auvergne-Rhône-Alpes region of central France.

The inhabitants of the commune are known as Archignacois or Archignacoises in French.

== Geography ==
Archignat is located some 12 kilometres (7.5 mi) west by north-west of Montluçon and 6 kilometres (3.7 mi) east of Treignat. Access to the commune is by the D916 road from Montluçon in the east passing through the heart of the commune and the village and continuing to Boussac in the west. There are also the D150 road from the village to Chambérat in the north, the D309 road from the village to the south, the D148 road going west to Saint-Sauvier, and the D150 road going south-west towards Saint-Martinien. The railway from Montluçon passes through the commune with a station just south of the village. Apart from two forests in the north-west and south, the commune is entirely farmland.

La Magieure river passes through the commune from west to east passing south of the village with the Ruisseau du Liat flowing from the south into it forming part of the eastern border of the commune. La Meuzelle river forms part of the northern border of the commune flowing north-east.

The highest point in the Arrondissement of Montluçon is located in the commune at a place called Signal de l'Age (Signal of the Ages) (572 metres (1,877 ft)). From here, on a clear day, the towers of Bourges Cathedral to the north and the Chaîne des Puys and the Monts Dore to the south can be seen.

== History ==
The name of Archignat originates from a Latin anthroponym Arcanius (according to Albert Dauzat) or is derived from the oronymic roots cin or Chigne. The form Archiniaco appeared in 1070 and Archignac in the 13th century.

The common resulted from the merger in 1802 of Archignat and Frontenat. Archignat had 758 inhabitants in 1891.

The Terrier de la Mule, 2 kilometres (1.2 mi) from the present town, was the first location of the village: the remains of foundations of a square tower with ditches attest to this assertion but it is not verified.

== Administration ==
List of Successive Mayors

| From | To | Name |
|---|---|---|
| 1945 | 1977 | Edmond Bardot |
| 1977 | 2008 | Jacques Massy |
| 2008 | 2014 | Isabelle Binon |
| 2014 | 2020 | Robert Muglia |
| 2020 | Current | Jérôme Coulanjon |

== Population ==
Historical population
| Year | Pop. | ±% p.a. |
|---|---|---|
| 1968 | 345 | — |
| 1975 | 306 | −1.70% |
| 1982 | 271 | −1.72% |
| 1990 | 275 | +0.18% |
| 1999 | 350 | +2.72% |
| 2007 | 346 | −0.14% |
| 2012 | 351 | +0.29% |
| 2017 | 336 | −0.87% |
| 2023 | 321 | −0.76% |
Source: INSEE

== Sites and Monuments ==
- The Girauds Stones.
- The Plaids Stones.
- The Cross of Ages (15th century) is classified as a historical monument.
- The Church of Saint-Sulpice from the 13th and 19th century. The church contains a Commemorative Plaque by William of Aaures (15th century) which is registered as an historical object.
- The Church of Saint-Pardoux at Frontenat (Middle Ages) is classified as a historical monument.
- A disused Fountain near the church at Frontenat surmounted by a niche containing a reliquary bust dedicated to Saint Peter.
- The Lapidary testament of William of Aaures dating from 1416 is located in the Archignat church. the Lordship of Aaures was on the territory of the commune.
- A Mound at Malleret (or Mallereix): the circular mound is about 25m in diameter with a double moat around it.
- The Choux Chalet (free guided tour by appointment).

=== Picture Gallery ===
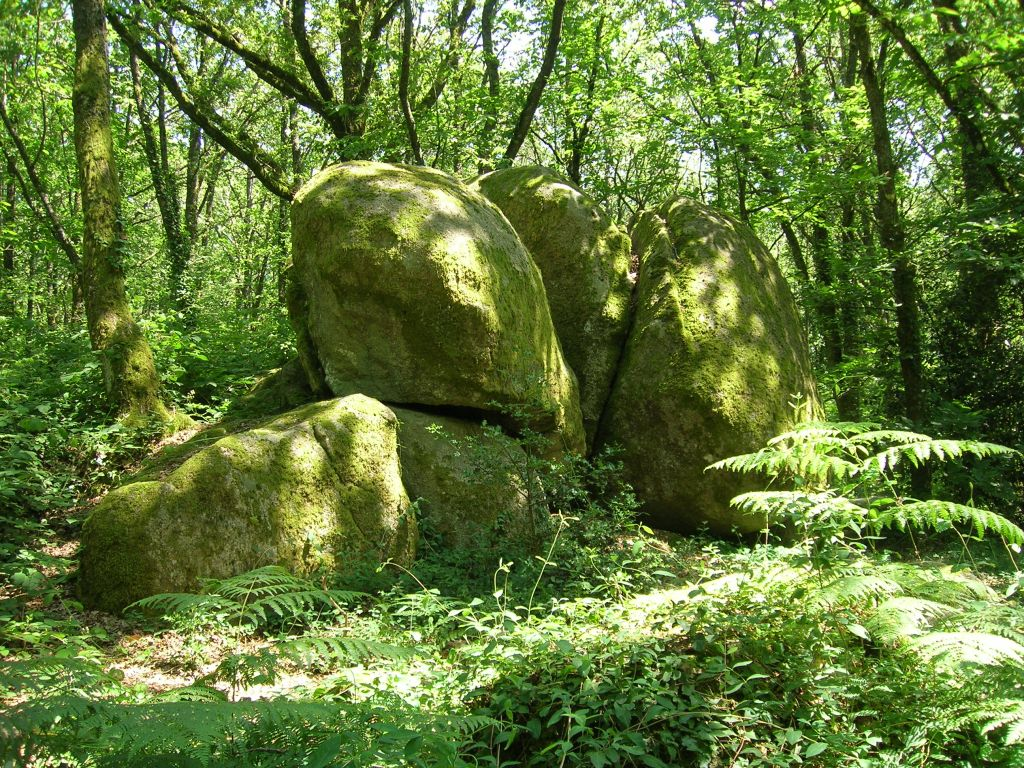
The Girauds Stones.

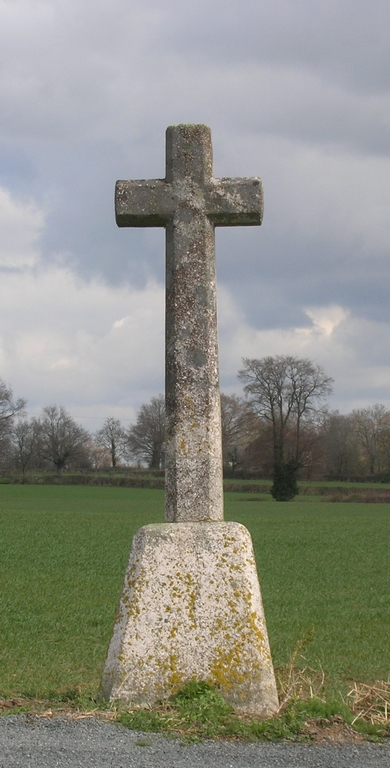
The Cross of Ages.

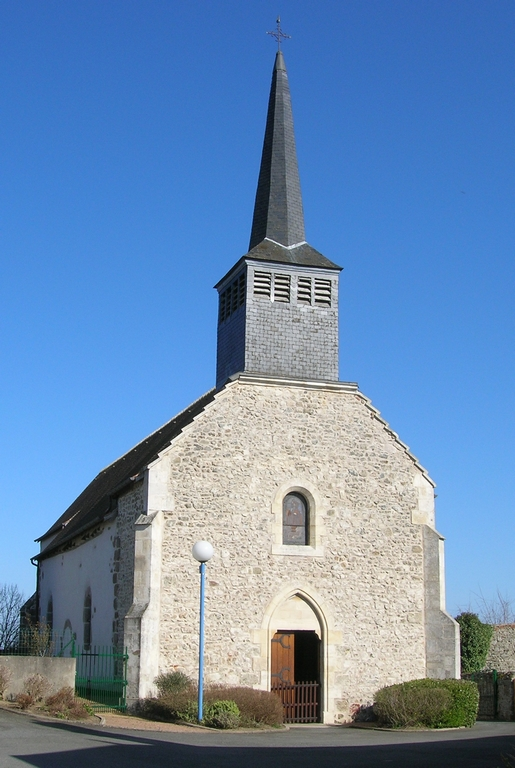
The Church of Saint-Sulpice at Archignat.

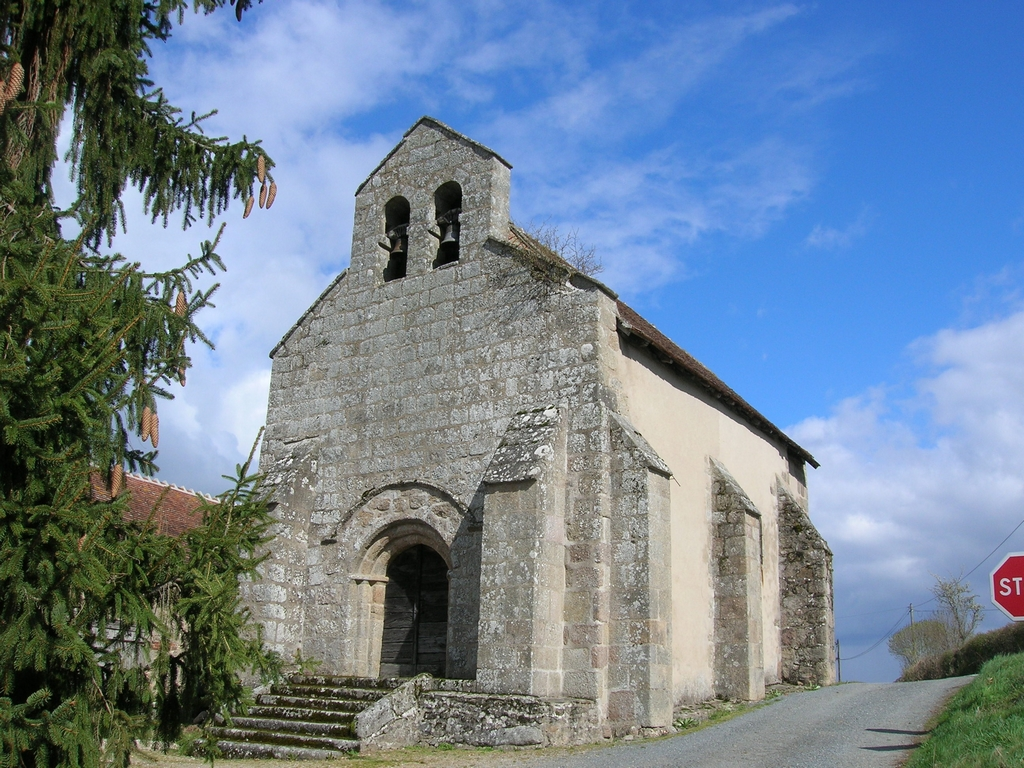
The Church of Saint-Pardoux at Frontenat.

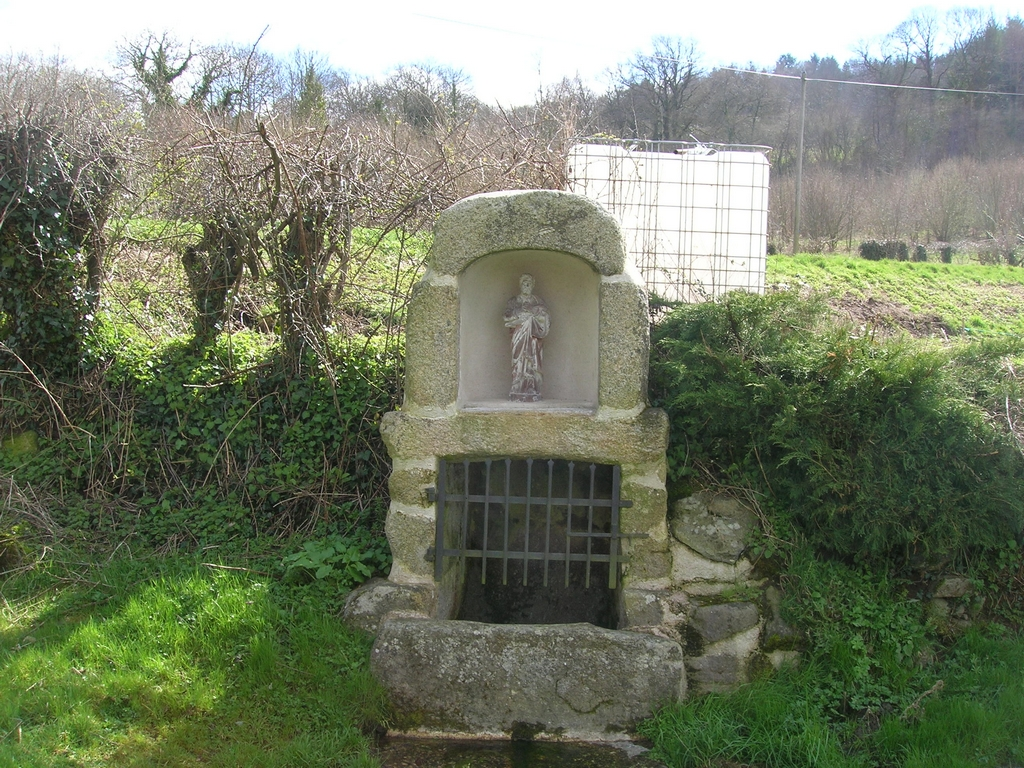
The Disused Fountain.

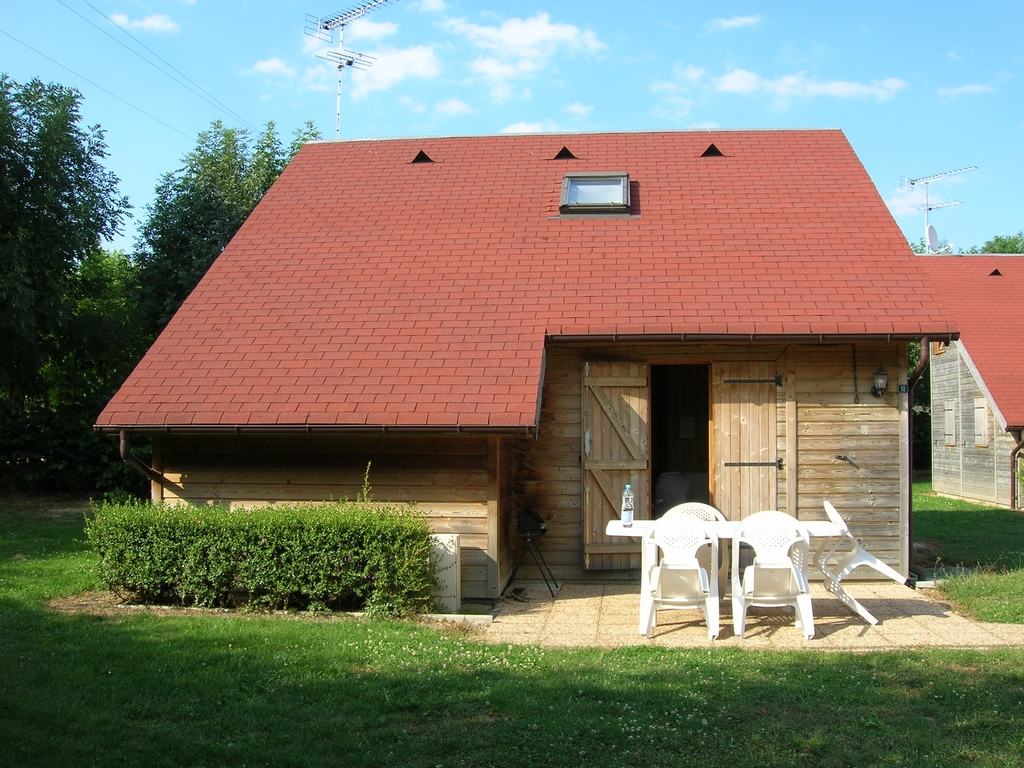
The Choux Chalet.

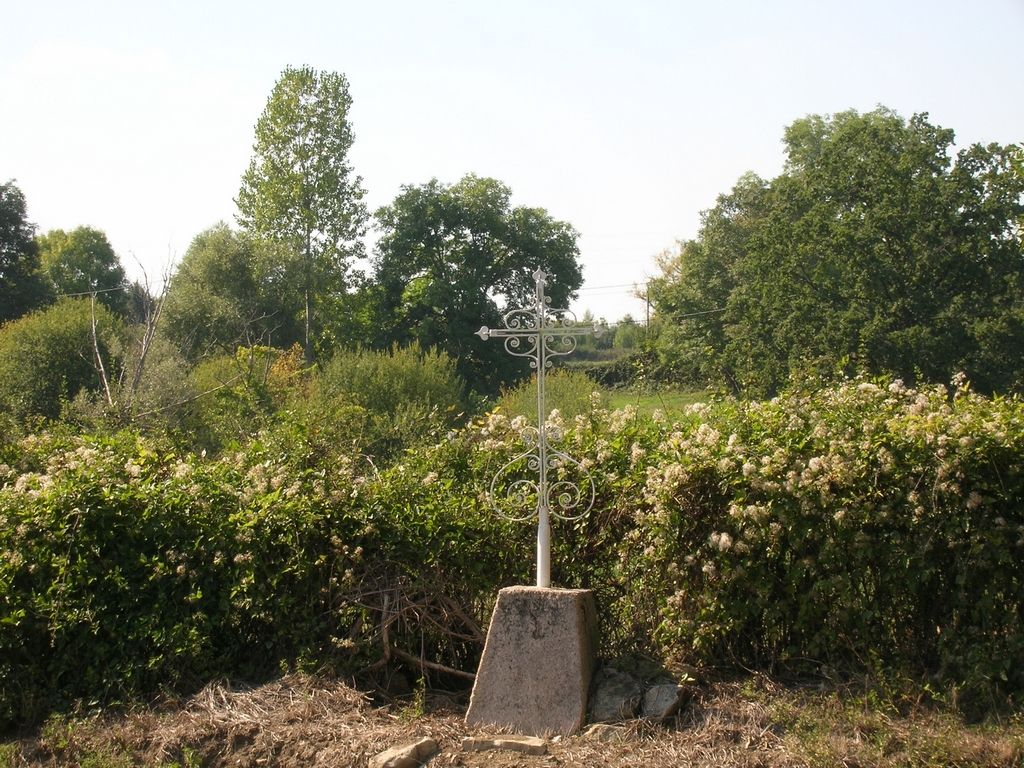
The Bonnet Wayside Cross.

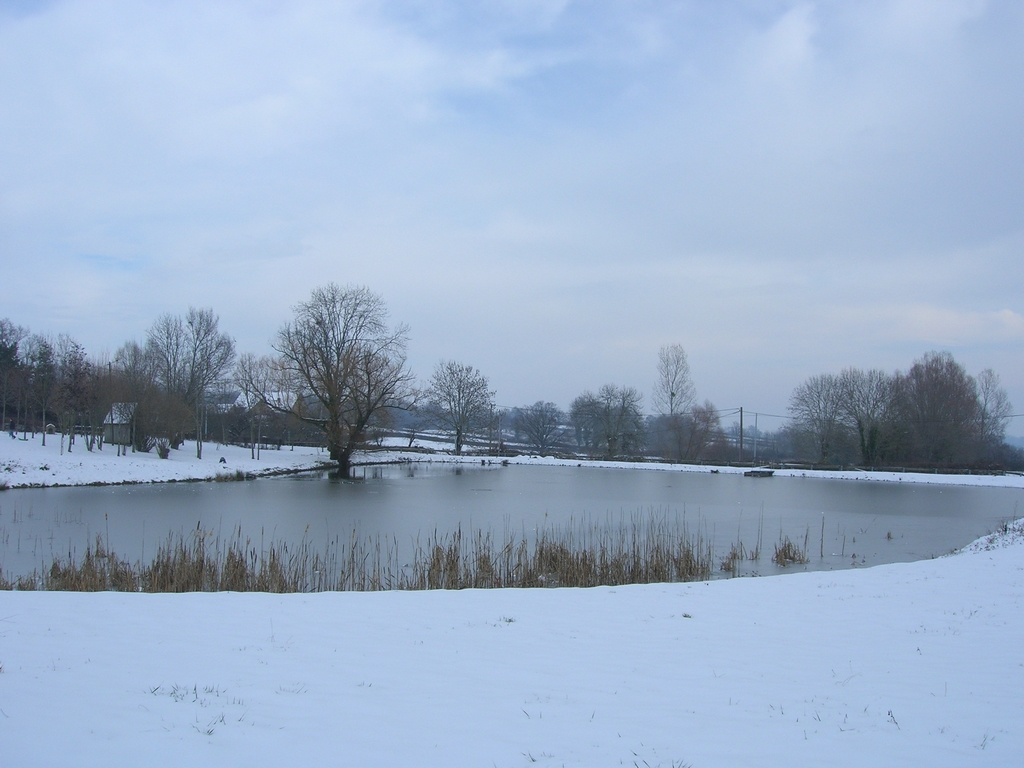
"La Pêcherie" artificial lake under snow.

== Sports and Recreation ==
- Fitness trail
- Mini-golf
- Tennis courts
- Hiking trails
- Skating rink
- Football and Basketball field
- Bowling Alley
- Fishing Lake "La Pêcherie"

== See also ==
- Communes of the Allier department
