= Estivareilles =

Estivareilles may refer to the following places in France:

- Estivareilles, Allier, a commune in the department of Allier
- Estivareilles, Loire, a commune in the department of Loire
