= Lucien Lamoureux (France) =

French politician (1888–1970)

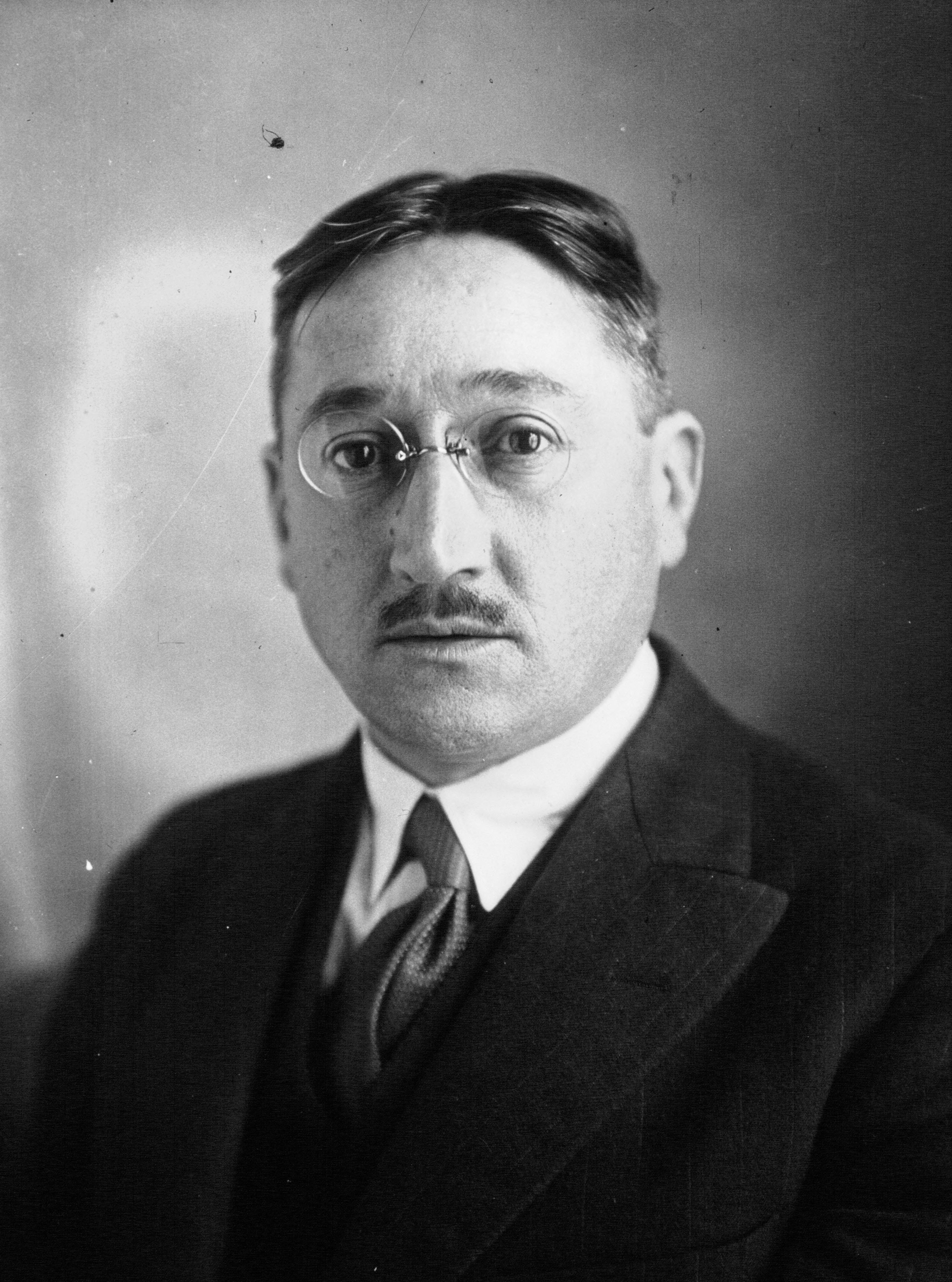
- Lucien Lamoureux in 1929
- Born: 16 September 1888; Viplaix, France
- Died: 5 August 1970 (aged 81); Creuzier-le-Vieux, France
- Occupation: Politician

Lucien Lamoureux (16 September 1888, Viplaix – 5 August 1970, Creuzier-le-Vieux) was a French politician. He belonged to the Radical Party. At various times in the 1930s, he was the French Minister of Colonies, Labour, Commerce, and Finance.

On 10 July 1940, Lamoureux voted in favour of granting the cabinet presided by Marchal Philippe Pétain authority to draw up a new constitution, thereby effectively ending the French Third Republic and establishing Vichy France. In 1941, he was made a member of the National Council of Vichy France.
