= Hérisson (disambiguation) =

Hérisson is a commune in the Allier department, France.

Hérisson may also refer to:

- Canton of Hérisson, former administrative division in Allier, France
- Hérisson (river), a tributary of the Ain in Jura, France

== People with the surname ==
- Aurélien Hérisson (born 1990), French Brazilian footballer
- Pierre Hérisson (1945–2025), French politician
- William Herisson (1894 - 1969), French World War I flying ace

== See also ==
- Pougne-Hérisson, French commune
