= Saint-Palais =

Saint-Palais is the name or part of the name of several communes in France:

Name	Area (km^{2})	Population	Département
Saint-Palais	7.44	1,874	Pyrénées-Atlantiques
Saint-Palais	26.12	626	Cher
Saint-Palais	9.76	481	Gironde
Saint-Palais	20.3	174	Allier
Saint-Palais-sur-Mer	15.69	3890	Charente-Maritime
Saint-Palais-du-Né	13.6	272	Charente
Saint-Palais-de-Négrignac	18.51	384	Charente-Maritime
Saint-Palais-de-Phiolin	11.01	247	Charente-Maritime
