= Huriel =

- Commune
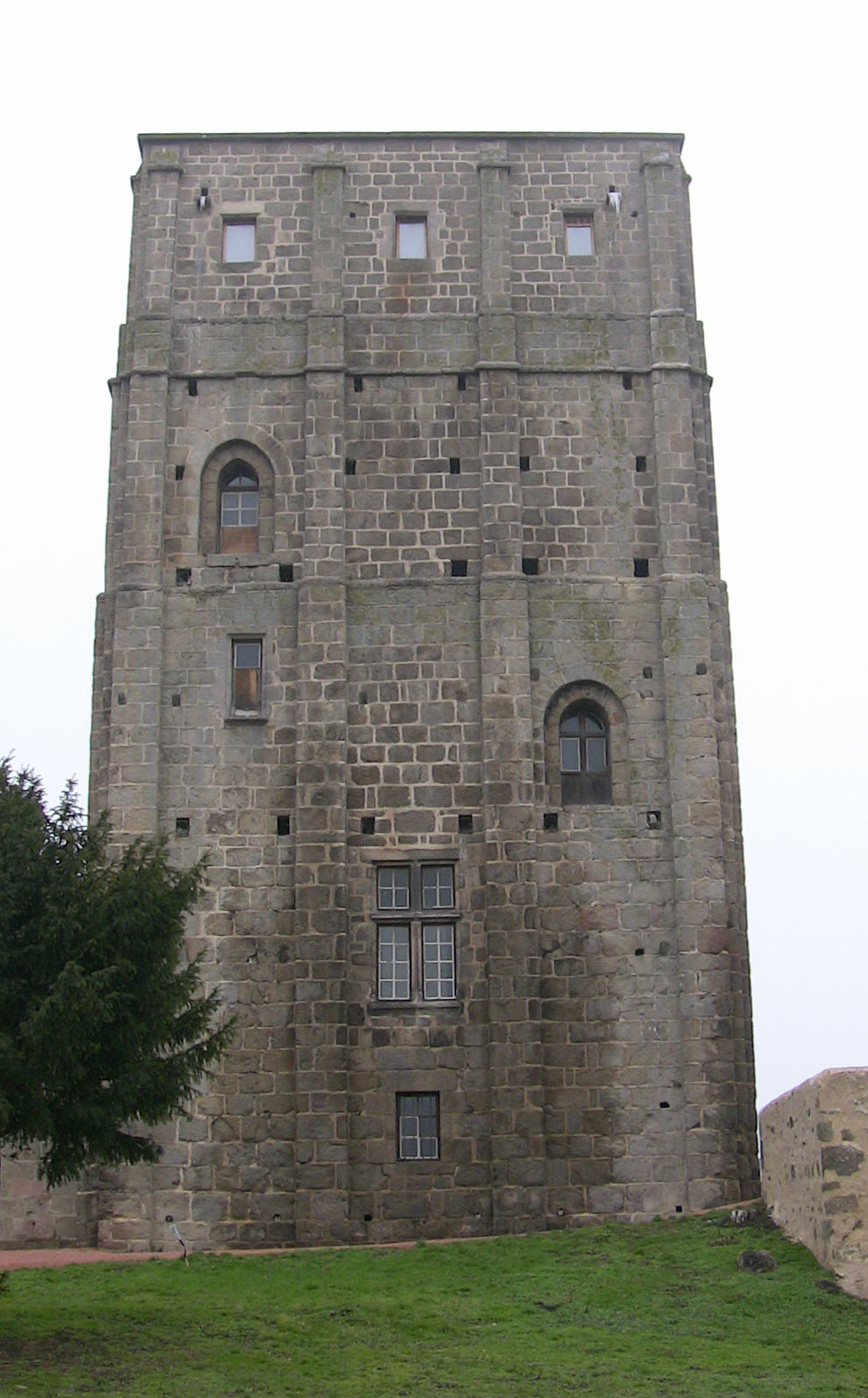
- Romanesque keep

- Coat of arms
- Location of Huriel
- Location within France Location within Auvergne-Rhône-Alpes
- Coordinates: 46°22′26″N 2°28′39″E
- Country: France
- Region: Auvergne-Rhône-Alpes
- Department: Allier
- Arrondissement: Montluçon
- Canton: Huriel
- Intercommunality: Pays d'Huriel

Government
  - Mayor (2026–32): Stéphane Abranowitch
- Area^{1}: 34.92 km^{2} (13.48 sq mi)
- Elevation: 332 m (1,089 ft)
- Highest elevation: 418 m (1,371 ft)
- Lowest elevation: 210 m (690 ft)
- Population (2023): 2,536
  - Density: 72.62/km^{2} (188.1/sq mi)
- Time zone: UTC+01:00 (CET)
  - Summer (DST): UTC+02:00 (CEST)
- INSEE/Postal code: 03128 /03380
- ^{1} French Land Register data, which excludes lakes, ponds, glaciers > 1 km^{2} (0.386 sq mi or 247 acres) and river estuaries.

Huriel (French pronunciation: [yʁjɛl]; Occitan: Uriac) is a commune in the Allier department in central France.

== Population ==
Historical population
Year	Pop.	±% p.a.
1968	2,237	—
1975	2,147	−0.58%
1982	2,347	+1.28%
1990	2,606	+1.32%
1999	2,377	−1.02%
2007	2,460	+0.43%
2012	2,663	+1.60%
2017	2,646	−0.13%
2023	2,536	−0.71%
Source: INSEE

== See also ==
- Communes of the Allier department
