= Courçais =

- Commune
- Location of Courçais
- Location within France Location within Auvergne-Rhône-Alpes
- Coordinates: 46°28′17″N 2°26′11″E
- Country: France
- Region: Auvergne-Rhône-Alpes
- Department: Allier
- Arrondissement: Montluçon
- Canton: Huriel
- Intercommunality: Pays d'Huriel

Government
  - Mayor (2026–32): Jérôme Desmaretz
- Area^{1}: 26.51 km^{2} (10.24 sq mi)
- Elevation: 337 m (1,106 ft)
- Highest elevation: 394 m (1,293 ft)
- Lowest elevation: 253 m (830 ft)
- Population (2023): 314
  - Density: 11.8/km^{2} (30.7/sq mi)
- Time zone: UTC+01:00 (CET)
  - Summer (DST): UTC+02:00 (CEST)
- INSEE/Postal code: 03088 /03370
- ^{1} French Land Register data, which excludes lakes, ponds, glaciers > 1 km^{2} (0.386 sq mi or 247 acres) and river estuaries.

Courçais (French pronunciation: [kuʁsɛ]; Occitan: Corsai) is a commune in the Allier department in central France.

== Population ==
Historical population
| Year | Pop. | ±% p.a. |
|---|---|---|
| 1968 | 474 | — |
| 1975 | 385 | −2.93% |
| 1982 | 345 | −1.55% |
| 1990 | 311 | −1.29% |
| 1999 | 310 | −0.04% |
| 2007 | 297 | −0.53% |
| 2012 | 341 | +2.80% |
| 2017 | 325 | −0.96% |
| 2023 | 314 | −0.57% |
Source: INSEE

== See also ==
- Communes of the Allier department
