= La Chapelaude =

- Commune
- Coat of arms
- Location of La Chapelaude
- Location within France Location within Auvergne-Rhône-Alpes
- Coordinates: 46°25′15″N 2°30′20″E
- Country: France
- Region: Auvergne-Rhône-Alpes
- Department: Allier
- Arrondissement: Montluçon
- Canton: Huriel
- Intercommunality: Pays d'Huriel

Government
  - Mayor (2026–32): Olivier Arroyo
- Area^{1}: 28.6 km^{2} (11.0 sq mi)
- Elevation: 241 m (791 ft)
- Highest elevation: 380 m (1,250 ft)
- Lowest elevation: 197 m (646 ft)
- Population (2023): 938
  - Density: 32.8/km^{2} (84.9/sq mi)
- Time zone: UTC+01:00 (CET)
  - Summer (DST): UTC+02:00 (CEST)
- INSEE/Postal code: 03055 /03380
- ^{1} French Land Register data, which excludes lakes, ponds, glaciers > 1 km^{2} (0.386 sq mi or 247 acres) and river estuaries.

La Chapelaude (French pronunciation: [la ʃaplod]; Occitan: La Chapelauda) is a commune in the Allier department in central France.

== Population ==
Historical population
Year	Pop.	±% p.a.
1968	881	—
1975	861	−0.33%
1982	860	−0.02%
1990	982	+1.67%
1999	954	−0.32%
2007	970	+0.21%
2012	975	+0.10%
2017	1,007	+0.65%
2023	938	−1.18%
Source: INSEE

== See also ==
- Communes of the Allier department
