= Château de Petit-Bois =

19th-century mansion in Auvergne, France

Coordinates: 46°28′29″N 2°50′16″E

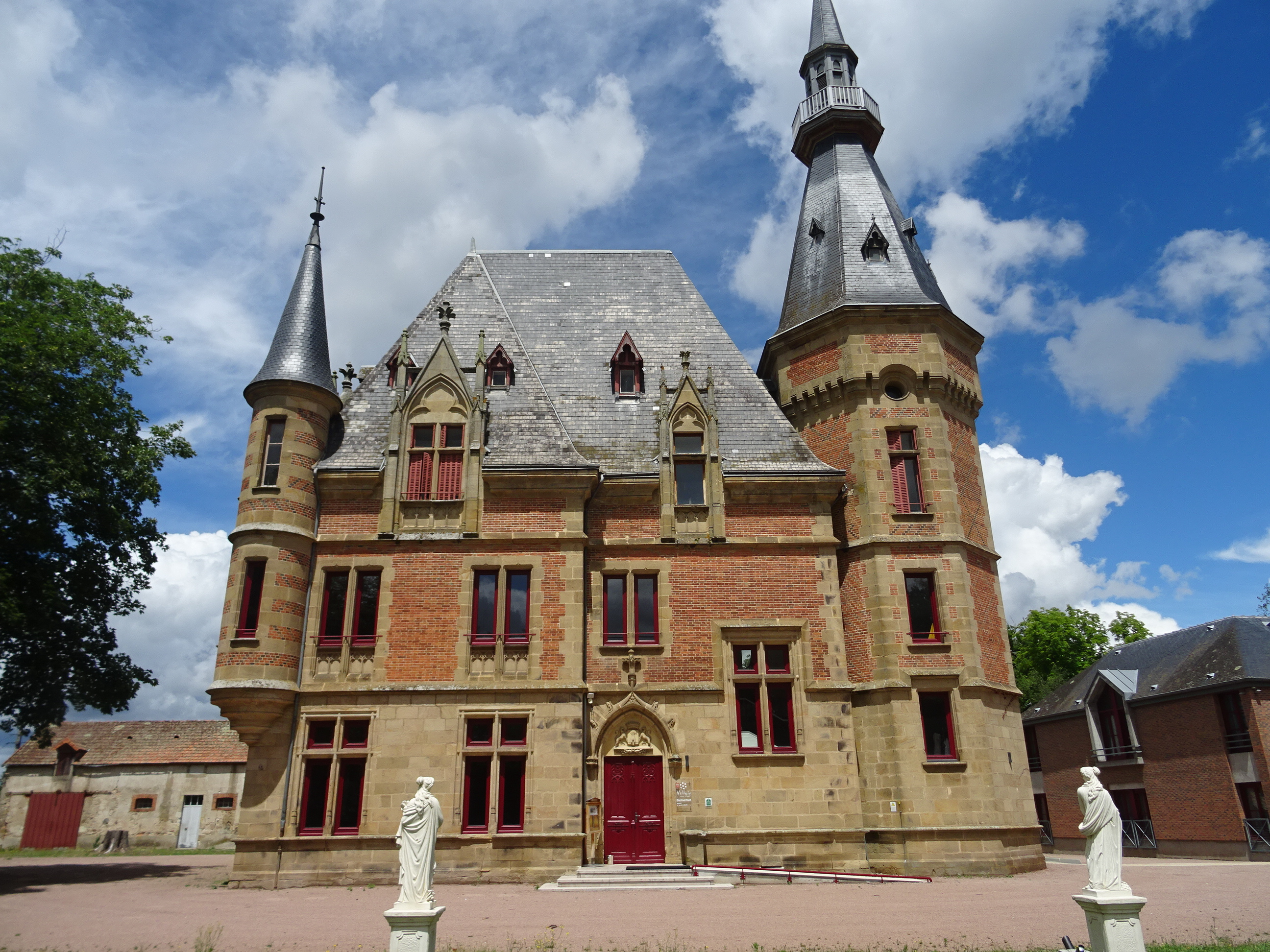
Château de Petit Bois, viewed from the south in 2022

The Château de Petit-Bois (French pronunciation: [ʃɑto də pəti bwa]) is a 19th-century mansion in Cosne-d'Allier in the Allier department in the Auvergne region of France.

The château was noted for the design of the park, which by the use of an artificial channel and a screen of trees, gave it the appearance of standing on an island. Its former grounds have been destroyed, however.

- Summed up and translated from the equivalent article at French Wikipédia, 6 November 2007
