= Saint-Désiré =

- Commune
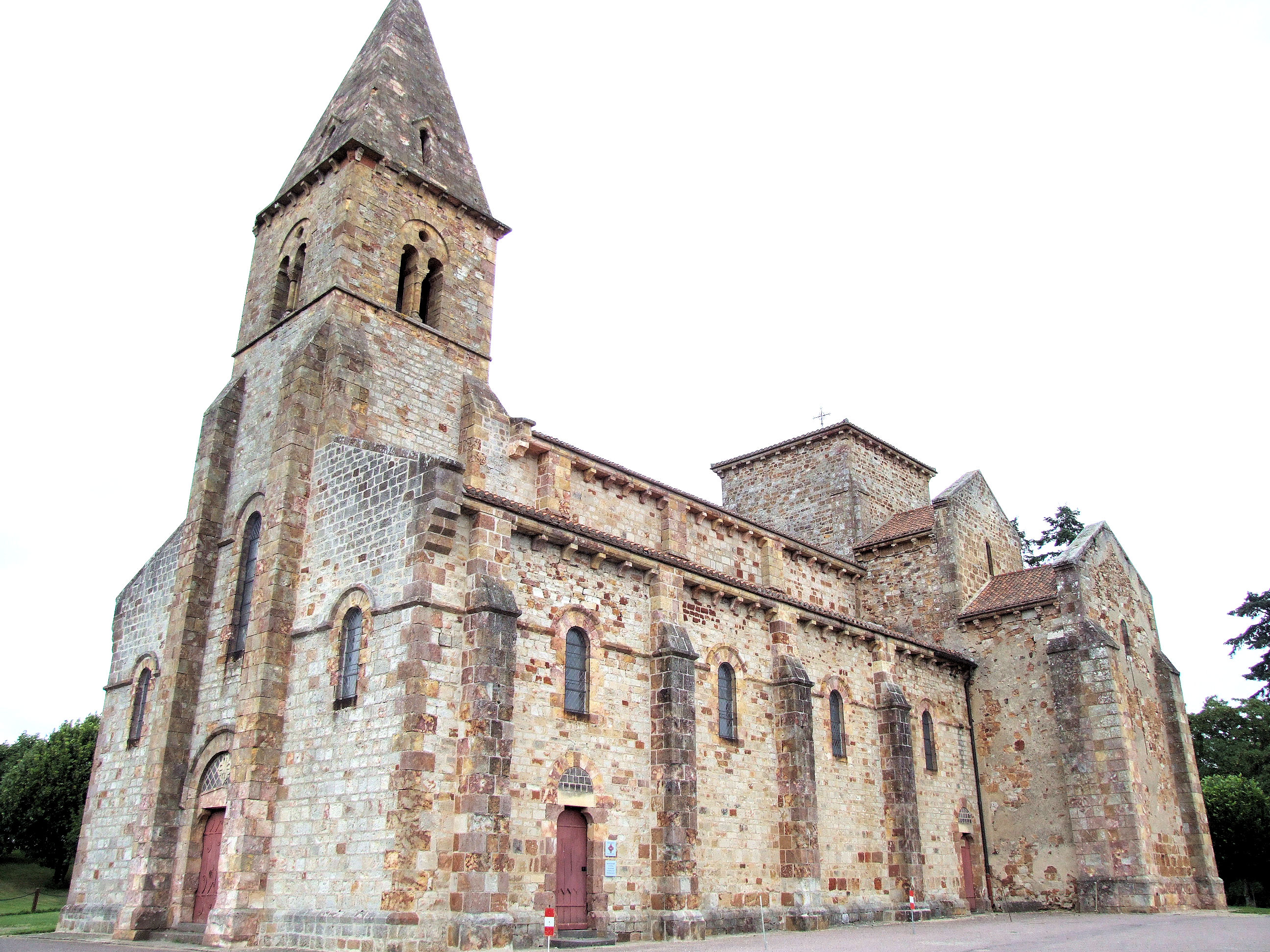
- The church in Saint-Désiré
- Location of Saint-Désiré
- Location within France Location within Auvergne-Rhône-Alpes
- Coordinates: 46°29′54″N 2°25′57″E
- Country: France
- Region: Auvergne-Rhône-Alpes
- Department: Allier
- Arrondissement: Montluçon
- Canton: Huriel
- Intercommunality: Pays d'Huriel

Government
  - Mayor (2026–32): Nadège Vermez
- Area^{1}: 41.89 km^{2} (16.17 sq mi)
- Elevation: 328 m (1,076 ft)
- Highest elevation: 400 m (1,300 ft)
- Lowest elevation: 193 m (633 ft)
- Population (2023): 424
  - Density: 10.1/km^{2} (26.2/sq mi)
- Time zone: UTC+01:00 (CET)
  - Summer (DST): UTC+02:00 (CEST)
- INSEE/Postal code: 03225 /03370
- ^{1} French Land Register data, which excludes lakes, ponds, glaciers > 1 km^{2} (0.386 sq mi or 247 acres) and river estuaries.

Saint-Désiré (French pronunciation: [sɛ̃ deziʁe]; Occitan: Sant Desirat) is a commune in the Allier department in Auvergne-Rhône-Alpes in central France.

== Population ==
Historical population
Year	Pop.	±% p.a.
1968	731	—
1975	555	−3.86%
1982	498	−1.54%
1990	442	−1.48%
1999	455	+0.32%
2007	468	+0.35%
2012	445	−1.00%
2017	447	+0.09%
2023	424	−0.88%
Source: INSEE

== See also ==
- Communes of the Allier department
