= Mesples =

- Commune
- Coat of arms
- Location of Mesples
- Location within France Location within Auvergne-Rhône-Alpes
- Coordinates: 46°26′02″N 2°21′34″E
- Country: France
- Region: Auvergne-Rhône-Alpes
- Department: Allier
- Arrondissement: Montluçon
- Canton: Huriel
- Intercommunality: Pays d'Huriel

Government
  - Mayor (2026–32): Philippe Pla
- Area^{1}: 15.3 km^{2} (5.9 sq mi)
- Elevation: 396 m (1,299 ft)
- Highest elevation: 441 m (1,447 ft)
- Lowest elevation: 307 m (1,007 ft)
- Population (2023): 129
  - Density: 8.43/km^{2} (21.8/sq mi)
- Time zone: UTC+01:00 (CET)
  - Summer (DST): UTC+02:00 (CEST)
- INSEE/Postal code: 03172 /03370
- ^{1} French Land Register data, which excludes lakes, ponds, glaciers > 1 km^{2} (0.386 sq mi or 247 acres) and river estuaries.

Mesples is a commune in the Allier department in central France.

== Population ==
Historical population
Year	Pop.	±% p.a.
1968	224	—
1975	171	−3.78%
1982	140	−2.82%
1990	149	+0.78%
1999	127	−1.76%
2007	132	+0.48%
2012	130	−0.30%
2017	124	−0.94%
2023	129	+0.66%
Source: INSEE

== See also ==
- Communes of the Allier department
