= Communes of the Allier department =

List of communes of the Allier department of France

Location of Allier department in France

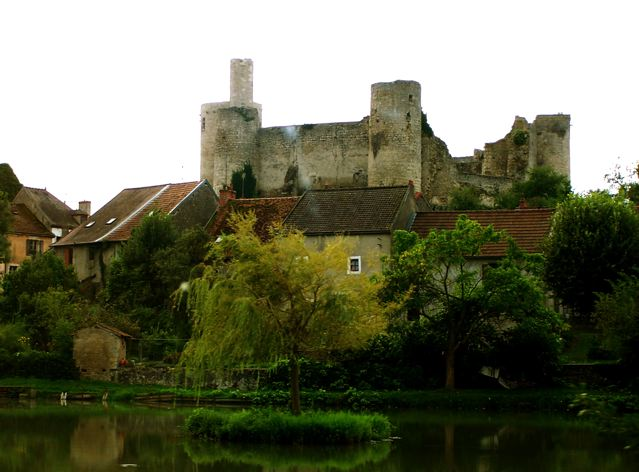
Castle of Billy

The following is a list of the 317 communes of the Allier department of France.

== Intercommunalities ==
The communes cooperate in the following intercommunalities (as of 2025):

- Communauté d'agglomération Montluçon Communauté (CAML)
- Communauté d'agglomération Moulins Communauté (CAMO, partly)
- Communauté d'agglomération Vichy Communauté (CAV)
- Communauté de communes du Bocage Bourbonnais
- Communauté de communes Commentry Montmarault Néris Communauté
- Communauté de communes Entr'Allier Besbre et Loire
- Communauté de communes Le Grand Charolais (partly)
- Communauté de communes du Pays d'Huriel
- Communauté de communes du Pays de Lapalisse
- Communauté de communes du Pays de Tronçais
- Communauté de communes Saint-Pourçain Sioule Limagne
- Communauté de communes du Val de Cher

== List of communes ==
List of the 317 communes:

INSEE	Postal	Commune
03001	03200	Abrest ^{(CAV)}
03002	03210	Agonges
03003	03360	Ainay-le-Château
03004	03120	Andelaroche
03005	03380	Archignat
03006	03640	Arfeuilles ^{(CAV)}
03007	03420	Arpheuilles-Saint-Priest ^{(CAML)}
03008	03250	Arronnes ^{(CAV)}
03009	03460	Aubigny ^{(CAMO)}
03010	03190	Audes
03011	03460	Aurouër ^{(CAMO)}
03012	03210	Autry-Issards
03013	03000	Avermes ^{(CAMO)}
03014	03130	Avrilly
03015	03460	Bagneux ^{(CAMO)}
03016	03140	Barberier
03017	03120	Barrais-Bussolles
03018	03500	Bayet
03019	03230	Beaulon
03020	03390	Beaune-d'Allier
03021	03800	Bègues
03022	03330	Bellenaves
03023	03700	Bellerive-sur-Allier ^{(CAV)}
03024	03130	Bert
03025	03340	Bessay-sur-Allier ^{(CAMO)}
03026	03210	Besson ^{(CAMO)}
03027	03170	Bézenet
03028	03120	Billezois
03029	03260	Billy ^{(CAV)}
03030	03800	Biozat
03031	03170	Bizeneuille
03032	03390	Blomard
03033	03300	Bost ^{(CAV)}
03034	03150	Boucé
03035	03130	Le Bouchaud
03036	03160	Bourbon-l'Archambault
03037	03360	Braize
03038	03500	Bransat
03039	03210	Bresnay ^{(CAMO)}
03040	03000	Bressolles ^{(CAMO)}
03041	03350	Le Brethon
03042	03120	Le Breuil
03043	03110	Broût-Vernet
03044	03700	Brugheas ^{(CAV)}
03045	03270	Busset ^{(CAV)}
03046	03440	Buxières-les-Mines
03047	03600	La Celle
03048	03350	Cérilly
03049	03500	Cesset
03050	03250	La Chabanne ^{(CAV)}
03051	03370	Chambérat
03052	03170	Chamblet
03053	03140	Chantelle
03054	03340	Chapeau ^{(CAMO)}
03055	03380	La Chapelaude
03056	03300	La Chapelle ^{(CAV)}
03057	03230	La Chapelle-aux-Chasses ^{(CAMO)}
03058	03390	Chappes
03059	03140	Chareil-Cintrat
03060	03110	Charmeil ^{(CAV)}
03061	03800	Charmes
03062	03140	Charroux
03063	03510	Chassenard
03064	03320	Château-sur-Allier ^{(CAMO)}
03065	03500	Châtel-de-Neuvre
03066	03250	Châtel-Montagne ^{(CAV)}
03067	03220	Châtelperron
03068	03640	Châtelus ^{(CAV)}
03069	03210	Châtillon
03070	03440	Chavenon
03071	03220	Chavroches
03072	03370	Chazemais
03073	03210	Chemilly ^{(CAMO)}
03074	03230	Chevagnes ^{(CAMO)}
03075	03140	Chezelle
03076	03230	Chézy ^{(CAMO)}
03077	03330	Chirat-l'Église
03078	03450	Chouvigny
03079	03220	Cindré
03080	03110	Cognat-Lyonne ^{(CAV)}
03081	03600	Colombier
03082	03600	Commentry
03083	03500	Contigny
03084	03430	Cosne-d'Allier
03085	03000	Coulandon ^{(CAMO)}
03086	03470	Coulanges
03087	03320	Couleuvre
03088	03370	Courçais
03089	03330	Coutansouze
03090	03160	Couzon ^{(CAMO)}
03091	03150	Créchy
03092	03240	Cressanges
03093	03300	Creuzier-le-Neuf ^{(CAV)}
03094	03300	Creuzier-le-Vieux ^{(CAV)}
03095	03300	Cusset ^{(CAV)}
03096	03140	Deneuille-lès-Chantelle
03097	03170	Deneuille-les-Mines
03098	03630	Désertines ^{(CAML)}
03099	03240	Deux-Chaises
03100	03290	Diou
03101	03410	Domérat ^{(CAML)}
03102	03290	Dompierre-sur-Besbre
03103	03130	Le Donjon
03104	03170	Doyet
03105	03120	Droiturier
03106	03310	Durdat-Larequille
03107	03450	Ébreuil
03108	03330	Échassières
03109	03110	Escurolles
03110	03110	Espinasse-Vozelle ^{(CAV)}
03111	03190	Estivareilles
03112	03140	Étroussat
03113	03250	Ferrières-sur-Sichon ^{(CAV)}
03114	03340	La Ferté-Hauterive
03115	03140	Fleuriel
03116	03140	Fourilles
03117	03160	Franchesse
03118	03800	Gannat
03119	03230	Gannay-sur-Loire ^{(CAMO)}
03120	03230	Garnat-sur-Engièvre ^{(CAMO)}
03121	03400	Gennetines ^{(CAMO)}
03122	03210	Gipcy
03124	03340	Gouise ^{(CAMO)}
03125	03250	La Guillermie ^{(CAV)}
03158	03190	Haut-Bocage
03126	03270	Hauterive ^{(CAV)}
03127	03190	Hérisson
03128	03380	Huriel
03129	03600	Hyds
03130	03360	Isle-et-Bardais
03131	03120	Isserpent
03132	03220	Jaligny-sur-Besbre
03133	03800	Jenzat
03134	03500	Laféline
03135	03450	Lalizolle
03136	03380	Lamaids ^{(CAML)}
03137	03150	Langy
03138	03120	Lapalisse
03139	03250	Laprugne ^{(CAV)}
03140	03310	Lavault-Sainte-Anne ^{(CAML)}
03141	03250	Lavoine ^{(CAV)}
03142	03130	Lenax
03143	03360	Lételon
03144	03130	Liernolles
03145	03410	Lignerolles ^{(CAML)}
03146	03320	Limoise ^{(CAMO)}
03147	03130	Loddes
03148	03500	Loriges
03149	03500	Louchy-Montfand
03150	03350	Louroux-Bourbonnais
03151	03600	Louroux-de-Beaune
03152	03330	Louroux-de-Bouble
03154	03130	Luneau
03155	03320	Lurcy-Lévis ^{(CAMO)}
03156	03230	Lusigny ^{(CAMO)}
03157	03260	Magnet ^{(CAV)}
03159	03600	Malicorne
03160	03260	Marcenat

INSEE	Postal	Commune
03161	03420	Marcillat-en-Combraille ^{(CAML)}
03162	03210	Marigny ^{(CAMO)}
03163	03270	Mariol ^{(CAV)}
03164	03800	Le Mayet-d'École
03165	03250	Le Mayet-de-Montagne ^{(CAV)}
03166	03800	Mazerier
03167	03420	Mazirat ^{(CAML)}
03168	03360	Meaulne-Vitray
03169	03500	Meillard
03170	03210	Meillers
03171	03340	Mercy
03172	03370	Mesples
03173	03510	Molinet
03174	03300	Molles ^{(CAV)}
03175	03140	Monestier
03176	03500	Monétay-sur-Allier
03177	03470	Monétay-sur-Loire
03178	03130	Montaiguët-en-Forez
03179	03150	Montaigu-le-Blin
03180	03340	Montbeugny ^{(CAMO)}
03181	03130	Montcombroux-les-Mines
03182	03800	Monteignet-sur-l'Andelot
03183	03240	Le Montet
03184	03000	Montilly ^{(CAMO)}
03185	03100	Montluçon ^{(CAML)}
03186	03390	Montmarault
03187	03150	Montoldre
03188	03500	Montord
03189	03170	Montvicq
03190	03000	Moulins ^{(CAMO)}
03191	03390	Murat
03192	03450	Nades
03193	03190	Nassigny
03194	03330	Naves
03195	03310	Néris-les-Bains
03196	03130	Neuilly-en-Donjon
03197	03340	Neuilly-le-Réal ^{(CAMO)}
03198	03320	Neure ^{(CAMO)}
03200	03000	Neuvy ^{(CAMO)}
03201	03250	Nizerolles ^{(CAV)}
03202	03210	Noyant-d'Allier
03203	03230	Paray-le-Frésil ^{(CAMO)}
03204	03500	Paray-sous-Briailles
03205	03120	Périgny
03206	03420	La Petite-Marche ^{(CAML)}
03207	03470	Pierrefitte-sur-Loire
03208	03130	Le Pin
03209	03800	Poëzat
03210	03320	Pouzy-Mésangy ^{(CAMO)}
03211	03410	Prémilhat ^{(CAML)}
03212	03380	Quinssaines ^{(CAML)}
03213	03190	Reugny
03214	03240	Rocles
03215	03150	Rongères
03216	03420	Ronnet ^{(CAML)}
03217	03170	Saint-Angel
03218	03160	Saint-Aubin-le-Monial
03219	03390	Saint-Bonnet-de-Four
03220	03800	Saint-Bonnet-de-Rochefort
03221	03360	Saint-Bonnet-Tronçais
03222	03190	Saint-Caprais
03223	03120	Saint-Christophe-en-Bourbonnais
03224	03250	Saint-Clément ^{(CAV)}
03225	03370	Saint-Désiré
03226	03130	Saint-Didier-en-Donjon
03227	03110	Saint-Didier-la-Forêt
03228	03370	Saint-Éloy-d'Allier
03229	03400	Saint-Ennemond ^{(CAMO)}
03261	03420	Sainte-Thérence ^{(CAML)}
03230	03300	Saint-Étienne-de-Vicq
03231	03420	Saint-Fargeol ^{(CAML)}
03232	03260	Saint-Félix
03233	03310	Saint-Genest ^{(CAML)}
03234	03340	Saint-Gérand-de-Vaux
03235	03150	Saint-Gérand-le-Puy
03237	03140	Saint-Germain-de-Salles
03236	03260	Saint-Germain-des-Fossés ^{(CAV)}
03238	03440	Saint-Hilaire
03239	03130	Saint-Léger-sur-Vouzance
03240	03220	Saint-Léon
03241	03160	Saint-Léopardin-d'Augy ^{(CAMO)}
03242	03150	Saint-Loup
03244	03420	Saint-Marcel-en-Marcillat ^{(CAML)}
03243	03390	Saint-Marcel-en-Murat
03245	03230	Saint-Martin-des-Lais ^{(CAMO)}
03246	03380	Saint-Martinien
03247	03210	Saint-Menoux
03248	03250	Saint-Nicolas-des-Biefs ^{(CAV)}
03249	03370	Saint-Palais
03250	42620	Saint-Pierre-Laval
03251	03160	Saint-Plaisir
03252	03110	Saint-Pont ^{(CAV)}
03253	03290	Saint-Pourçain-sur-Besbre
03254	03500	Saint-Pourçain-sur-Sioule
03255	03800	Saint-Priest-d'Andelot
03256	03390	Saint-Priest-en-Murat
03257	03120	Saint-Prix
03258	03110	Saint-Rémy-en-Rollat ^{(CAV)}
03259	03370	Saint-Sauvier
03260	03240	Saint-Sornin
03262	03410	Saint-Victor ^{(CAML)}
03263	03220	Saint-Voir
03264	03270	Saint-Yorre ^{(CAV)}
03265	03470	Saligny-sur-Roudon
03266	03150	Sanssat
03267	03500	Saulcet
03268	03800	Saulzet
03269	03430	Sauvagny
03270	03390	Sazeret
03271	03700	Serbannes ^{(CAV)}
03272	03120	Servilly
03273	03260	Seuillet ^{(CAV)}
03274	03220	Sorbier
03275	03210	Souvigny ^{(CAMO)}
03276	03450	Sussat
03277	03140	Target
03278	03140	Taxat-Senat
03279	03410	Teillet-Argenty ^{(CAML)}
03280	03420	Terjat ^{(CAML)}
03281	03240	Le Theil
03282	03350	Theneuille
03283	03230	Thiel-sur-Acolin ^{(CAMO)}
03284	03220	Thionne
03285	03430	Tortezais
03286	03400	Toulon-sur-Allier ^{(CAMO)}
03287	03240	Treban
03288	03380	Treignat
03289	03220	Treteau
03290	03460	Trévol ^{(CAMO)}
03291	03220	Trézelles
03292	03240	Tronget
03293	03360	Urçay
03294	03140	Ussel-d'Allier
03295	03330	Valignat
03296	03360	Valigny
03297	03190	Vallon-en-Sully
03298	03150	Varennes-sur-Allier
03299	03220	Varennes-sur-Tèche
03300	03220	Vaumas
03301	03190	Vaux
03302	03450	Veauce
03303	03190	Venas
03304	03110	Vendat ^{(CAV)}
03305	03190	Verneix
03306	03200	Le Vernet ^{(CAV)}
03307	03500	Verneuil-en-Bourbonnais
03308	03390	Vernusse
03309	03320	Le Veurdre ^{(CAMO)}
03310	03200	Vichy ^{(CAV)}
03311	03450	Vicq
03312	03430	Vieure
03313	03350	Le Vilhain
03314	03310	Villebret ^{(CAML)}
03315	03430	Villefranche-d'Allier
03316	03460	Villeneuve-sur-Allier ^{(CAMO)}
03317	03370	Viplaix
03319	03140	Voussac
03320	03160	Ygrande
03321	03400	Yzeure ^{(CAMO)}

=== Former communes ===
Former communes in Allier (communes nouvelles):

- Givarlais, Louroux-Hodement, Maillet merged into Haut-Bocage on 1 January 2016;
- Meaulne, Vitray merged into Meaulne-Vitray on 1 January 2017.
