= Saint-Éloy-d'Allier =

- Commune
- Location of Saint-Éloy-d'Allier
- Location within France Location within Auvergne-Rhône-Alpes
- Coordinates: 46°29′17″N 2°21′39″E
- Country: France
- Region: Auvergne-Rhône-Alpes
- Department: Allier
- Arrondissement: Montluçon
- Canton: Huriel
- Intercommunality: Pays d'Huriel

Government
  - Mayor (2026–32): Bertrand Dumontet
- Area^{1}: 12.83 km^{2} (4.95 sq mi)
- Elevation: 390 m (1,280 ft)
- Highest elevation: 400 m (1,300 ft)
- Lowest elevation: 257 m (843 ft)
- Population (2023): 58
  - Density: 4.5/km^{2} (12/sq mi)
- Time zone: UTC+01:00 (CET)
  - Summer (DST): UTC+02:00 (CEST)
- INSEE/Postal code: 03228 /03370
- ^{1} French Land Register data, which excludes lakes, ponds, glaciers > 1 km^{2} (0.386 sq mi or 247 acres) and river estuaries.

Saint-Éloy-d'Allier (French pronunciation: [sɛ̃.t‿elwa dalje]) is a commune in the Allier department in Auvergne-Rhône-Alpes in central France.

== Population ==
Historical population
Year	Pop.	±% p.a.
1968	119	—
1975	92	−3.61%
1982	88	−0.63%
1990	63	−4.09%
1999	69	+1.02%
2007	60	−1.73%
2012	52	−2.82%
2017	43	−3.73%
2023	58	+5.11%
Source: INSEE

== See also ==
- Communes of the Allier department
