= Chazemais =

- Commune
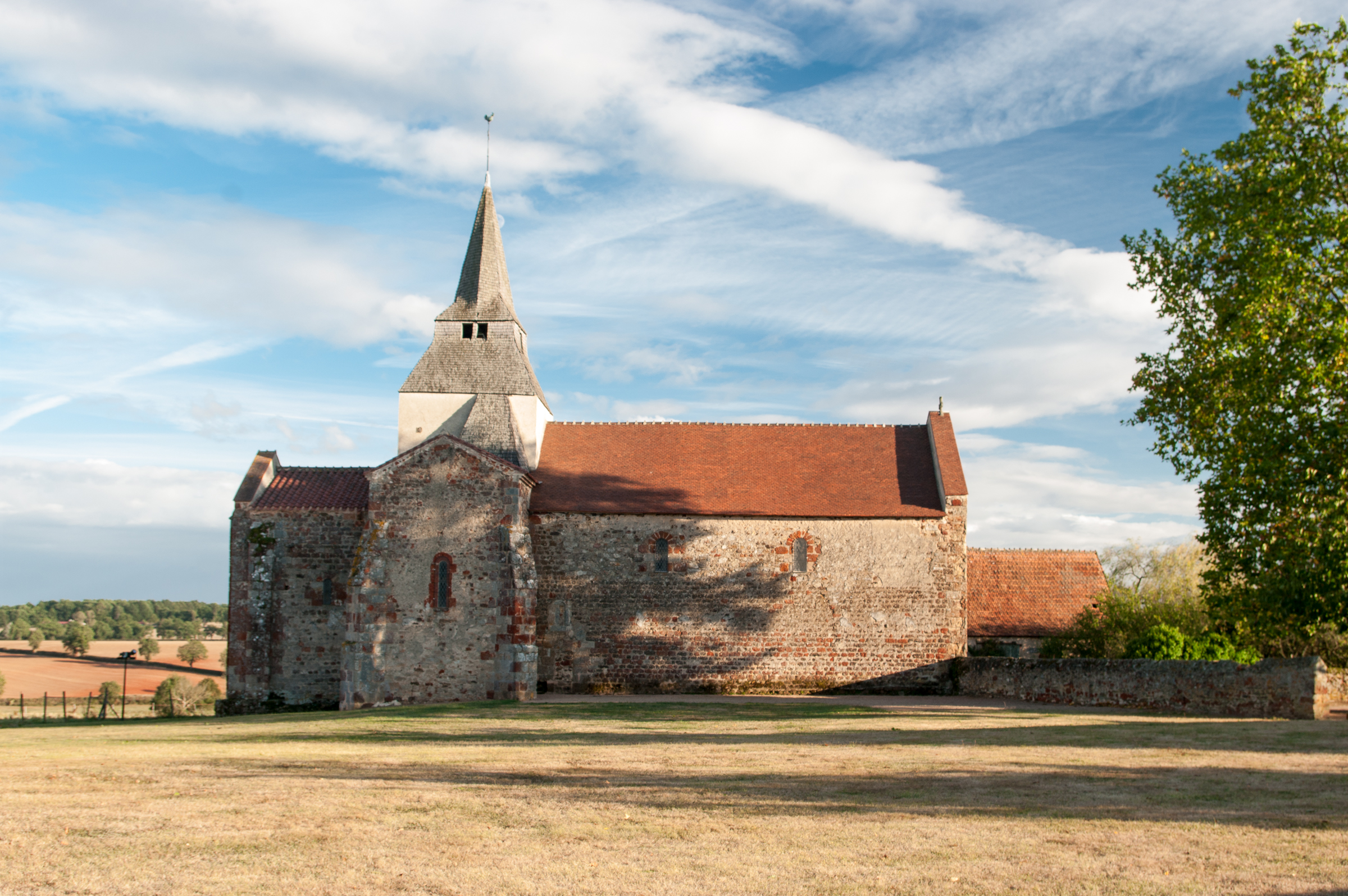
- The church in Chazemais
- Location of Chazemais
- Location within France Location within Auvergne-Rhône-Alpes
- Coordinates: 46°29′01″N 2°31′35″E
- Country: France
- Region: Auvergne-Rhône-Alpes
- Department: Allier
- Arrondissement: Montluçon
- Canton: Huriel
- Intercommunality: Pays d'Huriel

Government
  - Mayor (2026–32): Christophe Leclerc
- Area^{1}: 29.1 km^{2} (11.2 sq mi)
- Elevation: 300 m (980 ft)
- Highest elevation: 330 m (1,080 ft)
- Lowest elevation: 210 m (690 ft)
- Population (2023): 504
  - Density: 17.3/km^{2} (44.9/sq mi)
- Time zone: UTC+01:00 (CET)
  - Summer (DST): UTC+02:00 (CEST)
- INSEE/Postal code: 03072 /03370
- ^{1} French Land Register data, which excludes lakes, ponds, glaciers > 1 km^{2} (0.386 sq mi or 247 acres) and river estuaries.

Chazemais (French pronunciation: [ʃazmɛ]) is a commune in the Allier department in central France.

== Population ==
Historical population
Year	Pop.	±% p.a.
1968	494	—
1975	414	−2.49%
1982	399	−0.53%
1990	401	+0.06%
1999	387	−0.39%
2007	444	+1.73%
2012	512	+2.89%
2017	495	−0.67%
2023	504	+0.30%
Source: INSEE

== See also ==
- Communes of the Allier department
