= Audes =

- Commune
- Location of Audes
- Location within France Location within Auvergne-Rhône-Alpes
- Coordinates: 46°27′31″N 2°33′32″E
- Country: France
- Region: Auvergne-Rhône-Alpes
- Department: Allier
- Arrondissement: Montluçon
- Canton: Huriel
- Intercommunality: Val de Cher

Government
  - Mayor (2026–32): Marie-Dominique Marsaud
- Area^{1}: 28.26 km^{2} (10.91 sq mi)
- Elevation: 222 m (728 ft)
- Highest elevation: 299 m (981 ft)
- Lowest elevation: 177 m (581 ft)
- Population (2023): 402
  - Density: 14.2/km^{2} (36.8/sq mi)
- Time zone: UTC+01:00 (CET)
  - Summer (DST): UTC+02:00 (CEST)
- INSEE/Postal code: 03010 /03190
- ^{1} French Land Register data, which excludes lakes, ponds, glaciers > 1 km^{2} (0.386 sq mi or 247 acres) and river estuaries.

Audes (French pronunciation: [od]; Occitan, Auda) is a commune in the Allier department in central France.

== Population ==
Historical population
Year	Pop.	±% p.a.
1968	476	—
1975	409	−2.14%
1982	470	+2.01%
1990	461	−0.24%
1999	451	−0.24%
2007	457	+0.17%
2012	443	−0.62%
2017	433	−0.46%
2023	402	−1.23%
Source: INSEE

The inhabitants of the town of Audes are called Audois in French.

== Politics ==
Mayors of the commune of Audes:

- 2008–2020: Serge Boulade
- 2020–2024: Michel Cheymol
- 2024–2026: Adrien Job
- 2026–current: Marie-Dominique Marsaud

== See also ==
- Communes of the Allier department
