= Canton of Montluçon-Nord-Est =

Coordinates: 46°20′27″N 2°36′12″E

Montluçon-Nord-Est
- Former canton
- Interactive map of Montluçon-Nord-Est
- Country: France
- Region: Auvergne-Rhône-Alpes
- Department: Allier
- No. of communes: {{{nbcomm}}}
- Disbanded: 2015
- Population (2012): 11,228

The canton of Montluçon-Nord-Est is a former administrative division in central France. It was disbanded following the French canton reorganisation which came into effect in March 2015. It had 11,228 inhabitants (2012).

The canton comprised the following communes:

- Montluçon (partly)
- Saint-Victor
- Vaux

== Demographics ==
Historical population
Year	Pop.	±%
1990	11,860	—
1999	11,255	−5.1%
2012	11,228	−0.2%

== See also ==
- Cantons of the Allier department
