= Saint-Martinien =

- Commune
- Location of Saint-Martinien
- Location within France Location within Auvergne-Rhône-Alpes
- Coordinates: 46°20′12″N 2°28′18″E
- Country: France
- Region: Auvergne-Rhône-Alpes
- Department: Allier
- Arrondissement: Montluçon
- Canton: Huriel
- Intercommunality: Pays d'Huriel

Government
  - Mayor (2026–32): Nadine Emery-Provost
- Area^{1}: 25.48 km^{2} (9.84 sq mi)
- Elevation: 414 m (1,358 ft)
- Highest elevation: 557 m (1,827 ft)
- Lowest elevation: 344 m (1,129 ft)
- Population (2023): 597
  - Density: 23.4/km^{2} (60.7/sq mi)
- Time zone: UTC+01:00 (CET)
  - Summer (DST): UTC+02:00 (CEST)
- INSEE/Postal code: 03246 /03380
- ^{1} French Land Register data, which excludes lakes, ponds, glaciers > 1 km^{2} (0.386 sq mi or 247 acres) and river estuaries.

Saint-Martinien (French pronunciation: [sɛ̃ maʁtinjɛ̃]) is a commune in the Allier department in Auvergne-Rhône-Alpes in central France.

== Population ==
Historical population
Year	Pop.	±% p.a.
1968	525	—
1975	441	−2.46%
1982	474	+1.04%
1990	533	+1.48%
1999	518	−0.32%
2007	605	+1.96%
2012	627	+0.72%
2017	602	−0.81%
2023	597	−0.14%
Source: INSEE

== See also ==
- Communes of the Allier department
