= Treignat =

- Commune
- Coat of arms
- Location of Treignat
- Location within France Location within Auvergne-Rhône-Alpes
- Coordinates: 46°20′58″N 2°20′29″E
- Country: France
- Region: Auvergne-Rhône-Alpes
- Department: Allier
- Arrondissement: Montluçon
- Canton: Huriel
- Intercommunality: Pays d'Huriel

Government
  - Mayor (2026–32): Philippe Rondeaux
- Area^{1}: 28.94 km^{2} (11.17 sq mi)
- Elevation: 433 m (1,421 ft)
- Highest elevation: 556 m (1,824 ft)
- Lowest elevation: 374 m (1,227 ft)
- Population (2023): 434
  - Density: 15.0/km^{2} (38.8/sq mi)
- Time zone: UTC+01:00 (CET)
  - Summer (DST): UTC+02:00 (CEST)
- INSEE/Postal code: 03288 /03380
- ^{1} French Land Register data, which excludes lakes, ponds, glaciers > 1 km^{2} (0.386 sq mi or 247 acres) and river estuaries.

Treignat (French pronunciation: [tʁɛɲa]) is a commune in the Allier department in Auvergne-Rhône-Alpes in central France.

== Geography ==
The Petite Creuse river has its source in the commune.

== Population ==
Historical population
Year	Pop.	±% p.a.
1968	738	—
1975	677	−1.22%
1982	575	−2.31%
1990	531	−0.99%
1999	475	−1.23%
2007	452	−0.62%
2012	448	−0.18%
2017	396	−2.44%
2023	434	+1.54%
Source: INSEE

== See also ==
- Communes of the Allier department
