= Louroux-Bourbonnais =

- Commune
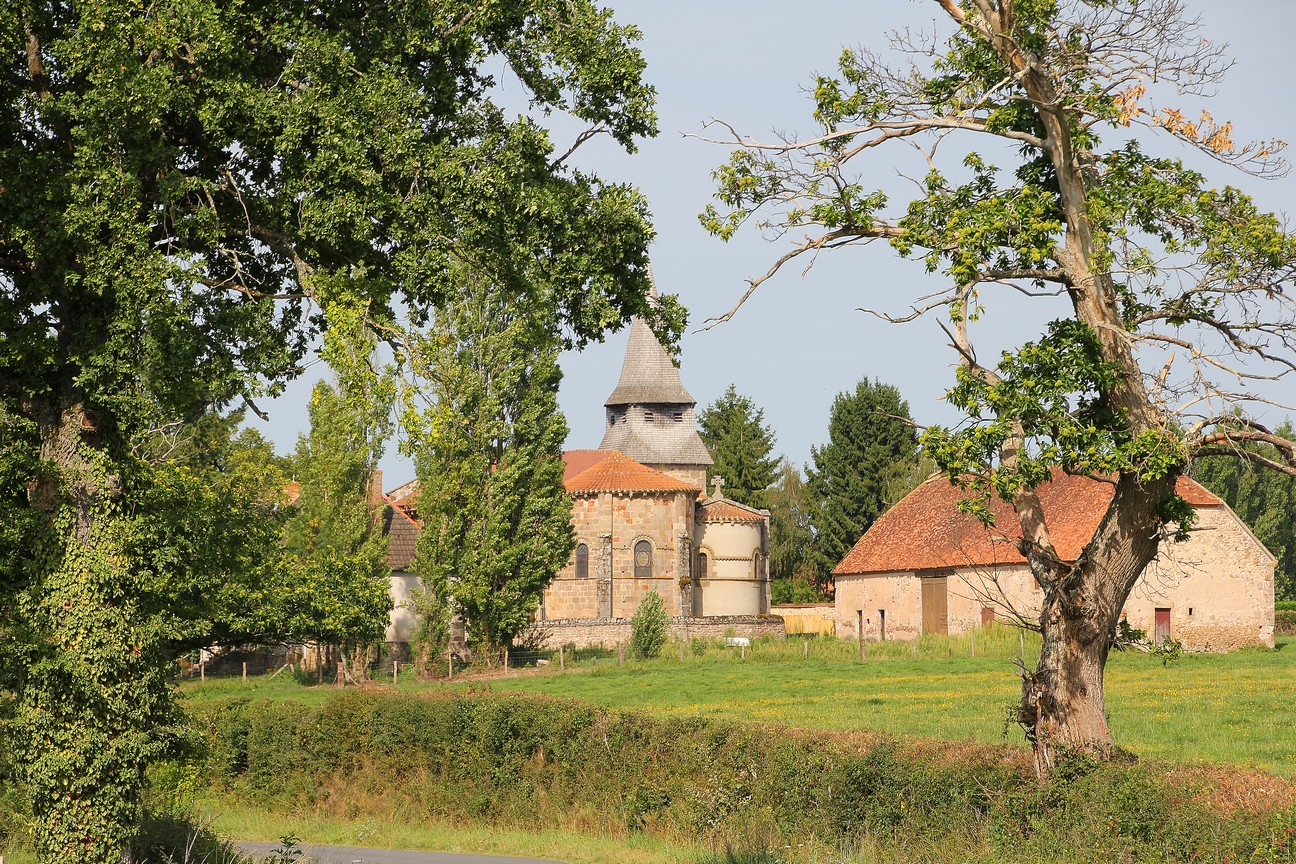
- The church in Louroux-Bourbonnais
- Location of Louroux-Bourbonnais
- Location within France Location within Auvergne-Rhône-Alpes
- Coordinates: 46°32′10″N 2°50′31″E
- Country: France
- Region: Auvergne-Rhône-Alpes
- Department: Allier
- Arrondissement: Moulins
- Canton: Huriel
- Intercommunality: Bocage Bourbonnais

Government
  - Mayor (2026–32): Jany Poirier
- Area^{1}: 33.02 km^{2} (12.75 sq mi)
- Elevation: 306 m (1,004 ft)
- Highest elevation: 397 m (1,302 ft)
- Lowest elevation: 243 m (797 ft)
- Population (2023): 205
  - Density: 6.21/km^{2} (16.1/sq mi)
- Time zone: UTC+01:00 (CET)
  - Summer (DST): UTC+02:00 (CEST)
- INSEE/Postal code: 03150 /03350
- ^{1} French Land Register data, which excludes lakes, ponds, glaciers > 1 km^{2} (0.386 sq mi or 247 acres) and river estuaries.

Louroux-Bourbonnais (French pronunciation: [luʁu buʁbɔnɛ]) is a commune in the Allier department in central France.

== Population ==
Historical population
Year	Pop.	±% p.a.
1968	447	—
1975	336	−4.00%
1982	287	−2.23%
1990	256	−1.42%
1999	245	−0.49%
2007	227	−0.95%
2012	247	+1.70%
2017	211	−3.10%
2023	205	−0.48%
Source: INSEE

== See also ==
- Communes of the Allier department
