= Tortezais =

- Commune
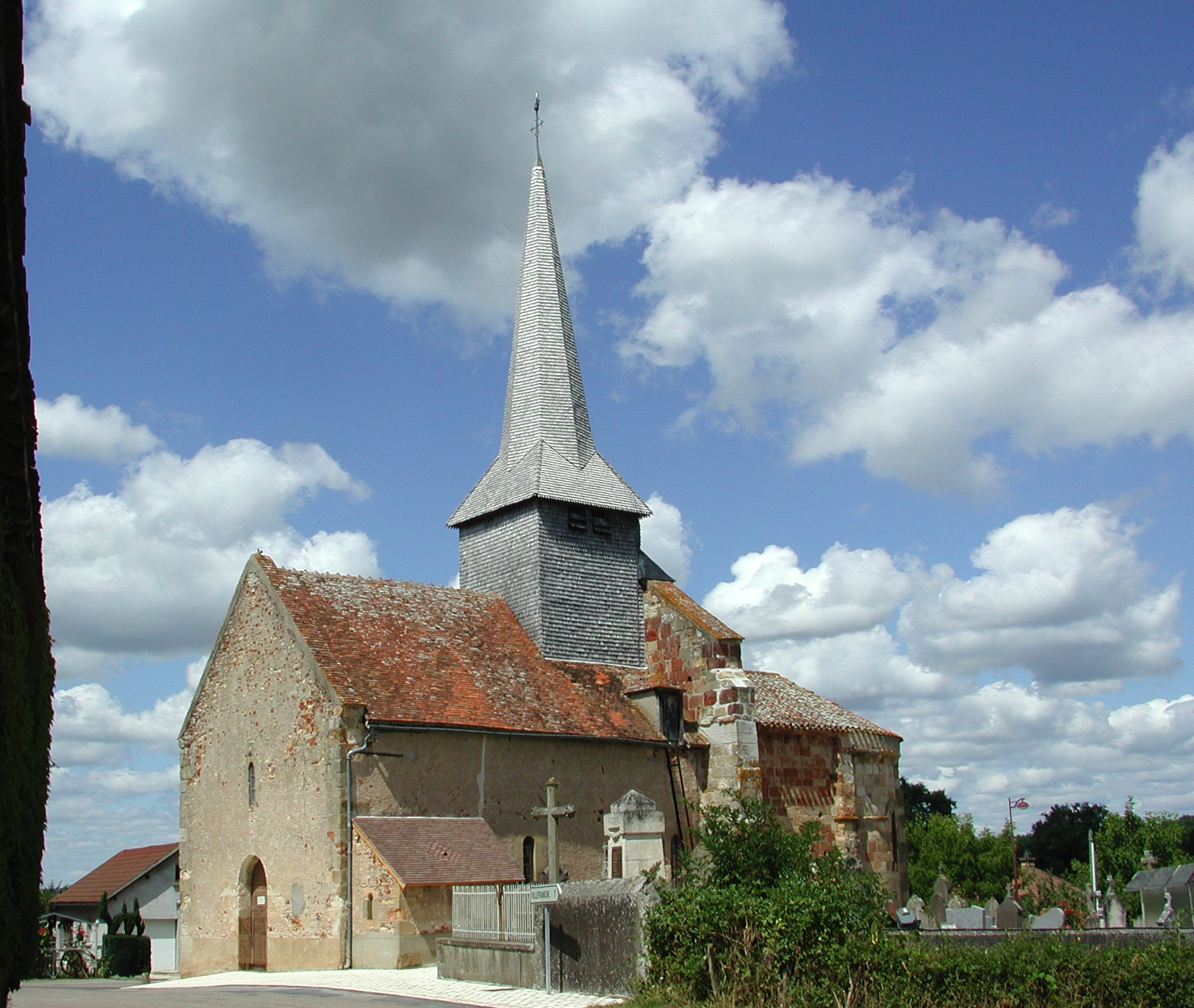
- The church in Tortezais
- Location of Tortezais
- Location within France Location within Auvergne-Rhône-Alpes
- Coordinates: 46°27′10″N 2°51′31″E
- Country: France
- Region: Auvergne-Rhône-Alpes
- Department: Allier
- Arrondissement: Montluçon
- Canton: Huriel
- Intercommunality: Commentry Montmarault Néris Communauté

Government
  - Mayor (2026–32): Olivier Gilbert
- Area^{1}: 24.11 km^{2} (9.31 sq mi)
- Elevation: 280 m (920 ft)
- Highest elevation: 307 m (1,007 ft)
- Lowest elevation: 230 m (750 ft)
- Population (2023): 172
  - Density: 7.13/km^{2} (18.5/sq mi)
- Time zone: UTC+01:00 (CET)
  - Summer (DST): UTC+02:00 (CEST)
- INSEE/Postal code: 03285 /03430
- ^{1} French Land Register data, which excludes lakes, ponds, glaciers > 1 km^{2} (0.386 sq mi or 247 acres) and river estuaries.

Tortezais (French pronunciation: [tɔʁtəzɛ]) is a commune in the Allier department in Auvergne-Rhône-Alpes in central France.

== Climate ==
On average, Tortezais experiences 66.5 days per year with a minimum temperature below 0 °C (32.0 °F), 1.5 days per year with a minimum temperature below −10 °C (14.0 °F), 4.7 days per year with a maximum temperature below 0 °C (32.0 °F), and 22.3 days per year with a maximum temperature above 30 °C (86.0 °F). The record high temperature was 41.9 °C (107.4 °F) on June 21, 2026, while the record low temperature was −15.6 °C (3.9 °F) on December 26, 2010.

Climate data for Tortezais (1991–2020 normals, extremes 1991–present)
Month	Jan	Feb	Mar	Apr	May	Jun	Jul	Aug	Sep	Oct	Nov	Dec	Year
Record high °C (°F)	21.7 (71.1)	24.2 (75.6)	25.5 (77.9)	29.1 (84.4)	34.7 (94.5)	41.9 (107.4)	41.6 (106.9)	41.1 (106.0)	36.7 (98.1)	33.8 (92.8)	27.7 (81.9)	20.1 (68.2)	41.9 (107.4)
Mean daily maximum °C (°F)	7.8 (46.0)	9.2 (48.6)	13.2 (55.8)	16.3 (61.3)	20.1 (68.2)	24.1 (75.4)	26.7 (80.1)	26.8 (80.2)	22.4 (72.3)	17.5 (63.5)	11.9 (53.4)	8.5 (47.3)	17.0 (62.7)
Daily mean °C (°F)	4.2 (39.6)	4.8 (40.6)	7.6 (45.7)	10.3 (50.5)	14.1 (57.4)	17.8 (64.0)	20.0 (68.0)	19.9 (67.8)	15.9 (60.6)	12.4 (54.3)	7.6 (45.7)	4.8 (40.6)	11.6 (52.9)
Mean daily minimum °C (°F)	0.6 (33.1)	0.3 (32.5)	2.1 (35.8)	4.3 (39.7)	8.1 (46.6)	11.6 (52.9)	13.3 (55.9)	13.0 (55.4)	9.4 (48.9)	7.2 (45.0)	3.4 (38.1)	1.1 (34.0)	6.2 (43.2)
Record low °C (°F)	−15.5 (4.1)	−14.7 (5.5)	−13.1 (8.4)	−6.3 (20.7)	−2.2 (28.0)	2.2 (36.0)	4.6 (40.3)	1.8 (35.2)	−0.9 (30.4)	−9.8 (14.4)	−10.9 (12.4)	−15.6 (3.9)	−15.6 (3.9)
Average precipitation mm (inches)	55.4 (2.18)	44.1 (1.74)	50.4 (1.98)	66.9 (2.63)	78.1 (3.07)	66.3 (2.61)	62.7 (2.47)	66.4 (2.61)	69.2 (2.72)	67.4 (2.65)	72.7 (2.86)	57.6 (2.27)	757.2 (29.79)
Average precipitation days (≥ 1.0 mm)	11.1	9.5	9.4	10.2	11.0	8.9	7.6	8.2	8.6	10.6	11.8	11.4	118.3
Source: Meteociel

== Population ==
Historical population
Year	Pop.	±% p.a.
1968	240	—
1975	191	−3.21%
1982	202	+0.80%
1990	149	−3.73%
1999	147	−0.15%
2007	171	+1.91%
2012	180	+1.03%
2017	175	−0.56%
2023	172	−0.29%
Source: INSEE

== See also ==
- Communes of the Allier department
