= Sauvagny =

- Commune
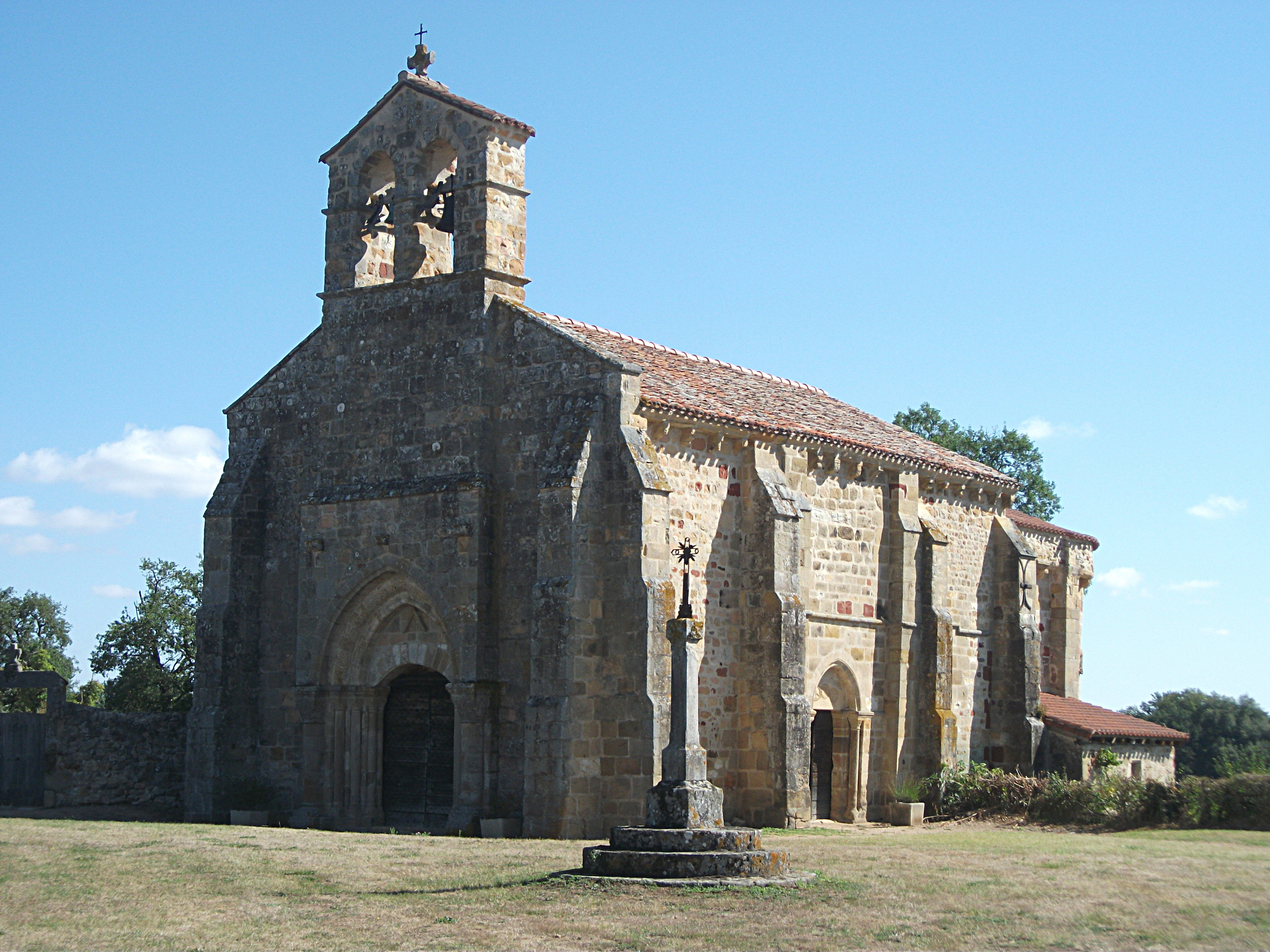
- Saint-Germain church
- Location of Sauvagny
- Location within France Location within Auvergne-Rhône-Alpes
- Coordinates: 46°26′44″N 2°49′15″E
- Country: France
- Region: Auvergne-Rhône-Alpes
- Department: Allier
- Arrondissement: Montluçon
- Canton: Huriel
- Intercommunality: Commentry Montmarault Néris Communauté

Government
  - Mayor (2026–32): Sabrina Andriot
- Area^{1}: 19.41 km^{2} (7.49 sq mi)
- Elevation: 233 m (764 ft)
- Highest elevation: 275 m (902 ft)
- Lowest elevation: 227 m (745 ft)
- Population (2023): 82
  - Density: 4.2/km^{2} (11/sq mi)
- Time zone: UTC+01:00 (CET)
  - Summer (DST): UTC+02:00 (CEST)
- INSEE/Postal code: 03269 /03430
- ^{1} French Land Register data, which excludes lakes, ponds, glaciers > 1 km^{2} (0.386 sq mi or 247 acres) and river estuaries.

Sauvagny (French pronunciation: [sovaɲi]) is a commune in the Allier department in Auvergne-Rhône-Alpes in central France.

== Population ==
Historical population
Year	Pop.	±% p.a.
1968	179	—
1975	159	−1.68%
1982	155	−0.36%
1990	123	−2.85%
1999	99	−2.38%
2007	94	−0.65%
2012	95	+0.21%
2017	89	−1.30%
2023	82	−1.36%
Source: INSEE

== See also ==
- Communes of the Allier department
