= Canton of Domérat-Montluçon-Nord-Ouest =

Coordinates: 46°21′40″N 2°32′07″E

Domérat-Montluçon-Nord-Ouest
- Former canton
- Interactive map of Domérat-Montluçon-Nord-Ouest
- Country: France
- Region: Auvergne-Rhône-Alpes
- Department: Allier
- No. of communes: {{{nbcomm}}}
- Disbanded: 2015
- Population (2012): 11,703

The canton of Domérat-Montluçon-Nord-Ouest is a former administrative division in central France. It was disbanded following the French canton reorganisation which came into effect in March 2015. It had 11,703 inhabitants (2012).

The canton comprised the following communes:

- Domérat
- Montluçon (partly)

== Demographics ==
Historical population
Year	Pop.	±%
1990	13,011	—
1999	12,041	−7.5%
2012	11,703	−2.8%

== See also ==
- Cantons of the Allier department
