= Bizeneuille =

- Commune
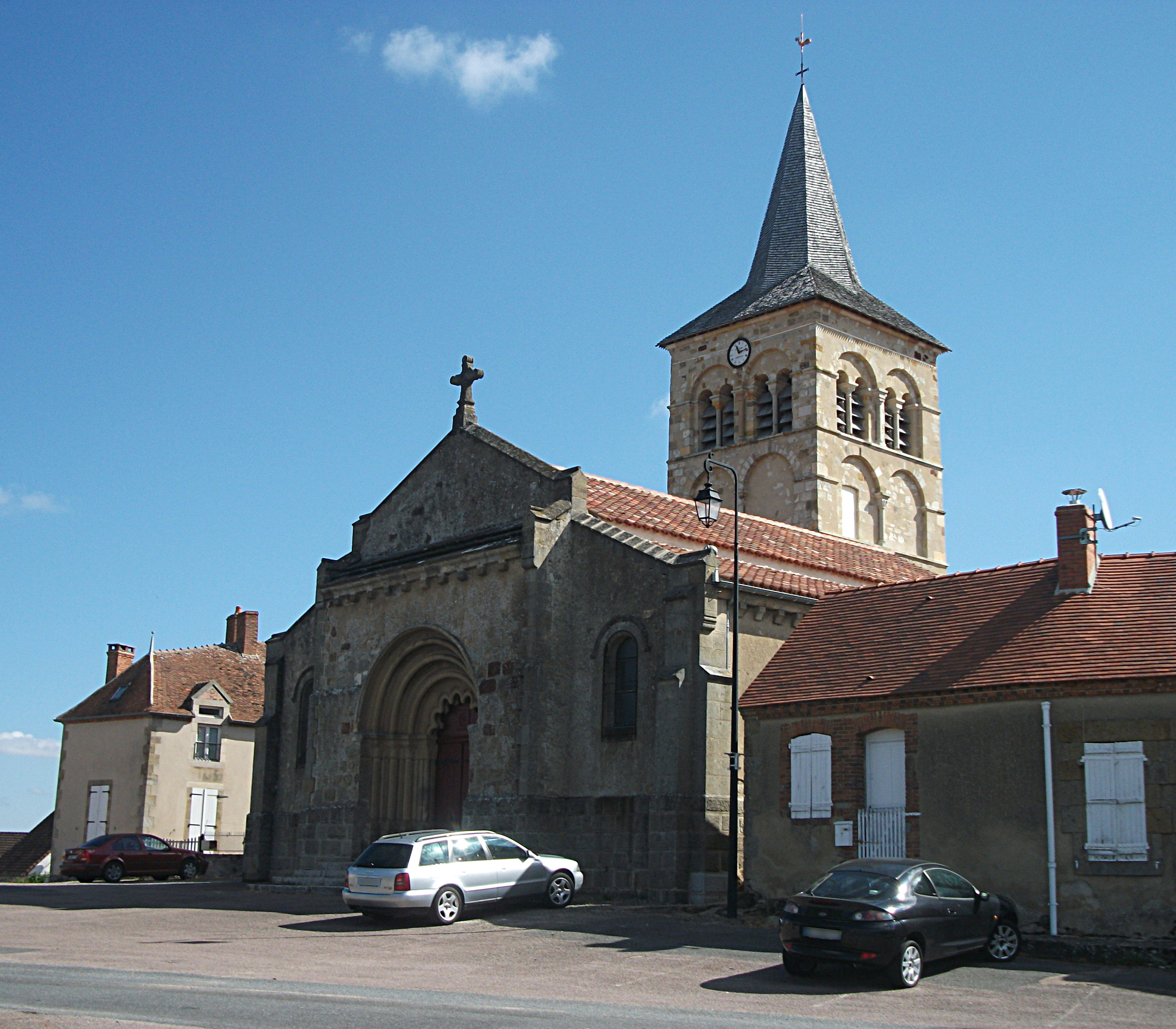
- Church
- Location of Bizeneuille
- Location within France Location within Auvergne-Rhône-Alpes
- Coordinates: 46°24′31″N 2°44′17″E
- Country: France
- Region: Auvergne-Rhône-Alpes
- Department: Allier
- Arrondissement: Montluçon
- Canton: Huriel
- Intercommunality: Commentry Montmarault Néris Communauté

Government
  - Mayor (2026–32): Daniel Collinet
- Area^{1}: 29.75 km^{2} (11.49 sq mi)
- Elevation: 300 m (980 ft)
- Highest elevation: 404 m (1,325 ft)
- Lowest elevation: 250 m (820 ft)
- Population (2023): 296
  - Density: 9.95/km^{2} (25.8/sq mi)
- Time zone: UTC+01:00 (CET)
  - Summer (DST): UTC+02:00 (CEST)
- INSEE/Postal code: 03031 /03170
- ^{1} French Land Register data, which excludes lakes, ponds, glaciers > 1 km^{2} (0.386 sq mi or 247 acres) and river estuaries.

Bizeneuille (French pronunciation: [biznœj]; Occitan: Bijanuelha) is a commune in the Allier department in central France.

== Population ==
Historical population
Year	Pop.	±% p.a.
1968	442	—
1975	350	−3.28%
1982	343	−0.29%
1990	292	−1.99%
1999	287	−0.19%
2007	294	+0.30%
2012	285	−0.62%
2017	294	+0.62%
2023	296	+0.11%
Source: INSEE

== See also ==
- Communes of the Allier department
