= Nassigny =

- Commune
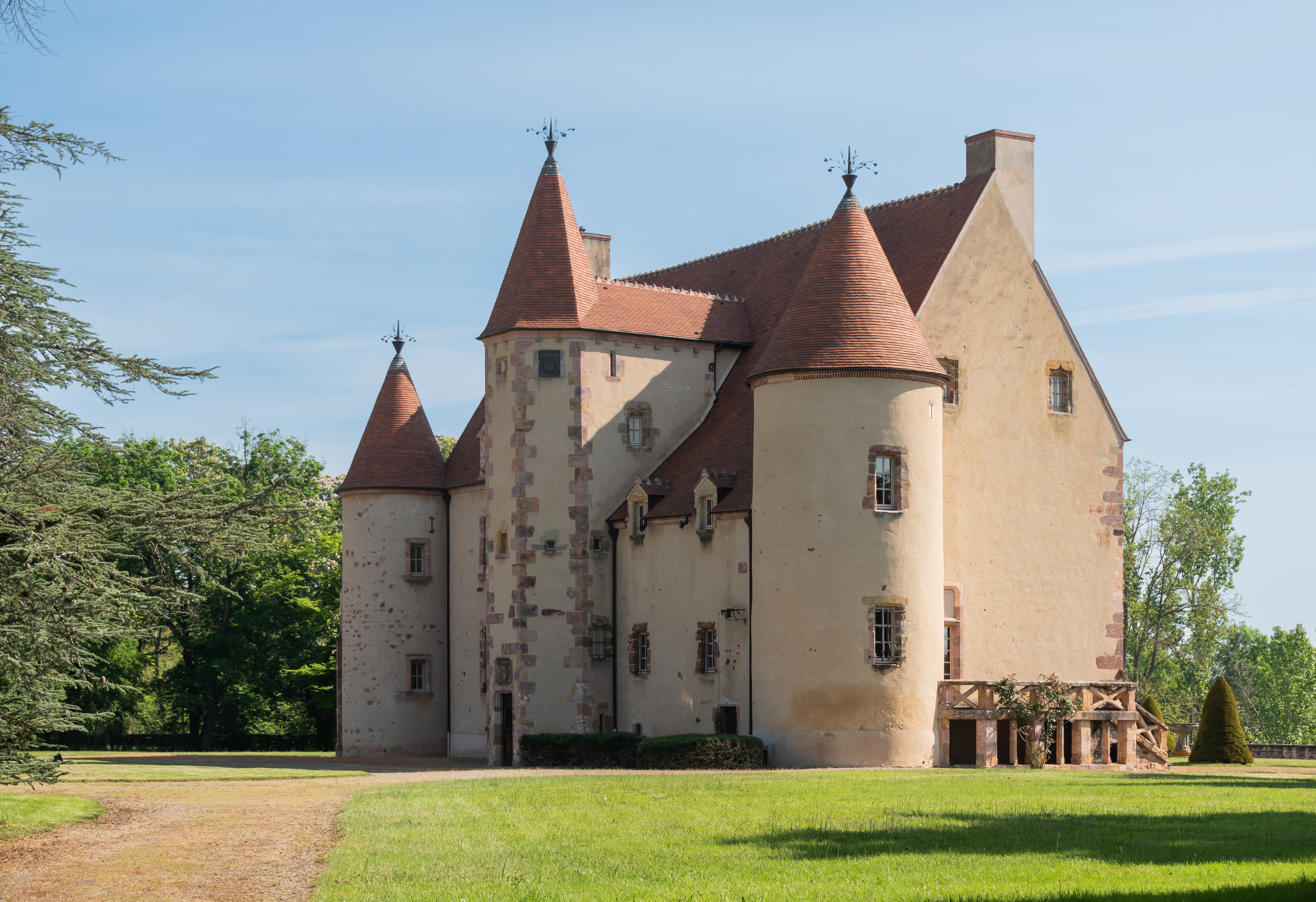
- The chateau in Nassigny
- Location of Nassigny
- Location within France Location within Auvergne-Rhône-Alpes
- Coordinates: 46°29′38″N 2°36′10″E
- Country: France
- Region: Auvergne-Rhône-Alpes
- Department: Allier
- Arrondissement: Montluçon
- Canton: Huriel
- Intercommunality: Val de Cher

Government
  - Mayor (2026–32): Francis Le Bas
- Area^{1}: 18.32 km^{2} (7.07 sq mi)
- Elevation: 190 m (620 ft)
- Highest elevation: 271 m (889 ft)
- Lowest elevation: 173 m (568 ft)
- Population (2023): 194
  - Density: 10.6/km^{2} (27.4/sq mi)
- Time zone: UTC+01:00 (CET)
  - Summer (DST): UTC+02:00 (CEST)
- INSEE/Postal code: 03193 /03190
- ^{1} French Land Register data, which excludes lakes, ponds, glaciers > 1 km^{2} (0.386 sq mi or 247 acres) and river estuaries.

Nassigny (French pronunciation: [nasiɲi]; Occitan: Nassinhac) is a commune in the Allier department in Auvergne in central France.

== Population ==
Historical population
Year	Pop.	±% p.a.
1968	181	—
1975	147	−2.93%
1982	150	+0.29%
1990	156	+0.49%
1999	145	−0.81%
2007	182	+2.88%
2012	197	+1.60%
2017	182	−1.57%
2023	194	+1.07%
Source: INSEE

== See also ==
- Communes of the Allier department
