= Venas =

- Commune
- Coat of arms
- Location of Venas
- Location within France Location within Auvergne-Rhône-Alpes
- Coordinates: 46°28′39″N 2°45′54″E
- Country: France
- Region: Auvergne-Rhône-Alpes
- Department: Allier
- Arrondissement: Montluçon
- Canton: Huriel
- Intercommunality: Commentry Montmarault Néris Communauté

Government
  - Mayor (2026–32): Eric Touraud
- Area^{1}: 32.15 km^{2} (12.41 sq mi)
- Elevation: 295 m (968 ft)
- Highest elevation: 293 m (961 ft)
- Lowest elevation: 210 m (690 ft)
- Population (2023): 217
  - Density: 6.75/km^{2} (17.5/sq mi)
- Time zone: UTC+01:00 (CET)
  - Summer (DST): UTC+02:00 (CEST)
- INSEE/Postal code: 03303 /03190
- ^{1} French Land Register data, which excludes lakes, ponds, glaciers > 1 km^{2} (0.386 sq mi or 247 acres) and river estuaries.

Venas is a commune in the Allier department in Auvergne-Rhône-Alpes in central France.

== Population ==
Historical population
| Year | Pop. | ±% p.a. |
|---|---|---|
| 1968 | 298 | — |
| 1975 | 285 | −0.64% |
| 1982 | 269 | −0.82% |
| 1990 | 247 | −1.06% |
| 1999 | 242 | −0.23% |
| 2007 | 236 | −0.31% |
| 2012 | 247 | +0.92% |
| 2017 | 235 | −0.99% |
| 2023 | 217 | −1.32% |
Source: INSEE

== See also ==
- Communes of the Allier department
