= Reugny, Allier =

Reugny
- Commune
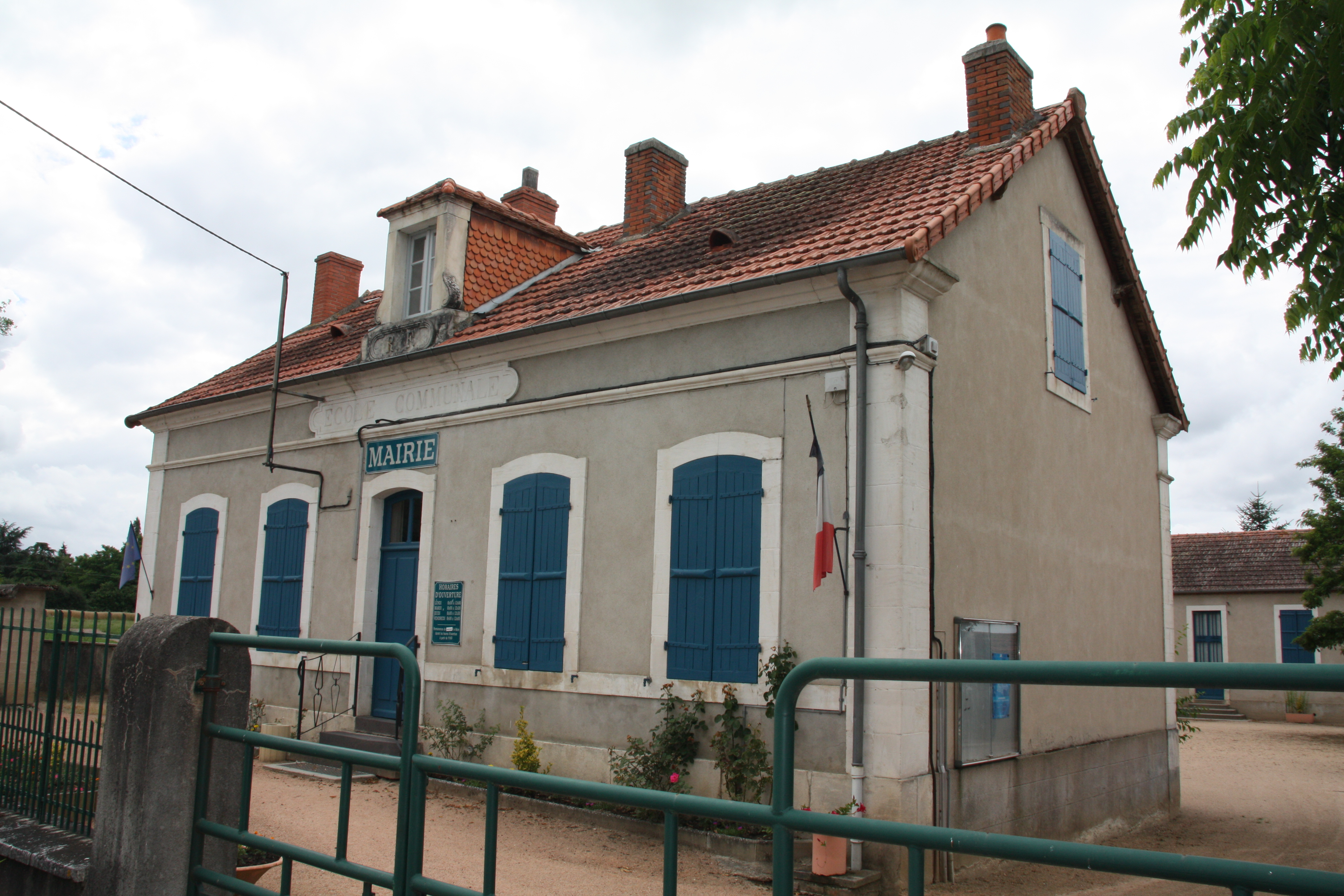
- The town hall in Reugny
- Location of Reugny
- Location within France Location within Auvergne-Rhône-Alpes
- Coordinates: 46°27′46″N 2°36′56″E
- Country: France
- Region: Auvergne-Rhône-Alpes
- Department: Allier
- Arrondissement: Montluçon
- Canton: Huriel
- Intercommunality: Val de Cher

Government
  - Mayor (2026–32): Philippe Charveron
- Area^{1}: 7.66 km^{2} (2.96 sq mi)
- Elevation: 204 m (669 ft)
- Highest elevation: 282 m (925 ft)
- Lowest elevation: 178 m (584 ft)
- Population (2023): 266
  - Density: 34.7/km^{2} (89.9/sq mi)
- Time zone: UTC+01:00 (CET)
  - Summer (DST): UTC+02:00 (CEST)
- INSEE/Postal code: 03213 /03190
- ^{1} French Land Register data, which excludes lakes, ponds, glaciers > 1 km^{2} (0.386 sq mi or 247 acres) and river estuaries.

Reugny (French pronunciation: [ʁøɲi]; Occitan: Runhèi) is a commune in the Allier department in Auvergne in central France.

== Population ==
Historical population
Year	Pop.	±% p.a.
1968	275	—
1975	280	+0.26%
1982	300	+0.99%
1990	263	−1.63%
1999	272	+0.37%
2007	262	−0.47%
2012	268	+0.45%
2017	249	−1.46%
2023	266	+1.11%
Source: INSEE

== See also ==
- Communes of the Allier department
