= Chambérat =

- Commune
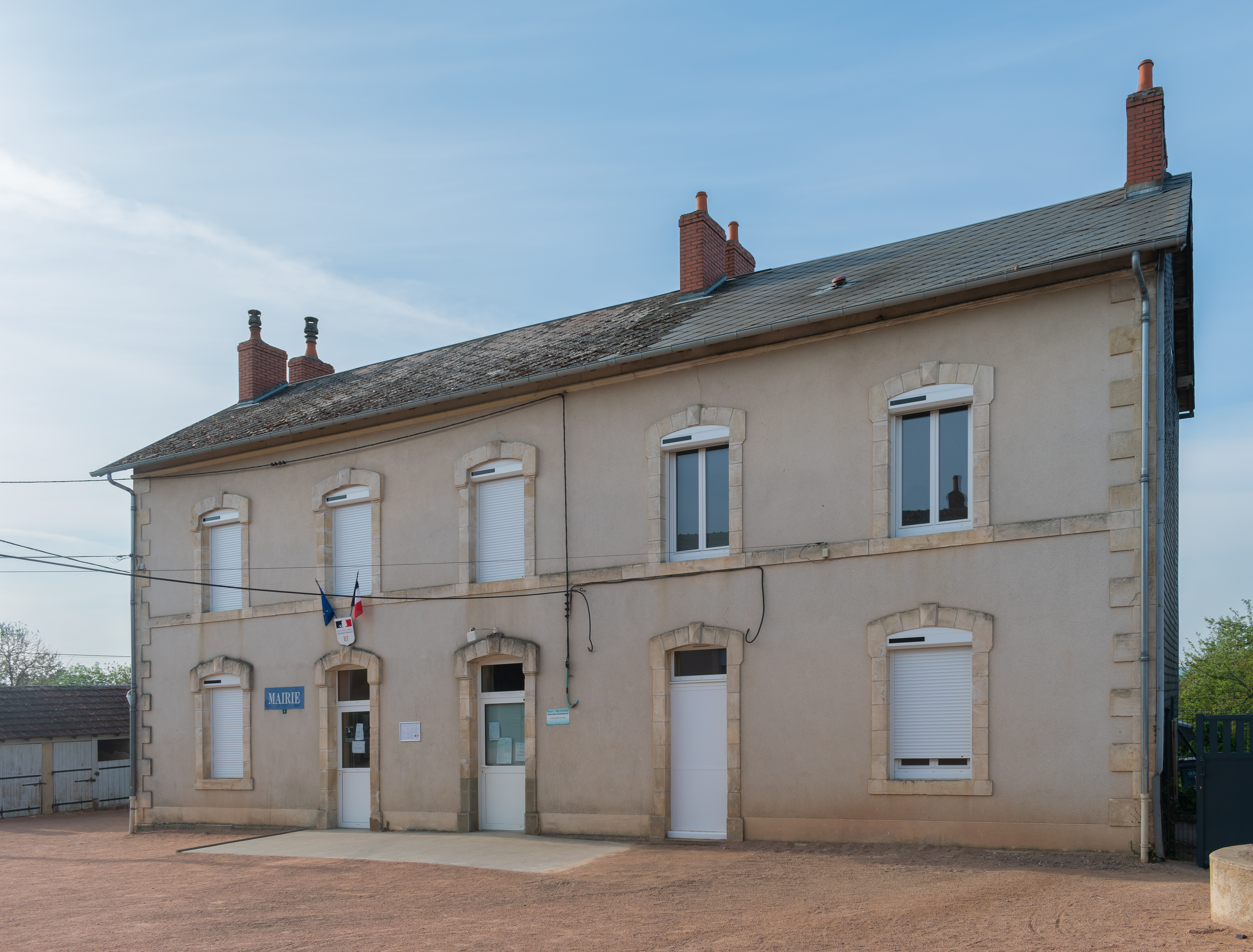
- Town hall of Chamberat
- Location of Chambérat
- Location within France Location within Auvergne-Rhône-Alpes
- Coordinates: 46°25′11″N 2°24′50″E
- Country: France
- Region: Auvergne-Rhône-Alpes
- Department: Allier
- Arrondissement: Montluçon
- Canton: Huriel
- Intercommunality: Pays d'Huriel

Government
  - Mayor (2026–32): Joël Rondier
- Area^{1}: 28.37 km^{2} (10.95 sq mi)
- Elevation: 423 m (1,388 ft)
- Highest elevation: 426 m (1,398 ft)
- Lowest elevation: 258 m (846 ft)
- Population (2023): 277
  - Density: 9.76/km^{2} (25.3/sq mi)
- Time zone: UTC+01:00 (CET)
  - Summer (DST): UTC+02:00 (CEST)
- INSEE/Postal code: 03051 /03370
- ^{1} French Land Register data, which excludes lakes, ponds, glaciers > 1 km^{2} (0.386 sq mi or 247 acres) and river estuaries.

Chambérat (French pronunciation: [ʃɑ̃beʁa]; Occitan: Chamberac) is a commune in the Allier department in central France.

== Population ==
Historical population
Year	Pop.	±% p.a.
1968	474	—
1975	403	−2.29%
1982	350	−1.99%
1990	332	−0.66%
1999	308	−0.83%
2007	311	+0.12%
2012	317	+0.38%
2017	305	−0.77%
2023	277	−1.59%
Source: INSEE

== See also ==
- Communes of the Allier department
