= Viplaix =

Commune in central France

- Commune
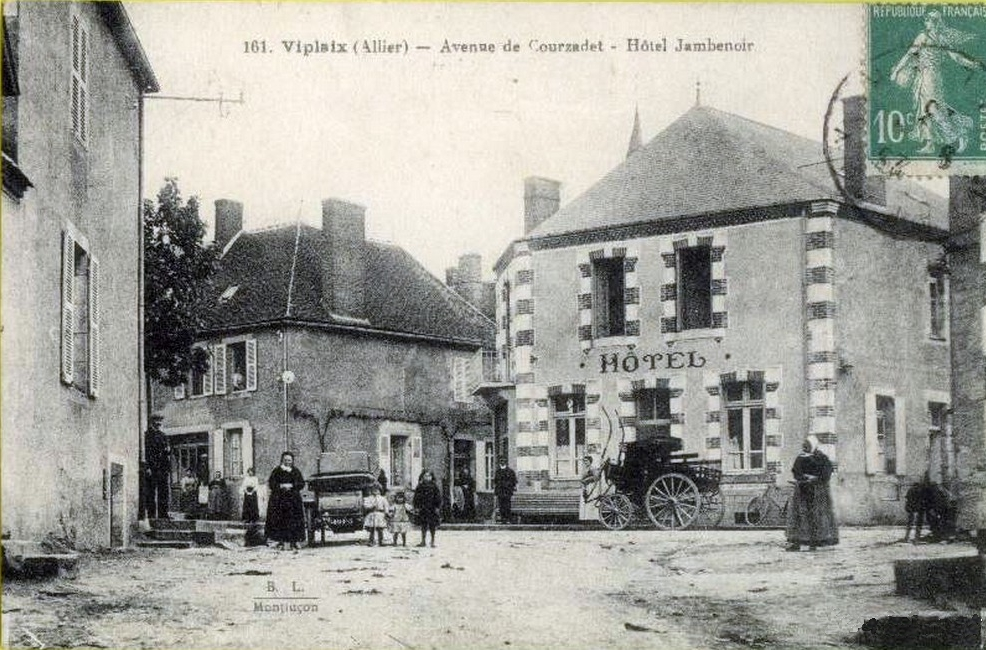

- Coat of arms
- Location of Viplaix
- Location within France Location within Auvergne-Rhône-Alpes
- Coordinates: 46°27′41″N 2°22′48″E
- Country: France
- Region: Auvergne-Rhône-Alpes
- Department: Allier
- Arrondissement: Montluçon
- Canton: Huriel
- Intercommunality: Pays d'Huriel

Government
  - Mayor (2026–32): Jean-Michel Palliot
- Area^{1}: 30.4 km^{2} (11.7 sq mi)
- Elevation: 357 m (1,171 ft)
- Highest elevation: 403 m (1,322 ft)
- Lowest elevation: 270 m (890 ft)
- Population (2023): 293
  - Density: 9.64/km^{2} (25.0/sq mi)
- Time zone: UTC+01:00 (CET)
  - Summer (DST): UTC+02:00 (CEST)
- INSEE/Postal code: 03317 /03370
- ^{1} French Land Register data, which excludes lakes, ponds, glaciers > 1 km^{2} (0.386 sq mi or 247 acres) and river estuaries.

Viplaix is a commune in the Allier department in Auvergne-Rhône-Alpes in central France.

== Population ==
Historical population
Year	Pop.	±% p.a.
1968	606	—
1975	473	−3.48%
1982	391	−2.68%
1990	348	−1.45%
1999	296	−1.78%
2007	274	−0.96%
2012	289	+1.07%
2017	300	+0.75%
2023	293	−0.39%
Source: INSEE

== See also ==
- Communes of the Allier department
