= Saint-Sauvier =

- Commune
- Coat of arms
- Location of Saint-Sauvier
- Location within France Location within Auvergne-Rhône-Alpes
- Coordinates: 46°23′13″N 2°19′55″E
- Country: France
- Region: Auvergne-Rhône-Alpes
- Department: Allier
- Arrondissement: Montluçon
- Canton: Huriel
- Intercommunality: Pays d'Huriel

Government
  - Mayor (2026–32): Raymond Lamy
- Area^{1}: 31.47 km^{2} (12.15 sq mi)
- Elevation: 470 m (1,540 ft)
- Highest elevation: 472 m (1,549 ft)
- Lowest elevation: 339 m (1,112 ft)
- Population (2023): 320
  - Density: 10/km^{2} (26/sq mi)
- Time zone: UTC+01:00 (CET)
  - Summer (DST): UTC+02:00 (CEST)
- INSEE/Postal code: 03259 /03370
- ^{1} French Land Register data, which excludes lakes, ponds, glaciers > 1 km^{2} (0.386 sq mi or 247 acres) and river estuaries.

Saint-Sauvier (French pronunciation: [sɛ̃ sovje]) is a commune in the Allier department in Auvergne-Rhône-Alpes in central France.

== Population ==
Historical population
Year	Pop.	±% p.a.
1968	616	—
1975	514	−2.55%
1982	441	−2.16%
1990	377	−1.94%
1999	330	−1.47%
2007	338	+0.30%
2012	351	+0.76%
2017	348	−0.17%
2023	320	−1.39%
Source: INSEE

== See also ==
- Communes of the Allier department
