= Le Brethon =

- Commune
- Coat of arms
- Location of Le Brethon
- Location within France Location within Auvergne-Rhône-Alpes
- Coordinates: 46°34′18″N 2°43′06″E
- Country: France
- Region: Auvergne-Rhône-Alpes
- Department: Allier
- Arrondissement: Montluçon
- Canton: Huriel
- Intercommunality: CC du Pays de Tronçais

Government
  - Mayor (2026–32): Mathieu de Lamarliere
- Area^{1}: 44.61 km^{2} (17.22 sq mi)
- Elevation: 350 m (1,150 ft)
- Highest elevation: 383 m (1,257 ft)
- Lowest elevation: 198 m (650 ft)
- Population (2023): 324
  - Density: 7.26/km^{2} (18.8/sq mi)
- Time zone: UTC+01:00 (CET)
  - Summer (DST): UTC+02:00 (CEST)
- INSEE/Postal code: 03041 /03350
- ^{1} French Land Register data, which excludes lakes, ponds, glaciers > 1 km^{2} (0.386 sq mi or 247 acres) and river estuaries.

Le Brethon (French pronunciation: [lə bʁətɔ̃]; Occitan: Lo Breton) is a commune in the Allier department in central France.

== Population ==
Historical population
Year	Pop.	±% p.a.
1968	582	—
1975	545	−0.93%
1982	481	−1.77%
1990	395	−2.43%
1999	352	−1.27%
2007	338	−0.51%
2012	347	+0.53%
2017	325	−1.30%
2023	324	−0.05%
Source: INSEE

== See also ==
- Communes of the Allier department
