= Cosne-d'Allier =

- Commune
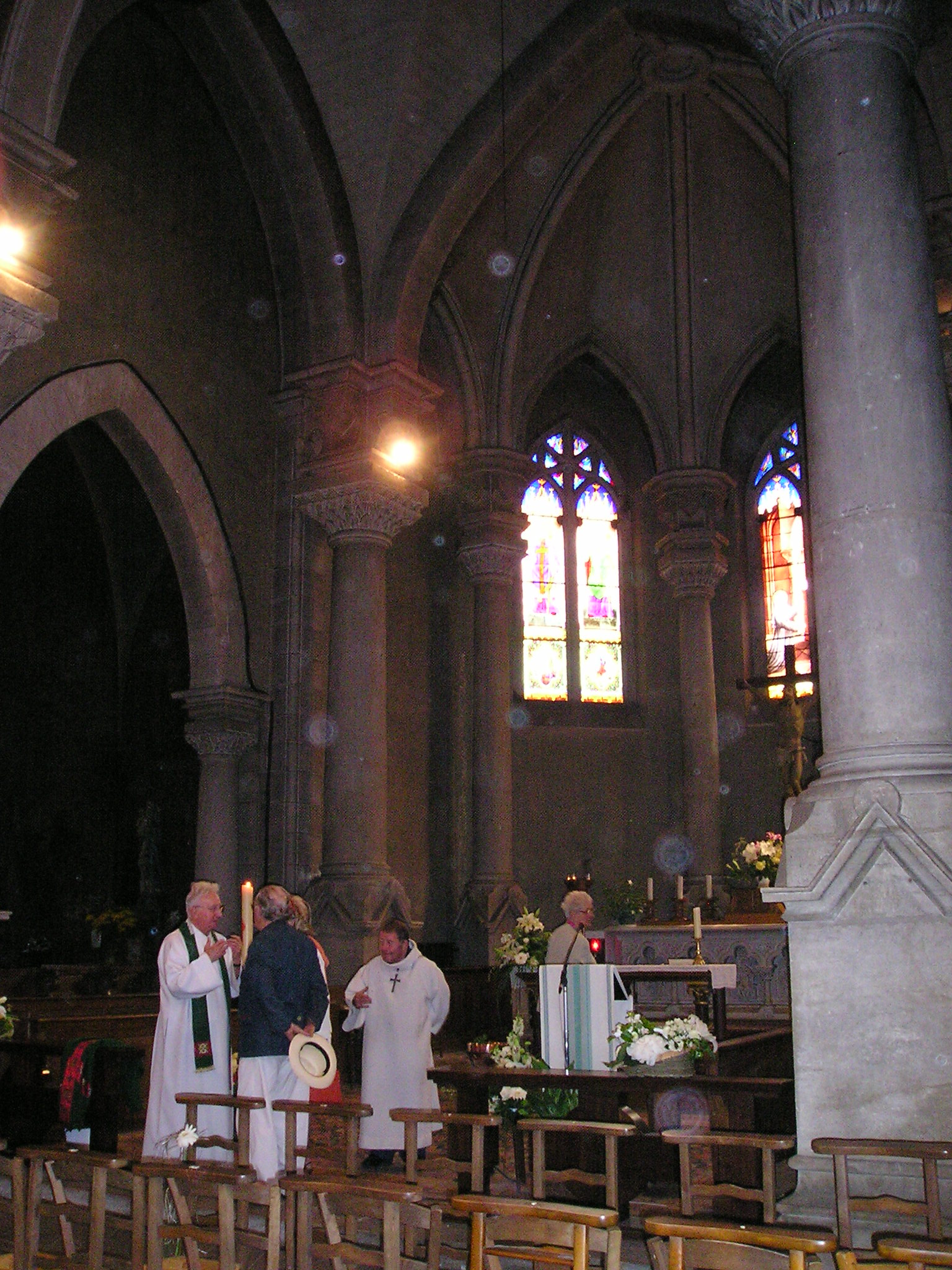
- Inside the church in Cosne-d'Allier

- Coat of arms
- Location of Cosne-d'Allier
- Location within France Location within Auvergne-Rhône-Alpes
- Coordinates: 46°28′34″N 2°49′56″E
- Country: France
- Region: Auvergne-Rhône-Alpes
- Department: Allier
- Arrondissement: Montluçon
- Canton: Huriel
- Intercommunality: Commentry Montmarault Néris Communauté

Government
  - Mayor (2026–32): Marie Carré
- Area^{1}: 25.29 km^{2} (9.76 sq mi)
- Elevation: 230 m (750 ft)
- Highest elevation: 312 m (1,024 ft)
- Lowest elevation: 217 m (712 ft)
- Population (2023): 2,006
  - Density: 79.32/km^{2} (205.4/sq mi)
- Time zone: UTC+01:00 (CET)
  - Summer (DST): UTC+02:00 (CEST)
- INSEE/Postal code: 03084 /03430
- ^{1} French Land Register data, which excludes lakes, ponds, glaciers > 1 km^{2} (0.386 sq mi or 247 acres) and river estuaries.

Cosne-d'Allier (French pronunciation: [kon dalje]; Occitan: Còse) is a commune in the Allier department in central France.

== Population ==
Historical population
Year	Pop.	±% p.a.
1968	2,197	—
1975	2,288	+0.58%
1982	2,454	+1.01%
1990	2,453	−0.01%
1999	2,407	−0.21%
2007	2,195	−1.15%
2012	2,194	−0.01%
2017	2,039	−1.45%
2023	2,006	−0.27%
Source: INSEE

== Sights ==
- Château de Petit-Bois

== See also ==
- Communes of the Allier department
