= Vallon-en-Sully =

- Commune
- Coat of arms
- Location of Vallon-en-Sully
- Location within France Location within Auvergne-Rhône-Alpes
- Coordinates: 46°32′13″N 2°36′32″E
- Country: France
- Region: Auvergne-Rhône-Alpes
- Department: Allier
- Arrondissement: Montluçon
- Canton: Huriel
- Intercommunality: Val de Cher

Government
  - Mayor (2026–32): Sébastien Prevost
- Area^{1}: 38.02 km^{2} (14.68 sq mi)
- Elevation: 180 m (590 ft)
- Highest elevation: 280 m (920 ft)
- Lowest elevation: 167 m (548 ft)
- Population (2023): 1,457
  - Density: 38.32/km^{2} (99.25/sq mi)
- Time zone: UTC+01:00 (CET)
  - Summer (DST): UTC+02:00 (CEST)
- INSEE/Postal code: 03297 /03190
- ^{1} French Land Register data, which excludes lakes, ponds, glaciers > 1 km^{2} (0.386 sq mi or 247 acres) and river estuaries.

Vallon-en-Sully (French pronunciation: [valɔ̃ ɑ̃ syli]) is a commune in the Allier department in Auvergne-Rhône-Alpes in central France.

It is home to a host of beautiful châteaux (i.e. castles), with the most notable being Le Creux.

== Population ==
Historical population
Year	Pop.	±% p.a.
1968	1,734	—
1975	1,677	−0.48%
1982	1,775	+0.81%
1990	1,809	+0.24%
1999	1,712	−0.61%
2007	1,717	+0.04%
2012	1,658	−0.70%
2017	1,564	−1.16%
2023	1,457	−1.17%
Source: INSEE

== See also ==
- Communes of the Allier department
