= Saint-Caprais, Allier =

Saint-Caprais
- Commune
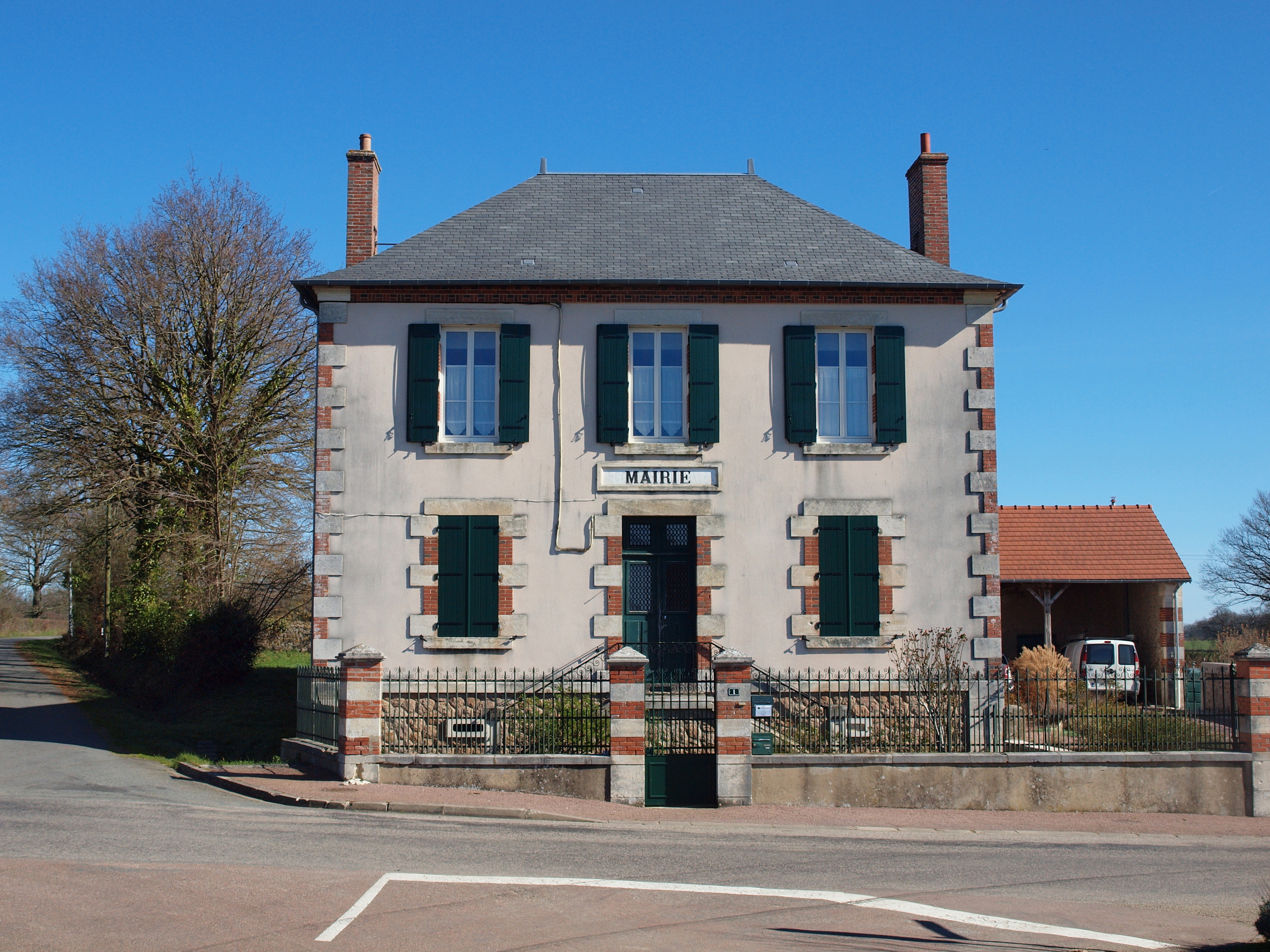
- Town hall
- Location of Saint-Caprais
- Location within France Location within Auvergne-Rhône-Alpes
- Coordinates: 46°33′05″N 2°44′13″E
- Country: France
- Region: Auvergne-Rhône-Alpes
- Department: Allier
- Arrondissement: Montluçon
- Canton: Huriel
- Intercommunality: CC du Pays de Tronçais

Government
  - Mayor (2026–32): Bernard Mollo
- Area^{1}: 20.14 km^{2} (7.78 sq mi)
- Elevation: 358 m (1,175 ft)
- Highest elevation: 407 m (1,335 ft)
- Lowest elevation: 217 m (712 ft)
- Population (2023): 103
  - Density: 5.11/km^{2} (13.2/sq mi)
- Time zone: UTC+01:00 (CET)
  - Summer (DST): UTC+02:00 (CEST)
- INSEE/Postal code: 03222 /03190
- ^{1} French Land Register data, which excludes lakes, ponds, glaciers > 1 km^{2} (0.386 sq mi or 247 acres) and river estuaries.

Saint-Caprais (French pronunciation: [sɛ̃ kapʁɛ]; Auvergnat: Sant Caprai) is a commune in the Allier department in Auvergne-Rhône-Alpes in central France.

== Population ==
Historical population
Year	Pop.	±% p.a.
1968	225	—
1975	165	−4.33%
1982	125	−3.89%
1990	112	−1.36%
1999	92	−2.16%
2007	91	−0.14%
2012	86	−1.12%
2017	90	+0.91%
2023	103	+2.27%
Source: INSEE

== See also ==
- Communes of the Allier department
