= Saint-Palais, Allier =

Saint-Palais
- Commune
- Location of Saint-Palais
- Location within France Location within Auvergne-Rhône-Alpes
- Coordinates: 46°26′25″N 2°18′03″E
- Country: France
- Region: Auvergne-Rhône-Alpes
- Department: Allier
- Arrondissement: Montluçon
- Canton: Huriel
- Intercommunality: Pays d'Huriel

Government
  - Mayor (2026–32): Sophie Loury
- Area^{1}: 20.3 km^{2} (7.8 sq mi)
- Elevation: 380 m (1,250 ft)
- Highest elevation: 448 m (1,470 ft)
- Lowest elevation: 304 m (997 ft)
- Population (2023): 163
  - Density: 8.03/km^{2} (20.8/sq mi)
- Time zone: UTC+01:00 (CET)
  - Summer (DST): UTC+02:00 (CEST)
- INSEE/Postal code: 03249 /03370
- ^{1} French Land Register data, which excludes lakes, ponds, glaciers > 1 km^{2} (0.386 sq mi or 247 acres) and river estuaries.

Saint-Palais (French pronunciation: [sɛ̃ palɛ]; Auvergnat: Sent Palai) is a commune in the Allier department in Auvergne-Rhône-Alpes in central France.

== Population ==
Historical population
| Year | Pop. | ±% p.a. |
|---|---|---|
| 1968 | 392 | — |
| 1975 | 267 | −5.34% |
| 1982 | 246 | −1.16% |
| 1990 | 204 | −2.31% |
| 1999 | 197 | −0.39% |
| 2007 | 191 | −0.39% |
| 2012 | 181 | −1.07% |
| 2017 | 164 | −1.95% |
| 2023 | 163 | −0.10% |
Source: INSEE

== See also ==
- Communes of the Allier department
