= Canton of Huriel =

Coordinates: 46°22′26″N 2°28′39″E

Huriel
- Canton
- Interactive map of Huriel
- Country: France
- Region: Auvergne-Rhône-Alpes
- Department: Allier
- No. of communes: {{{nbcomm}}}
- Area: 834.44 km^{2} (322.18 sq mi)
- Population (2023): 15,547
  - Density: 18.632/km^{2} (48.256/sq mi)
- INSEE code: 03 07

The canton of Huriel is an administrative division in central France. At the French canton reorganisation which came into effect in March 2015, the canton was expanded from 14 to 31 communes (3 of which merged into the new commune Haut-Bocage):

1. Archignat
2. Audes
3. Bizeneuille
4. Le Brethon
5. Chambérat
6. La Chapelaude
7. Chazemais
8. Cosne-d'Allier
9. Courçais
10. Estivareilles
11. Haut-Bocage
12. Hérisson
13. Huriel
14. Louroux-Bourbonnais
15. Mesples
16. Nassigny
17. Reugny
18. Saint-Caprais
19. Saint-Désiré
20. Saint-Éloy-d'Allier
21. Saint-Martinien
22. Saint-Palais
23. Saint-Sauvier
24. Sauvagny
25. Tortezais
26. Treignat
27. Vallon-en-Sully
28. Venas
29. Viplaix

== Demographics ==
Historical population
Year	Pop.	±% p.a.
2013	16,611	—
2018	15,958	−0.80%
Source: INSEE

== See also ==
- Cantons of the Allier department
- Communes of France
