= Estivareilles, Allier =

Estivareilles
- Commune
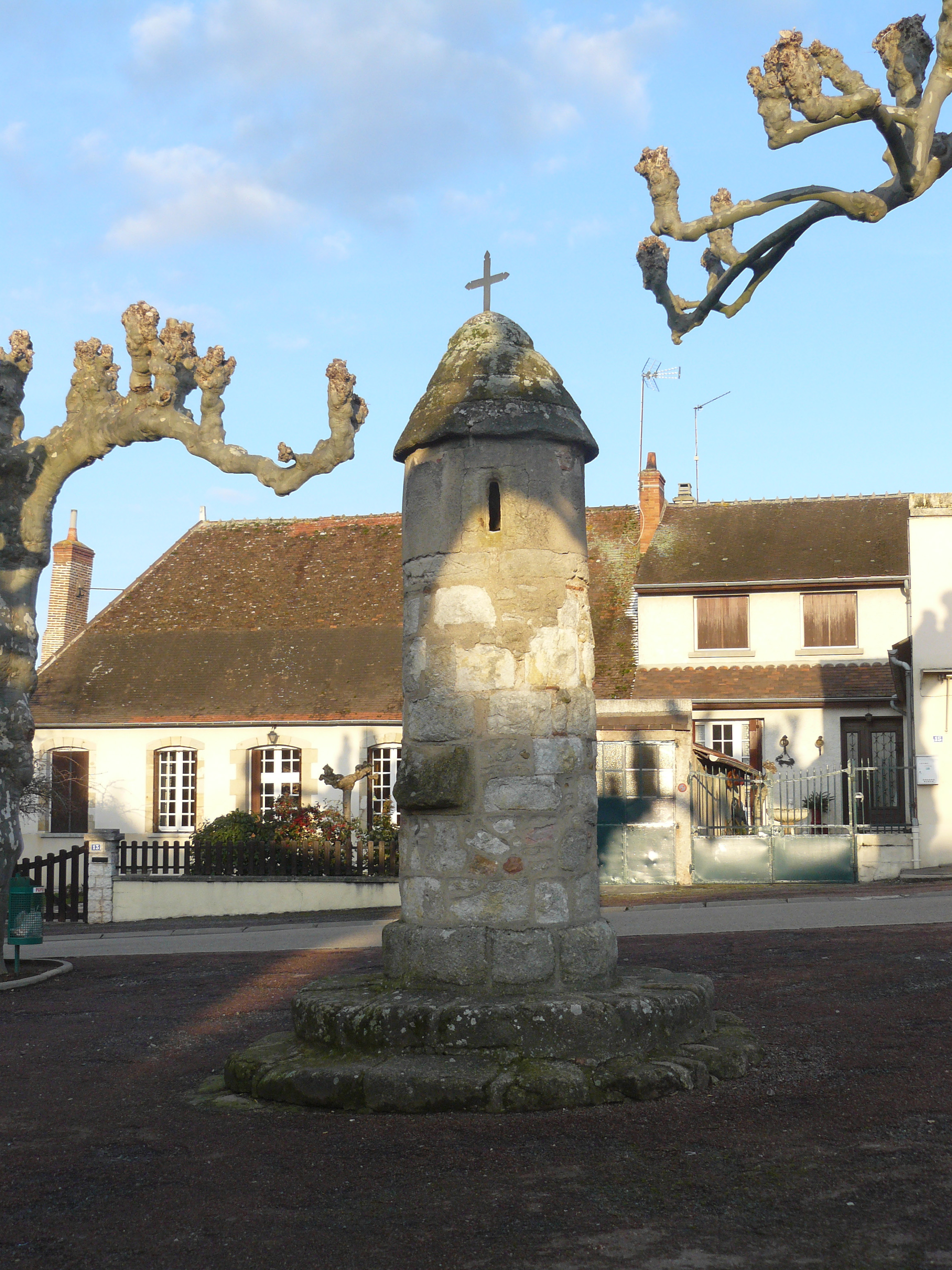
- Lantern of the dead
- Location of Estivareilles
- Location within France Location within Auvergne-Rhône-Alpes
- Coordinates: 46°25′34″N 2°37′10″E
- Country: France
- Region: Auvergne-Rhône-Alpes
- Department: Allier
- Arrondissement: Montluçon
- Canton: Huriel
- Intercommunality: Val de Cher

Government
  - Mayor (2026–32): Patrice Denizard
- Area^{1}: 11.27 km^{2} (4.35 sq mi)
- Elevation: 230 m (750 ft)
- Highest elevation: 348 m (1,142 ft)
- Lowest elevation: 179 m (587 ft)
- Population (2023): 1,119
  - Density: 99.29/km^{2} (257.2/sq mi)
- Time zone: UTC+01:00 (CET)
  - Summer (DST): UTC+02:00 (CEST)
- INSEE/Postal code: 03111 /03190
- ^{1} French Land Register data, which excludes lakes, ponds, glaciers > 1 km^{2} (0.386 sq mi or 247 acres) and river estuaries.

Estivareilles (French pronunciation: [ɛstivaʁɛj]; Occitan: Estivarelhas) is a commune in the Allier department in central France. It lies about 10 km north of Montluçon on the right-hand side of the Cher river. There is a Lavoir (a public washing basin), a lantern of the dead and a church from the nineteenth century.

== Population ==
Historical population
Year	Pop.	±% p.a.
1968	863	—
1975	939	+1.21%
1982	1,101	+2.30%
1990	1,104	+0.03%
1999	1,033	−0.74%
2007	1,008	−0.31%
2012	1,127	+2.26%
2017	1,103	−0.43%
2023	1,119	+0.24%
Source: INSEE

== See also ==
- Communes of the Allier department
