= Cantons of the Allier department =

The cantons of the Allier department of France, have number 19 since the cantonal realignment of 2014. Prior to 2014, Allier had 33 cantons.

== Current composition ==
Detailed list of the Cantons of the Allier department
#	Canton name	Centralizing office	Population (2018)	Number of communes	Communal composition of the canton
1	Bellerive-sur-Allier	Bellerive-sur-Allier	18,432	11	Bellerive-sur-Allier, Broût-Vernet, Brugheas, Cognat-Lyonne, Escurolles, Espinasse-Vozelle, Hauterive, Saint-Didier-la-Forêt, Saint-Pont, Serbannes, Vendat.
2	Bourbon-l'Archambault	Bourbon-l'Archambault	17,204	28	Ainay-le-Château, Bourbon-l'Archambault, Braize, Buxières-les-Mines, Cérilly, Château-sur-Allier, Couleuvre, Couzon, Franchesse, Isle-et-Bardais, Lételon, Limoise, Lurcy-Lévis, Meaulne-Vitray, Neure, Pouzy-Mésangy, Saint-Aubin-le-Monial, Saint-Bonnet-Tronçais, Saint-Hilaire, Saint-Léopardin-d'Augy, Saint-Plaisir, Theneuille, Urçay, Valigny, Le Veurdre, Vieure, Le Vilhain, Ygrande.
3	Commentry	Commentry	18,885	24	Beaune-d'Allier, Bézenet, Blomard, Chamblet, Chappes, Chavenon, Colombier, Commentry, Deneuille-les-Mines, Doyet, Hyds, Louroux-de-Beaune, Malicorne, Montmarault, Montvicq, Murat, Saint-Angel, Saint-Bonnet-de-Four, Saint-Marcel-en-Murat, Saint-Priest-en-Murat, Sazeret, Verneix, Vernusse, Villefranche-d'Allier.
4	Cusset	Cusset	17,928	4	Bost, Creuzier-le-Neuf, Creuzier-le-Vieux, Cusset.
5	Dompierre-sur-Besbre	Dompierre-sur-Besbre	20,698	32	Avrilly, Beaulon, Le Bouchaud, La Chapelle-aux-Chasses, Chassenard, Chevagnes, Chézy, Coulanges, Diou, Dompierre-sur-Besbre, Le Donjon, Gannay-sur-Loire, Garnat-sur-Engièvre, Lenax, Loddes, Luneau, Lusigny, Molinet, Monétay-sur-Loire, Montaiguët-en-Forez, Montcombroux-les-Mines, Neuilly-en-Donjon, Paray-le-Frésil, Pierrefitte-sur-Loire, Le Pin, Saint-Didier-en-Donjon, Saint-Léger-sur-Vouzance, Saint-Martin-des-Lais, Saint-Pourçain-sur-Besbre, Saligny-sur-Roudon, Thiel-sur-Acolin, Vaumas.
6	Gannat	Gannat	19,635	41	Barberier, Bègues, Bellenaves, Biozat, Chantelle, Chareil-Cintrat, Charmes, Charroux, Chezelle, Chirat-l'Église, Chouvigny, Coutansouze, Deneuille-lès-Chantelle, Ébreuil, Échassières, Étroussat, Fleuriel, Fourilles, Gannat, Jenzat, Lalizolle, Louroux-de-Bouble, Le Mayet-d'École, Mazerier, Monestier, Monteignet-sur-l'Andelot, Nades, Naves, Poëzat, Saint-Bonnet-de-Rochefort, Saint-Germain-de-Salles, Saint-Priest-d'Andelot, Saulzet, Sussat, Target, Taxat-Senat, Ussel-d'Allier, Valignat, Veauce, Vicq, Voussac.
7	Huriel	Huriel	16,544	31	Archignat, Audes, Bizeneuille, Le Brethon, Chambérat, La Chapelaude, Chazemais, Cosne-d'Allier, Courçais, Estivareilles, Givarlais, Hérisson, Huriel, Louroux-Bourbonnais, Louroux-Hodement, Maillet, Mesples, Nassigny, Reugny, Saint-Caprais, Saint-Désiré, Saint-Éloy-d'Allier, Saint-Martinien, Saint-Palais, Saint-Sauvier, Sauvagny, Tortezais, Treignat, Vallon-en-Sully, Venas, Viplaix.
8	Lapalisse	Lapalisse	18,482	31	Andelaroche, Arfeuilles, Arronnes, Barrais-Bussolles, Billezois, Le Breuil, Busset, La Chabanne, La Chapelle, Châtel-Montagne, Châtelus, Droiturier, Ferrières-sur-Sichon, La Guillermie, Isserpent, Lapalisse, Laprugne, Lavoine, Mariol, Le Mayet-de-Montagne, Molles, Nizerolles, Périgny, Saint-Christophe, Saint-Clément, Saint-Étienne-de-Vicq, Saint-Nicolas-des-Biefs, Saint-Pierre-Laval, Saint-Prix, Servilly, Le Vernet.
9	Montluçon-1	Montluçon	12,079 + part of Montluçon	3 + part of Montluçon	
10	Montluçon-2	Montluçon	4,348 + part of Montluçon	1 + part of Montluçon	
11	Montluçon-3	Montluçon	8,653 + part of Montluçon	14 + part of Montluçon	
12	Montluçon-4	Montluçon	6,289 + part of Montluçon	6 + part of Montluçon	
13	Moulins-1	Moulins	7,022 + part of Moulins	6 + part of Moulins	
14	Moulins-2	Moulins	10,569 + part of Moulins	22 + part of Moulins	
15	Saint-Pourçain-sur-Sioule	Saint-Pourçain-sur-Sioule	19,115	22	Bayet, Billy, Boucé, Créchy, Langy, Loriges, Louchy-Montfand, Magnet, Marcenat, Montaigu-le-Blin, Montoldre, Montord, Paray-sous-Briailles, Rongères, Saint-Félix, Saint-Gérand-le-Puy, Saint-Loup, Saint-Pourçain-sur-Sioule, Sanssat, Saulcet, Seuillet, Varennes-sur-Allier.
16	Souvigny	Souvigny	15,360	29	Agonges, Autry-Issards, Besson, Bransat, Bresnay, Bressolles, Cesset, Châtel-de-Neuvre, Châtillon, Chemilly, Contigny, Cressanges, Deux-Chaises, Gipcy, Laféline, Marigny, Meillard, Meillers, Monétay-sur-Allier, Le Montet, Noyant-d'Allier, Rocles, Saint-Menoux, Saint-Sornin, Souvigny, Le Theil, Treban, Tronget, Verneuil-en-Bourbonnais.
17	Vichy-1	Vichy	6,023 + part of Vichy	3 + part of Vichy	
18	Vichy-2	Vichy	5,489 + part of Vichy	2 + part of Vichy	
19	Yzeure	Yzeure	17,387	6	Aurouër, Gennetines, Saint-Ennemond, Trévol, Villeneuve-sur-Allier, Yzeure.
			342,908	320	
