= Canton of Montluçon-Est =

Coordinates: 46°20′27″N 2°36′12″E

Montluçon-Est (4th Canton)
- Former canton
- Interactive map of Montluçon-Est (4th Canton)
- Country: France
- Region: Auvergne-Rhône-Alpes
- Department: Allier
- No. of communes: {{{nbcomm}}}
- Disbanded: 2015
- Population (2012): 13,863

The canton of Montluçon-Est is a former administrative division in central France. It was disbanded following the French canton reorganisation which came into effect in March 2015. It had 13,863 inhabitants (2012).

The canton comprised the following communes:

- Chamblet
- Deneuille-les-Mines
- Désertines
- Montluçon (partly)
- Saint-Angel
- Verneix

== Demographics ==
Historical population
Year	Pop.	±%
1990	15,453	—
1999	15,035	−2.7%
2012	13,863	−7.8%

== See also ==
- Cantons of the Allier department
