= Amable de Courtais =

French soldier and politician

Amable-Gaspard-Henri, vicomte de Courtais
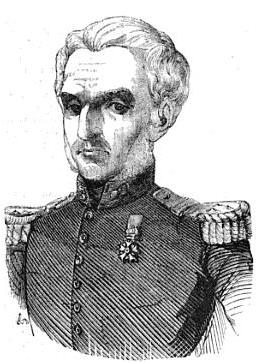
- Portrait from Charles Dupressoir, Causes célèbres de tous les peuples, première série, 1849
- Born: 10 January 1790; Montluçon, Allier, France
- Died: 10 June 1877 (aged 87); Doyet, Allier, France
- Occupations: Soldier and politician

Amable-Gaspard-Henri, vicomte de Courtais (10 January 1790 – 10 June 1877) was a French soldier and politician. During the Second French Republic he was made a General and head of the National Guard of Paris. He failed to suppress the invasion of the Constituent Assembly by a mob on 15 May 1848 and was accused of being a traitor, but was later acquitted.

== Early years ==
Amable-Gaspard-Henri, vicomte de Courtais belonged to a Bourbonnais family that had been settled in Doyet for several generations since the marriage of Gilbert de Courtais with Isabeau de La Souche, heiress of the fief and château of la Souche. The family also owned the château of Chassignole at Doyet. Amable de Courtais was born on 10 January 1790 in Montluçon, Allier. He served in the army under Napoleon and during the Bourbon Restoration. On 5 September 1813 he was granted the Knight's Cross of the Legion of Honor. He retired with the rank of cavalry squadron leader.

Courtais had strong democratic views. On 9 July 1842 he was elected to the National Assembly for the fourth college of Allier (Montlucon). His predecessor, Charles Gilbert Tourret, had resigned so he could be elected. The election went to a second round, in which Courtais was elected. He took his seat on the far left. He was reelected on 1 August 1846. He was a signatory in 1848 to the demand for impeachment of the ministry of François Guizot.

== Second republic ==
The provisional government invited Courtais to assume the rank of General and the command of the National Guard of Paris. On 23 April 1848 he was elected by a decisive majority to represent Allier in the Constituent Assembly. He was both a representative and leader of the National Guard when the Assembly was invaded by the mob on 15 May 1848. General Courtais acted indecisively, and told the guard not to use force against the people. Some managed to enter, but most tried to enter through the rue de Bourgogne, where they found the gate closed and began trying to break it down. Courtais tried to harangue the crowd and persuade them to disperse, but with no effect. The crowd forced through the gate, knocking him down, and great confusion followed. The few guardsmen who were present ran for their arms.

Courtais went to Alphonse de Lamartine for advice, but although he was told to place himself at the head of his troops, he continued to wander around without doing anything. He returned to the Assembly at five o'clock, when the room had been emptied of demonstrators. He then told the National Guard to withdraw. He was attacked by some of the representatives, who called him a traitor, seized his sword and stripped off his epaulets. Other representatives intervened, and took him to the library where he was held in custody. Léon Faucher formally proposed that the general be declared a traitor. Courtais submitted to a year of pre-trial detention before being given his freedom by the High Court of Bourges on 2 April 1849. He returned to the Constituent Assembly, and participated in its final sessions in April and May 1849. He then left politics.

In 1871, Courtois was elected to the general council of Allier representing the canton of Montmarault. Courtais died on 10 June 1877 in Doyet, Allier. He was aged 87.
