= Charles Gilbert Tourret =

French politician (1795–1858)

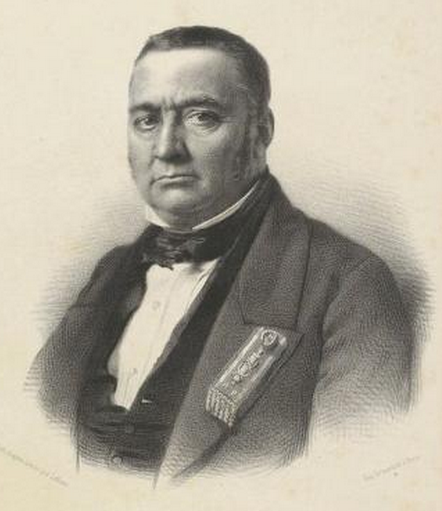
- Portrait by Jean-Baptiste-Adolphe Lafosse
- Born: 22 December 1795; Montmarault, Allier, France
- Died: 17 May 1858 (aged 62)
- Occupations: Agronomist and politician
- Known for: Minister of Agriculture

Charles Gilbert Tourret (22 December 1795 – 17 May 1858) was a French agronomist and politician who was Minister of Agriculture in 1848. He was instrumental in obtaining support for a new system of education of agricultural workers, farmers and proprietors.

== Early years ==
Charles-Gilbert Tourret was born in Montmarault, Allier, on 22 December 1795. He entered the École Polytechnique in 1814 and graduated as an engineer of roads and bridges. He began a career as a senior official, but then turned to the study and practice of agriculture in his native department. This became his lifetime passion, and he became known as an expert in agronomy.

== Politician ==
Tourret ran for election on 21 June 1834 for the college of Allier, Montluçon, but was defeated. He ran again for the same constituency on 4 November 1837 and was elected. He sat among the opposition. He was reelected on 2 March 1839. He resigned in 1842 to give his seat to General Amable de Courtais. He ran again on 1 August 1846 but was defeated. From 1842 to 1852 Tourret was a member of the general council on agriculture.

After the revolution of 1848 Tourret joined the Republican group. For a period he acted as provisional head of government of Allier. He was returned for Allier to the Constituent Assembly in the elections on 23 April 1848. He was opposed to the institution of two chambers, and to the proposal to dissolve the Constituent Assembly before the organic laws had been passed. He opposed the expedition to Rome.

Tourret was among the moderate Republicans in the Constitutional Commission. He was among 18 deputies charged with preparing a first draft of a new constitution. They met from 19 May 1848 to 17 June 1848. Tourret caused a proposal to guarantee savings banks to be rejected, due to fears raised by the near-bankruptcy of the state in February and March of that year. He opposed appointment of local officials by the executive in favor of election by municipal councils, a small step towards decentralization.

== Minister ==
On 28 June 1848 General Louis-Eugène Cavaignac chose Tourret as Minister of Agriculture in his new cabinet. As minister, Tourret defended a law to establish a three-tier system of agricultural education. Farm schools would give a practical education to laborers and smallholders, including hands-on training. Regional schools would give a rather more theoretical education, with a solid practical foundation, for proprietors and farmers. A national agronomic institute would train professors and administrators. The national institute would recruit professors from the "summits of science". To attract them it would have to be located close to Paris, but in a rural area with gardens, farms and forests. Versailles would be a suitable location, available now that the king had been deposed. Courses would have a two-year duration, and the three best pupils each year would receive three-year scholarships to pursue agricultural studies.

Tourret's proposal was submitted to the agriculture and farm credit committee of the Assembly, which proposed various amendments. The rapporteur was citizen Antoine Richard du Cantal, who noted that cultivators had long been neglected by previous regimes, and presented the project as a great revolutionary measure. Richard added the objective of instilling love of the Republic to that of instilling love of the land. The text was debated in the Assembly on 22 September 1848, and received a generally favorable reception.

The project was criticized on the basis of costs. One member suggested that children studying at the elementary level should continue to work in the fields, receiving education in the mornings or evenings. Others felt the education should be limited to farmer-proprietors, since they alone would cause progress to be made in agriculture in France. Amable Dubois felt that there were no qualified teachers, and that the peasants would resist any form of theoretical instruction. The royalists were the most hostile to the project of educating the workers.

The debate between supporters and opponents was heated. Eventually, on 3 October 1848, the decree for agricultural education and creation of agricultural schools was adopted by 579 out of 679 votes. The only major amendment was to align the schools with departments rather than arrondissements. Tourret also conceived of the idea of an international exposition, but this was abandoned due to the uncertainty of the times and the claims of other projects.

== Later years ==
Tourret resigned with the rest of the cabinet on 20 December 1848 after General Cavaignac was defeated in the Presidential elections. He took a position of mild opposition to the government of Louis Napoleon. After his resignation Tourret refused to sit as a member of the Legislative Assembly. He devoted the last years of his life to agriculture. He died on 17 May 1858, aged 62.
