= Canton of Commentry =

Coordinates: 46°17′23″N 2°44′32″E

Commentry
- Canton
- Interactive map of Commentry
- Country: France
- Region: Auvergne-Rhône-Alpes
- Department: Allier
- No. of communes: {{{nbcomm}}}
- Area: 474.01 km^{2} (183.02 sq mi)
- Population (2023): 17,803
  - Density: 37.558/km^{2} (97.275/sq mi)
- INSEE code: 03 03

The canton of Commentry is an administrative division in central France. At the French canton reorganisation which came into effect in March 2015, the canton was expanded from 4 to 24 communes:

1. Beaune-d'Allier
2. Bézenet
3. Blomard
4. Chamblet
5. Chappes
6. Chavenon
7. Colombier
8. Commentry
9. Deneuille-les-Mines
10. Doyet
11. Hyds
12. Louroux-de-Beaune
13. Malicorne
14. Montmarault
15. Montvicq
16. Murat
17. Saint-Angel
18. Saint-Bonnet-de-Four
19. Saint-Marcel-en-Murat
20. Saint-Priest-en-Murat
21. Sazeret
22. Verneix
23. Vernusse
24. Villefranche-d'Allier

== Demographics ==
Historical population
Year	Pop.	±% p.a.
2013	18,796	—
2018	18,276	−0.56%
Source: INSEE

== See also ==
- Cantons of the Allier department
- Communes of France
