= Théophile Alajouanine =

French neurologist (1890–1980)

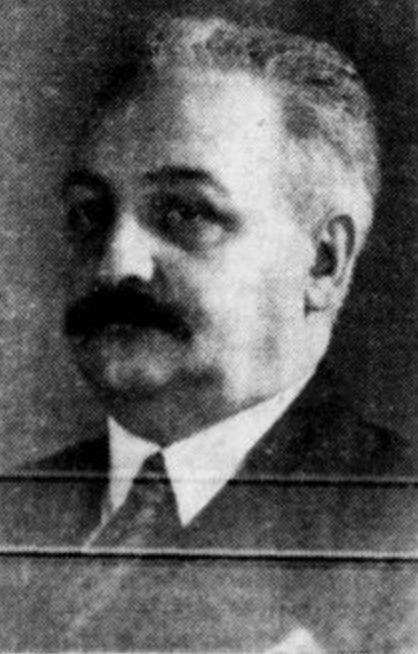

Théophile Alajouanine (French: [teofil alaʒuanin]; 12 June 1890 – 2 May 1980) was a French neurologist.

Théophile Alajouanine was born in Verneix, Allier. He was a student of Joseph Jules Dejerine and a colleague of Georges Guillain and Charles Foix. He was a prolific writer on many topics but was particularly interested in aphasia.

Alajouanine was a scholar and bibliophile who maintained close relationships with several prominent writers during his career as a neurologist and neuropsychologist. He drew on the biography and works of Fyodor Dostoevsky to inform his understanding of epilepsy. He also served as the neurologist for the composer Maurice Ravel and published an account of the composer’s aphasia.

The Laboratoire Théophile-Alajouanine, Centre hospitalier Côte-des-Neiges, Montréal is named after him.

== Biography ==
Théophile Alajouanine is the son of Antoine Alajouanine, a blacksmith in Verneix(Allier), and Marie Duprat.

He attended secondary school at the Marist College in Moulins and studied medicine in Paris. He became a hospital intern in 1913, and his internship, interrupted by World War I lasted six years. It was under the influence of mentors such as Alexandre-Achille Souques and, above all,Charles Foix that he turned his attention to Neurology. He also received solid training in psychiatry, notably with Philippe Chaslin. He then went on to become head of the Neurology diseases clinic (in 1923), hospital physician (in 1926), and associate professor of neurology in Professor Georges Guillain department, a position he held until 1936.

Professor Alajouanine devoted his entire youth to studying Neuropathology problems and identified syndromes that bear his name. He published several hundred articles in the Revue neurologique. He contributed to the development of Neuropsychology by focusing on the Semiotics, mechanisms, and rehabilitation of Aphasia. In the 1950s, a group of clinicians formed around him whose work proved particularly fruitful and who became known as the Salpêtrière School of Semiology.

He was also the director of Jacques Lacan first presentation of patients to the Paris Neurological Society in 1926.

Théophile Alajouanine had a dual career as a neurologist and writer. His book on Valery Larbaud, whom he cared for for twenty-two years, his friendship with Paul Valéry, and his many Poet friends bear witness to this. He conducted a semiological analysis of the neurological disease that Maurice Ravel suffered from at the end of his life. His book Aphasie et le langage pathologique (Aphasia and Pathological Language) was awarded a prize by the Académie Française in 1970.

As for his political views, he was a royalist and a member of Action Française. He was supposed to be one of the speakers at a rally in May 1936, which was banned by the authorities. He publicly praised Charles Maurras at a meeting organized in 1937 to mark the release from prison of the master of “integral nationalism” and again at a meeting of Action française students, which he chaired, in 1938. He participated in the annual medical banquets of Action Française and presided over the 1933 banquet and those of the Cercle Fustel de Coulanges.

He was still present at the Action Française medical banquet in 1963, which revived the tradition of banquets that had been interrupted since 1939.

Attached to his native region, he purchased the Château de Chalouze in Lalizolle(Allier) around 1935.

He married Maud Jennings on June 15, 1920. From this union, a single daughter, Marie-Elisabeth (1921–2002), was born.

== Associated eponyms ==
- Foix–Alajouanine syndrome: a rare disease of the spinal cord characterized by dysfunction of the spinal cord due to a dural arteriovenous malformation.
- Marie–Foix–Alajouanine syndrome: ataxia of the cerebellum in advanced age. Frequently due to abuse of alcohol.
