= Louroux-de-Beaune =

- Commune
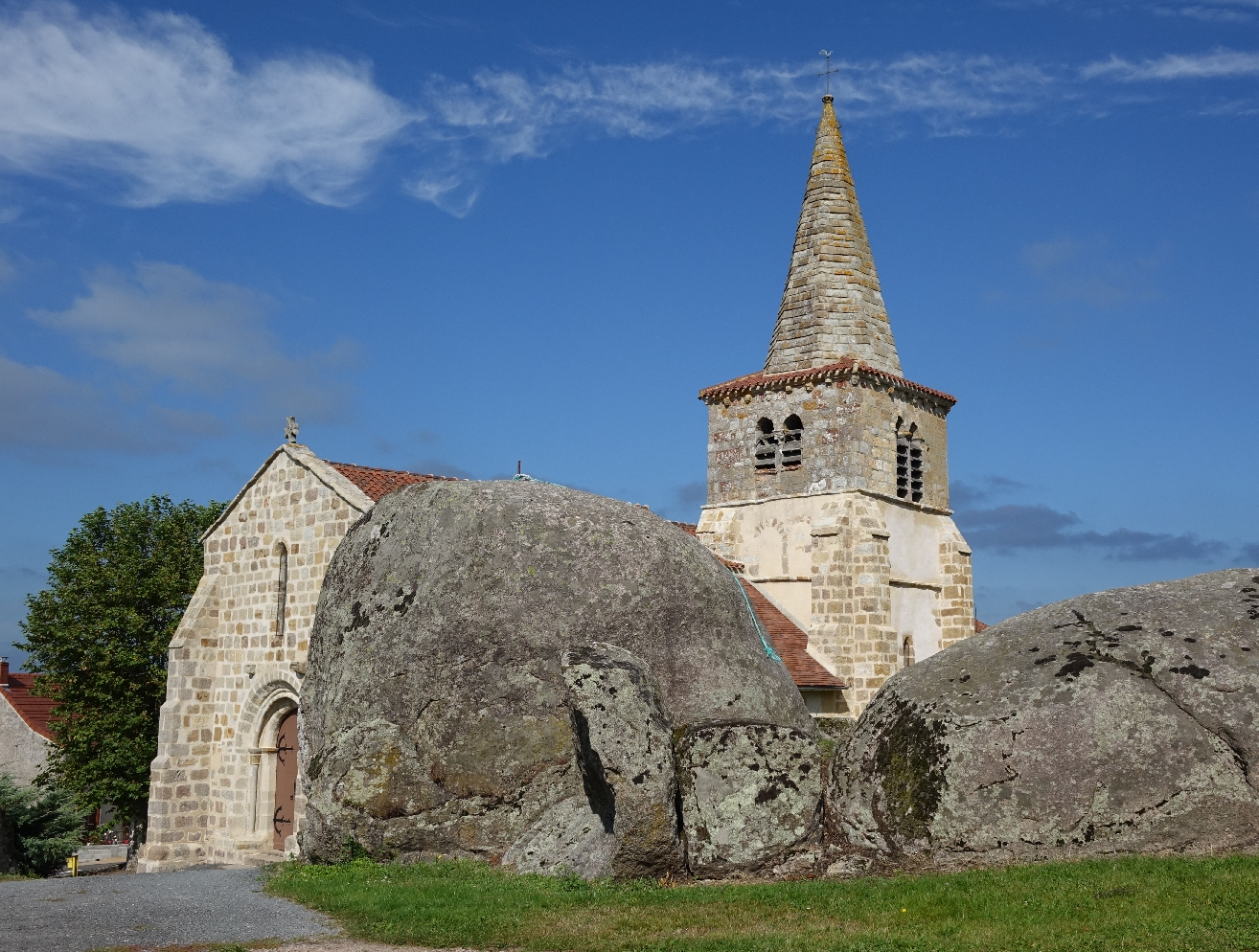
- The church in Louroux-de-Beaune
- Location of Louroux-de-Beaune
- Location within France Location within Auvergne-Rhône-Alpes
- Coordinates: 46°17′36″N 2°51′20″E
- Country: France
- Region: Auvergne-Rhône-Alpes
- Department: Allier
- Arrondissement: Montluçon
- Canton: Commentry
- Intercommunality: Commentry Montmarault Néris Communauté

Government
  - Mayor (2026–32): Maryline Jaligot-Ferrandon
- Area^{1}: 10.66 km^{2} (4.12 sq mi)
- Elevation: 422 m (1,385 ft)
- Highest elevation: 501 m (1,644 ft)
- Lowest elevation: 316 m (1,037 ft)
- Population (2023): 191
  - Density: 17.9/km^{2} (46.4/sq mi)
- Time zone: UTC+01:00 (CET)
  - Summer (DST): UTC+02:00 (CEST)
- INSEE/Postal code: 03151 /03600
- ^{1} French Land Register data, which excludes lakes, ponds, glaciers > 1 km^{2} (0.386 sq mi or 247 acres) and river estuaries.

Louroux-de-Beaune (French pronunciation: [luʁu də bon], literally Louroux of Beaune; Occitan: Lurós de Bauna) is a commune in the Allier department in central France.

== Population ==
Historical population
Year	Pop.	±% p.a.
1968	242	—
1975	194	−3.11%
1982	197	+0.22%
1990	199	+0.13%
1999	186	−0.75%
2007	184	−0.14%
2012	179	−0.55%
2017	165	−1.62%
2023	191	+2.47%
Source: INSEE

== See also ==
- Communes of the Allier department
