= Canton of Montluçon-2 =

Coordinates: 46.34°N 2.61°E

- Canton
- Situation of the canton of Montluçon-2 in the department of Allier
- Country: France
- Region: Auvergne-Rhône-Alpes
- Department: Allier
- No. of communes: {{{nbcomm}}}
- Population (2023): 15,245
- INSEE code: 0310

The canton of Montluçon-2 is an administrative division of the Allier department, in central France. It was created during the French canton reorganisation, which came into effect in March 2015. Its seat is in Montluçon.

It consists of the following communes:

1. Désertines
2. Montluçon (partly)
