= Bézenet =

- Commune
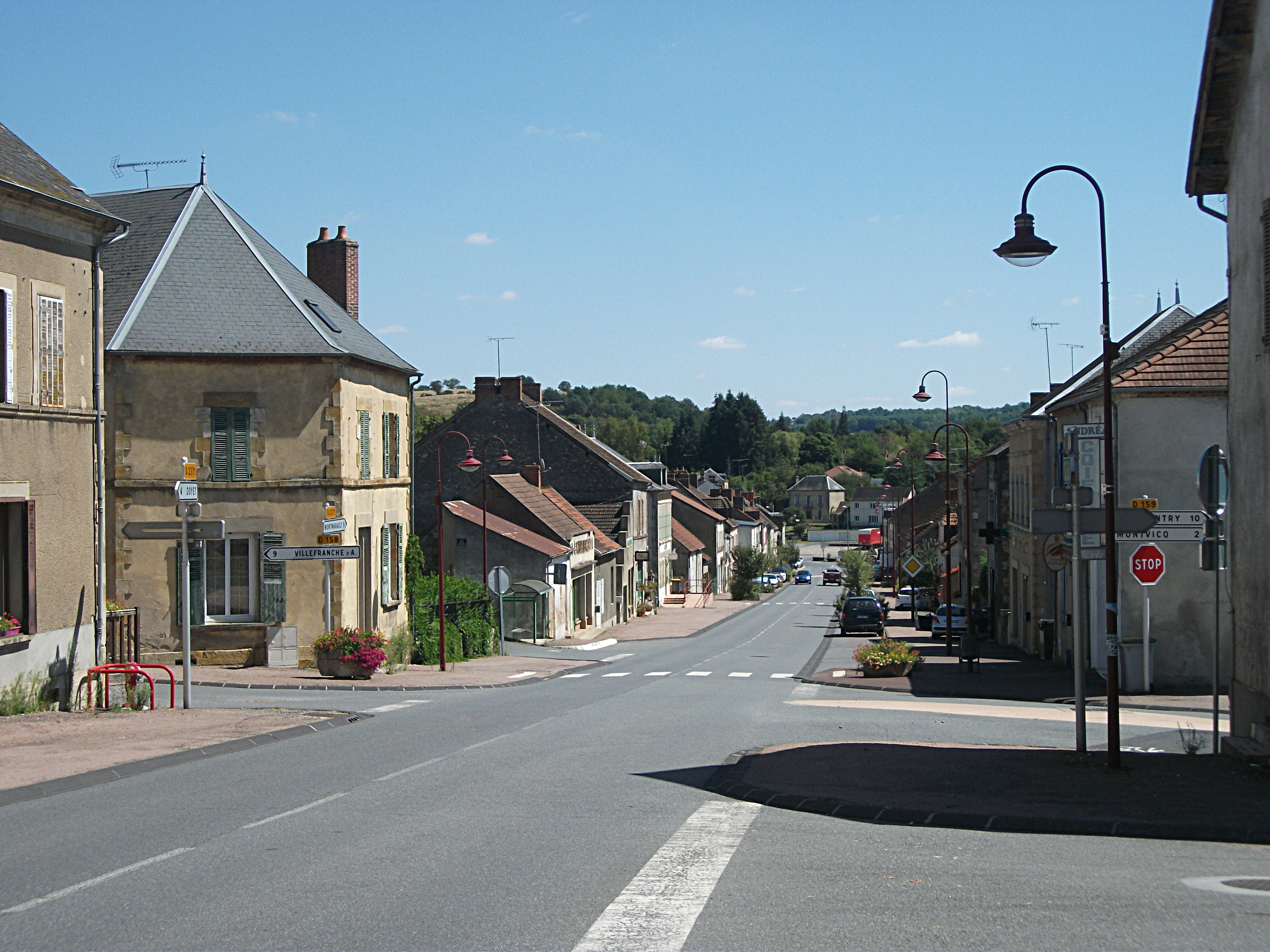
- Road towards Montmarault
- Location of Bézenet
- Location within France Location within Auvergne-Rhône-Alpes
- Coordinates: 46°19′48″N 2°50′45″E
- Country: France
- Region: Auvergne-Rhône-Alpes
- Department: Allier
- Arrondissement: Montluçon
- Canton: Commentry
- Intercommunality: Commentry Montmarault Néris Communauté

Government
  - Mayor (2026–32): Gérard Auberger
- Area^{1}: 9.94 km^{2} (3.84 sq mi)
- Elevation: 342 m (1,122 ft)
- Highest elevation: 376 m (1,234 ft)
- Lowest elevation: 270 m (890 ft)
- Population (2023): 910
  - Density: 92/km^{2} (240/sq mi)
- Time zone: UTC+01:00 (CET)
  - Summer (DST): UTC+02:00 (CEST)
- INSEE/Postal code: 03027 /03170
- ^{1} French Land Register data, which excludes lakes, ponds, glaciers > 1 km^{2} (0.386 sq mi or 247 acres) and river estuaries.

Bézenet (French pronunciation: [beznɛ]; Occitan: Besenet) is a commune in the Allier department in central France.

== Geography ==
Bézenet is part of the canton of Commentry (before March 2015: canton of Montmarault) and of the Commentry Montmarault Néris Communauté.

== Population ==
Historical population
Year	Pop.	±% p.a.
1968	973	—
1975	1,009	+0.52%
1982	1,005	−0.06%
1990	922	−1.07%
1999	953	+0.37%
2007	972	+0.25%
2012	993	+0.43%
2017	948	−0.92%
2023	910	−0.68%
Source: INSEE

== See also ==
- Communes of the Allier department
