= Hyds =

- Commune
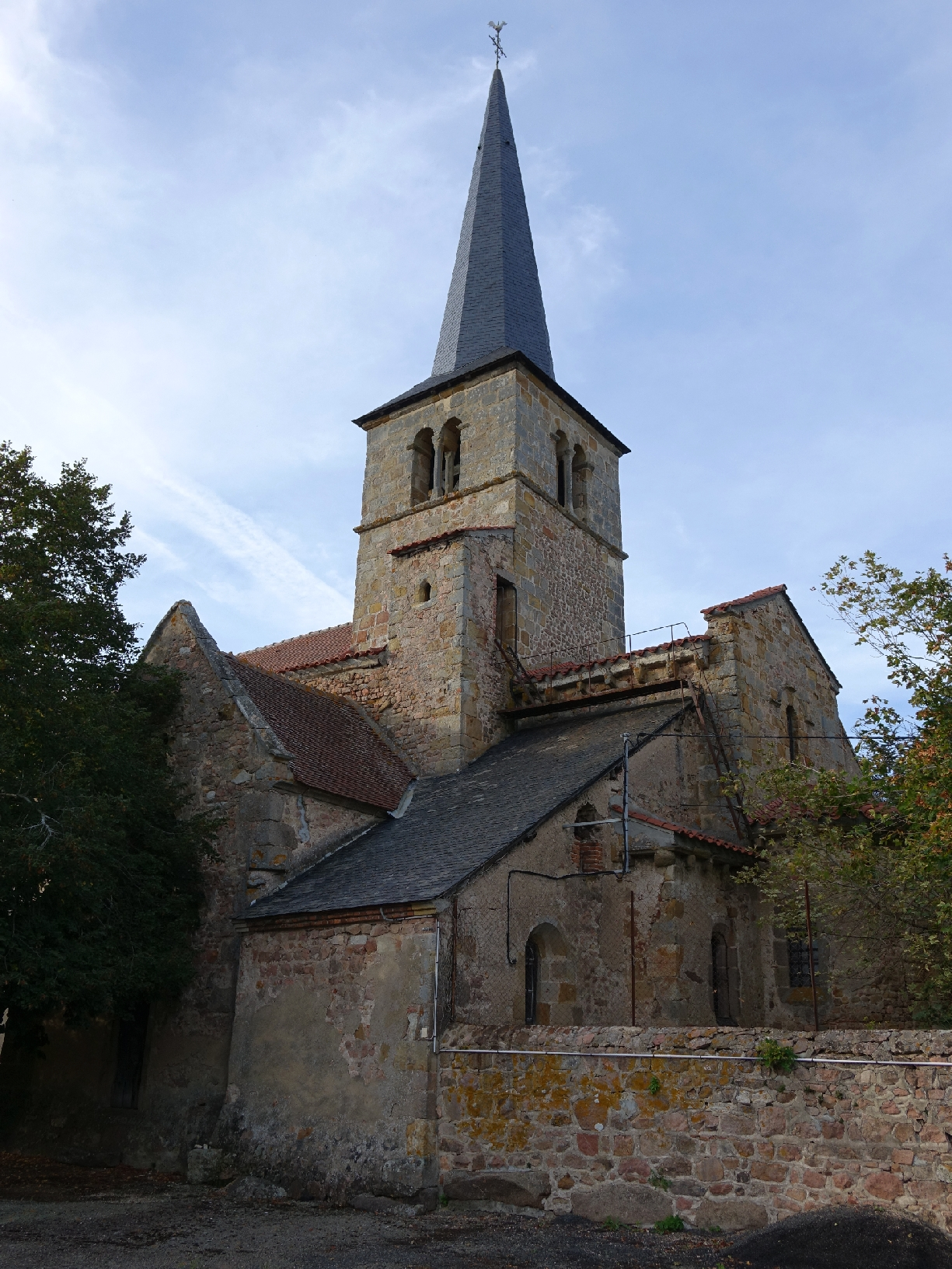
- The church in Hyds

- Coat of arms
- Location of Hyds
- Location within France Location within Auvergne-Rhône-Alpes
- Coordinates: 46°17′08″N 2°49′50″E
- Country: France
- Region: Auvergne-Rhône-Alpes
- Department: Allier
- Arrondissement: Montluçon
- Canton: Commentry

Government
  - Mayor (2026–32): Catherine Champomier
- Area^{1}: 18.71 km^{2} (7.22 sq mi)
- Elevation: 496 m (1,627 ft)
- Highest elevation: 553 m (1,814 ft)
- Lowest elevation: 365 m (1,198 ft)
- Population (2023): 298
  - Density: 15.9/km^{2} (41.3/sq mi)
- Time zone: UTC+01:00 (CET)
  - Summer (DST): UTC+02:00 (CEST)
- INSEE/Postal code: 03129 /03600
- ^{1} French Land Register data, which excludes lakes, ponds, glaciers > 1 km^{2} (0.386 sq mi or 247 acres) and river estuaries.

Hyds is a commune in the Allier department in central France.

== Population ==
Historical population
Year	Pop.	±% p.a.
1968	408	—
1975	337	−2.69%
1982	390	+2.11%
1990	393	+0.10%
1999	359	−1.00%
2007	304	−2.06%
2012	319	+0.97%
2017	320	+0.06%
2023	298	−1.18%
Source: INSEE

== See also ==
- Communes of the Allier department
