= Colombier, Allier =

Colombier
- Commune
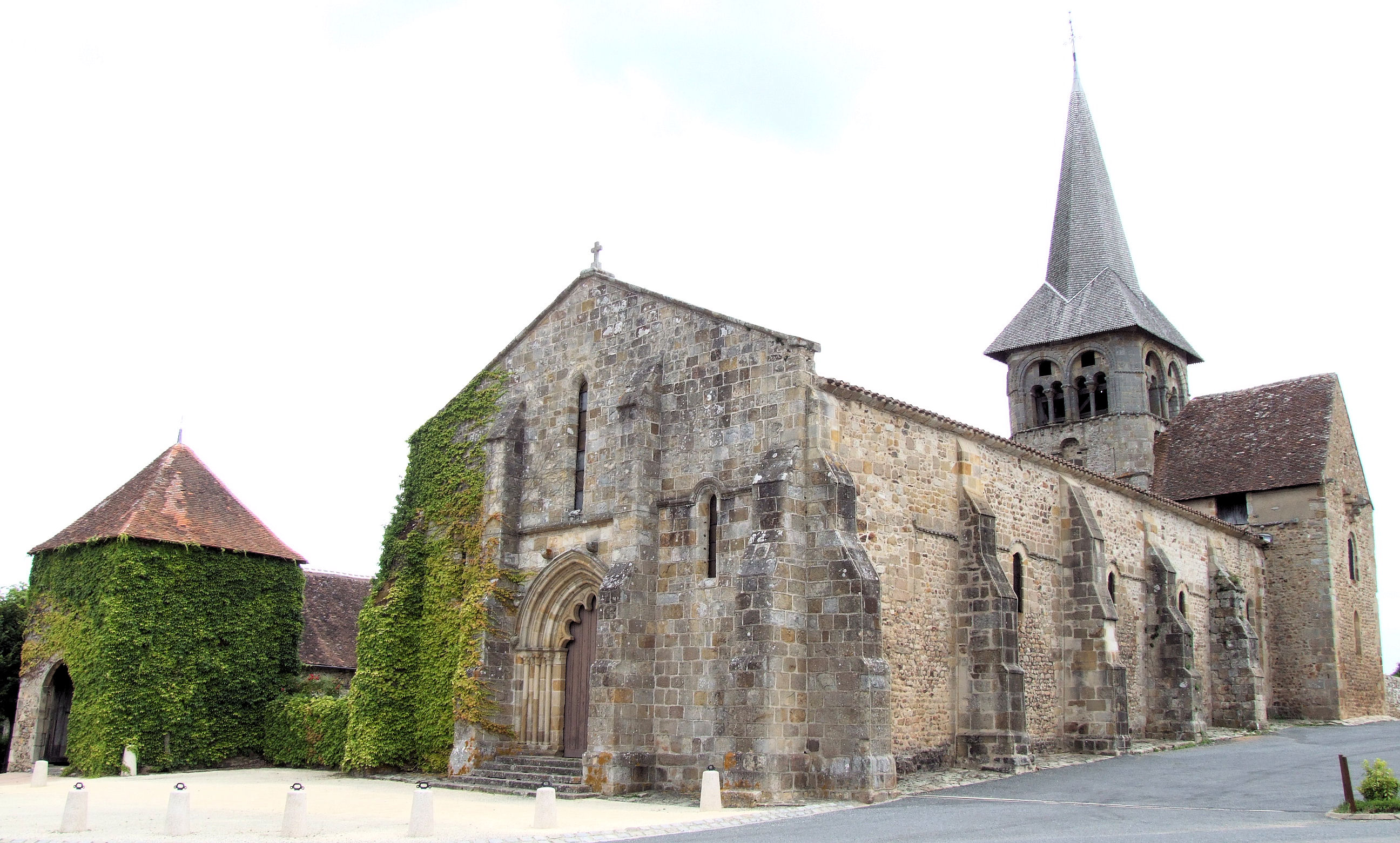
- The church in Colombier
- Location of Colombier
- Location within France Location within Auvergne-Rhône-Alpes
- Coordinates: 46°16′26″N 2°47′41″E
- Country: France
- Region: Auvergne-Rhône-Alpes
- Department: Allier
- Arrondissement: Montluçon
- Canton: Commentry
- Intercommunality: Commentry Montmarault Néris Communauté

Government
  - Mayor (2026–32): Fabrice Valton
- Area^{1}: 12.92 km^{2} (4.99 sq mi)
- Elevation: 416 m (1,365 ft)
- Highest elevation: 519 m (1,703 ft)
- Lowest elevation: 362 m (1,188 ft)
- Population (2023): 327
  - Density: 25.3/km^{2} (65.6/sq mi)
- Time zone: UTC+01:00 (CET)
  - Summer (DST): UTC+02:00 (CEST)
- INSEE/Postal code: 03081 /03600
- ^{1} French Land Register data, which excludes lakes, ponds, glaciers > 1 km^{2} (0.386 sq mi or 247 acres) and river estuaries.

Colombier (French pronunciation: [kɔlɔ̃bje]) is a commune in the Allier department in central France.

== Population ==
Historical population
Year	Pop.	±% p.a.
1968	436	—
1975	361	−2.66%
1982	346	−0.60%
1990	331	−0.55%
1999	312	−0.65%
2007	311	−0.04%
2012	325	+0.88%
2017	332	+0.43%
2023	327	−0.25%
Source: INSEE

== See also ==
- Communes of the Allier department
