= Malicorne, Allier =

Malicorne
- Commune
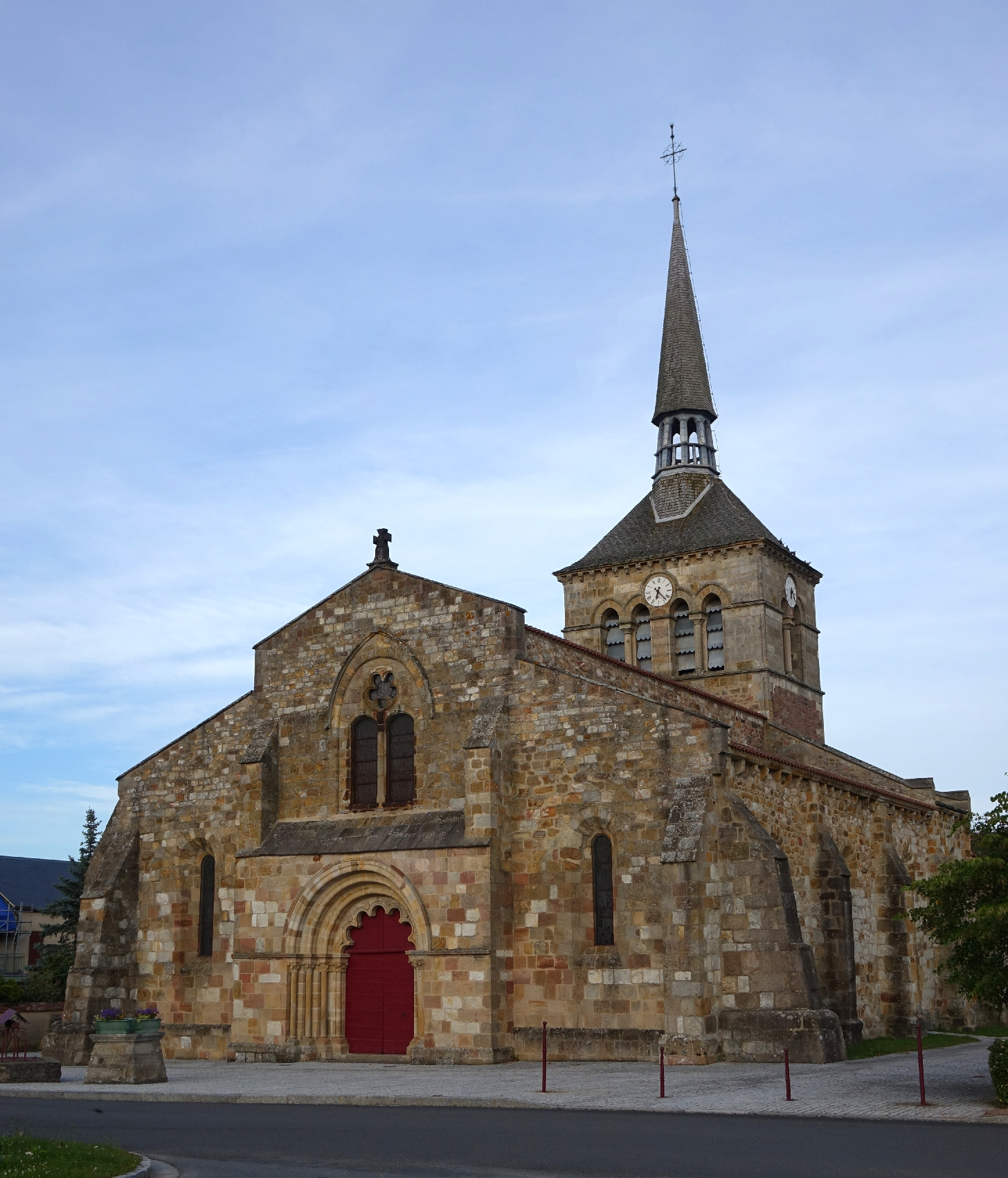
- The church in Malicorne

- Coat of arms
- Location of Malicorne
- Location within France Location within Auvergne-Rhône-Alpes
- Coordinates: 46°18′09″N 2°46′59″E
- Country: France
- Region: Auvergne-Rhône-Alpes
- Department: Allier
- Arrondissement: Montluçon
- Canton: Commentry

Government
  - Mayor (2026–32): Serge Baduel
- Area^{1}: 11.84 km^{2} (4.57 sq mi)
- Elevation: 400 m (1,300 ft)
- Highest elevation: 416 m (1,365 ft)
- Lowest elevation: 309 m (1,014 ft)
- Population (2023): 763
  - Density: 64.4/km^{2} (167/sq mi)
- Time zone: UTC+01:00 (CET)
  - Summer (DST): UTC+02:00 (CEST)
- INSEE/Postal code: 03159 /03600
- ^{1} French Land Register data, which excludes lakes, ponds, glaciers > 1 km^{2} (0.386 sq mi or 247 acres) and river estuaries.

Malicorne (French pronunciation: [malikɔʁn]; Occitan: Malicòrna) is a commune in the Allier department in central France.

== Population ==
Historical population
| Year | Pop. | ±% p.a. |
|---|---|---|
| 1968 | 485 | — |
| 1975 | 528 | +1.22% |
| 1982 | 524 | −0.11% |
| 1990 | 822 | +5.79% |
| 1999 | 814 | −0.11% |
| 2007 | 857 | +0.65% |
| 2012 | 829 | −0.66% |
| 2017 | 796 | −0.81% |
| 2023 | 763 | −0.70% |
Source: INSEE

== See also ==
- Communes of the Allier department
