= Désertines, Allier =

Désertines
- Commune
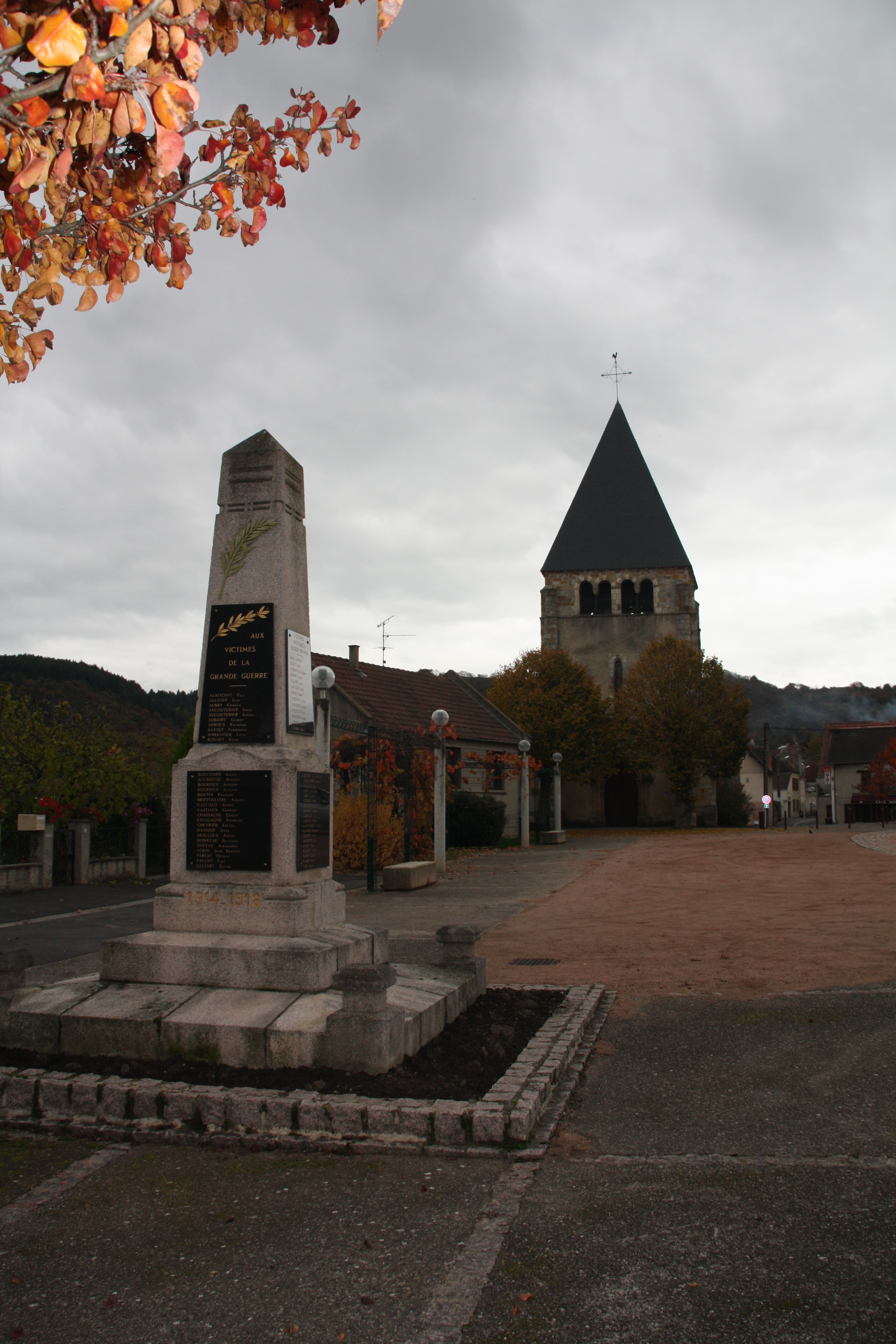
- The church in Désertines
- Location of Désertines
- Location within France Location within Auvergne-Rhône-Alpes
- Coordinates: 46°21′N 2°37′E
- Country: France
- Region: Auvergne-Rhône-Alpes
- Department: Allier
- Arrondissement: Montluçon
- Canton: Montluçon-2
- Intercommunality: CA Montluçon Communauté

Government
  - Mayor (2026–32): Jonathan Da Silva
- Area^{1}: 8.34 km^{2} (3.22 sq mi)
- Elevation: 216 m (709 ft)
- Highest elevation: 384 m (1,260 ft)
- Lowest elevation: 193 m (633 ft)
- Population (2023): 4,259
  - Density: 511/km^{2} (1,320/sq mi)
- Time zone: UTC+01:00 (CET)
  - Summer (DST): UTC+02:00 (CEST)
- INSEE/Postal code: 03098 /03630
- ^{1} French Land Register data, which excludes lakes, ponds, glaciers > 1 km^{2} (0.386 sq mi or 247 acres) and river estuaries.

Désertines (French pronunciation: [dezɛʁtin]; Occitan: Desertinas) is a commune in the Allier department in central France.

== Population ==
Historical population

Year	Pop.	±% p.a.
1793	1,000	—
1800	1,022	+0.31%
1806	1,035	+0.21%
1821	1,145	+0.68%
1831	1,137	−0.07%
1836	1,196	+1.02%
1841	1,161	−0.59%
1846	1,351	+3.08%
1851	1,413	+0.90%
1856	1,649	+3.14%
1861	1,591	−0.71%
1866	1,777	+2.24%
1872	1,967	+1.71%
1876	2,020	+0.67%
1881	2,350	+3.07%
1886	2,320	−0.26%
1891	2,350	+0.26%
1896	2,592	+1.98%
1901	3,000	+2.97%

Year	Pop.	±% p.a.
1906	3,080	+0.53%
1911	2,960	−0.79%
1921	2,923	−0.13%
1926	2,892	−0.21%
1931	3,217	+2.15%
1936	3,236	+0.12%
1946	3,729	+1.43%
1954	3,997	+0.87%
1962	4,331	+1.01%
1968	4,697	+1.36%
1975	4,593	−0.32%
1982	4,912	+0.96%
1990	4,961	+0.12%
1999	4,646	−0.73%
2007	4,465	−0.50%
2012	4,232	−1.07%
2017	4,422	+0.88%
2023	4,259	−0.62%

Source: EHESS and INSEE (1968-2023)

== See also ==
- Communes of the Allier department
