= Saint-Angel, Allier =

Saint-Angel
- Commune
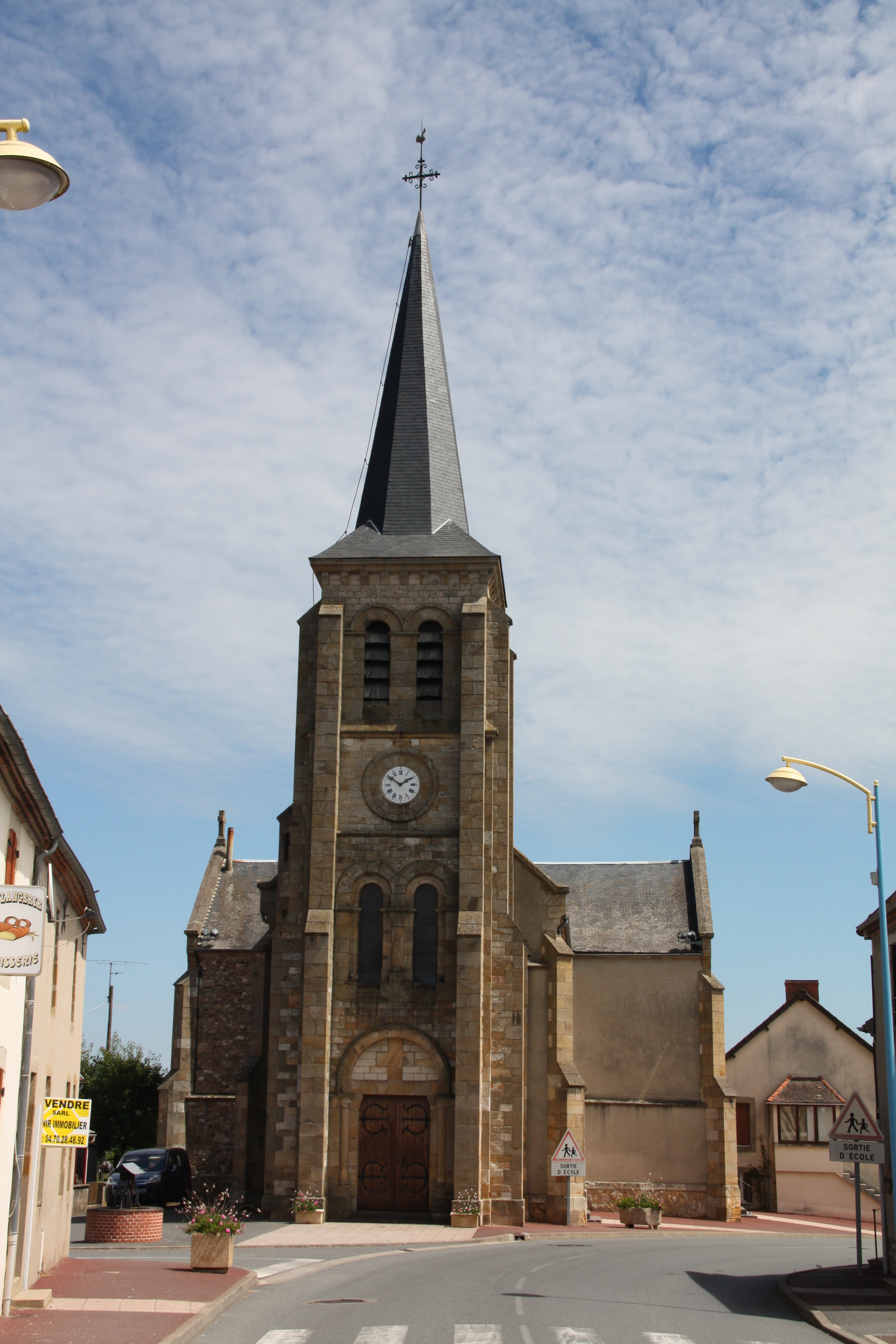
- The church in Saint-Angel
- Location of Saint-Angel
- Location within France Location within Auvergne-Rhône-Alpes
- Coordinates: 46°21′30″N 2°41′54″E
- Country: France
- Region: Auvergne-Rhône-Alpes
- Department: Allier
- Arrondissement: Montluçon
- Canton: Commentry
- Intercommunality: Commentry Montmarault Néris Communauté

Government
  - Mayor (2026–32): Guy Fabre
- Area^{1}: 25.27 km^{2} (9.76 sq mi)
- Elevation: 360 m (1,180 ft)
- Highest elevation: 406 m (1,332 ft)
- Lowest elevation: 242 m (794 ft)
- Population (2023): 738
  - Density: 29.2/km^{2} (75.6/sq mi)
- Time zone: UTC+01:00 (CET)
  - Summer (DST): UTC+02:00 (CEST)
- INSEE/Postal code: 03217 /03170
- ^{1} French Land Register data, which excludes lakes, ponds, glaciers > 1 km^{2} (0.386 sq mi or 247 acres) and river estuaries.

Saint-Angel (French pronunciation: [sɛ̃.t‿ɑ̃ʒɛl]; Occitan: Sant Àngel) is a commune in the Allier department in Auvergne-Rhône-Alpes in central France.

== Population ==
Historical population
Year	Pop.	±% p.a.
1968	451	—
1975	401	−1.66%
1982	548	+4.56%
1990	629	+1.74%
1999	685	+0.95%
2007	728	+0.76%
2012	754	+0.70%
2017	754	+0.00%
2023	738	−0.36%
Source: INSEE

== See also ==
- Communes of the Allier department
