= Verneix =

- Commune
- Location of Verneix
- Location within France Location within Auvergne-Rhône-Alpes
- Coordinates: 46°23′52″N 2°40′15″E
- Country: France
- Region: Auvergne-Rhône-Alpes
- Department: Allier
- Arrondissement: Montluçon
- Canton: Commentry
- Intercommunality: Commentry Montmarault Néris Communauté

Government
  - Mayor (2026–32): Lionel Brocard
- Area^{1}: 30.87 km^{2} (11.92 sq mi)
- Elevation: 360 m (1,180 ft)
- Highest elevation: 387 m (1,270 ft)
- Lowest elevation: 230 m (750 ft)
- Population (2023): 574
  - Density: 18.6/km^{2} (48.2/sq mi)
- Time zone: UTC+01:00 (CET)
  - Summer (DST): UTC+02:00 (CEST)
- INSEE/Postal code: 03305 /03190
- ^{1} French Land Register data, which excludes lakes, ponds, glaciers > 1 km^{2} (0.386 sq mi or 247 acres) and river estuaries.

Verneix (French pronunciation: [vɛʁnɛ]; Occitan: Vernai) is a commune in the Allier department in Auvergne-Rhône-Alpes in central France.

== Population ==
Historical population
Year	Pop.	±% p.a.
1968	619	—
1975	556	−1.52%
1982	538	−0.47%
1990	574	+0.81%
1999	584	+0.19%
2007	553	−0.68%
2012	618	+2.25%
2017	603	−0.49%
2023	574	−0.82%
Source: INSEE

== Sights ==
- Saint Laurent church from the 19th century.

== Personalities ==
- Théophile Alajouanine, (1890–1980), neurologist and writer, born in Verneix

== See also ==
- Communes of the Allier department
