= Vernusse =

- Commune
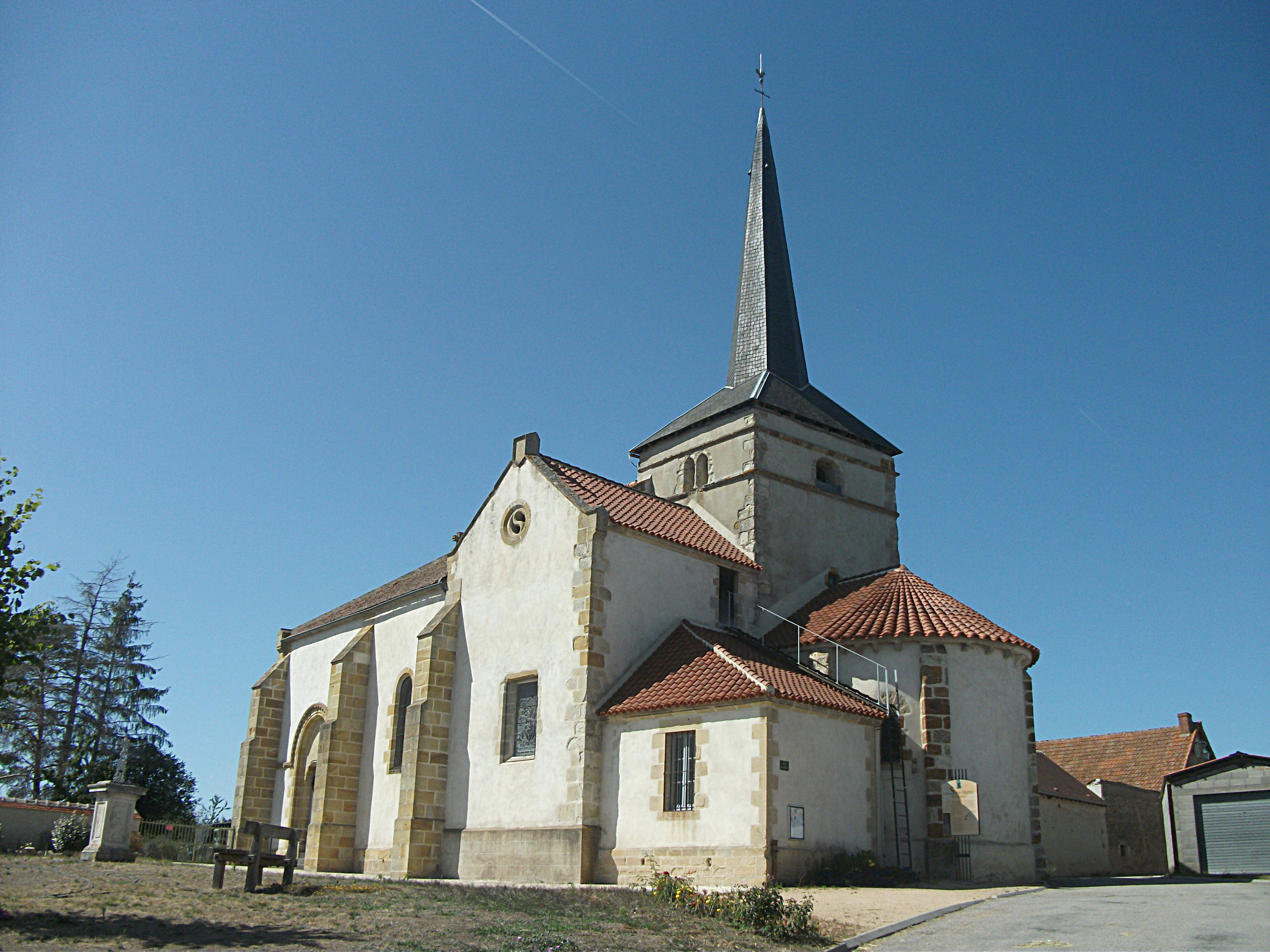
- Church Saint-Martin

- Coat of arms
- Location of Vernusse
- Location within France Location within Auvergne-Rhône-Alpes
- Coordinates: 46°16′10″N 2°58′43″E
- Country: France
- Region: Auvergne-Rhône-Alpes
- Department: Allier
- Arrondissement: Montluçon
- Canton: Commentry
- Intercommunality: Commentry Montmarault Néris Communauté

Government
  - Mayor (2026–32): François Le Moucheux
- Area^{1}: 19.55 km^{2} (7.55 sq mi)
- Elevation: 363 m (1,191 ft)
- Highest elevation: 465 m (1,526 ft)
- Lowest elevation: 332 m (1,089 ft)
- Population (2023): 149
  - Density: 7.62/km^{2} (19.7/sq mi)
- Time zone: UTC+01:00 (CET)
  - Summer (DST): UTC+02:00 (CEST)
- INSEE/Postal code: 03308 /03390
- ^{1} French Land Register data, which excludes lakes, ponds, glaciers > 1 km^{2} (0.386 sq mi or 247 acres) and river estuaries.

Vernusse (French pronunciation: [vɛʁnys]; Occitan: Vernusa) is a commune in the Allier department in Auvergne-Rhône-Alpes in central France.

== Geography ==
The river Bouble forms all of the commune's southeastern border.

== Population ==
Historical population
Year	Pop.	±% p.a.
1968	231	—
1975	195	−2.39%
1982	191	−0.30%
1990	145	−3.39%
1999	193	+3.23%
2007	157	−2.55%
2012	169	+1.48%
2017	153	−1.97%
2023	149	−0.44%
Source: INSEE

== See also ==
- Communes of the Allier department
