= Saint-Bonnet-de-Four =

- Commune
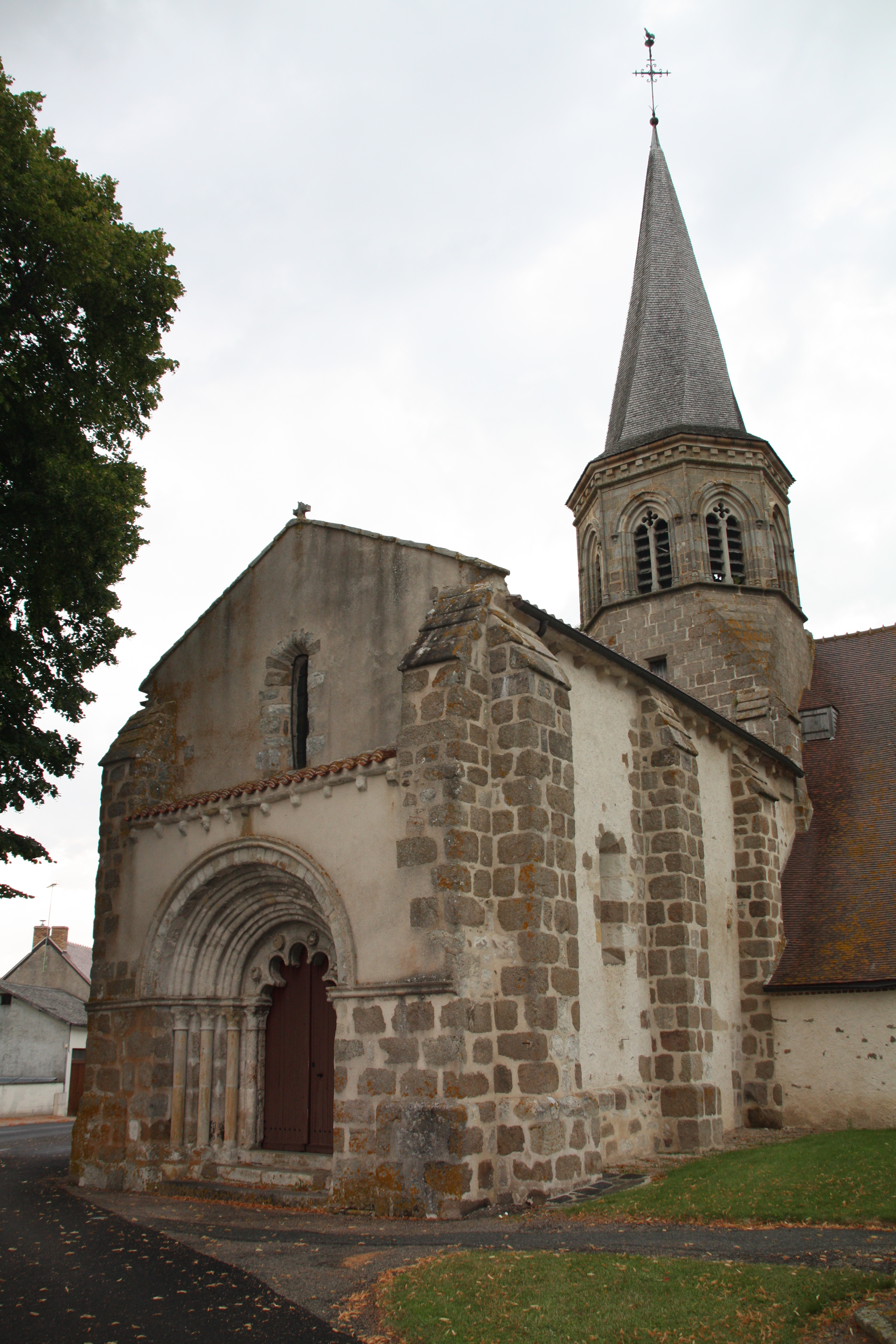
- The church in Saint-Bonnet-de-Four
- Location of Saint-Bonnet-de-Four
- Location within France Location within Auvergne-Rhône-Alpes
- Coordinates: 46°18′49″N 2°54′40″E
- Country: France
- Region: Auvergne-Rhône-Alpes
- Department: Allier
- Arrondissement: Montluçon
- Canton: Commentry
- Intercommunality: Commentry Montmarault Néris Communauté

Government
  - Mayor (2026–32): Daniel Beaulaton
- Area^{1}: 18.73 km^{2} (7.23 sq mi)
- Elevation: 467 m (1,532 ft)
- Highest elevation: 476 m (1,562 ft)
- Lowest elevation: 318 m (1,043 ft)
- Population (2023): 227
  - Density: 12.1/km^{2} (31.4/sq mi)
- Time zone: UTC+01:00 (CET)
  - Summer (DST): UTC+02:00 (CEST)
- INSEE/Postal code: 03219 /03390
- ^{1} French Land Register data, which excludes lakes, ponds, glaciers > 1 km^{2} (0.386 sq mi or 247 acres) and river estuaries.

Saint-Bonnet-de-Four (French pronunciation: [sɛ̃ bɔnɛ də fuʁ]; Occitan: Sant Bonet de Forn) is a commune in the Allier department in Auvergne-Rhône-Alpes in central France.

== Population ==
Historical population
Year	Pop.	±% p.a.
1968	299	—
1975	259	−2.03%
1982	228	−1.80%
1990	227	−0.05%
1999	221	−0.30%
2007	195	−1.55%
2012	209	+1.40%
2017	212	+0.29%
2023	227	+1.15%
Source: INSEE

== Sights ==
- Church of Saint Bonnet, with its bent steeple and ornate doors.

The original church dates from the 11th century and is a designated historic monument. In the 14th century, a Gothic chapel was added on the right of the transept.

The steeple was struck by lightning in 1894 and rebuilt from green wood that subsequently warped and became a local curiosity. In 1978, when the church was restored, the requirement that it be rebuilt exactly like the original meant that the 1/8 turn in the steeple had to be maintained.

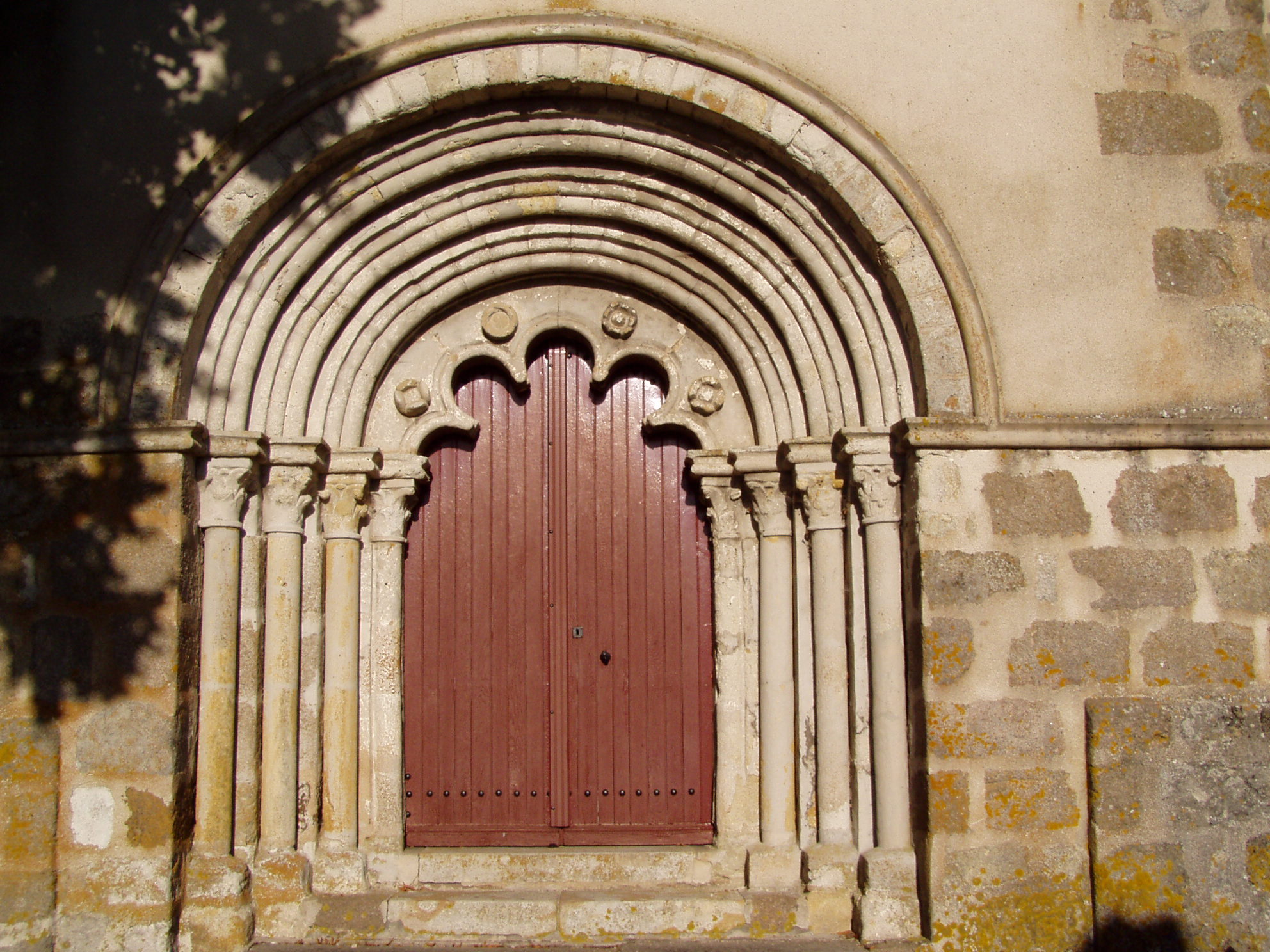
Door of the church

== See also ==
- Communes of the Allier department
