= Deneuille-les-Mines =

- Commune
- Location of Deneuille-les-Mines
- Location within France Location within Auvergne-Rhône-Alpes
- Coordinates: 46°22′46″N 2°46′59″E
- Country: France
- Region: Auvergne-Rhône-Alpes
- Department: Allier
- Arrondissement: Montluçon
- Canton: Commentry
- Intercommunality: Commentry Montmarault Néris Communauté

Government
  - Mayor (2026–32): François Dumont
- Area^{1}: 24.88 km^{2} (9.61 sq mi)
- Elevation: 260 m (850 ft)
- Highest elevation: 390 m (1,280 ft)
- Lowest elevation: 244 m (801 ft)
- Population (2023): 347
  - Density: 13.9/km^{2} (36.1/sq mi)
- Time zone: UTC+01:00 (CET)
  - Summer (DST): UTC+02:00 (CEST)
- INSEE/Postal code: 03097 /03170
- ^{1} French Land Register data, which excludes lakes, ponds, glaciers > 1 km^{2} (0.386 sq mi or 247 acres) and river estuaries.

Deneuille-les-Mines (French pronunciation: [dənœj le min]; Occitan: Denuelha de las Minas) is a commune in the Allier department in central France.

== Population ==
Historical population
| Year | Pop. | ±% p.a. |
|---|---|---|
| 1968 | 423 | — |
| 1975 | 354 | −2.51% |
| 1982 | 347 | −0.28% |
| 1990 | 338 | −0.33% |
| 1999 | 351 | +0.42% |
| 2007 | 340 | −0.40% |
| 2012 | 353 | +0.75% |
| 2017 | 362 | +0.50% |
| 2023 | 347 | −0.70% |
Source: INSEE

== See also ==
- Communes of the Allier department
