= Murat, Allier =

Murat
- Commune
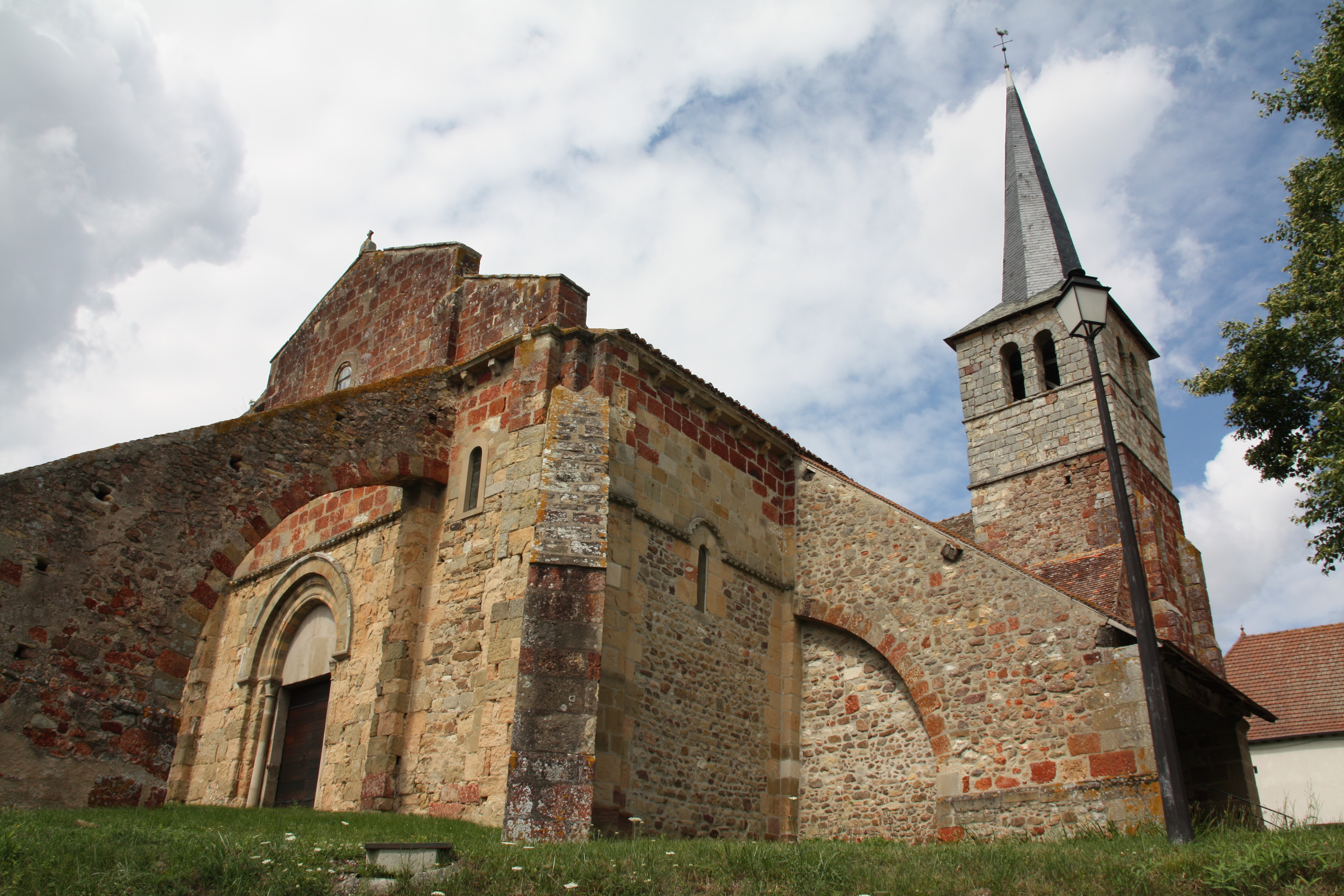
- The church in Murat
- Location of Murat
- Location within France Location within Auvergne-Rhône-Alpes
- Coordinates: 46°24′12″N 2°54′42″E
- Country: France
- Region: Auvergne-Rhône-Alpes
- Department: Allier
- Arrondissement: Montluçon
- Canton: Commentry

Government
  - Mayor (2026–32): Patrick Montjoie
- Area^{1}: 20.07 km^{2} (7.75 sq mi)
- Elevation: 314 m (1,030 ft)
- Highest elevation: 360 m (1,180 ft)
- Lowest elevation: 247 m (810 ft)
- Population (2023): 264
  - Density: 13.2/km^{2} (34.1/sq mi)
- Time zone: UTC+01:00 (CET)
  - Summer (DST): UTC+02:00 (CEST)
- INSEE/Postal code: 03191 /03390
- ^{1} French Land Register data, which excludes lakes, ponds, glaciers > 1 km^{2} (0.386 sq mi or 247 acres) and river estuaries.

Murat (French pronunciation: [myʁa]) is a commune in the Allier department in central France.

== Population ==
Historical population
Year	Pop.	±% p.a.
1968	409	—
1975	334	−2.85%
1982	295	−1.76%
1990	301	+0.25%
1999	311	+0.36%
2007	274	−1.57%
2012	288	+1.00%
2017	295	+0.48%
2023	264	−1.83%
Source: INSEE

== See also ==
- Communes of the Allier department
