= Saint-Priest-en-Murat =

- Commune
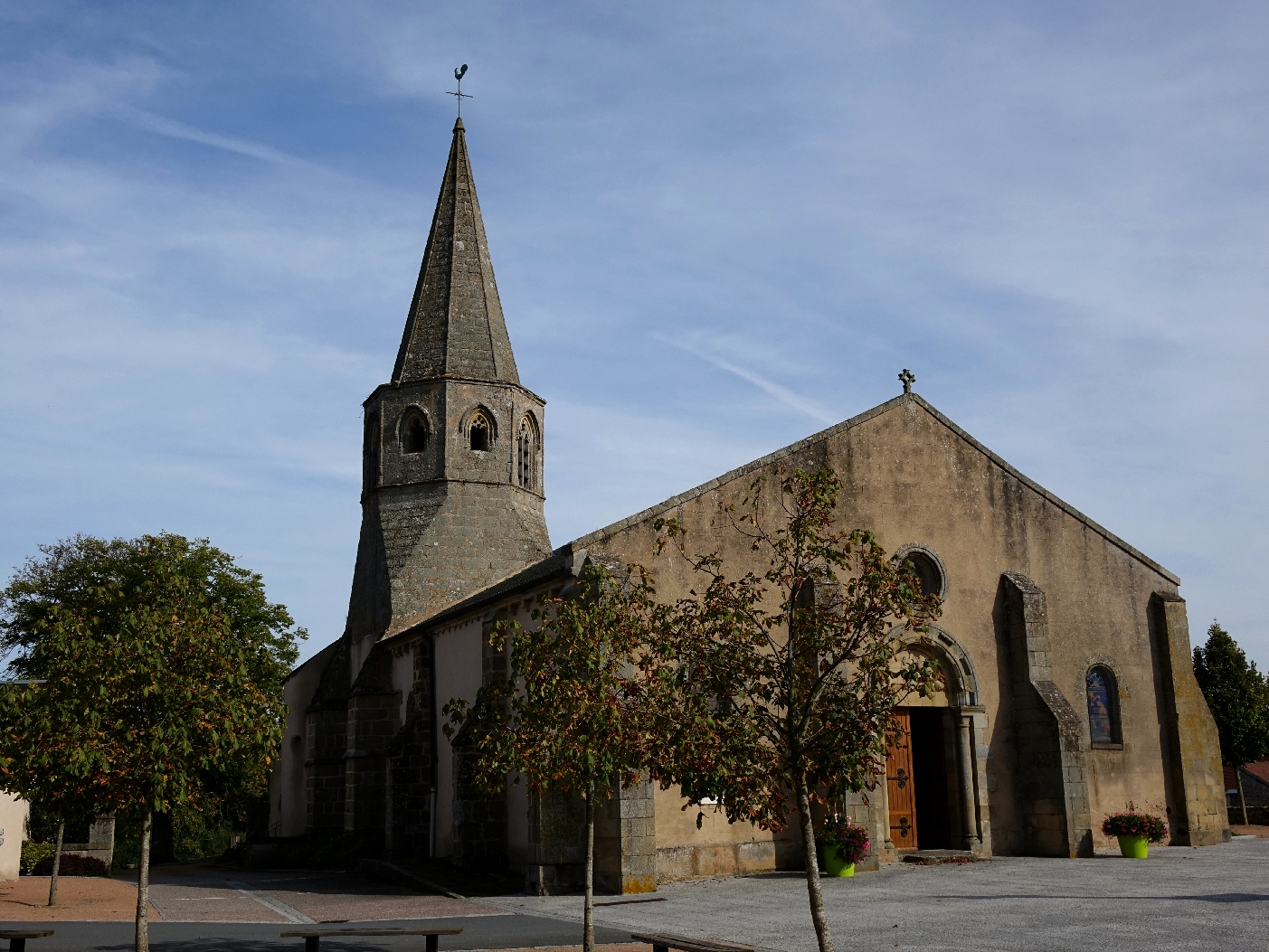
- The church in Saint-Priest-en-Murat
- Location of Saint-Priest-en-Murat
- Location within France Location within Auvergne-Rhône-Alpes
- Coordinates: 46°21′00″N 2°54′47″E
- Country: France
- Region: Auvergne-Rhône-Alpes
- Department: Allier
- Arrondissement: Montluçon
- Canton: Commentry
- Intercommunality: Commentry Montmarault Néris Communauté

Government
  - Mayor (2026–32): Benoît Thevenet
- Area^{1}: 25.48 km^{2} (9.84 sq mi)
- Elevation: 387 m (1,270 ft)
- Highest elevation: 433 m (1,421 ft)
- Lowest elevation: 265 m (869 ft)
- Population (2023): 214
  - Density: 8.40/km^{2} (21.8/sq mi)
- Time zone: UTC+01:00 (CET)
  - Summer (DST): UTC+02:00 (CEST)
- INSEE/Postal code: 03256 /03390
- ^{1} French Land Register data, which excludes lakes, ponds, glaciers > 1 km^{2} (0.386 sq mi or 247 acres) and river estuaries.

Saint-Priest-en-Murat (French pronunciation: [sɑ̃ pʁijɛ(st) ɑ̃ myʁa]) is a commune in the Allier department in Auvergne-Rhône-Alpes in central France.

== Population ==
Historical population
Year	Pop.	±% p.a.
1968	413	—
1975	321	−3.54%
1982	268	−2.54%
1990	243	−1.22%
1999	231	−0.56%
2007	254	+1.19%
2012	204	−4.29%
2017	223	+1.80%
2023	214	−0.68%
Source: INSEE

== See also ==
- Communes of the Allier department
