= Blomard =

- Commune
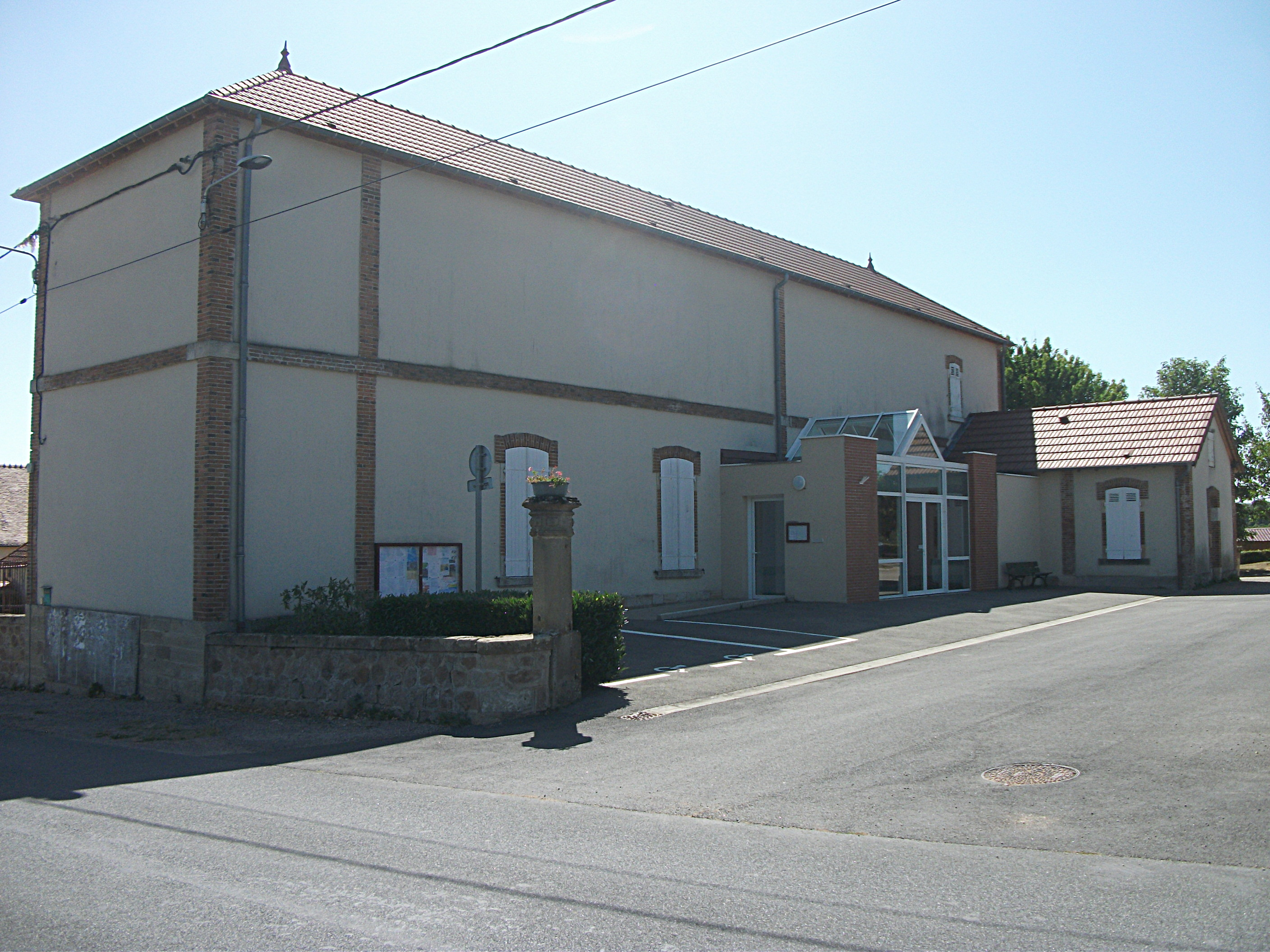
- Town hall
- Location of Blomard
- Location within France Location within Auvergne-Rhône-Alpes
- Coordinates: 46°17′25″N 2°58′41″E
- Country: France
- Region: Auvergne-Rhône-Alpes
- Department: Allier
- Arrondissement: Montluçon
- Canton: Commentry
- Intercommunality: Commentry Montmarault Néris Communauté

Government
  - Mayor (2026–32): Aurelien Brossard
- Area^{1}: 22.37 km^{2} (8.64 sq mi)
- Elevation: 440 m (1,440 ft)
- Highest elevation: 487 m (1,598 ft)
- Lowest elevation: 343 m (1,125 ft)
- Population (2023): 222
  - Density: 9.92/km^{2} (25.7/sq mi)
- Time zone: UTC+01:00 (CET)
  - Summer (DST): UTC+02:00 (CEST)
- INSEE/Postal code: 03032 /03390
- ^{1} French Land Register data, which excludes lakes, ponds, glaciers > 1 km^{2} (0.386 sq mi or 247 acres) and river estuaries.

Blomard (French pronunciation: [blɔmaʁ]; Occitan: Blomart) is a commune in the Allier department in central France.

== Population ==
Historical population
Year	Pop.	±% p.a.
1968	267	—
1975	228	−2.23%
1982	192	−2.43%
1990	228	+2.17%
1999	205	−1.17%
2007	204	−0.06%
2012	215	+1.06%
2017	247	+2.81%
2023	222	−1.76%
Source: INSEE

== See also ==
- Communes of the Allier department
