= Saint-Marcel-en-Murat =

- Commune
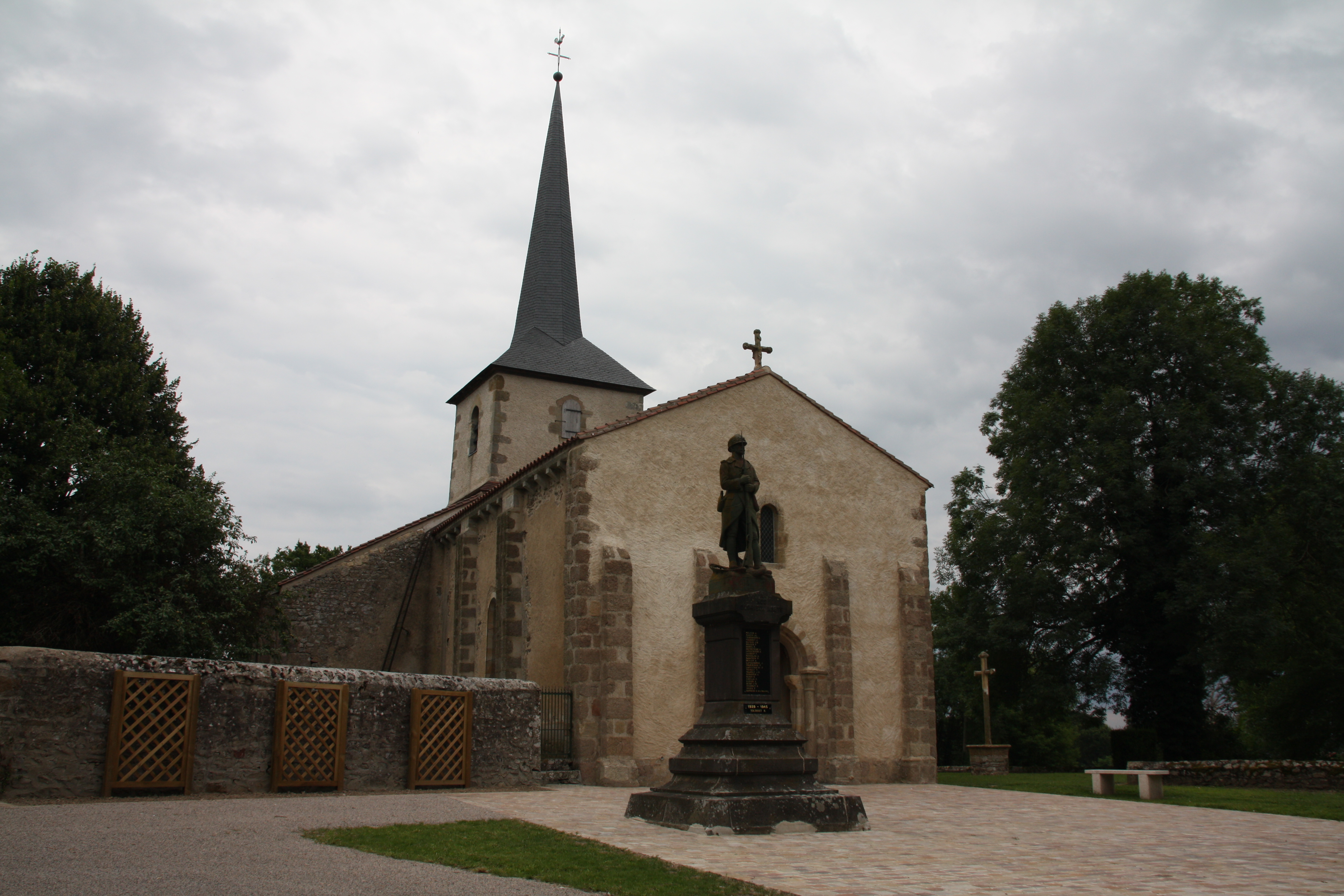
- The church in Saint-Marcel-en-Murat
- Location of Saint-Marcel-en-Murat
- Location within France Location within Auvergne-Rhône-Alpes
- Coordinates: 46°19′18″N 3°00′33″E
- Country: France
- Region: Auvergne-Rhône-Alpes
- Department: Allier
- Arrondissement: Montluçon
- Canton: Commentry
- Intercommunality: Commentry Montmarault Néris Communauté

Government
  - Mayor (2026–32): Roger Chevalier
- Area^{1}: 16.82 km^{2} (6.49 sq mi)
- Highest elevation: 484 m (1,588 ft)
- Lowest elevation: 356 m (1,168 ft)
- Population (2023): 128
  - Density: 7.61/km^{2} (19.7/sq mi)
- Time zone: UTC+01:00 (CET)
  - Summer (DST): UTC+02:00 (CEST)
- INSEE/Postal code: 03243 /03390
- ^{1} French Land Register data, which excludes lakes, ponds, glaciers > 1 km^{2} (0.386 sq mi or 247 acres) and river estuaries.

Saint-Marcel-en-Murat is a commune in the Allier department in Auvergne-Rhône-Alpes in central France.

== Population ==
Historical population
Year	Pop.	±% p.a.
1968	237	—
1975	188	−3.25%
1982	157	−2.54%
1990	179	+1.65%
1999	157	−1.45%
2007	134	−1.96%
2012	140	+0.88%
2017	124	−2.40%
2023	128	+0.53%
Source: INSEE

== See also ==
- Communes of the Allier department
