= Chamblet =

- Commune
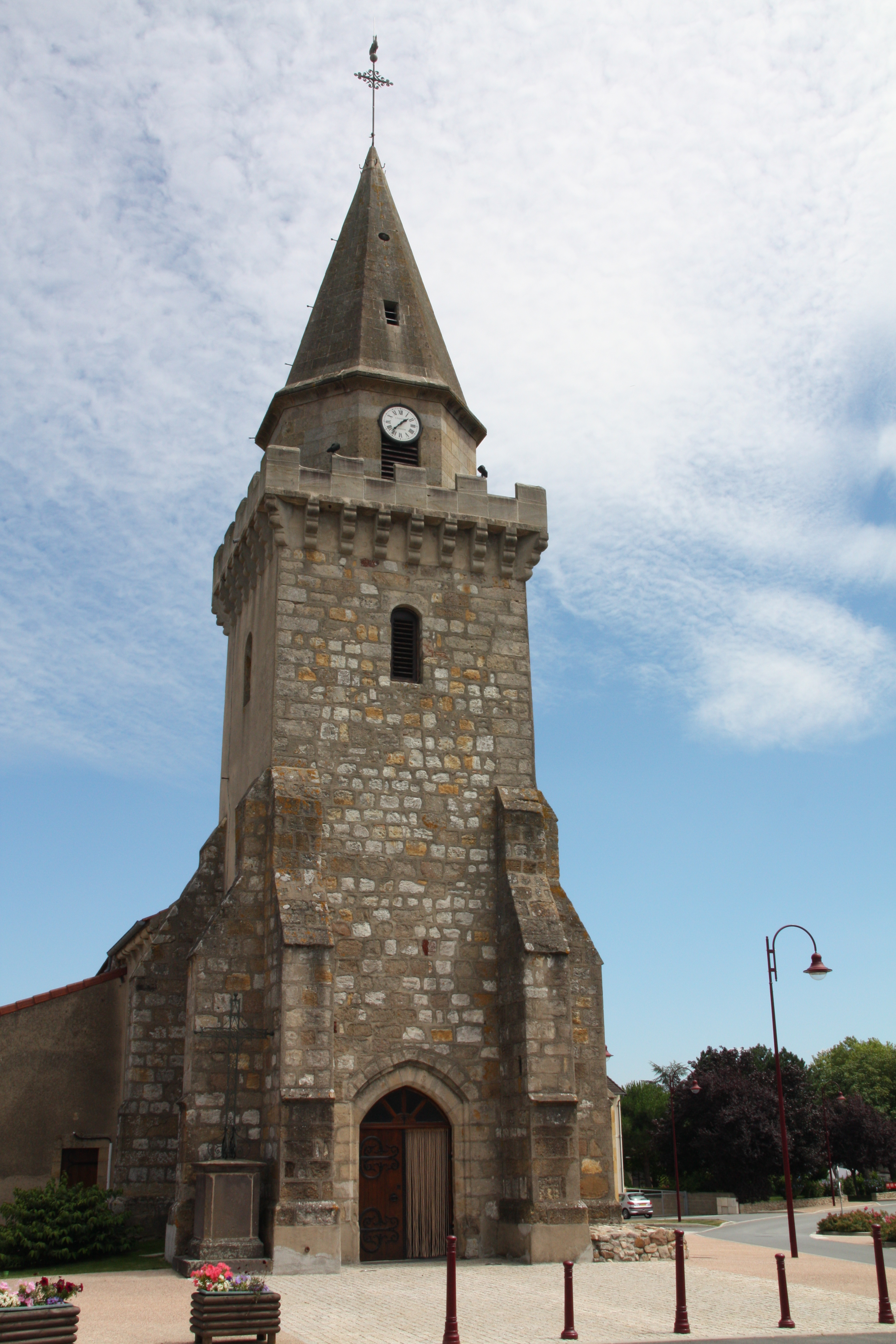
- The church in Chamblet
- Location of Chamblet
- Location within France Location within Auvergne-Rhône-Alpes
- Coordinates: 46°20′01″N 2°42′11″E
- Country: France
- Region: Auvergne-Rhône-Alpes
- Department: Allier
- Arrondissement: Montluçon
- Canton: Commentry
- Intercommunality: Commentry Montmarault Néris Communauté

Government
  - Mayor (2026–32): Michèle Duffault
- Area^{1}: 20.5 km^{2} (7.9 sq mi)
- Elevation: 350 m (1,150 ft)
- Highest elevation: 393 m (1,289 ft)
- Lowest elevation: 279 m (915 ft)
- Population (2023): 1,074
  - Density: 52.4/km^{2} (136/sq mi)
- Time zone: UTC+01:00 (CET)
  - Summer (DST): UTC+02:00 (CEST)
- INSEE/Postal code: 03052 /03170
- ^{1} French Land Register data, which excludes lakes, ponds, glaciers > 1 km^{2} (0.386 sq mi or 247 acres) and river estuaries.

Chamblet (French pronunciation: [ʃɑ̃blɛ]) is a commune in the Allier department in central France.

== Population ==
Historical population
Year	Pop.	±% p.a.
1968	855	—
1975	807	−0.82%
1982	932	+2.08%
1990	1,046	+1.45%
1999	941	−1.17%
2007	1,064	+1.55%
2012	1,090	+0.48%
2017	1,097	+0.13%
2023	1,074	−0.35%
Source: INSEE

== See also ==
- Communes of the Allier department
