= Montvicq =

- Commune
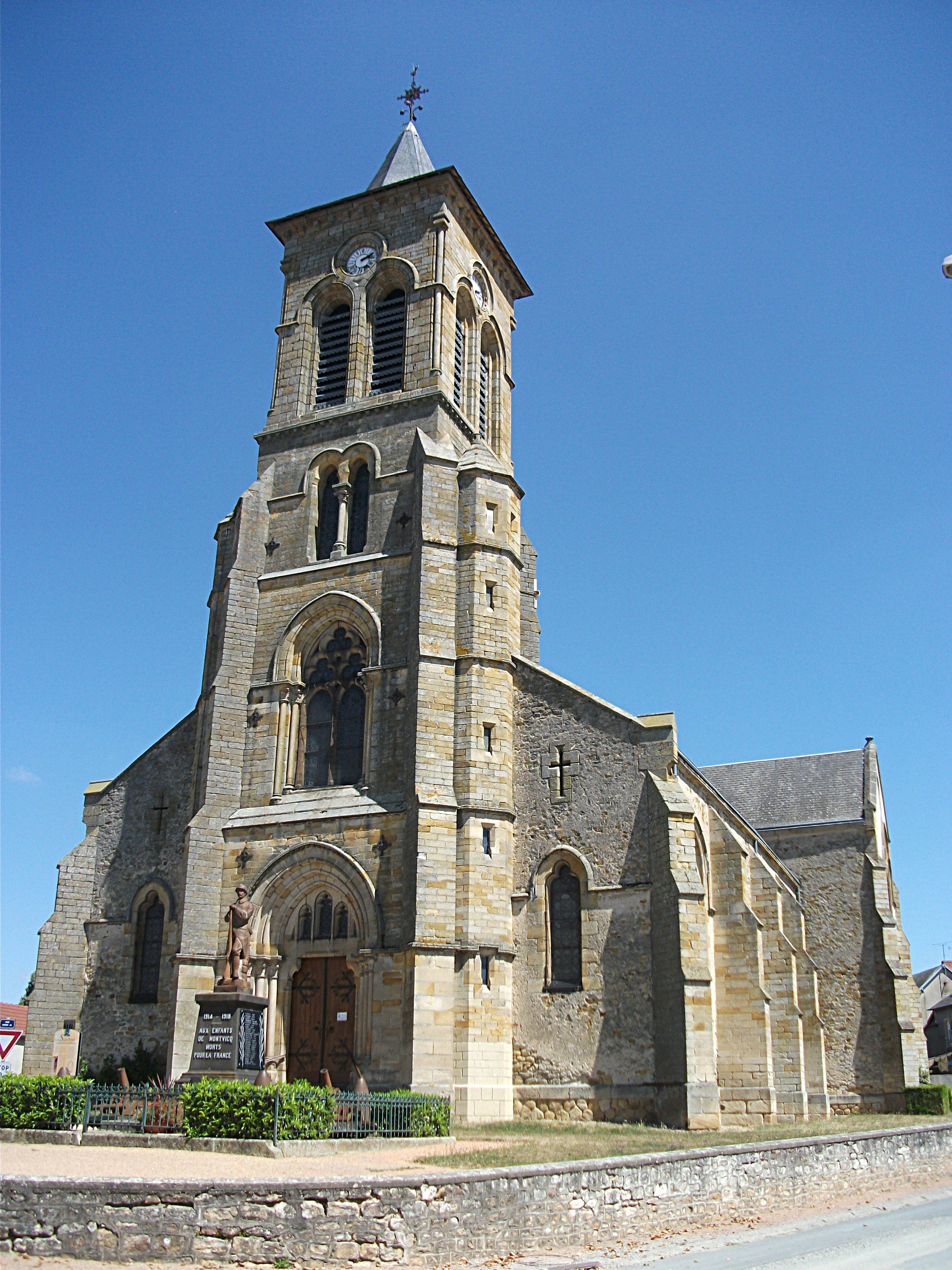
- Church

- Coat of arms
- Location of Montvicq
- Location within France Location within Auvergne-Rhône-Alpes
- Coordinates: 46°19′15″N 2°49′20″E
- Country: France
- Region: Auvergne-Rhône-Alpes
- Department: Allier
- Arrondissement: Montluçon
- Canton: Commentry
- Intercommunality: Commentry Montmarault Néris Communauté

Government
  - Mayor (2026–32): Magali Boulogne
- Area^{1}: 10.02 km^{2} (3.87 sq mi)
- Elevation: 360 m (1,180 ft)
- Highest elevation: 402 m (1,319 ft)
- Lowest elevation: 281 m (922 ft)
- Population (2023): 692
  - Density: 69.1/km^{2} (179/sq mi)
- Time zone: UTC+01:00 (CET)
  - Summer (DST): UTC+02:00 (CEST)
- INSEE/Postal code: 03189 /03170
- ^{1} French Land Register data, which excludes lakes, ponds, glaciers > 1 km^{2} (0.386 sq mi or 247 acres) and river estuaries.

Montvicq (French pronunciation: [mɔ̃vik]; Occitan: Montvic) is a commune in the Allier department in central France.

== Population ==
Historical population
Year	Pop.	±% p.a.
1968	830	—
1975	802	−0.49%
1982	677	−2.39%
1990	677	+0.00%
1999	685	+0.13%
2007	731	+0.82%
2012	731	+0.00%
2017	720	−0.30%
2023	692	−0.66%
Source: INSEE

== See also ==
- Communes of the Allier department
