= Sazeret =

- Commune
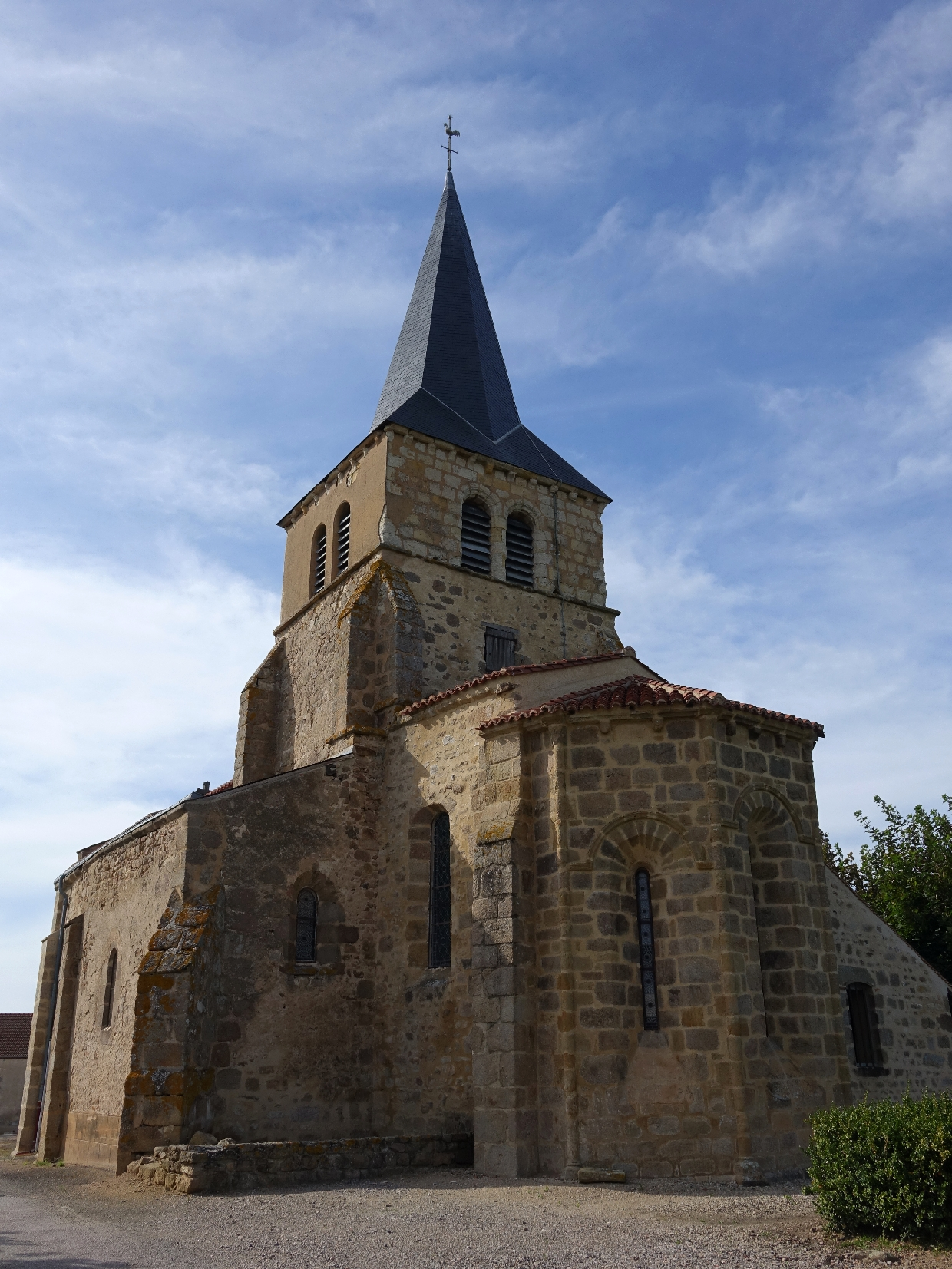
- The church in Sazeret
- Location of Sazeret
- Location within France Location within Auvergne-Rhône-Alpes
- Coordinates: 46°20′25″N 2°57′24″E
- Country: France
- Region: Auvergne-Rhône-Alpes
- Department: Allier
- Arrondissement: Montluçon
- Canton: Commentry

Government
  - Mayor (2026–32): Viviane Alloin
- Area^{1}: 17.94 km^{2} (6.93 sq mi)
- Elevation: 430 m (1,410 ft)
- Highest elevation: 497 m (1,631 ft)
- Lowest elevation: 348 m (1,142 ft)
- Population (2023): 140
  - Density: 7.8/km^{2} (20/sq mi)
- Time zone: UTC+01:00 (CET)
  - Summer (DST): UTC+02:00 (CEST)
- INSEE/Postal code: 03270 /03390
- ^{1} French Land Register data, which excludes lakes, ponds, glaciers > 1 km^{2} (0.386 sq mi or 247 acres) and river estuaries.

Sazeret (French pronunciation: [sazʁɛ]) is a commune in the Allier department in Auvergne-Rhône-Alpes in central France.

== Population ==
Historical population
Year	Pop.	±% p.a.
1968	261	—
1975	228	−1.91%
1982	188	−2.72%
1990	153	−2.54%
1999	149	−0.29%
2007	153	+0.33%
2012	164	+1.40%
2017	148	−2.03%
2023	140	−0.92%
Source: INSEE

== See also ==
- Communes of the Allier department
