= Chappes, Allier =

Chappes
- Commune
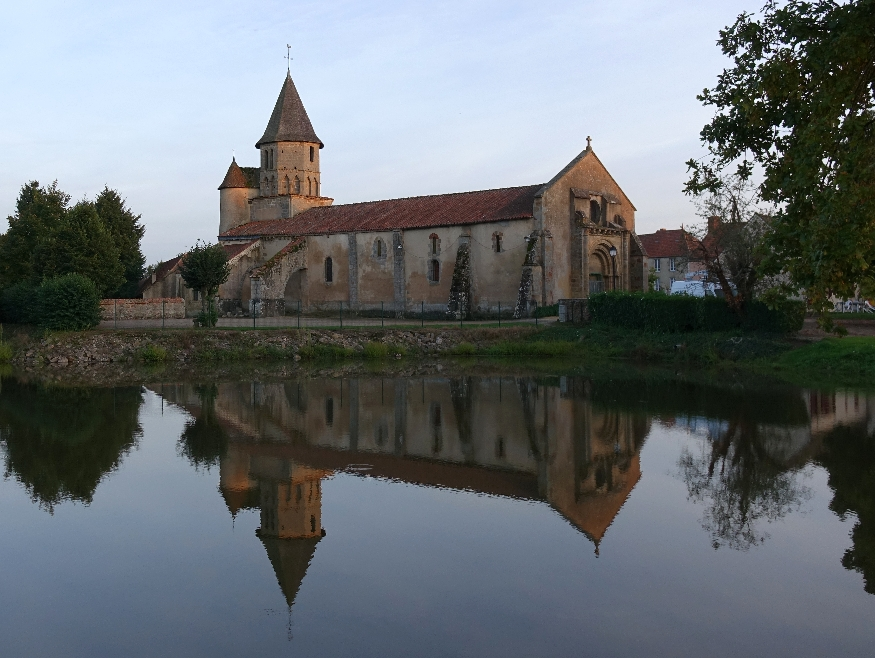
- The church in Chappes
- Location of Chappes
- Location within France Location within Auvergne-Rhône-Alpes
- Coordinates: 46°23′19″N 2°55′38″E
- Country: France
- Region: Auvergne-Rhône-Alpes
- Department: Allier
- Arrondissement: Montluçon
- Canton: Commentry
- Intercommunality: Commentry Montmarault Néris Communauté

Government
  - Mayor (2026–32): Richard Aumaitre
- Area^{1}: 18.6 km^{2} (7.2 sq mi)
- Elevation: 410 m (1,350 ft)
- Highest elevation: 436 m (1,430 ft)
- Lowest elevation: 290 m (950 ft)
- Population (2023): 220
  - Density: 12/km^{2} (31/sq mi)
- Time zone: UTC+01:00 (CET)
  - Summer (DST): UTC+02:00 (CEST)
- INSEE/Postal code: 03058 /03390
- ^{1} French Land Register data, which excludes lakes, ponds, glaciers > 1 km^{2} (0.386 sq mi or 247 acres) and river estuaries.

Chappes (French pronunciation: [ʃap]; Occitan: Chapas) is a commune in the Allier department in central France.

== Population ==
Historical population
Year	Pop.	±% p.a.
1968	352	—
1975	307	−1.94%
1982	240	−3.46%
1990	219	−1.14%
1999	221	+0.10%
2007	205	−0.94%
2012	204	−0.10%
2017	229	+2.34%
2023	220	−0.67%
Source: INSEE

== See also ==
- Communes of the Allier department
