= Villefranche-d'Allier =

Villefranche-d’Allier
- Commune
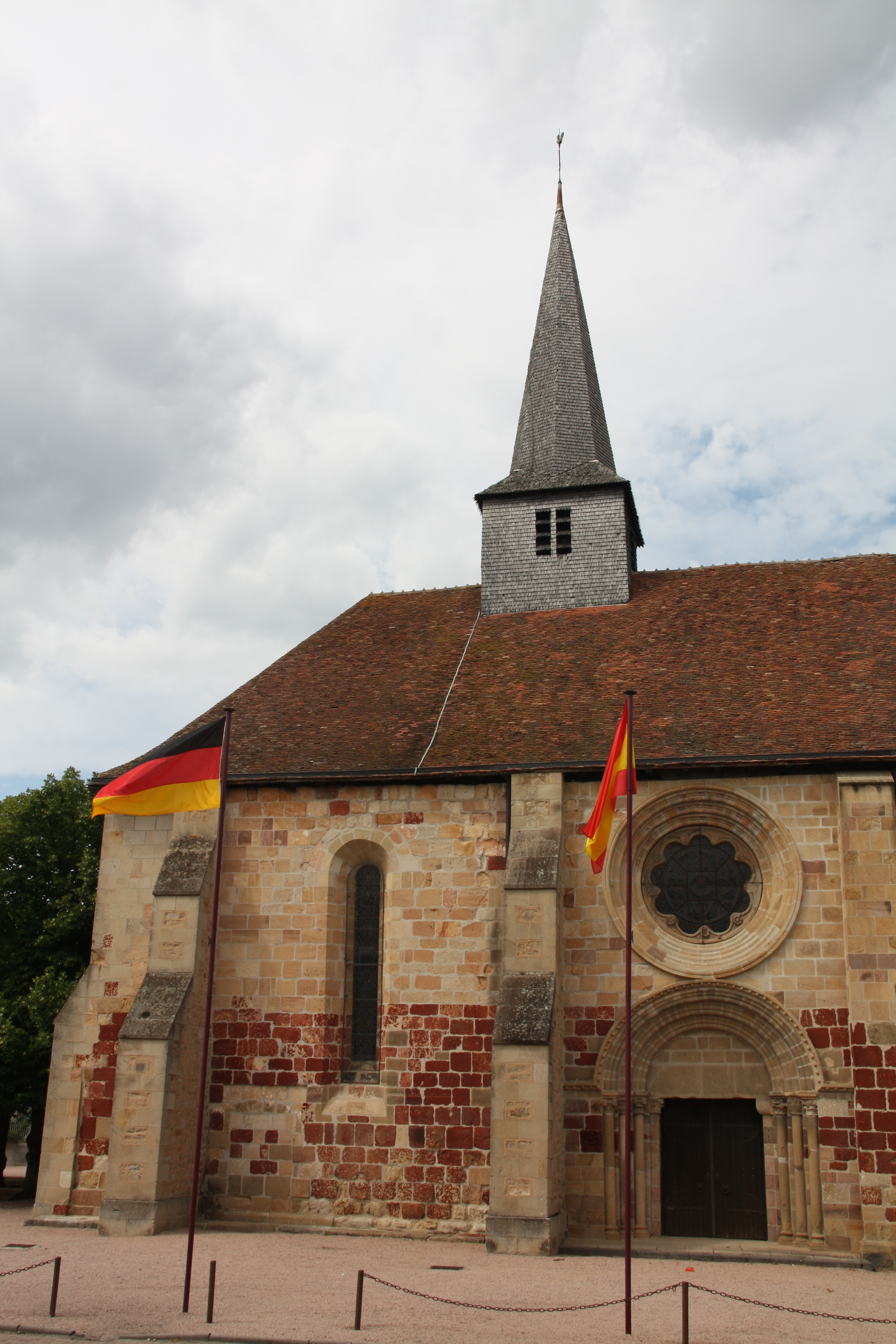
- The church in Villefranche-d'Allier

- Coat of arms
- Location of Villefranche-d’Allier
- Location within France Location within Auvergne-Rhône-Alpes
- Coordinates: 46°23′51″N 2°51′29″E
- Country: France
- Region: Auvergne-Rhône-Alpes
- Department: Allier
- Arrondissement: Montluçon
- Canton: Commentry
- Intercommunality: Commentry Montmarault Néris Communauté

Government
  - Mayor (2026–32): Josiane Auberger
- Area^{1}: 39.63 km^{2} (15.30 sq mi)
- Elevation: 280 m (920 ft)
- Highest elevation: 351 m (1,152 ft)
- Lowest elevation: 227 m (745 ft)
- Population (2023): 1,238
  - Density: 31.24/km^{2} (80.91/sq mi)
- Time zone: UTC+01:00 (CET)
  - Summer (DST): UTC+02:00 (CEST)
- INSEE/Postal code: 03315 /03430
- ^{1} French Land Register data, which excludes lakes, ponds, glaciers > 1 km^{2} (0.386 sq mi or 247 acres) and river estuaries.

Villefranche-d'Allier (French pronunciation: [vilfʁɑ̃ʃ dalje]; Auvergnat: Vilafrancha (d'Alèir)) is a commune in the Allier department in Auvergne-Rhône-Alpes in central France.

== Population ==
Historical population
| Year | Pop. | ±% p.a. |
|---|---|---|
| 1968 | 1,347 | — |
| 1975 | 1,273 | −0.80% |
| 1982 | 1,272 | −0.01% |
| 1990 | 1,360 | +0.84% |
| 1999 | 1,306 | −0.45% |
| 2007 | 1,331 | +0.24% |
| 2012 | 1,334 | +0.05% |
| 2017 | 1,328 | −0.09% |
| 2023 | 1,238 | −1.16% |
Source: INSEE

== See also ==
- Communes of the Allier department
