= Doyet =

- Commune
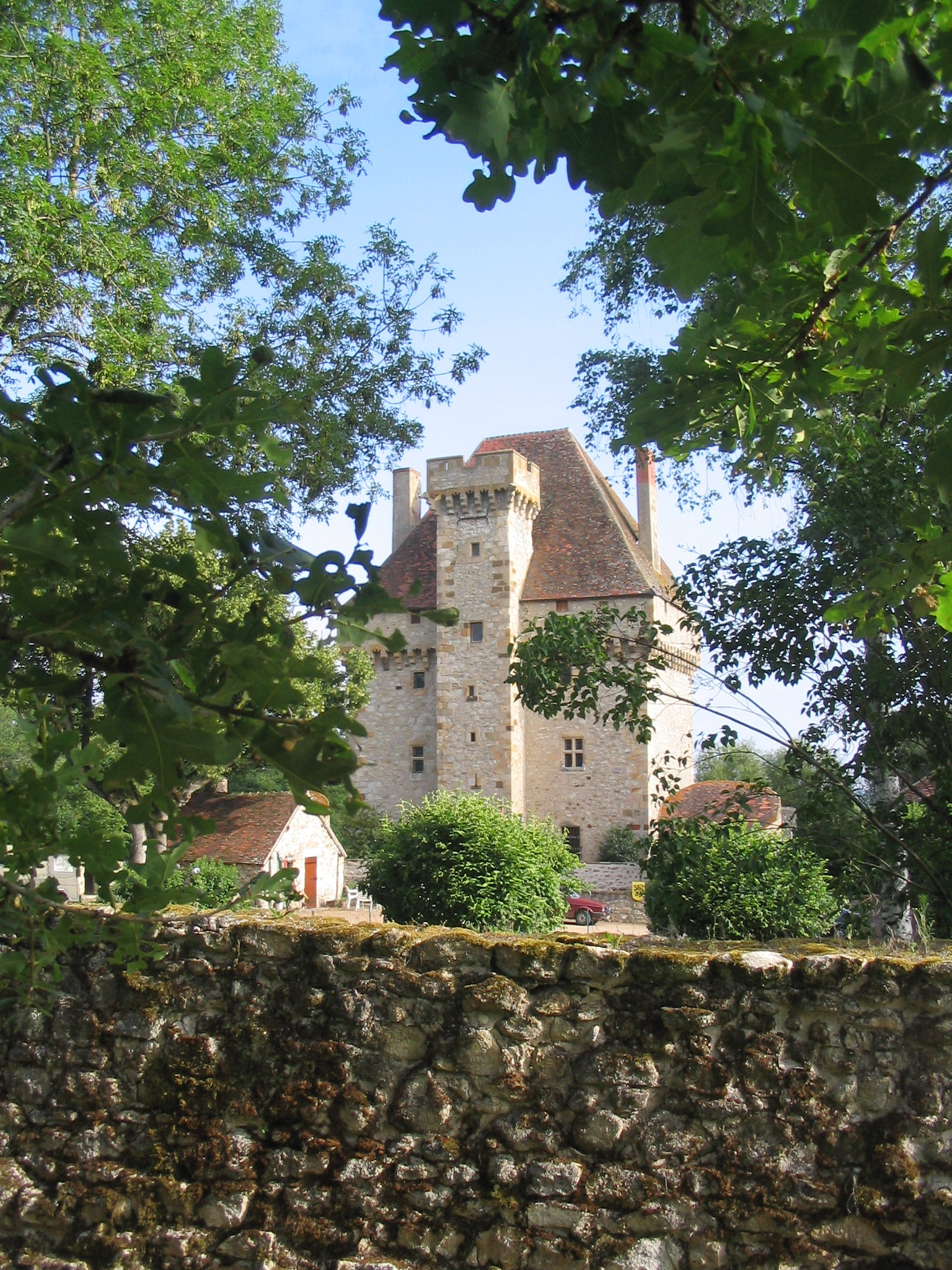
- The chateau in Doyet
- Location of Doyet
- Location within France Location within Auvergne-Rhône-Alpes
- Coordinates: 46°20′10″N 2°47′53″E
- Country: France
- Region: Auvergne-Rhône-Alpes
- Department: Allier
- Arrondissement: Montluçon
- Canton: Commentry

Government
  - Mayor (2026–32): Pierre-Henri Bonhomme
- Area^{1}: 27.58 km^{2} (10.65 sq mi)
- Elevation: 316 m (1,037 ft)
- Highest elevation: 386 m (1,266 ft)
- Lowest elevation: 254 m (833 ft)
- Population (2023): 1,109
  - Density: 40.21/km^{2} (104.1/sq mi)
- Time zone: UTC+01:00 (CET)
  - Summer (DST): UTC+02:00 (CEST)
- INSEE/Postal code: 03104 /03170
- ^{1} French Land Register data, which excludes lakes, ponds, glaciers > 1 km^{2} (0.386 sq mi or 247 acres) and river estuaries.

Doyet (French pronunciation: [dwajɛ]; Occitan: Dolhet) is a commune in the Allier department in central France. Its inhabitants are called Doyétois.

== Geography ==
=== Location ===
Doyet has seven neighboring towns:

- Bézenet
- Chamblet
- Deneuille-les-Mines
- Malicorne
- Montvicq
- Saint-Angel
- Villefrance-d'Allier

== Population ==
Historical population
| Year | Pop. | ±% p.a. |
|---|---|---|
| 1968 | 1,404 | — |
| 1975 | 1,278 | −1.33% |
| 1982 | 1,191 | −1.00% |
| 1990 | 1,203 | +0.13% |
| 1999 | 1,164 | −0.37% |
| 2007 | 1,224 | +0.63% |
| 2012 | 1,237 | +0.21% |
| 2017 | 1,183 | −0.89% |
| 2023 | 1,109 | −1.07% |
Source: INSEE

== See also ==
- Communes of the Allier department
