= Beaune-d'Allier =

- Commune
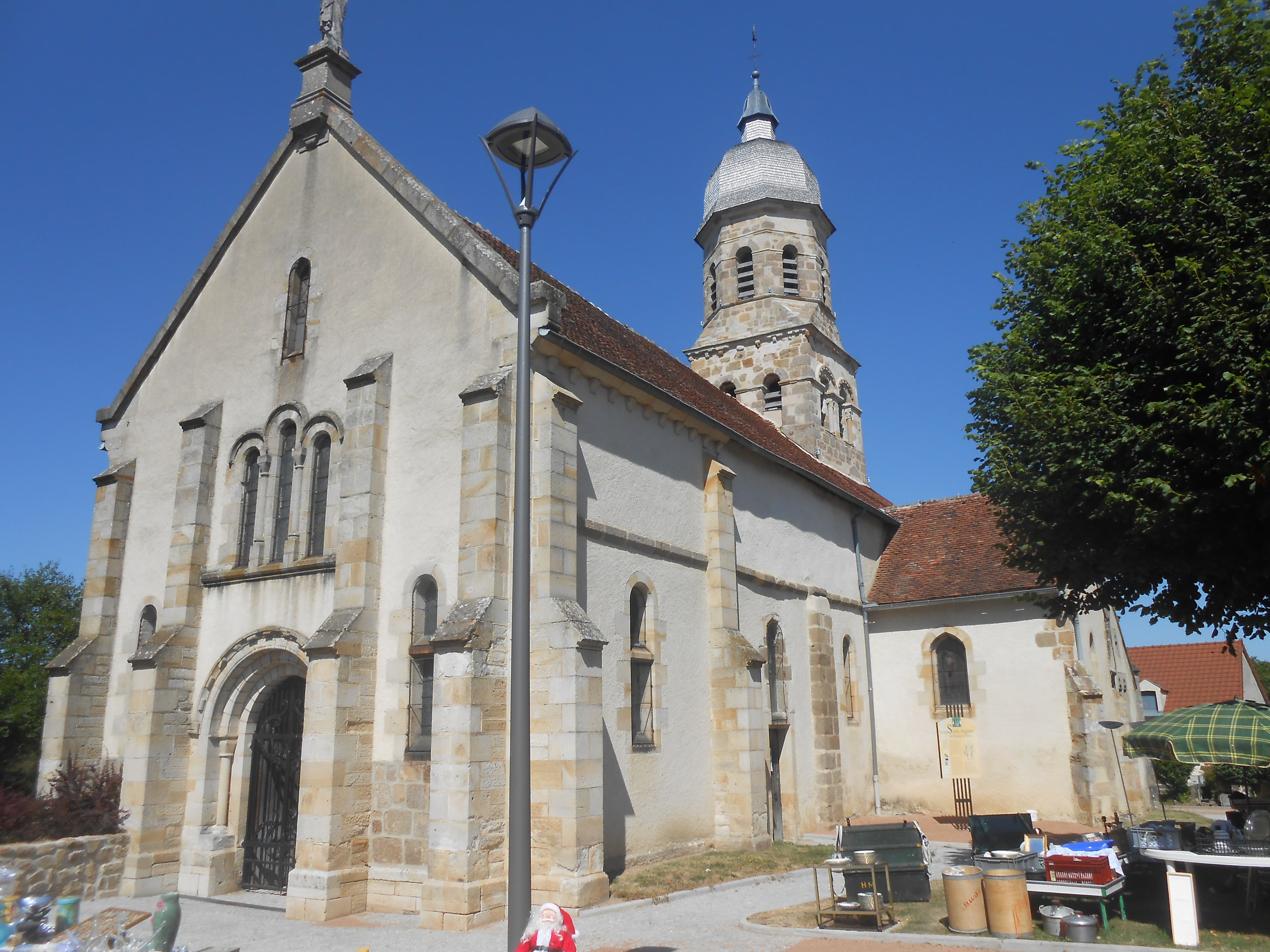
- Beaune church.

- Coat of arms
- Location of Beaune-d'Allier
- Location within France Location within Auvergne-Rhône-Alpes
- Coordinates: 46°16′55″N 2°53′09″E
- Country: France
- Region: Auvergne-Rhône-Alpes
- Department: Allier
- Arrondissement: Montluçon
- Canton: Commentry
- Intercommunality: Commentry Montmarault Néris Communauté

Government
  - Mayor (2026–32): Séverine Markowski
- Area^{1}: 24.2 km^{2} (9.3 sq mi)
- Elevation: 487 m (1,598 ft)
- Highest elevation: 586 m (1,923 ft)
- Lowest elevation: 360 m (1,180 ft)
- Population (2023): 296
  - Density: 12.2/km^{2} (31.7/sq mi)
- Time zone: UTC+01:00 (CET)
  - Summer (DST): UTC+02:00 (CEST)
- INSEE/Postal code: 03020 /03390
- ^{1} French Land Register data, which excludes lakes, ponds, glaciers > 1 km^{2} (0.386 sq mi or 247 acres) and river estuaries.

Beaune-d'Allier is a commune in the Allier department in central France.

== Population ==
Historical population
Year	Pop.	±% p.a.
1968	462	—
1975	405	−1.86%
1982	327	−3.01%
1990	280	−1.92%
1999	270	−0.40%
2007	288	+0.81%
2012	292	+0.28%
2017	291	−0.07%
2023	296	+0.28%
Source: INSEE

== See also ==
- Communes of the Allier department
