= Montmarault =

- Commune
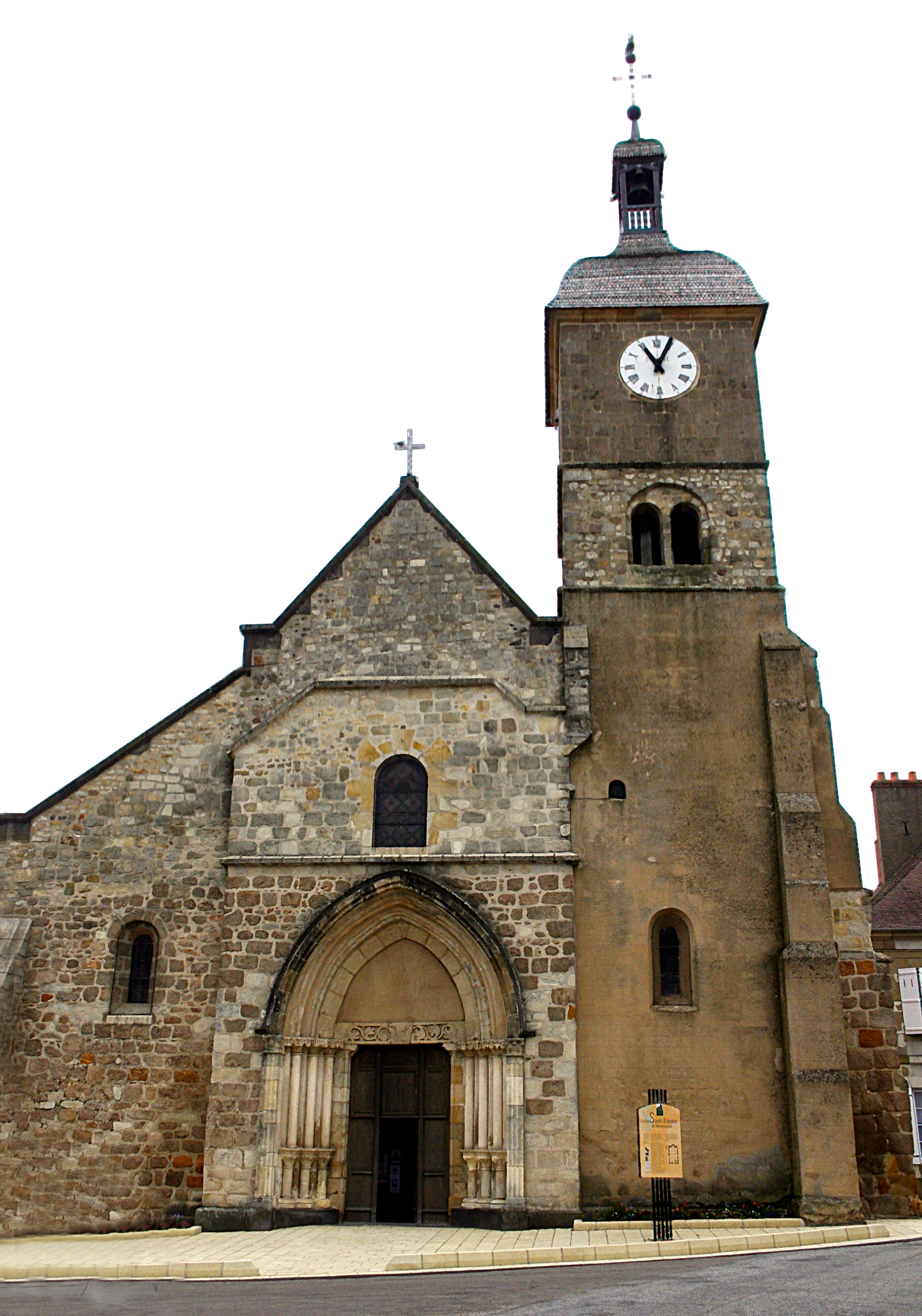
- The church in Montmarault

- Coat of arms
- Location of Montmarault
- Location within France Location within Auvergne-Rhône-Alpes
- Coordinates: 46°19′06″N 2°57′20″E
- Country: France
- Region: Auvergne-Rhône-Alpes
- Department: Allier
- Arrondissement: Montluçon
- Canton: Commentry
- Intercommunality: Commentry Montmarault Néris Communauté

Government
  - Mayor (2026–32): Didier Lindron
- Area^{1}: 9 km^{2} (3.5 sq mi)
- Elevation: 487 m (1,598 ft)
- Highest elevation: 498 m (1,634 ft)
- Lowest elevation: 394 m (1,293 ft)
- Population (2023): 1,525
  - Density: 170/km^{2} (440/sq mi)
- Time zone: UTC+01:00 (CET)
  - Summer (DST): UTC+02:00 (CEST)
- INSEE/Postal code: 03186 /03390
- ^{1} French Land Register data, which excludes lakes, ponds, glaciers > 1 km^{2} (0.386 sq mi or 247 acres) and river estuaries.

Montmarault (French pronunciation: [mɔ̃maʁo]; Occitan: Montmaraut) is a commune in the Allier department in central France.

The commune is listed as a Village étape.

== Population ==
Historical population
Year	Pop.	±% p.a.
1968	1,446	—
1975	1,366	−0.81%
1982	1,443	+0.79%
1990	1,597	+1.28%
1999	1,663	+0.45%
2007	1,574	−0.69%
2012	1,503	−0.92%
2017	1,521	+0.24%
2023	1,525	+0.04%
Source: INSEE

== Tourism ==
The Petite Valette campground has been named the best camping of the Auvergne by the German ADAC.

== See also ==
- Communes of the Allier department
