= Forest of Tronçais =

National forest in Allier, France

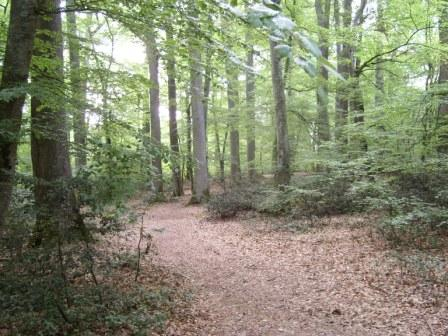

- Location within France
- Location: Allier, Auvergne, France
- Coordinates: 46°37′N 2°46′E
- Area: 10,600 ha (41 sq mi)
- Elevation: 205–360 m (673–1,181 ft)
- Designation: ZNIEFF, Réseau Natura 2000, réserve biologique intégrale
- Created: 1670
- Designated: Forêt d'Exception (2018)
- Administrator: National Forests Office (ONF)

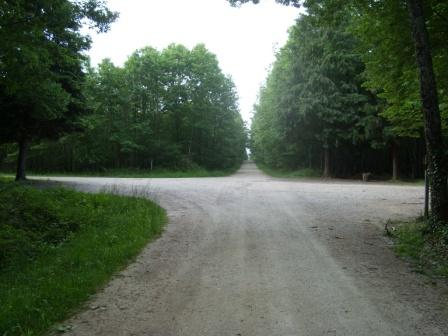
Typical straight roads through the forest

The Forest of Tronçais (French: Forêt de Tronçais, IPA: [tʁɔ̃sɛ]) is a national forest comprising 10,600 hectares (26,000 acres) in the Allier department of central France. It is managed by the National Forests Office (ONF). Its oaks, planted by Louis XIV's minister Jean-Baptiste Colbert to supply the French Navy, constitute one of the principal stands of oaks in Europe.

Within the forest boundaries are the communes of Braize, Cérilly, Isle-et-Bardais, Le Brethon, Meaulne-Vitray, Saint-Bonnet-Tronçais, Urçay and Valigny. It is mainly made up of sessile oak. It also contains 130 hectares (320 acres) of ponds and is deemed by many as the most beautiful oakwood in Europe.

== Geography ==
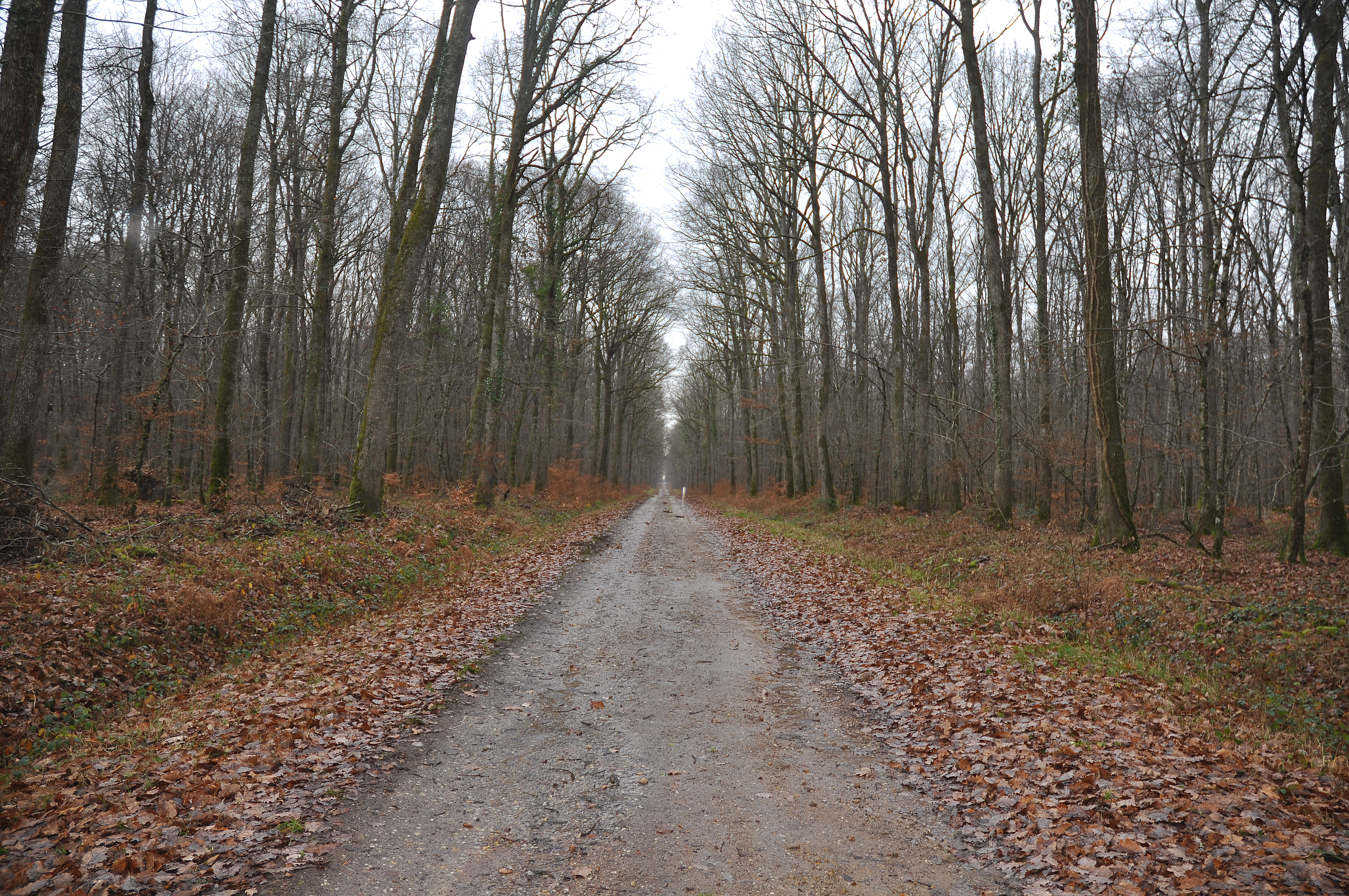
Path near the "Chêne carré" (December 2011)

The Forest of Tronçais is located in the inventaire forestier national (INF) sylvoecoregion of Boischaut et Champagne Berrichonne. The forest constitutes the most part of the massif du Tronçais, a highland region which spans about 12,000 ha (30,000 acres) and is part of the Massif Central.

The massif is located in the Allier department of the Bourbonnais region. The oakwood spans the communes of Braize (776 ha), Cérilly, Allier (1,788 ha), Couleuvre (405 ha), Isle-et-Bardais (2,788 ha), Le Brethon (1,400 ha), Meaulne (112 ha), Saint-Bonnet-Tronçais (1,176 ha), Urçay (343 ha), Valigny (17 ha) and Vitray (1,728 ha).

The massif has a general north–west orientation, with slight slopes, except in the massif de La Bouteille and stream hollows. Altitudes vary from 205 m (673 ft) in the northwest to 360 m (1,180 ft) in Bois Laid.

Annual rainfall is between 800 and 900 mm (31 and 35 in), with an average temperature of 10 °C (50 °F).

There are four main parts of the forest: l'Armenanche (east), la Réserve (centre), les Landes blanches (north-west) and la Bouteille (south-west). Several enclaves have created " open areas ". The contours of the écotone/lisières massif are very rugged.

=== Geology ===
The forest is located on the southern limit of the Paris Basin, on varied substrates (from the primary to the quaternary eras). Most of the forest is located on sandstone or clay from the triassic period.

=== Bodies of water ===
Two rivers cross the massif: the Marmande and its tributary the Sologne. The Marmande is a tributary of the Cher which feeds the Loire. There are also five ponds (French: l'étang):

- L'étang de Saint-Bonnet (44 ha) – This natural pond was enlarged at the end of the 18th century to sustain the level of l'étang de Morat.
- L'étang de Tronçais (18 ha) – On la Sologne, created in 1789 to provide energy to the forges of Tronçais
- L'étang de Morat (private) (13 ha) – On la Sologne, downstream of l'étang de Tronçais
- L'étang de Saloup (private) (12 ha) – Upstream of l'étang de Tronçais
- L'étang de Pirot (70 ha) – On la Marmande, this 14-metre-deep (46 ft) pond was in operation in 1848 to feed the canal de Berry via l'étang de Goule.

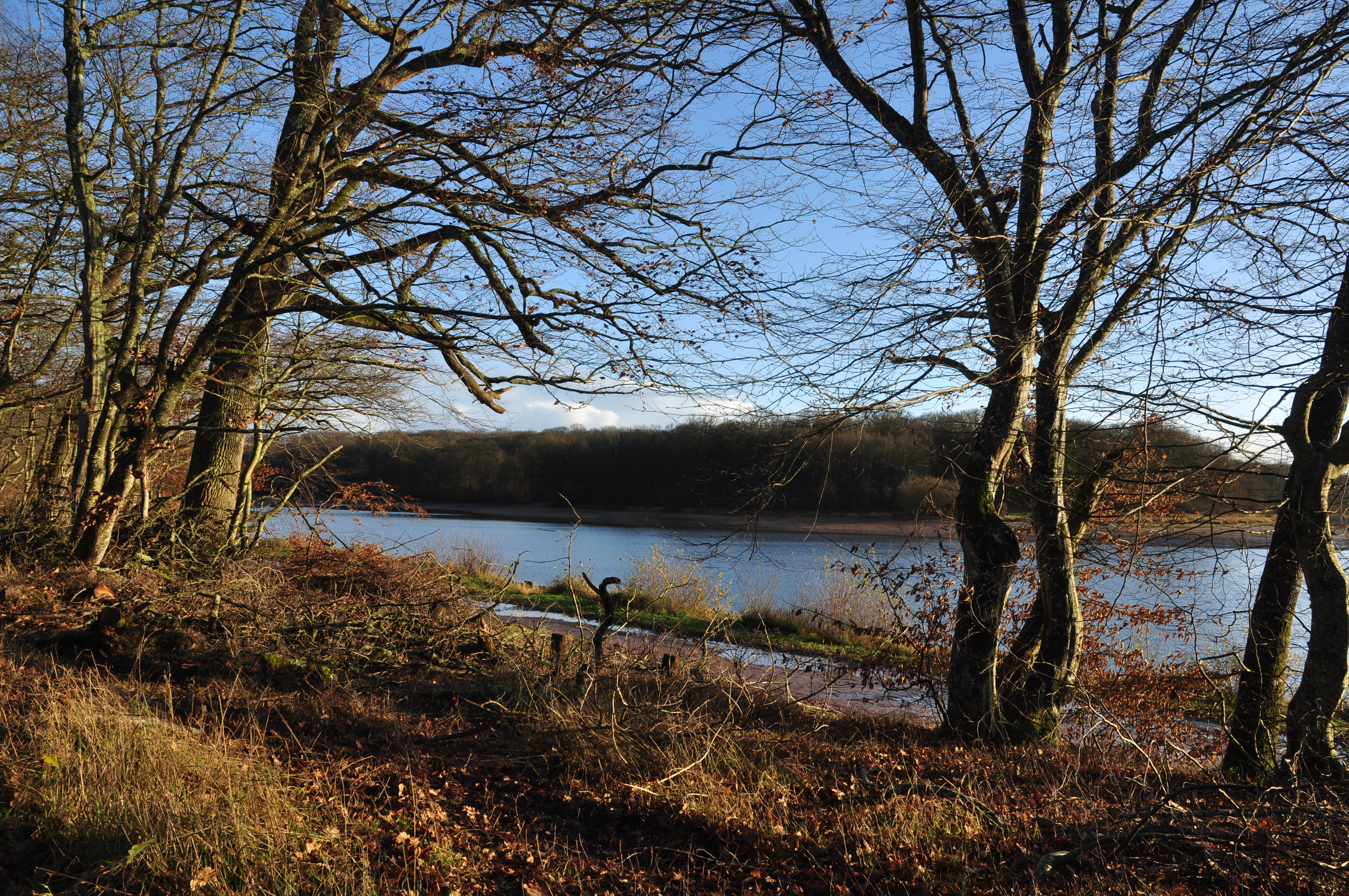
L'étang de Pirot (December 2011)

There are about 100 spring sources in the forest:

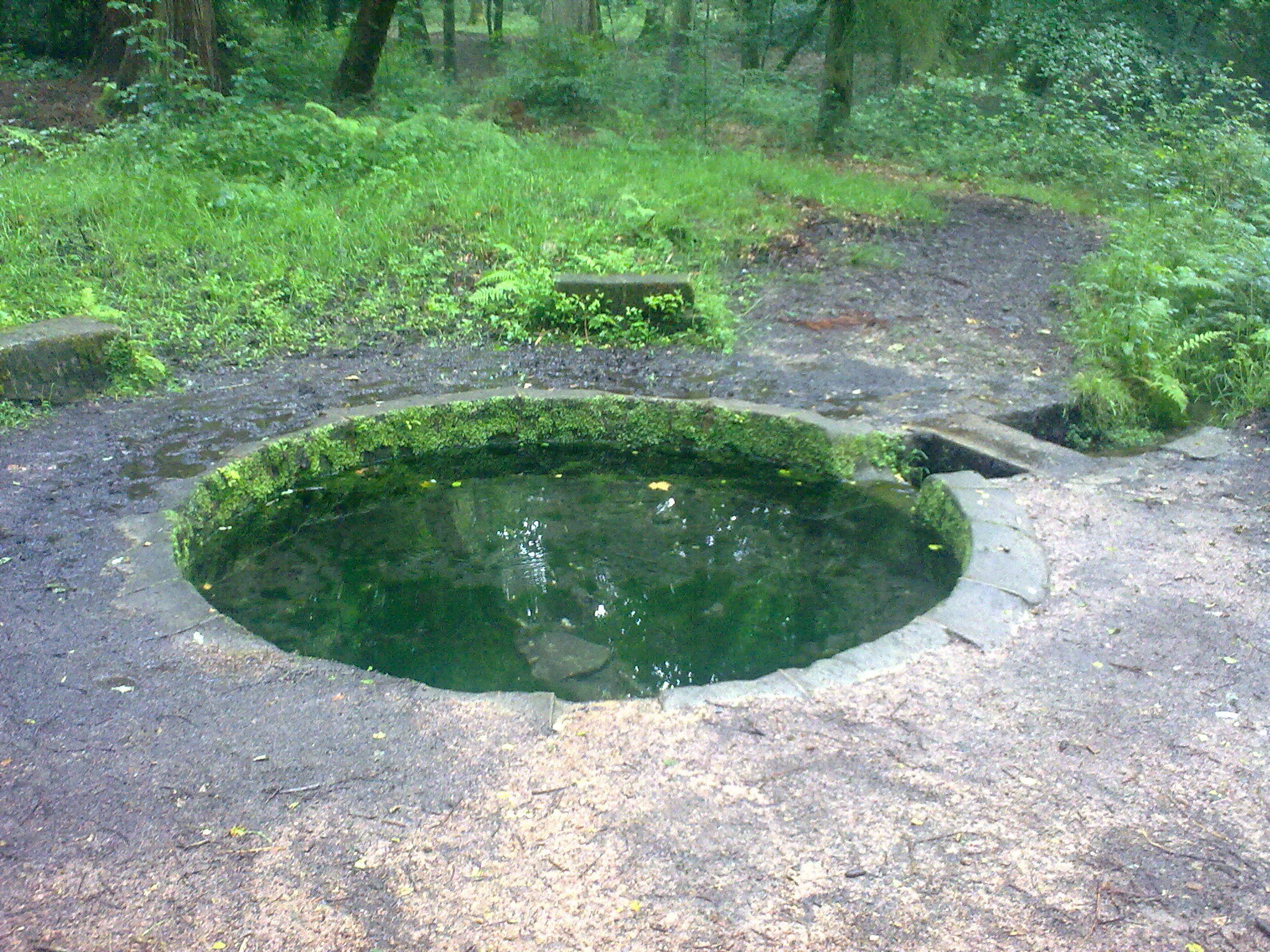
la font de Viljot

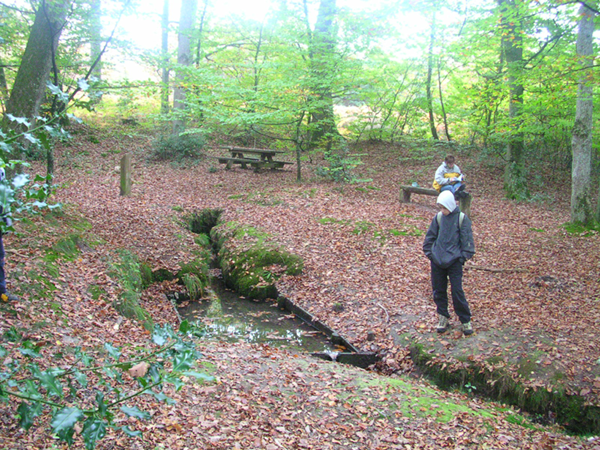
la font Jarsaud

== Flora ==
The principal trees are sessile oak (Quercus petraea) (73%), whose ancient name in French, tronce, gave its name to the district. Other dominant species are beech (Fagus sylvatica) (9%) and pedunculate oak (Q. robur) (8%), with hornbeam and Scots pine planted in the poorer soils. Trees are harvested on a rotation averaging 250 years.

The massif plays an important role for biodiversity for many species on a national level. It also hosts many grove-like landscapes or paysages bocagers (bocage bourbonnais, seasonal agropastoral bocage and permanent grassland landscape).

Other nearby massifs include:

- la Forêt des Colettes, north of the Chouvigny gorges, spanning over 3,000 ha and which hosts a few rare and patrimonial breeds like the Rosalia longicorn, the great crested newt (protected species at European level) and the yellow-bellied toad
- la forêt de Bagnolet
- la forêt de Messarges
- la forêt de l'Espinasse
- la forêt de Gros-Bois
- la forêt de Civrais

A number of oak specimens have been preserved for heritage. Among these are (pictured below):

- Chêne carré (Square oak) 6.44 m (21.1 ft) circumference, more than 300 years old, parcel 215
- Chênes jumeaux (Twin oaks) 4.45 and 5.10 m (14.6 and 16.7 ft) circumference, more than 400 years old, parcel 137
- Chêne Sentinelle (Sentinel oak) 6.5 m (21 ft) circumference, more than 400 years old, parcel 136
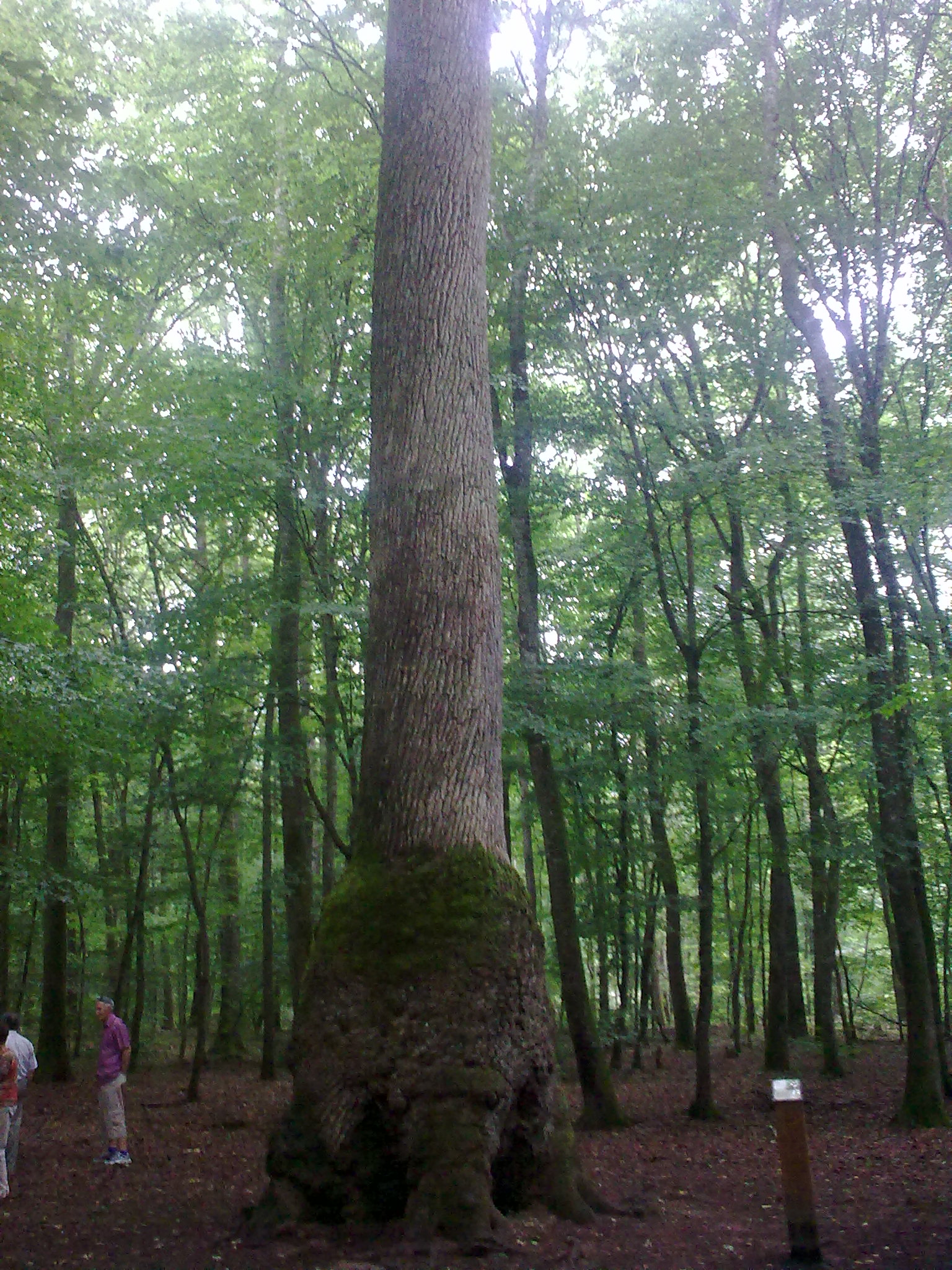
Square oak

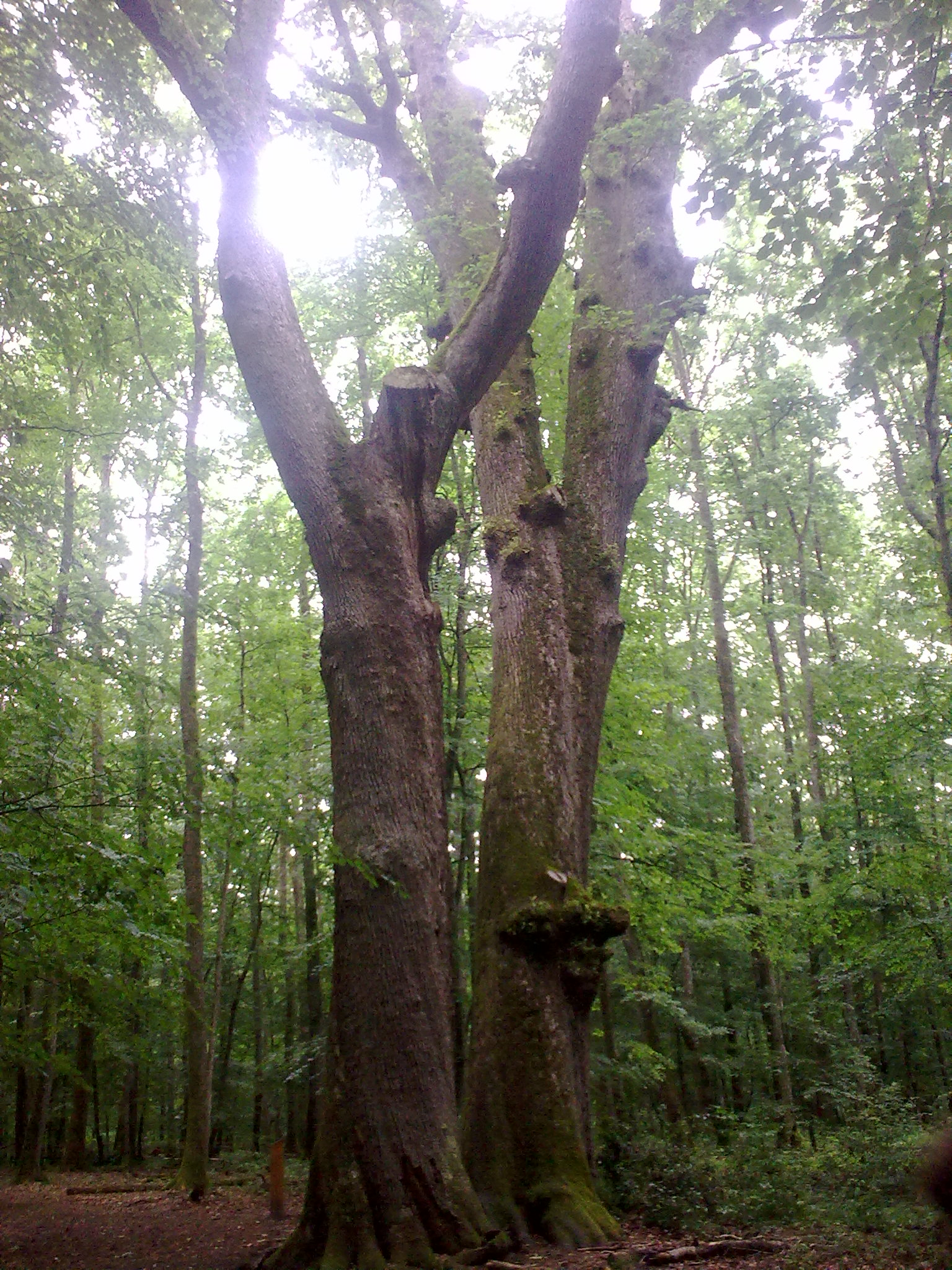
Twin oaks

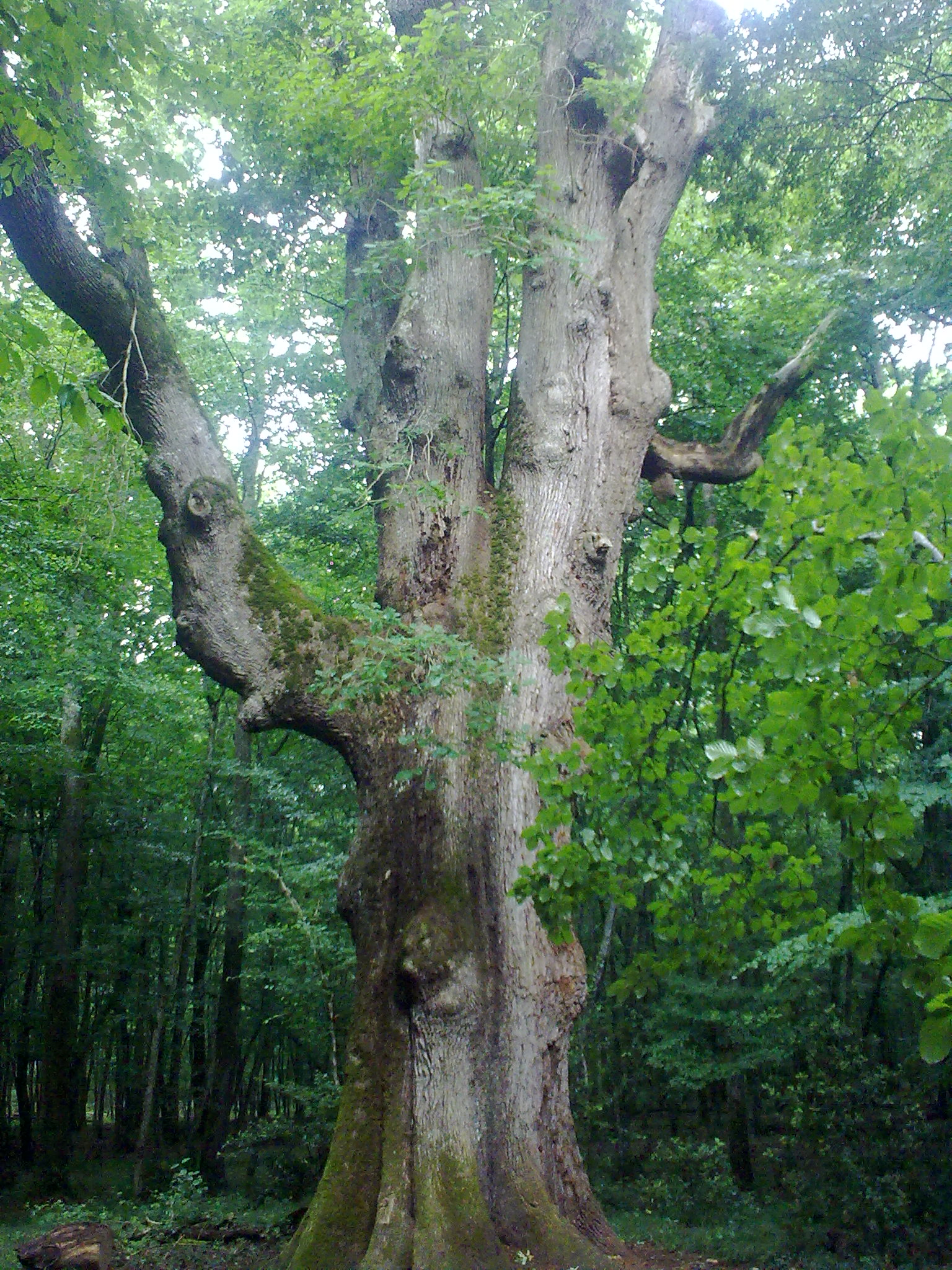
Sentinel oak

== Fauna ==
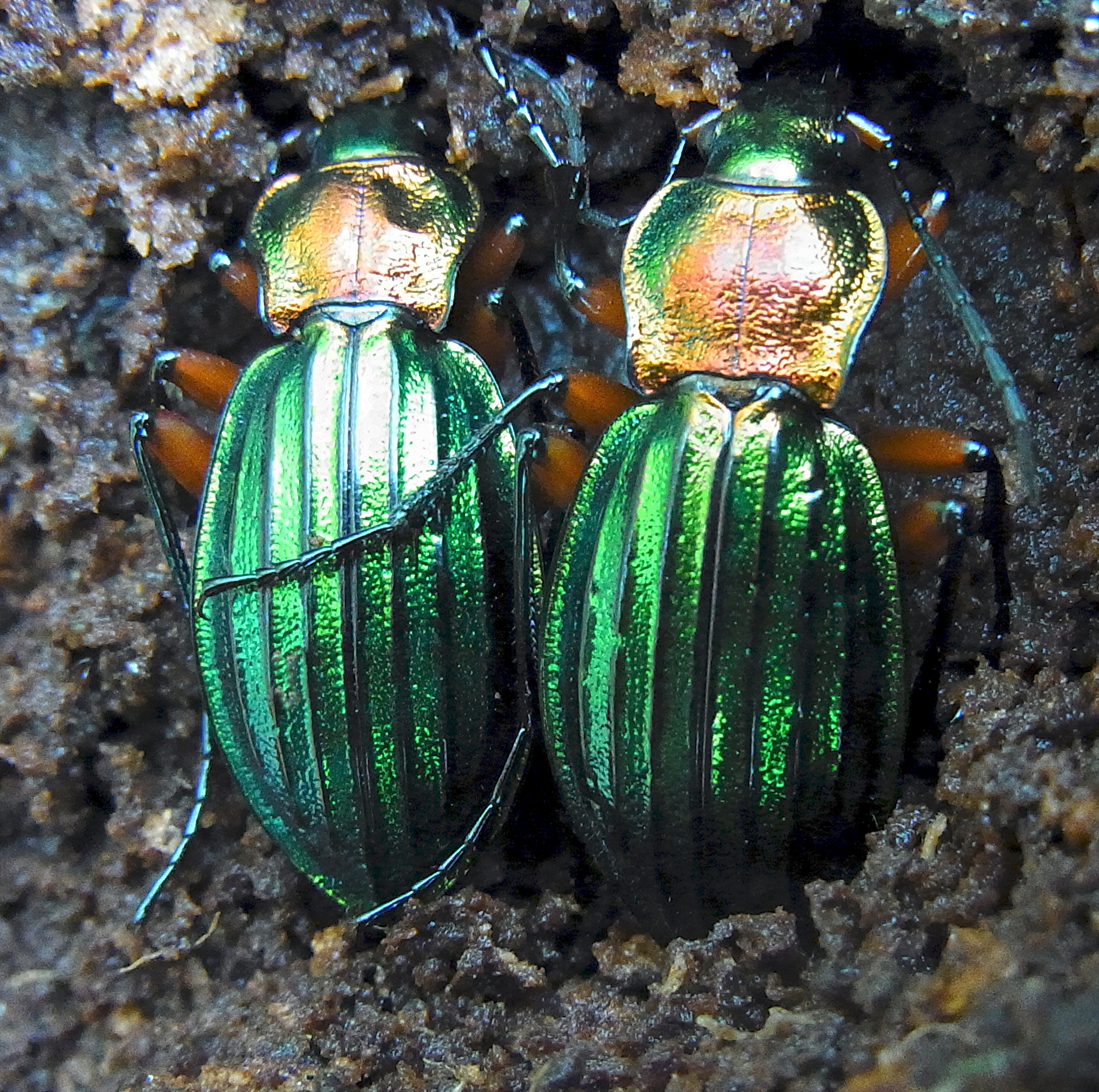
Carabus auronitens

There are predators such as common buzzard, booted eagle, northern goshawk, hen harrier, etc., and many breeds of bats. The diversity of insects is also very important, notably in the parcels of the old wood (i.e.: the Colbert Forest). Important populations of stag, roe and wild boar are regulated by hunting.

== History ==
=== Roman era ===
The land was cleared and intensively cultivated under the Roman Empire. 108 Roman habitations that have been discovered in the forest, most during recent decades. Roman manuring and fertilizing practices created a pocket of increased biodiversity, which has remained self-sustaining over two millennia and can be detected today.

=== Middle ages ===
Tronçais is first recorded from the 13th century, in a document relating to the priory de la Bouteille.

The forest was first owned by 14 nearby parishes, then yielded in 1327 to the Duke of Bourbon. The Forest of Tronçais has belonged to central power since 1527, when all land possessions were confiscated from the Constable of Bourbon by royal power.

=== Since 1670 ===
The forest is not a relic of the primeval forest that once covered most of France, but was organized by Jean-Baptiste Colbert in 1670. With forethought for the requirements of the French Navy two hundred years hence, the Colbert Forest was planted as an oak grove. The oaks were interplanted with beeches and larches to encourage their growth for favourable timber for ship's masts: straight, tall, and free of knots.

By the time the trees were fully mature, the navy was rapidly switching from sail to steam. The forest was diminished by the creation in 1788 of iron forges fed by charcoal from the forest, and by urgent cutting during the French Revolution and the Napoleonic period. The forest regenerated during the 19th century.

== Management ==
The forest is divided into 442 parcels of sessile oak (95% of the surface) and Scots pine or black pine (5%). Beech and hornbeam are also present, along with cherry and checker tree.

It is the only forest in France which is managed with harvesting of timber on a cycle exceeding 200 years.

=== The Colbert forest ===
The oldest trees are in the Colbert forest (French: la futaie Colbert). It is a 13 ha (32 acres) parcel, in two pieces, the main stand in a regeneration from the end of the 17th century. These are classified as a directed biological reserve; lumber is no longer taken in order to favour biodiversity around deadwood and senescent trees.

The Colbert high forest spanned 73 ha (180 acres) in 1976, of which 60 ha were regenerated from 1976 to 2001.

=== Barrels ===
The oaks of Tronçais, representing some 80% of timber production, are prized for the barrels coopered for cognac and the great wines of Bordeaux. This is linked to several elements, found in other national forests of the Loire basin:

- The age management in the high forest allows slender trees which are pruned naturally, leaving relatively few knots in the wood.
- Due to the summer water deficit and the density of the stands, the wood grows slowly, providing a fine and regular grain to the wood.
- The wood has a pink colour and a chemical composition appreciated in a raw (untreated) quality.

Amongst the more famous coopers using the oaks of Tronçais is Dominique Laurent, who makes what are widely regarded as some of the world's finest barrels. These have been nicknamed "magic casks", by wine taster Michel Bettane. Laurent goes into the Tronçais forest to select the trees (typically around 300 years of age) and transports them to the cooperage himself, thus guaranteeing provenance. He uses the top section of the trunk, the staves are split by hand and air dried for 52 months. Due to hand splitting, the staves have a thickness of 40–45 mm (1.6–1.8 in) compared to commercial barrels at 25–30 mm (0.98–1.18 in). The barrels were developed for Dominique Laurent, and Tardieu Laurent's top cuvees, but a few of the barrels are sold to French and international producers including DRC, Zind Humbrecht, Clos Mogador, Pingus and Beau Fréres. A limited number of barrels are exported to Australia where they are used by the boutique winemaker Torbreck for the making of shiraz.

== Forest art ==
Sculpted trunks have been installed in the forest's clearings by the National Forests Office (ONF) and the communes of Pays de Tronçais in 2008, 2010 and 2012.

== See also ==
French forestry Ordinance of 1669
