= Meaulne-Vitray =

- Commune
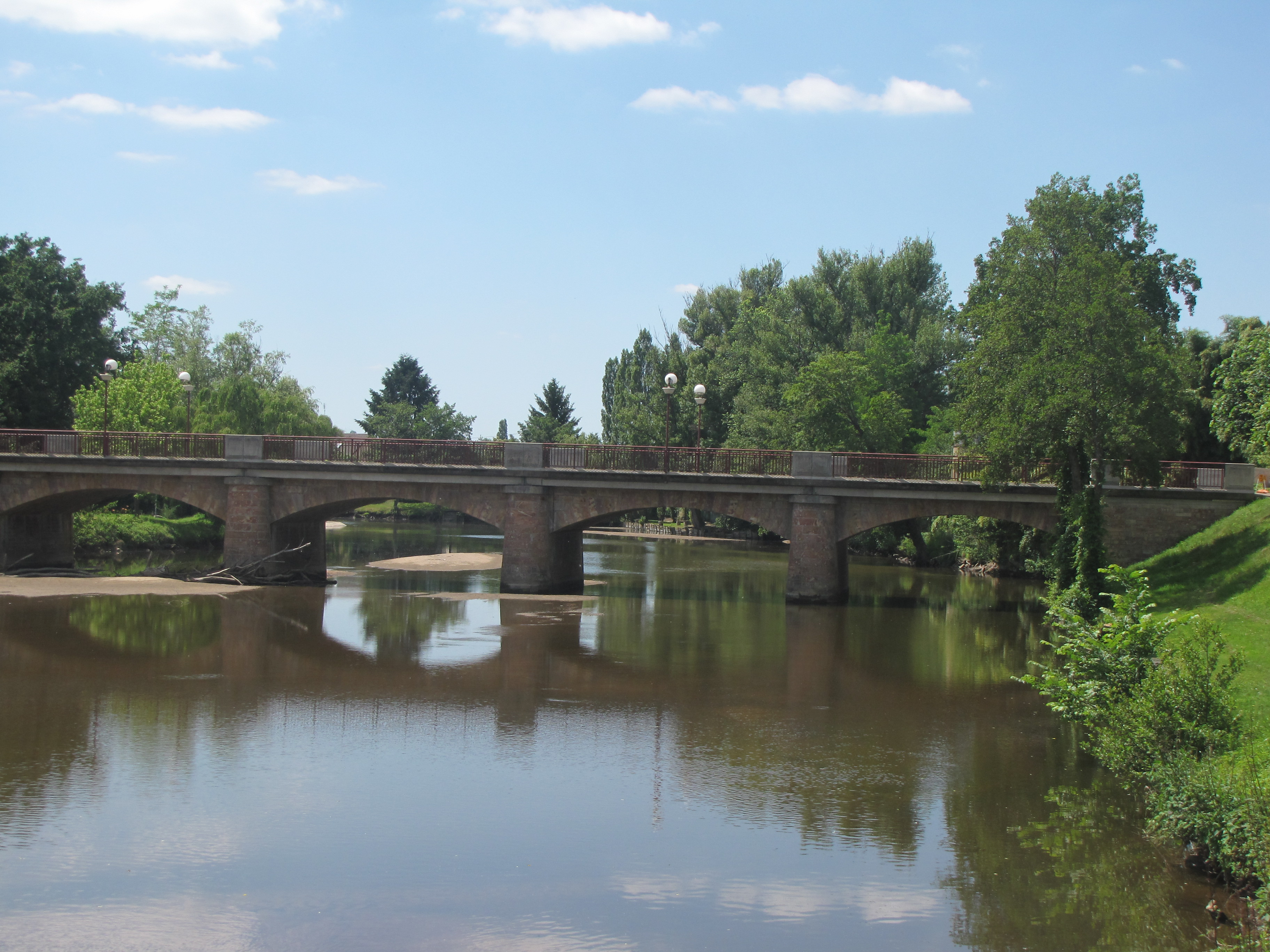
- The bridge on the Aumance in Meaulne
- Location of Meaulne-Vitray
- Location within France Location within Auvergne-Rhône-Alpes
- Coordinates: 46°35′56″N 2°36′58″E
- Country: France
- Region: Auvergne-Rhône-Alpes
- Department: Allier
- Arrondissement: Montluçon
- Canton: Bourbon-l'Archambault
- Intercommunality: CC du Pays de Tronçais

Government
  - Mayor (2026–32): Jérôme Jomier
- Area^{1}: 50.10 km^{2} (19.34 sq mi)
- Population (2023): 906
  - Density: 18.1/km^{2} (46.8/sq mi)
- Time zone: UTC+01:00 (CET)
  - Summer (DST): UTC+02:00 (CEST)
- INSEE/Postal code: 03168 /03360
- ^{1} French Land Register data, which excludes lakes, ponds, glaciers > 1 km^{2} (0.386 sq mi or 247 acres) and river estuaries.

Meaulne-Vitray (French pronunciation: [mo(l)n vitʁɛ]) is a commune in the department of Allier, central France. The municipality was established on 1 January 2017 by merger of the former communes of Meaulne (the seat) and Vitray.

== History ==
In an effort to guarantee the maintenances of public services in the face of the reduction in state donanations, the 1 January 2017, the communes of Meaulne and Vitray — which did not have a church, cemetery, and no longer a school, in addition to relying on infrastructure from Meaulne — fused to become the commune nouvelle of Meaulne-Vitray.

== Politics and administration ==
=== Administrative and electoral attachments ===
Meaulne-Vitray is situated in the Montluçon arrondissement in the department of Allier. Within the department, the commune is attached to the Canton of Bourbon-l'Archambault.

For legislative elections to the National Assembly, Meaulne-Vitray is part of Allier's 2nd legislative constituency.

=== Intercommunality ===
Since its inception the commune has been a part of the communauté de communes du Pays de Tronçais.

=== List of delegated communes ===
List of delegated communes of the Meaulne-Vitray
Delegated Commune	INSEE code	Intercommunality	Area (km^{2})	Population (2014)	Density (per km^{2})
Meaulne (seat)	03168	CC du Pays de Tronçais	21.07	776	37
Vitray	03318	CC du Pays de Tronçais	29.03	101	2.5

== Population ==
Population data refer to the area corresponding with the commune as of January 2025.

Historical population
Year	Pop.	±% p.a.
1968	1,112	—
1975	1,034	−1.03%
1982	960	−1.06%
1990	941	−0.25%
1999	889	−0.63%
2007	902	+0.18%
2012	878	−0.54%
2017	889	+0.25%
2023	906	+0.32%
Source: INSEE

== Local culture and heritage ==
=== Places and monuments ===
- Église Saint-Symphorien de Meaulne, built in the 17th century, the church has been inscribed as a monument historique since 1985. It is notable for containing the particular sculpted group: Vierge de Pitié from the 16th century, and has itself been a monument historique since 1975.
- Église Saint-Éloi de Vitray, built between the 12th and 17th centuries, the church consists of a bell tower entirely covered in shingles. It has been listed as a monument historique since 2 June 1976.
- Château du Plaix, built in the 17th century, the castle has been listed as a monument historique since 1985.
- Château des Alliers, located two kilometres from the town centre. The main body of the building dates back to the 17th century and was later supplemented with two pavilion-roofed wings. At one point the castle belonged to Général Georges Chevalier, the father of French philosopher and government minister during the Vichy regime Jacques Chevalier. The residence, surrounded by a vast property had been abandoned prior to being restored and maintained by its current owners.
- La GilPat, old 8 acres farm which was built in 1905 and located at the foot of the Château des Alliers.
- Forest of Tronçais.

== See also ==
- Communes of the Allier department
- List of new French communes created in 2017
