= Georges Chevalier (army officer) =

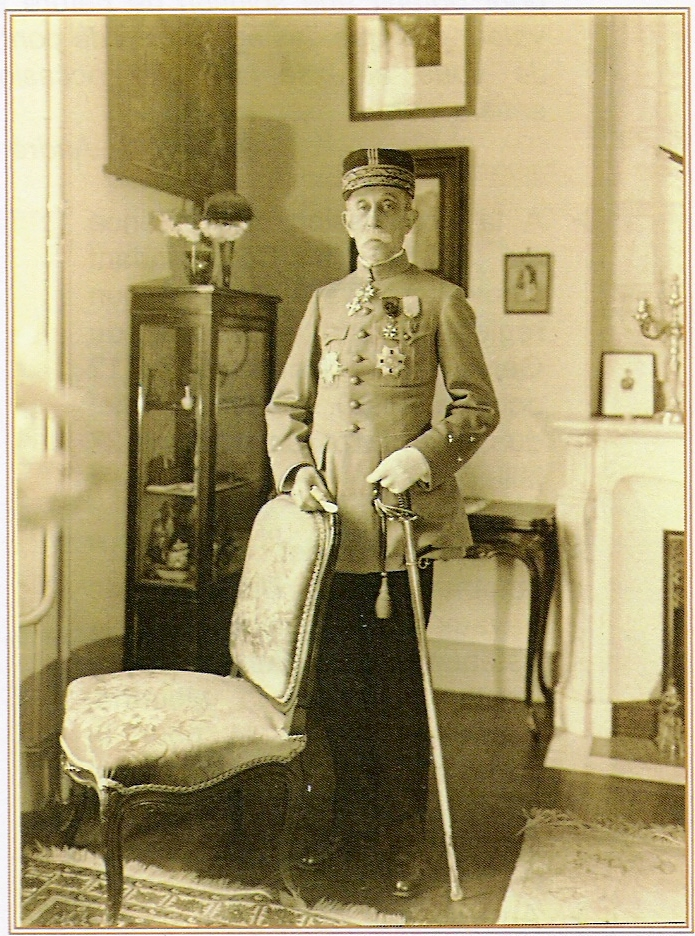
- Born: Louis Jacques Georges Chevalier; 18 September 1854; Moulins, Allier, France
- Died: 22 December 1938 (aged 84) Moulins, Allier, France
- Allegiance: France
- Branch: Army; Military Engineers
- Service years: 1870–1918
- Rank: Général de division
- Conflicts: First World War
- Children: Jacques Chevalier

Louis Jacques Georges Chevalier (French: [ʒak ʃəvalje]; 18 September 1854 – 22 December 1938) was a French military officer. He was head of engineering at the Ministry of War from 1910 to 1917. His son Jacques became a philosopher.

== Life ==
=== Youth ===
He was born in Moulins, Allier (where he later died) to Françoise Mathilde Sallard (1828–1892) and her husband Claude Antoine Théodore Chevalier (1813–1891), the latter being a lawyer and director of the pension Chevalier. In 1872 he entered the École polytechnique, leaving it two years later as 41st out of 207 (10th in the engineers cohort). In 1880 he became the youngest captain in the French Army.

=== Young officer ===
He studied at the École d'application de l'artillerie et du génie in Metz from 1 October 1874 to 1876, graduating as number 1 in his class of 42. He was made a lieutenant on 1 October 1876 and served in the 1st Engineer Regiment from 3 November 1876 to 29 November 1878. He was based at Fort de Villeras from 21 November 1877, moving to Versailles on 7 March 1878. He was promoted to captain on 24 October 1878 and served in Belfort from 19 November 1878 to 31 March 1882. From there he worked on fortifications, designing the enclosure around the suburbs during the completion of Fort du Salbert and Fort du Mont-Vaudois. He also took part in building barrack blocks, expanding the cavalry quarter and building the infantry barrack known as Front 3.4.

He served at the regimental school in Versailles from 1 April 1882 to 30 November 1885. Next he was in 4th direction, 2nd office, engineering war matériel at the Ministry of War (1 October 1885 – 2 November 1891). He studied fortifications, coastal defence and engineering materials. He then moved to Clermont-Ferrand (3 October 1891 – 12 August 1893), where he built an infantry barrack block and a shooting range in Riom. He was acting head of engineering for several months.

He was then chief of staff for the engineering centre of 6th Brigade under generals de la Taille and then Jolly in Chalons-sur-Marne (13 August 1893 – 6 October 1896). He was promoted to chef de bataillon on 26 February 1894 and was engineer chief of staff to général Jamont during army manoeuvres that year. He also carried out attack and defence manoeuvres at Verdun (July 1896) as engineer chief of staff for the attack. He then commanded the Engineering School in Versailles (7 October-31 December 1896).

=== Higher ranks ===
On 1 January 1897 he was made head of war matériel command at Versailles, also serving as permanent secretary to its Engineering Experimentation Commission. There he also studied and improvement engineers' field equipment and studied metal boats. He formed three trial crews before Joseph Joffre ordered him to organise the Engineering Experimentation Commission and the attack and defence plans for fortified positions.

Following very thorough trials on the Rhône at Avignon in 1901, the new metal boat was conclusively adopted and put into production – it would be the one used by the French Army during the First World War. On 10 February 1902 the Minister of War Louis André sent a letter congratulating Chevalier on the boats:

my attention has been drawn to the leading part you played in the work (preliminary studies, construction of test materials, experiments) carried out with a view to substituting metal boats for wooden boats in bridge teams and which resulted in the determination of the type of metal boat adopted on December 6 last. I am pleased to acknowledge the initiative, technical competence and activity you have demonstrated, as head of war materiel and as a member of the Engineering Studies Commission, in obtaining a solution that significantly increases the practical value of the bridge teams. I take this opportunity to express my particular satisfaction.

Also whilst at the Engineering Experimentation Commission, in October 1899, Chevalier prepared a code for engineers serving on campaign.

=== Nancy and the Ministry ===
Next he was chief engineer at Nancy (24 June 1901 – 27 July 1903). Whilst there he was promoted to lieutenant-colonel (1 October 1902). He led defensive works in Nancy (roads, bridge over the Meurthe, water supply) and the construction of new barracks and a major military hospital. His next posting was as head of the engineering matériel office at the Ministry of War (27 July 1903 – 14 November 1907), acting as the right-hand man Joffre, then director of engineering, collaborating closely with him.

He was put in charge of all work on barracks and fortifications in France and of all studies on and provision of engineering war matériel. He was promoted to colonel on 26 December 1906 before moving to Nice as assistant to the director of engineering on 26 November 1908. He was director of engineering until 30 September 1910 and during the interim led the engineers at Marseille (30 March-1 October 1908). There he studied and led defence works in the Alps.

He then returned to the Ministry of War, where he was made director of the 4th direction (engineering) from 8 November 1910 to 7 June 1917, replacing Pierre Auguste Roques. He was promoted to brigadier-general on 20 December 1910 and divisional general on 19 March 1914, putting him in supreme command of all engineer services and work (personnel, troops, railways in French Morocco, building barracks after the vote on the three-year law in June–October 1913).

=== First World War ===
As of 31 July 1914 the army had fewer than 900,000 men – ten days later 4,000,000 men were on the front line. This made Chevalier's role ever more important – 170,000 engineers were mobilised in what became a war of attrition reaching from Flanders to the Vosges. Until December 1916 he was almost a commander-in-chief, a man constantly trusted and relied upon. Immense amounts of matériel had to be supplied throughout the war – up to 150,000 grenades a day, the first tanks and chlorine poison gas, flamethrowers, barbed wire and chevaux de frise for trenches, stakes, logs, gratings, barracks, metal bridges and boat bridges.

Shortly after Joffre was dismissed in December 1916, Chevalier was made head of the War Wood Service on 6 April 1917, a post he held until 31 May 1919, supplying all the wood needed by the Allied troops. A few weeks later the first American troops landed in France under general John Pershing. Their needs were huge as their maximum strength was 2,000,000 men. Chevalier was able to respond promptly and his help was much appreciated by Pershing. He bought wood within France and overseas, making several important purchases of Swedish timber via M. Le Bourgeois, who represented the French Army in that country.

As part of his responsibilities, from 1915 onwards Chevalier joined with the mayor of Cérilly, Allier to organise military encampments with sawmills starting in the Tronçais forest and at Saint-Plaisir/Civrais, Saint-Pardoux, Chamignoux and Montaloyer, staffed by approximately 500 men (engineers and territorial troops, along with German and Polish prisoners).

He often resisted politicians when he considered their positions unacceptable but they still respected him as being absolutely principled. For example, Pierre Colliard, the Socialist deputy from Lyon, and Albert Thomas agreed that Chevalier would arbitrate their disagreement.

== Works ==
- Les bois d’œuvre pendant la guerre, Presses universitaires de France, 1927, 196 p
- He and Gabriel Angoulvant both contributed prefaces to André Bertin's Mission d'études forestières envoyée dans les colonies françaises par les ministères de la Guerre, de l'Armement et des Colonies.

== Honours ==
- Army Distinguished Service Medal, 1919, by General Pershing in the name of the US president.
- Officer of the Order of Public Education.
- Companion of the Order of the Bath
- Grand Officer of:
  - the Légion d’honneur, June 1930, ranking from 26 February 1921
  - Belgium's Order of the Crown
- Commander of :
  - the Order of St Michael and St George
  - Italy's Order of Saints Maurice and Lazarus
  - Serbia's Order of the White Eagle (with swords)
- Grand Cross of Tsarist Russia's Order of Saint Anna

== Bibliography ==
- Léon Pardé, « Recueil. Dossiers biographiques Boutillier du Retail. Documentation sur Georges Chevalier », Paris, Revue des eaux et forêts : Bulletin de l’École polytechnique, 1939
