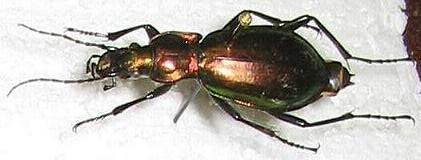

Scientific classification
- Kingdom: Animalia
- Phylum: Arthropoda
- Clade: Pancrustacea
- Class: Insecta
- Order: Coleoptera
- Suborder: Adephaga
- Family: Carabidae
- Genus: Carabus
- Subgenus: Chrysocarabus
- Species: C. splendens

Binomial name
- Carabus splendens Olivier, 1790

= Carabus splendens =

Species of beetle

Carabus splendens is a species of beetle endemic to Europe, where it is observed in mainland France and mainland Spain.
