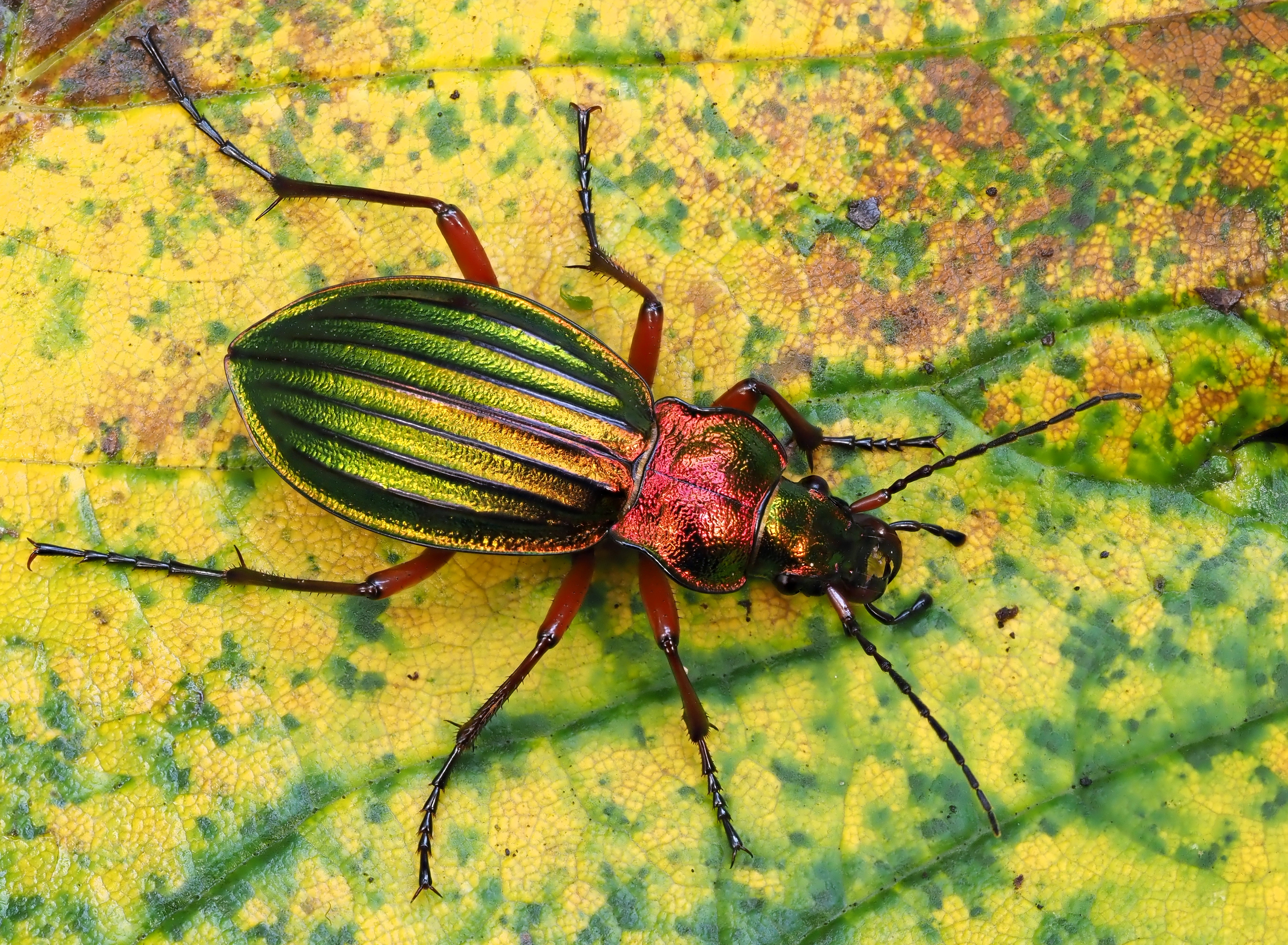

Scientific classification
- Kingdom: Animalia
- Phylum: Arthropoda
- Clade: Pancrustacea
- Class: Insecta
- Order: Coleoptera
- Suborder: Adephaga
- Family: Carabidae
- Genus: Carabus
- Subgenus: Chrysocarabus
- Species: C. auronitens

Binomial name
- Carabus auronitens Fabricius, 1792

Synonyms
- Chrysocarabus auronitens (Fabricius, 1792)

= Carabus auronitens =

Species of beetle

Carabus auronitens is a species of beetle in family Carabidae which was described by Johan Christian Fabricius in 1792.

== Subspecies ==
Subspecies include:

- Carabus auronitens auronitens Fabricius, 1792
- Carabus auronitens costellatus Géhin, 1882
- Carabus auronitens cupreonitens Chevrolat, 1861
- Carabus auronitens escheri Palliardi, 1825
- Carabus auronitens farinesi Dejean, 1826
- Carabus auronitens festivus Dejean, 1826
- Carabus auronitens intercostatus Gredler, 1854
- Carabus auronitens kraussi Lapouge, 1898
- Carabus auronitens montanus Géhin, 1882
- Carabus auronitens punctatoauratus Germar, 1824

== Description ==
This species grows to a size of 18–32 millimetres (0.71–1.26 in). The elytra and the head are shiny, with different colours: red golden, red green or more rarely blue. The prothorax is narrow at the base and reddish copper in colour. The colours are very variable from one specimen to another. Each elytron has a granular surface with three sturdy, dark longitudinal veins. The legs are black, except the femora, which are red. The antennae are also black but the first segments are red.

This species can be distinguished from Carabus auratus, a similar species, by its longitudinal veins and its antennae: Carabus auratus has green-gold veins and its first four antenna segments are red.

== Distribution and habitat ==
This species is found in central Europe, eastern Europe and western Europe. It is absent from northern Europe as well as south of the Pyrenees in western Europe. This species lives in humid, cool deciduous forests and mixed forests, and also in unwooded areas at high elevations. It can be found under loose bark or in dead wood, and also in bogs, especially in mountains or in foreland up to 2,500 metres (8,200 ft). In western Europe it is also found in plains.

== Life cycle ==
Adults appear from May to September. The imago is mainly nocturnal and predates on smaller animals such as snails, worms or insects. The larva climbs up trees to about 7 metres (23 ft) and pupates after three moults. Hatching occurs near the end of summer or the beginning of autumn. They then spend the winter under bark, in gaps in dead wood as well as in tree stubs and will be active the following year.

== Gallery ==
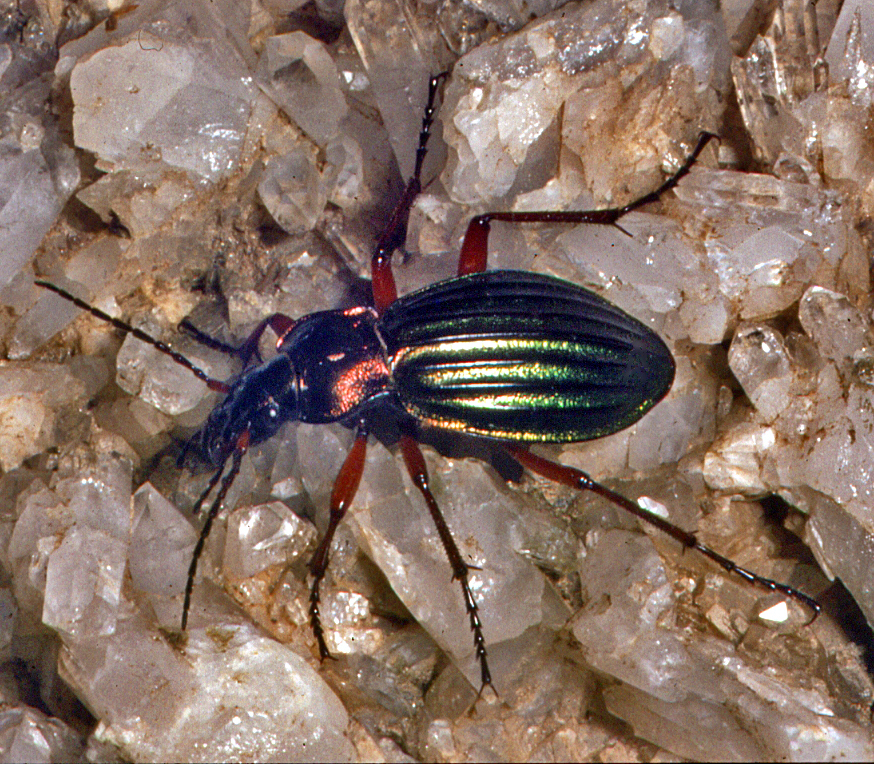
Carabus auronitens auronitens. Female

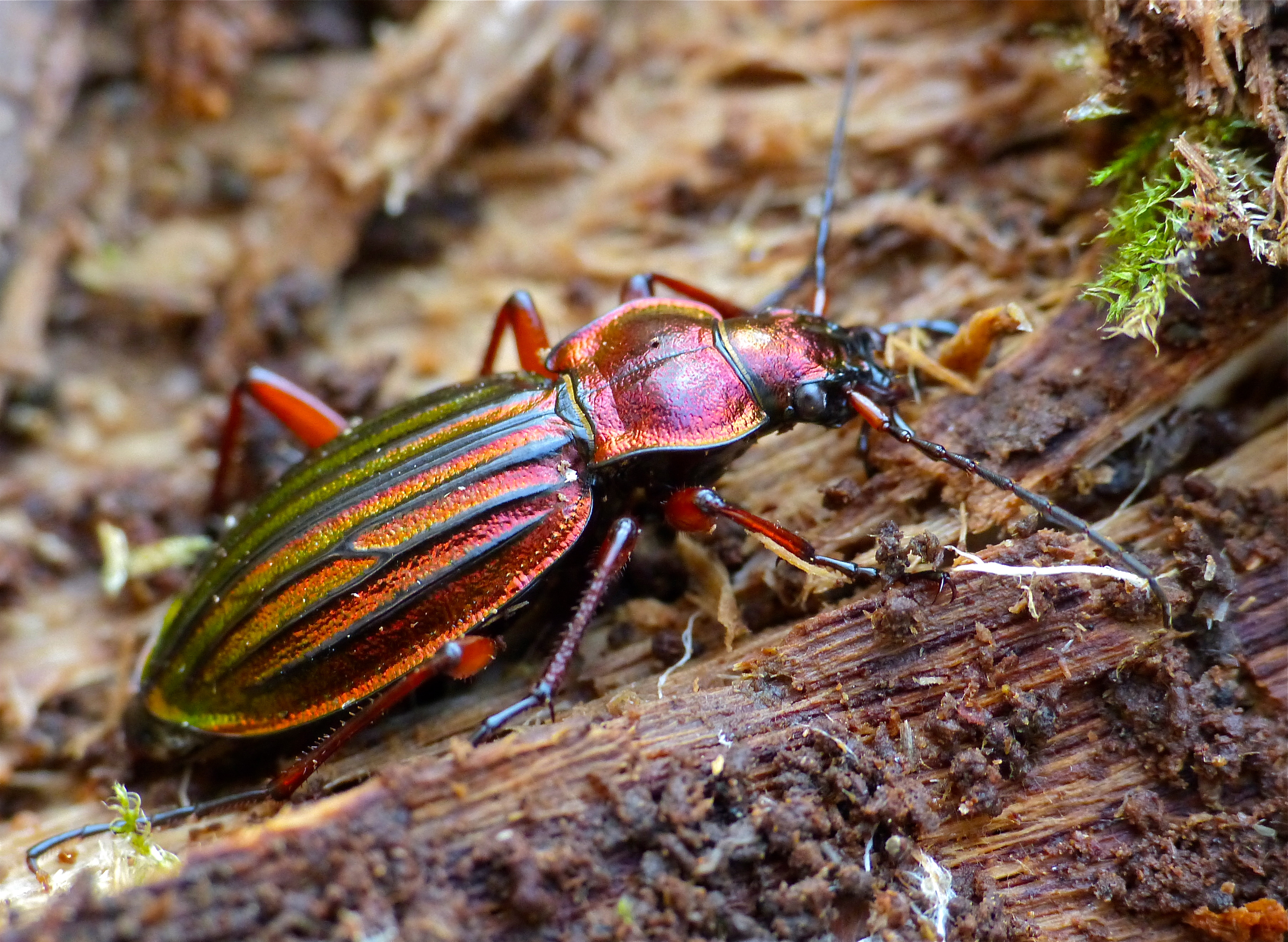
Carabus auronitens auronitens hibernating in dead wood

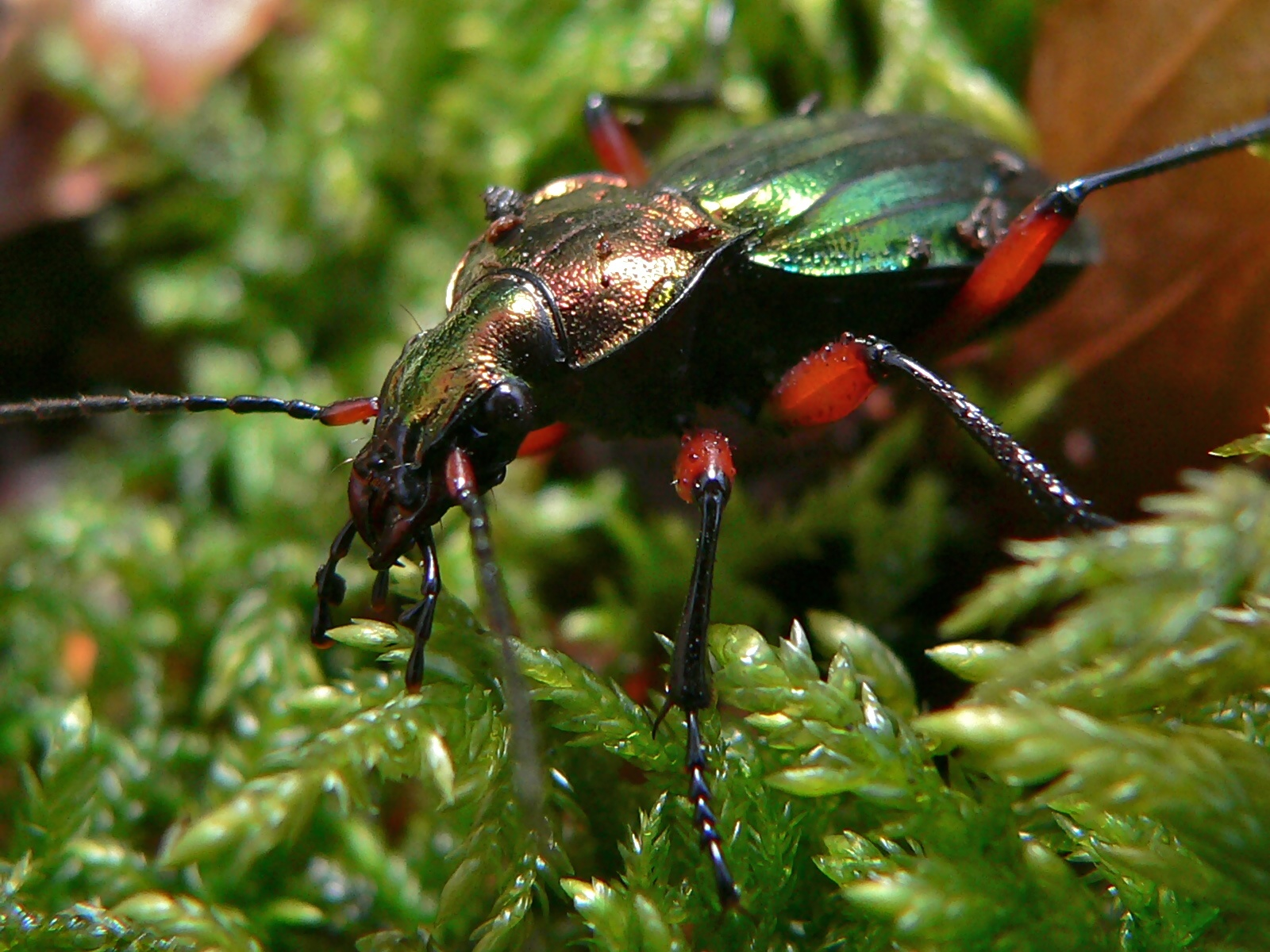
Carabus auronitens festivus

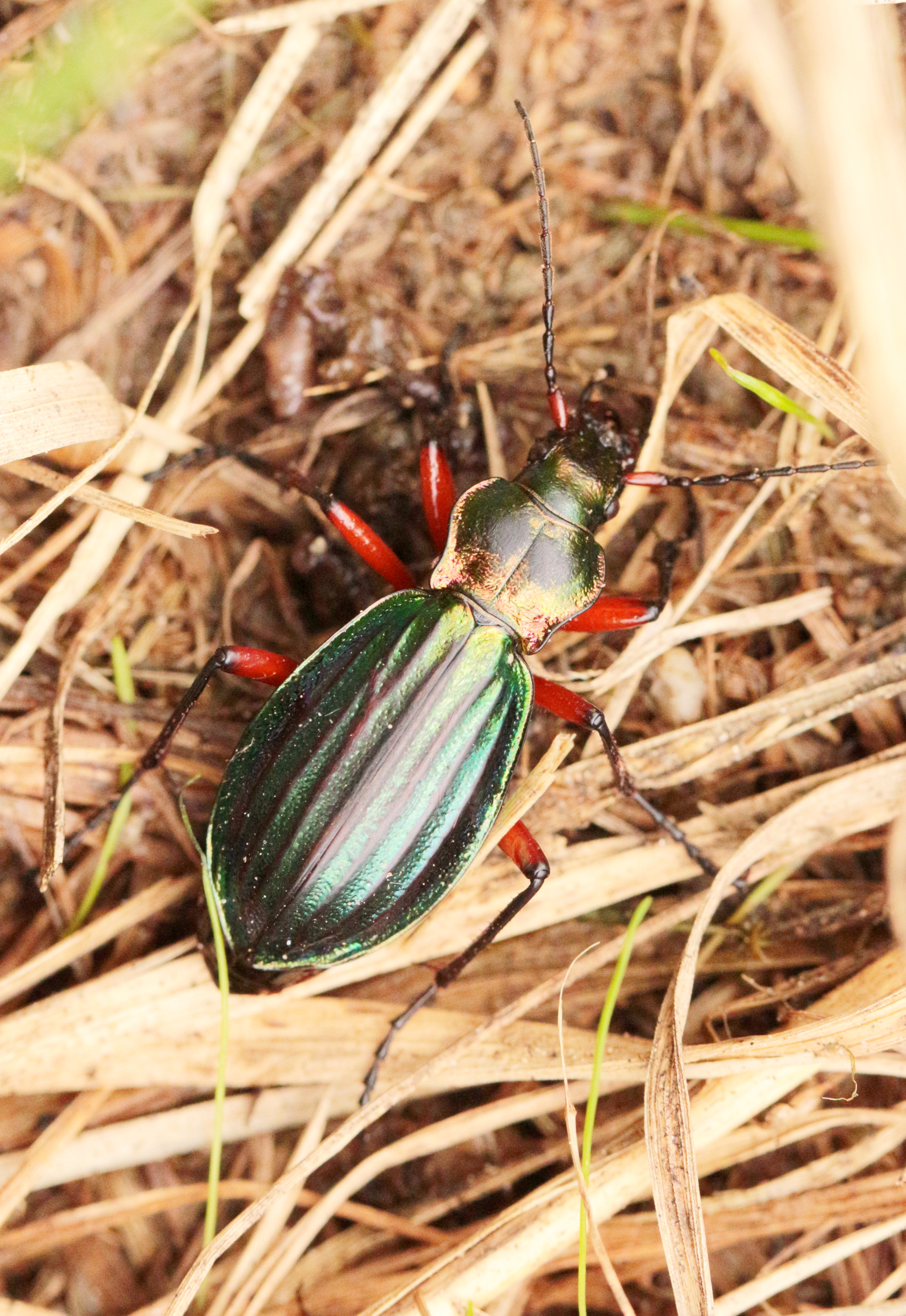
Carabus auronitens escheri
