= Édouard Jamont =

French general (1831–1918)

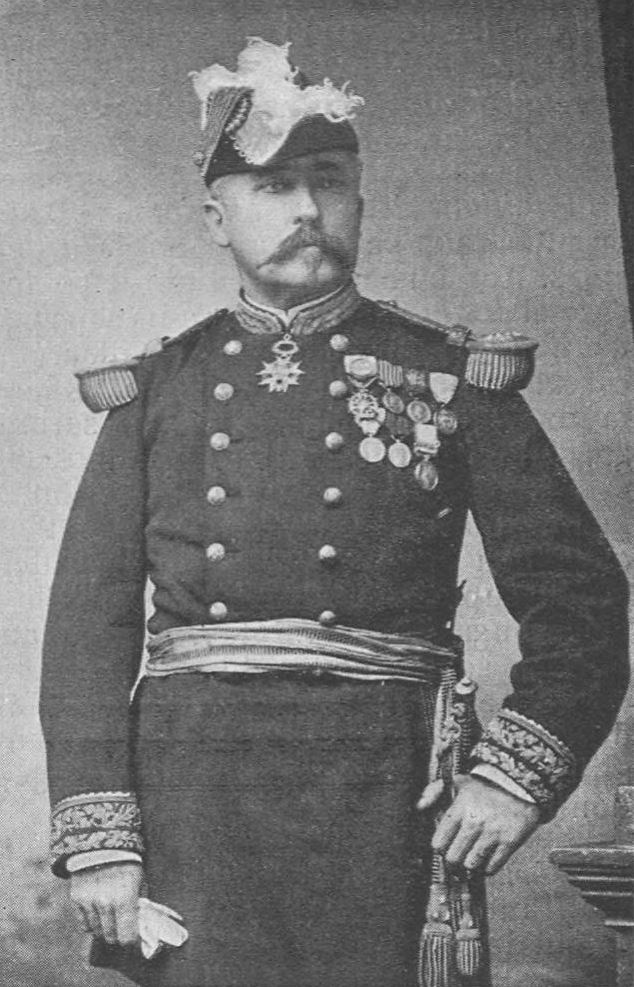

Édouard Jamont (19 July 1831 – 17 October 1918) was a French Army general. He was awarded the Grand Cross of the Legion of Honour and was awarded the Médaille militaire.

Graduating from the École polytechnique in 1852 then the École d'application de l'artillerie et du génie two years later, he fought in the Crimean War in 1855, the Italian campaign of 1859, the China and Cochinchina expeditions (1860–1862), the second French intervention in Mexico (1863–1867) and the Franco-Prussian War in 1870. He was captured at the Siege of Metz but freed the following year and attached to the French forces at Versailles. He was promoted to brigadier-general in 1880 and commanded the artillery in the Tonkin Expeditionary Corps (1885–1886). He was promoted to divisional general in October 1885 and returned to France the following year, commanding several army corps and from 1898 to 1900 as vice-president of the Conseil supérieur de la guerre.

== Life ==
=== Early life ===
He was born in Saint-Philbert-de-Grand-Lieu to Élise Tardiveau (daughter of François-Alexandre Tardiveau) and her husband Félix Jamont, owner of La Maillère and mayor of Saint-Philbert-de-Grandlieu (1832–1834). He studied at the École polytechnique (1850–1852) and École d'application de l'artillerie et du génie (1852–1854) before being made a lieutenant in the artillery in 1854.

== Bibliography (in French) ==
- Antoine Brébion, Dictionnaire de bio-bibliographie générale, ancienne et moderne de l'Indochine française, Paris, Société d'éditions géographiques, maritimes et coloniales, 1935, p. 203-204.
- Michel Wattel; Béatrice Wattel (2009). Les Grand’Croix de la Légion d’honneur: De 1805 à nos jours, titulaires français et étrangers (in French). Paris: Archives et Culture. p. 222. ISBN 978-2-35077-135-9..
- Gustave Vapereau, Dictionnaire universel des contemporains, supplément à la 6e édition, Paris, Hachette, 1895, p. 56.
