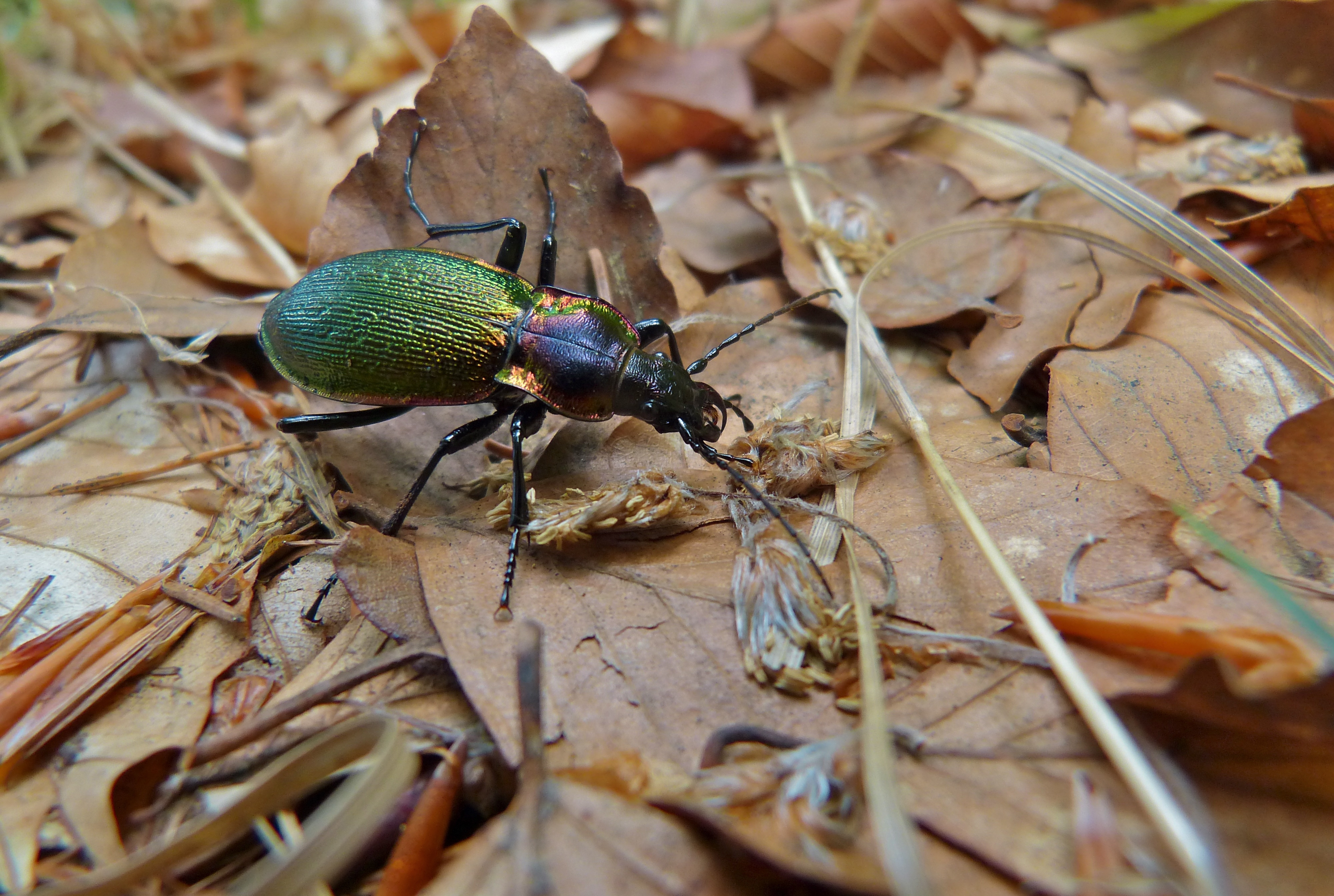

Conservation status
- Vulnerable (IUCN 2.3)

Scientific classification
- Kingdom: Animalia
- Phylum: Arthropoda
- Clade: Pancrustacea
- Class: Insecta
- Order: Coleoptera
- Suborder: Adephaga
- Family: Carabidae
- Genus: Carabus
- Subgenus: Chrysocarabus
- Species: C. olympiae

Binomial name
- Carabus olympiae Sella, 1855

= Carabus olympiae =

Species of beetle

Carabus olympiae is a species of beetle in the family Carabidae, that can be found in France and Italy. It is considered to be vulnerable on the IUCN scale.

The species is among the largest European species: its length ranges from 3 to 4 cm.

It has a metallic emerald green livery with iridescent and bluish reflections, sometimes with red shades.

This species is not able to fly due to its reduced wing length.

== Distribution ==
C. olympiae is a stenoendemic species whose restricted range lies almost entirely within the Val Sessera, in the Biellese Alps of Piedmont, northern Italy. It was first collected near Bocchetto Sessera in the summer of 1854 by Olimpia Sella, after whom it is named, and was described by Sella in 1855.

== Conservation ==
The species came close to extinction in the 1990s because of excessive collecting. Between 2012 and 2015 the EU-funded LIFE Carabus project (LIFE11 NAT/IT/000213) worked to define forest management practices in the upper Val Sessera that would increase and spread its population. The beetle is the emblem of the Oasi Zegna nature park.
