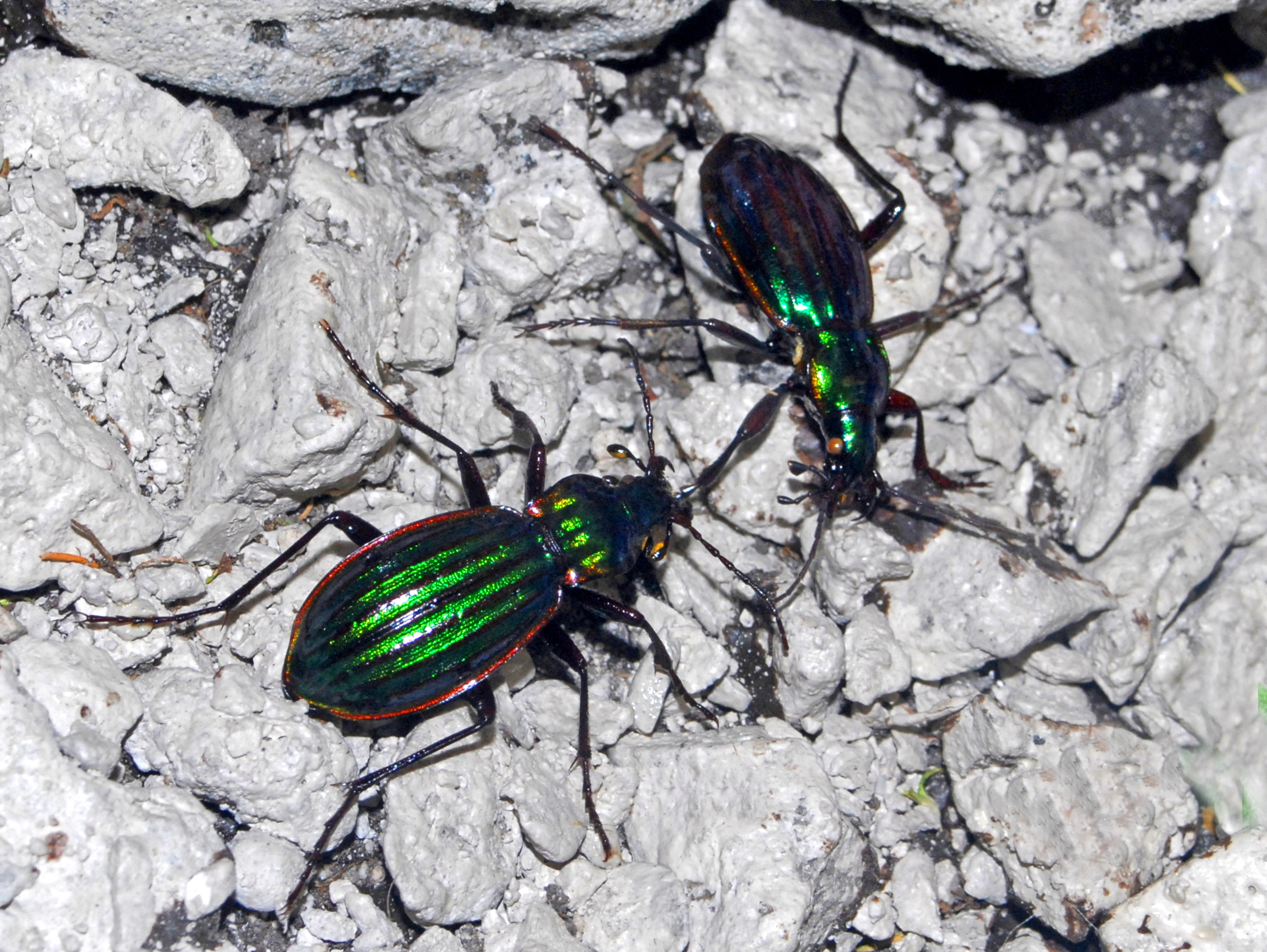

Scientific classification
- Kingdom: Animalia
- Phylum: Arthropoda
- Clade: Pancrustacea
- Class: Insecta
- Order: Coleoptera
- Suborder: Adephaga
- Family: Carabidae
- Genus: Carabus
- Subgenus: Chrysocarabus
- Species: C. solieri

Binomial name
- Carabus solieri Dejean, 1826

= Carabus solieri =

Species of beetle

Carabus solieri is a species of beetles of the family Carabidae.

== Description ==
Carabus solieri can reach about 25–40 millimetres (0.98–1.57 in) in length. The body is quite slender, metallic bright green, golden-green or green-coppery. Elytra are broad and robust, violet-red bordered and longitudinal crossed by ribs. This species mainly feeds on snails and it is crepuscular and nocturnal.

== Distribution ==
This species occurs in France and in Italy, especially in part of the Western Alps and in Apennines. It is present in the beech and chestnut forests with plenty of rotting leaves, at an elevation of about 100–2,500 metres (330–8,200 ft) above sea level.

== Subspecies ==
- Carabus solieri bonadonai Colas, 1948
- Carabus solieri bonnetianus Colas, 1936
- Carabus solieri clairi Géhin, 1885
- Carabus solieri liguranus Breuning, 1933
- Carabus solieri solieri Dejean, 1826
