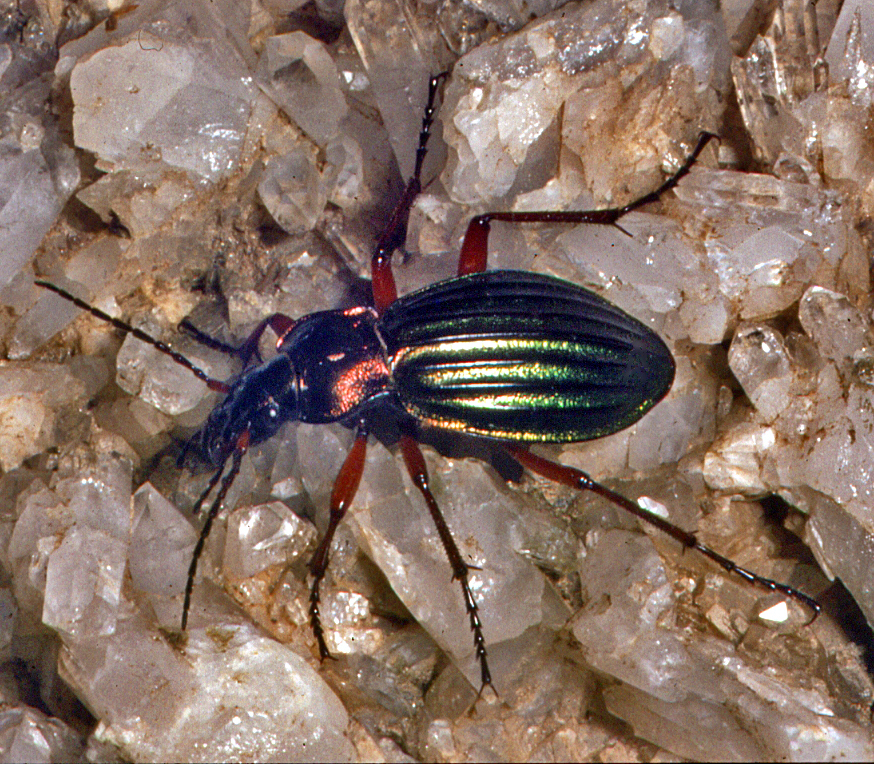
- Carabus auronitens

Scientific classification
- Kingdom: Animalia
- Phylum: Arthropoda
- Clade: Pancrustacea
- Class: Insecta
- Order: Coleoptera
- Suborder: Adephaga
- Family: Carabidae
- Genus: Carabus
- Subgenus: Chrysocarabus; C.G. Thomson, 1875

Synonyms
- Dysmictocarabus Puisségur, 1964; Sellaecarabus Sturani, 1947

= Chrysocarabus =

Subgenus of beetles

Chrysocarabus is a subgenus of beetle in family Carabidae.

== Species ==
Species within this subgenus include:

- Carabus auronitens Fabricius, 1792
- Carabus lineatus Dejean, 1826
- Carabus olympiae Sella, 1855
- Carabus solieri Dejean, 1826
- Carabus splendens Olivier, 1790
