= Vitray =

Commune in Allier, France

- Part of Meaulne-Vitray
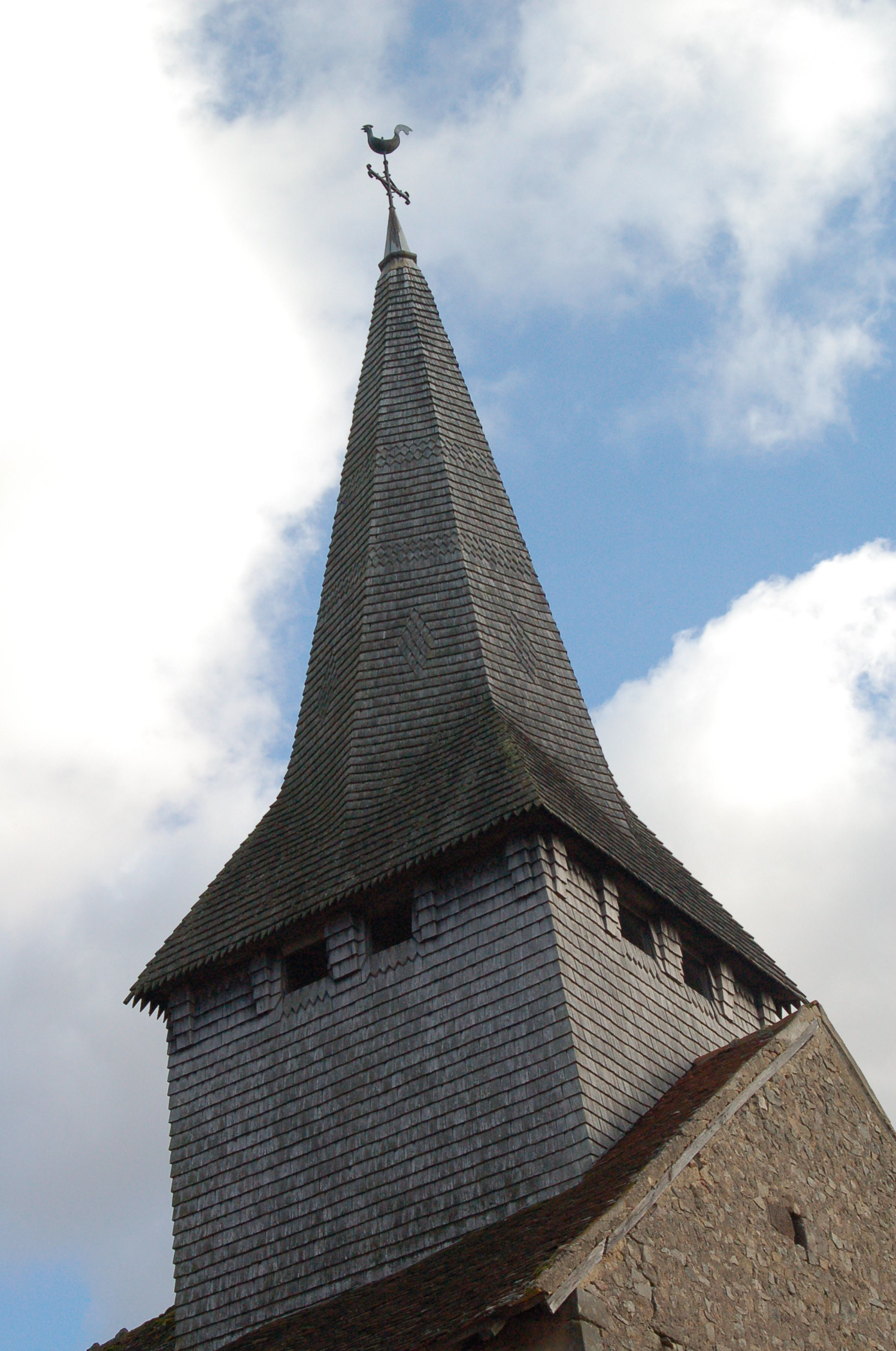
- The church tower in Vitray

- Coat of arms
- Location of Vitray
- Location within France Location within Auvergne-Rhône-Alpes
- Coordinates: 46°36′44″N 2°39′37″E
- Country: France
- Region: Auvergne-Rhône-Alpes
- Department: Allier
- Arrondissement: Montluçon
- Canton: Bourbon-l'Archambault
- Commune: Meaulne-Vitray
- Area^{1}: 29.03 km^{2} (11.21 sq mi)
- Elevation: 283 m (928 ft)
- Highest elevation: 312 m (1,024 ft)
- Lowest elevation: 194 m (636 ft)
- Population (2021): 134
  - Density: 4.62/km^{2} (12.0/sq mi)
- Time zone: UTC+01:00 (CET)
  - Summer (DST): UTC+02:00 (CEST)
- Postal code: 03360
- ^{1} French Land Register data, which excludes lakes, ponds, glaciers > 1 km^{2} (0.386 sq mi or 247 acres) and river estuaries.

Vitray (French pronunciation: [vitʁɛ]) is a former commune in the Allier department in Auvergne-Rhône-Alpes in central France. On 1 January 2017, it was merged into the new commune Meaulne-Vitray.

== See also ==
- Communes of the Allier department
