= Meaulne =

Commune in Allier, France

- Part of Meaulne-Vitray
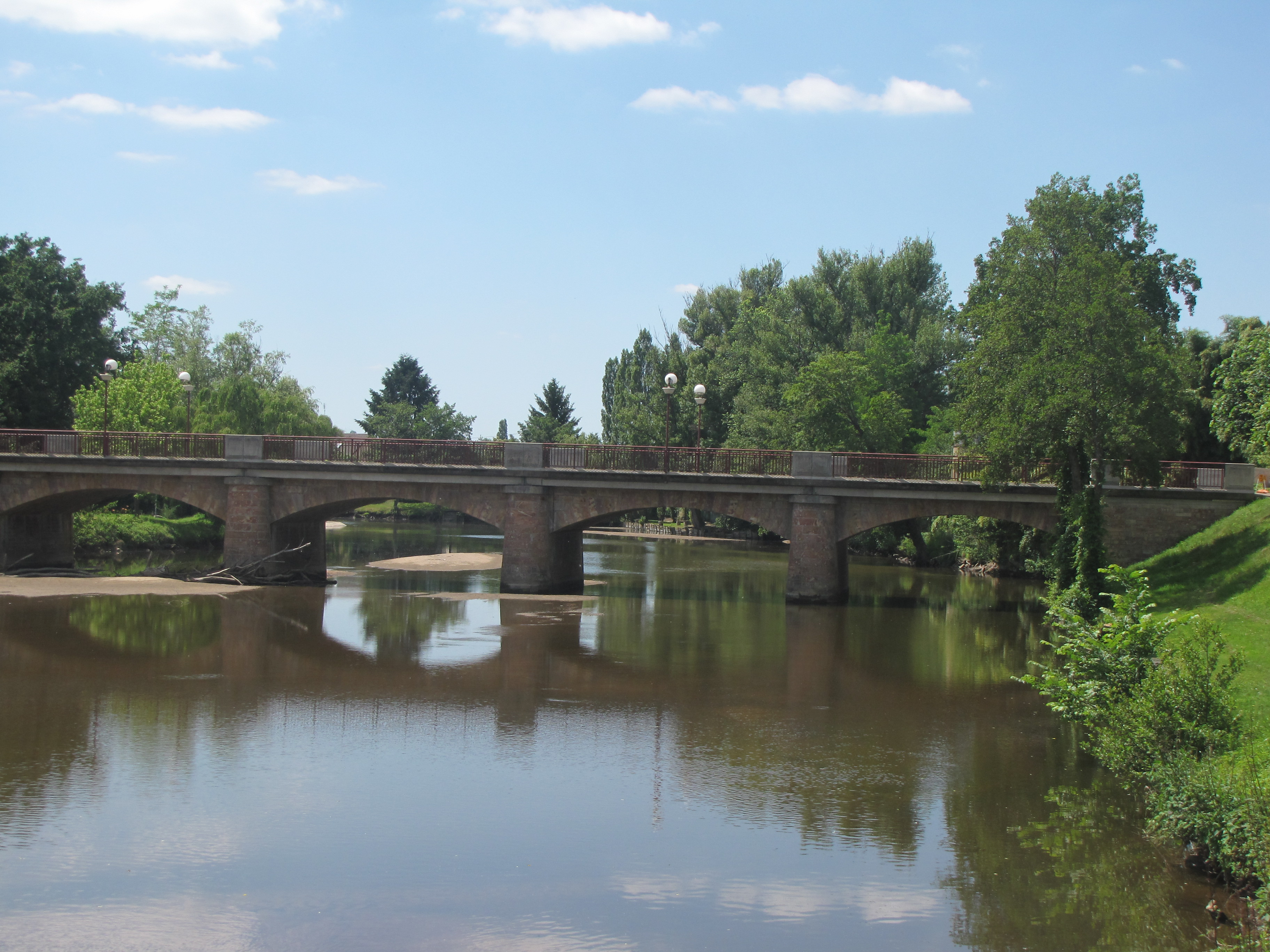
- The bridge over the Aumance, in Meaulne

- Coat of arms
- Location of Meaulne
- Location within France Location within Auvergne-Rhône-Alpes
- Coordinates: 46°35′57″N 2°36′57″E
- Country: France
- Region: Auvergne-Rhône-Alpes
- Department: Allier
- Arrondissement: Montluçon
- Canton: Bourbon-l'Archambault
- Commune: Meaulne-Vitray
- Area^{1}: 21.07 km^{2} (8.14 sq mi)
- Elevation: 207 m (679 ft)
- Highest elevation: 311 m (1,020 ft)
- Lowest elevation: 158 m (518 ft)
- Population (2021): 767
  - Density: 36.4/km^{2} (94.3/sq mi)
- Time zone: UTC+01:00 (CET)
  - Summer (DST): UTC+02:00 (CEST)
- Postal code: 03360
- ^{1} French Land Register data, which excludes lakes, ponds, glaciers > 1 km^{2} (0.386 sq mi or 247 acres) and river estuaries.

Meaulne (French pronunciation: [mo(l)n]) is a former commune in the Allier department in central France. On 1 January 2017, it was merged into the new commune Meaulne-Vitray.

== See also ==
- Communes of the Allier department
