= Jacques Chevalier =

French Catholic philosopher and politician

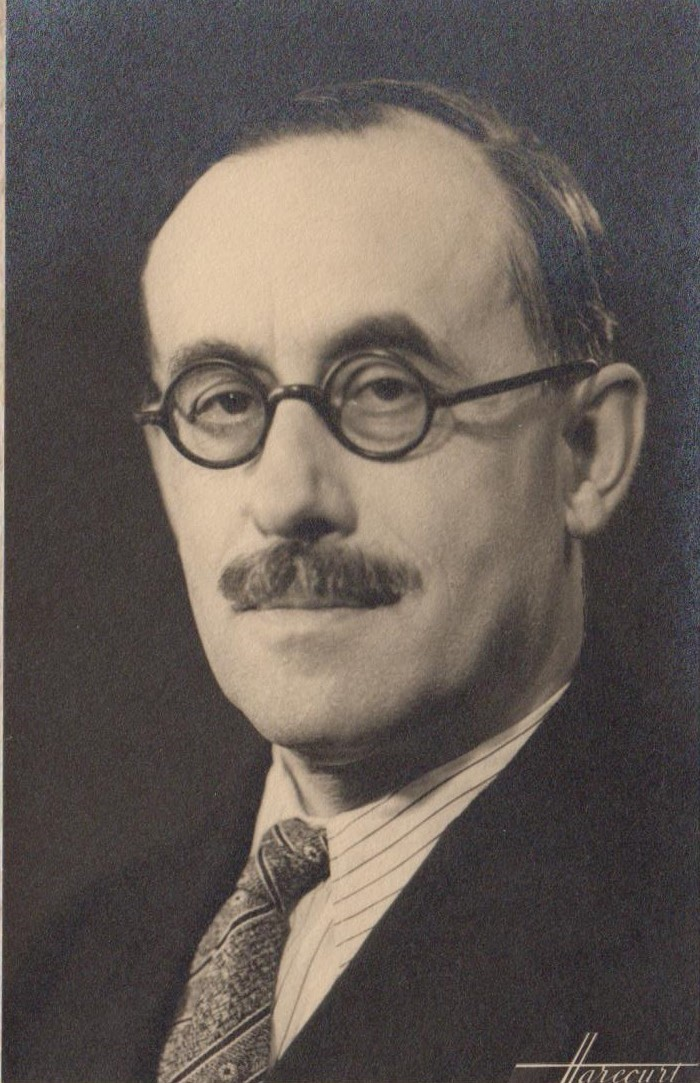

French Minister of Education
- In office 1941–1942

Personal details
- Born: 13 March 1882 Cérilly, Allier, France
- Died: 19 April 1962 (aged 80) Cérilly, Allier, France
- Parent: Georges Chevalier (father)

Academic background
- Education: École normale supérieure University of Oxford
- Academic advisor: Henri Bergson

Academic work
- Discipline: Philosophy
- School or tradition: French spiritualism
- Institutions: University of Grenoble
- Notable students: Emmanuel Mounier
- Main interests: Plato

Jacques Chevalier (French: [ʒak ʃəvalje]; 13 March 1882 – 19 April 1962) was a French Catholic philosopher and a politician. He was a proponent of French spiritualism.

== Biography ==
Chevalier was born in Cérilly, Allier to army engineer Georges Chevalier, educated at the École normale supérieure and the University of Oxford and taught at the Faculty of Letters at the University of Grenoble. He was a specialist of Plato and author of many books, mainly about the history of philosophy.

A friend of Lord Halifax, he was also a Minister for Education in 1941 under the Vichy Regime, and was as such the only member of the government to be present at the funeral of the philosopher Henri Bergson.

A devout Catholic, he attempted to eradicate the anti-religious feeling in educational circles and consequently closed the "Écoles Normales", which had been created in each "département" by the François Guizot law of 1833 to prepare teachers for elementary classes, replacing them with "Instituts de formation professionnelle". The anti-clerical Collaborationists opposed him, however, and he had to step down (he was replaced by the historian Jérôme Carcopino); his reform was eventually abolished and the "Écoles Normales" were recreated.

== Sources ==
- Jeanne Dubois, Deux architectes pour reconstruire la France : Frédéric Mistral et Jacques Chevalier, Avignon, Les Livres Nouveaux, 1941.
