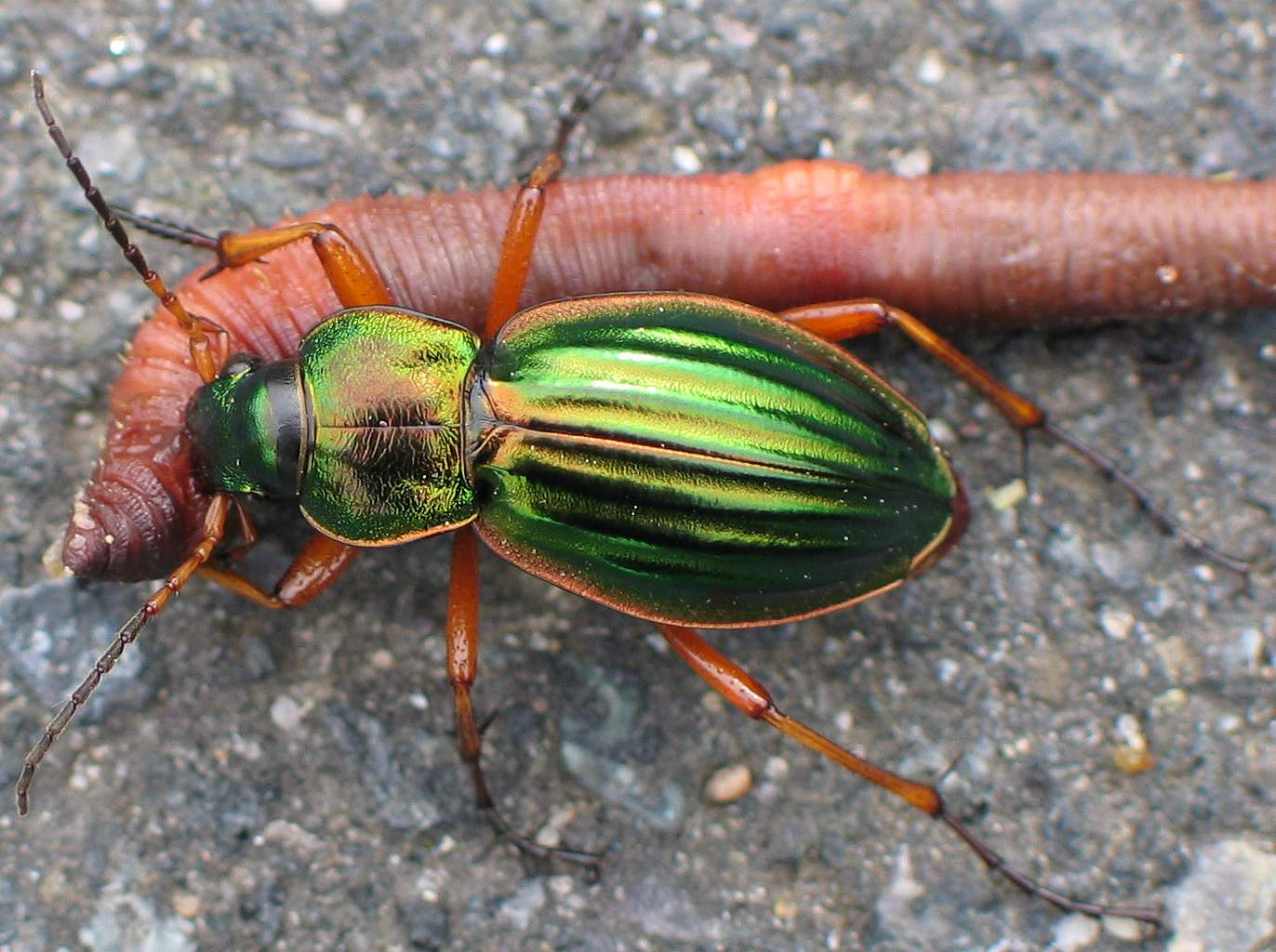
- Carabus auratus with prey

Scientific classification
- Kingdom: Animalia
- Phylum: Arthropoda
- Class: Insecta
- Order: Coleoptera
- Suborder: Adephaga
- Family: Carabidae
- Genus: Carabus
- Species: C. auratus

Binomial name
- Carabus auratus Linnaeus, 1761

Synonyms
- Carabus (Tachypus) altavesubiensis Rataj, 2006; Carabus margaritae Hecq, 1996; Carabus isignyensis Machard, 1977; Autocarabus concyri Machard, 1973; Carabus plonnieri Machard, 1973; Carabus rivalieri Bourgin, 1948; Carabus clementi Sirguey, 1931; Carabus clermonti Sirguey, 1931; Carabus meyeri Sirguey, 1931; Carabus dufouranus Csiki, 1927; Carabus nigricatus Csiki, 1927; Carabus rutilipes Csiki, 1927; Carabus hilairei Gavoy, 1925; Carabus navarricus Lapouge, 1925; Carabus barthei Lebis, 1924; Carabus anthracinus Barthe, 1921; Carabus bettingeri Barthe, 1921; Carabus brunieri Barthe, 1921; Carabus dufouri Barthe, 1921; Carabus erythropus Barthe, 1921; Carabus perviridis Born, 1915; Carabus confluentinus Bocklet, 1904; Carabus labittei Clement, 1904; Carabus laticollaris Bocklet, 1904; Carabus quadricostatus Bocklet, 1904; Carabus sulcatissimus Lapouge, 1898; Carabus auratoides Reitter, 1896; Carabus perauratus Reitter, 1896; Carabus rotundatus Born, 1895; Carabus worleei Beuthin, 1894; Carabus brullei Géhin, 1885; Carabus catalaunicus Géhin, 1885; Carabus obscuricornis Beuthin, 1885; Carabus nigripes Dalla Torre, 1877; Carabus opacoviridis Dalla Torre, 1877; Carabus viridiauratus Dalla Torre, 1877; Carabus laniarius Gistel, 1857; Carabus coeruleomicans Letzner, 1850; Carabus contortus Letzner, 1850; Carabus picipes Letzner, 1850; Carabus sulcatus DeGeer, 1774; Carabus (Tachypus) piolitensis Thelot & Thelot, 2019; Carabus altissimus Rataj, 1999; Carabus camardi Darnaud, 1995; Carabus astridae Fiévet, 1991; Carabus ignescens Darnaud, 1983; Carabus blayeulensis Machard, 1977; Carabus grimonensis Machard, 1977; Carabus lardierensis Machard, 1977; Carabus lurensis Machard, 1977; Carabus malcorensis Machard, 1977; Carabus seirinensis Machard, 1977; Carabus diensis Tarrier, 1975; Carabus aufreri Colas, 1964; Carabus fabrei Colas, 1962; Carabus vadoni Colas, 1962; Carabus nicolasianus Csiki, 1927; Carabus olivarius A.Nicolas, 1919; Carabus baeri Bleuse, 1914; Carabus diversicolor Bleuse, 1914; Carabus hnicolasi Chobaut, 1908; Carabus ventouxensis A.Nicolas, 1904; Carabus nicolasi Chobaut, 1897; Carabus atripes Géhin, 1885; Carabus tronqueti Peslier, 2007; Carabus agoutensis Bidault & Camard, 2003; Carabus mazametensis Prunier, 1999; Carabus rabili Raynaud, 1971; Autocarabus carouxensis Schaefer, 1969; Autocarabus millavensis Schaefer, 1969; Autocarabus mouriesi Schaefer, 1969; Carabus ligericinulus Mandl, 1955; Carabus taranicus Cleu, 1952; Carabus ruthenus Lapouge, 1924; Carabus pseudolotharingus Barthe, 1921; Carabus ispaniacus A.Nicolas, 1919; Carabus magdelainei Bleuse, 1914; Carabus ruthenus Barthe, 1908; Carabus sudresi Lapouge, 1898; Carabus ligericinus Fairmaire, 1886; Autocarabus avenionensis Schaefer, 1973; Autocarabus sambucensis Schaefer, 1973; Autocarabus billieriensis Schaefer, 1969; Autocarabus larzacensis Schaefer, 1969; Autocarabus mourguesi Schaefer, 1969; Autocarabus virenquensis Schaefer, 1969; Carabus gangensis Schaefer, 1964; Carabus incognitus Bourgin, 1953; Carabus puisseguri Bourgin, 1953; Carabus transiens Cleu, 1952; Carabus monspessulanus Lapouge, 1898; Carabus siculus Ragusa, 1881

= Carabus auratus =

Species of beetle

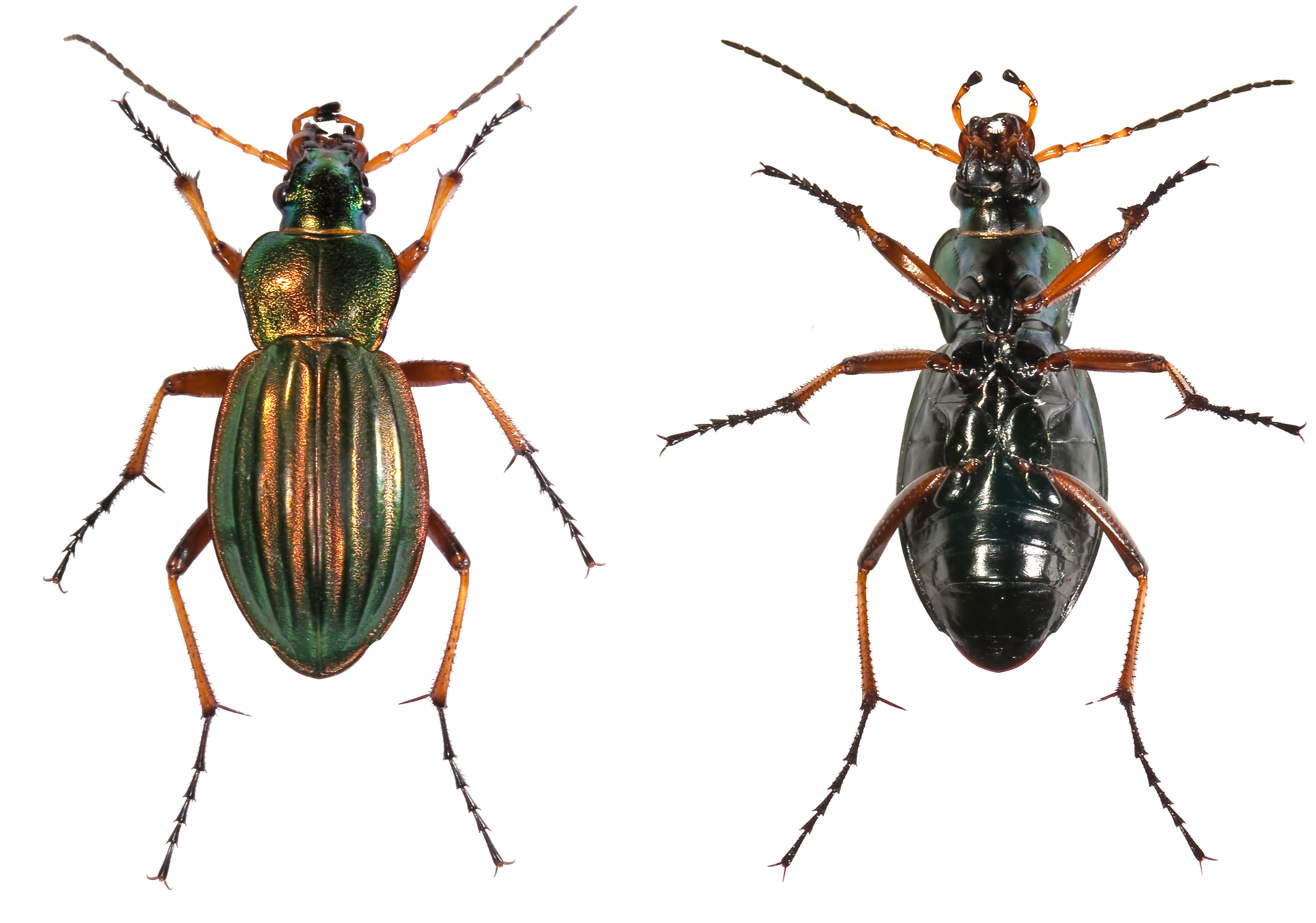
Carabus auratus

Carabus auratus, the golden ground beetle, is a species of ground beetle in the genus Carabus. This species is native to central and western Europe and has been introduced into North America.

== Description ==
The flightless beetle reaches a body length between 1.7 and 2.0 cm. The elytra, each marked with three broad longitudinal grooves, are an iridescent gold-green colour, as are the head and thorax. The legs, antennae and mouth parts are orange.

C. auratus is found in fields and amongst bushes, particularly on loamy soil. On occasion, it climbs into trees. Active during the day, it preys upon insects, snails, and worms, which it seizes with its mandibles and sprays with a digestive secretion before consuming it. C. auratus can be welcome to farmers and gardeners, as it feeds upon pests such as the Colorado potato beetle.

The larvae hunt only at dawn. They moult three times before pupating in the soil and then emerging as adults in the autumn. The beetles' life expectancy is around two years; they overwinter under the shelter of stones or moss.

== Subspecies ==
- Carabus auratus auratus Linnaeus, 1761 (Great Britain, Denmark, Sweden, France, Belgium, Netherlands, Germany, Switzerland, Austria, Czechia, Poland, Spain, USA)
- Carabus auratus honnoratii Dejean, 1826 (France)
- Carabus auratus lasserrei Doué, 1855 (France)
- Carabus auratus lotharingus Dejean, 1826 (France)
