= École d'application de l'artillerie et du génie =

Military training establishment

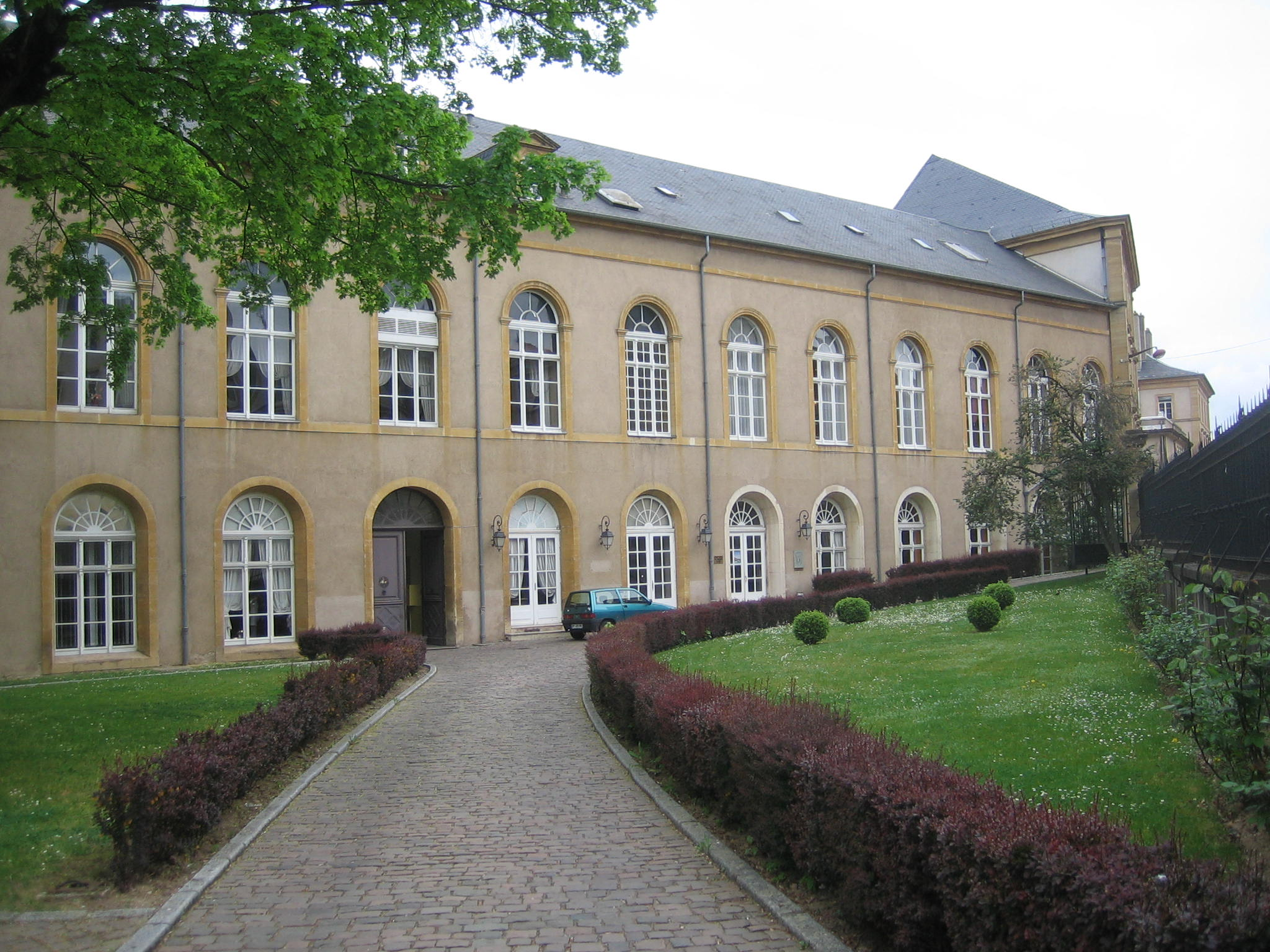

The École d’application de l’artillerie et du génie was a military training establishment in France under the aegis of the École polytechnique. It was established in Metz in 1802 by Napoleon whilst he was First Consul by merging the ancien regime engineering school in Metz with the artillery school in Châlons sur Marne. After the Franco-Prussian War in 1870 and Germany's annexation of Alsace-Lorraine it moved to Fontainebleau.

== History ==
In 1794 the Committee of Public Safety moved the existing engineering school from Mézières to Metz, using the buildings of the former Abbey of Saint-Arnould, which had been seized by the state. In 1802 Napoleon decided to merge that school with the artillery school which had been operating in Châlons since 1791. he also decided to convert the resulting institution into an 'école d'application', with the privilege of admission to the École polytechnique. A two-year course trained artillery- and engineer-officers, who after graduating joined the army at the rank of lieutenant.

After the Franco-Prussian War the school moved to Fontainebleau and its old buildings housed the Prussian 'Kriegsschule Metz', which taught the best-known generals in the Imperial German Army until closing after the Treaty of Versailles. In Fontainebleau the artillery school became a separate institution again in 1912, with engineer officer training moving to Versailles. The façade of the building that housed the former royal artillery school was made a monument historique on 25 May 1929.

== Famous graduates ==
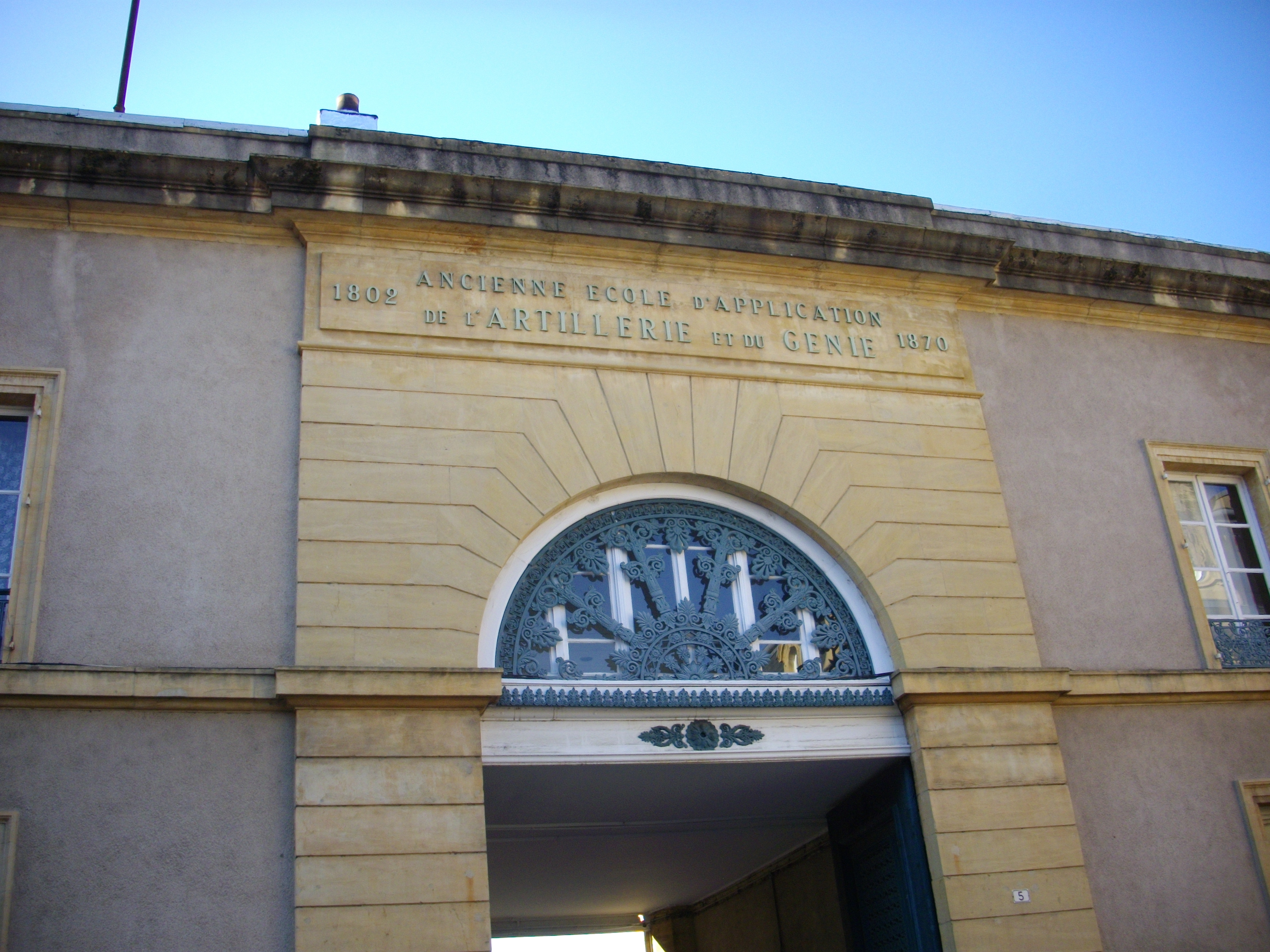
Gateway into the École d'application de l'artillerie et du génie.

== Notable commandants and directors ==
- Basile Guy Marie Victor Baltus de Pouilly (1766–1845), commandant (1815), brigadier general under the French First Empire
- Guillaume Boivin de La Martinière (1745–1820), made commandant on 4 frimaire, year XI.
- Emmanuel d'Astier de La Vigerie (1845–1915), engineer at the Polytechnique (1864), commandant of the École.
- Jean-Baptiste Duchand de Sancey, made director of the École in 1831.
- Mardochée Valabrègue, made commandant of the École in 1902.

== Bibliography (in French) ==
- Philippe Hoch, L’École d’artillerie et du génie, fleuron des armes savantes à Metz, Armes savantes, Metz, 1993 (p. 7-36).
- P. Chalmin: L’École de Metz, Revue historique de l’armée, No. 3., 1962.
- Georges Ducrocq: L’École d’application de Metz, Austrasie, 1908-1909 (p. 151-173).
- Maurice Dumontier : École du génie de Metz (1794-1802). École d’application de l’artillerie et du génie de Metz (1802-1870). - Nancy, 1957.
- Maurice Dumontier : École du Génie de Metz (1794-1802). - P.L., 1961, 2, (p. 49-58).
- Maurice Dumontier : L’École d’application de l’artillerie et du génie à Metz, sous la seconde république et le second empire. – P.L., 1961, 4 (p. 122-135).
- Maurice Dumontier : L’École d’artillerie et du Génie de Metz sous l’Empire, la Restauration et la Monarchie de Juillet (1803-1845). P.L., 1961, 3 (p. 86-102).
- Maurice Dumontier : École du génie de Metz (1794-1802). École d’application de l’artillerie et du génie de Metz (1802-1870). - Nancy, 1957.
- Goetschy (général): Les derniers jours de l’École d’application de Metz, in Revue du Génie militaire, 1933.
- Théodore Le Puillon de Boblay: Esquisse historique sur les Écoles d’artillerie, pour servir à l’histoire de l’École d’application de l’artillerie et du génie, RousseauPallez, Metz, 1858.
- Pierre PHILIPPE : Les rapports de l’Académie Nationale de Metz et de l’école d’application de l’artillerie et du génie sous la restauration, in M.A.M., 1976–1977, (p. 3-18).
- Reversat: L'École d’application de l’artillerie et du génie à Metz, in Bulletin du Génie militaire, 1964 (p. 5-37).
