= Saint-Christophe-en-Bourbonnais =

- Commune
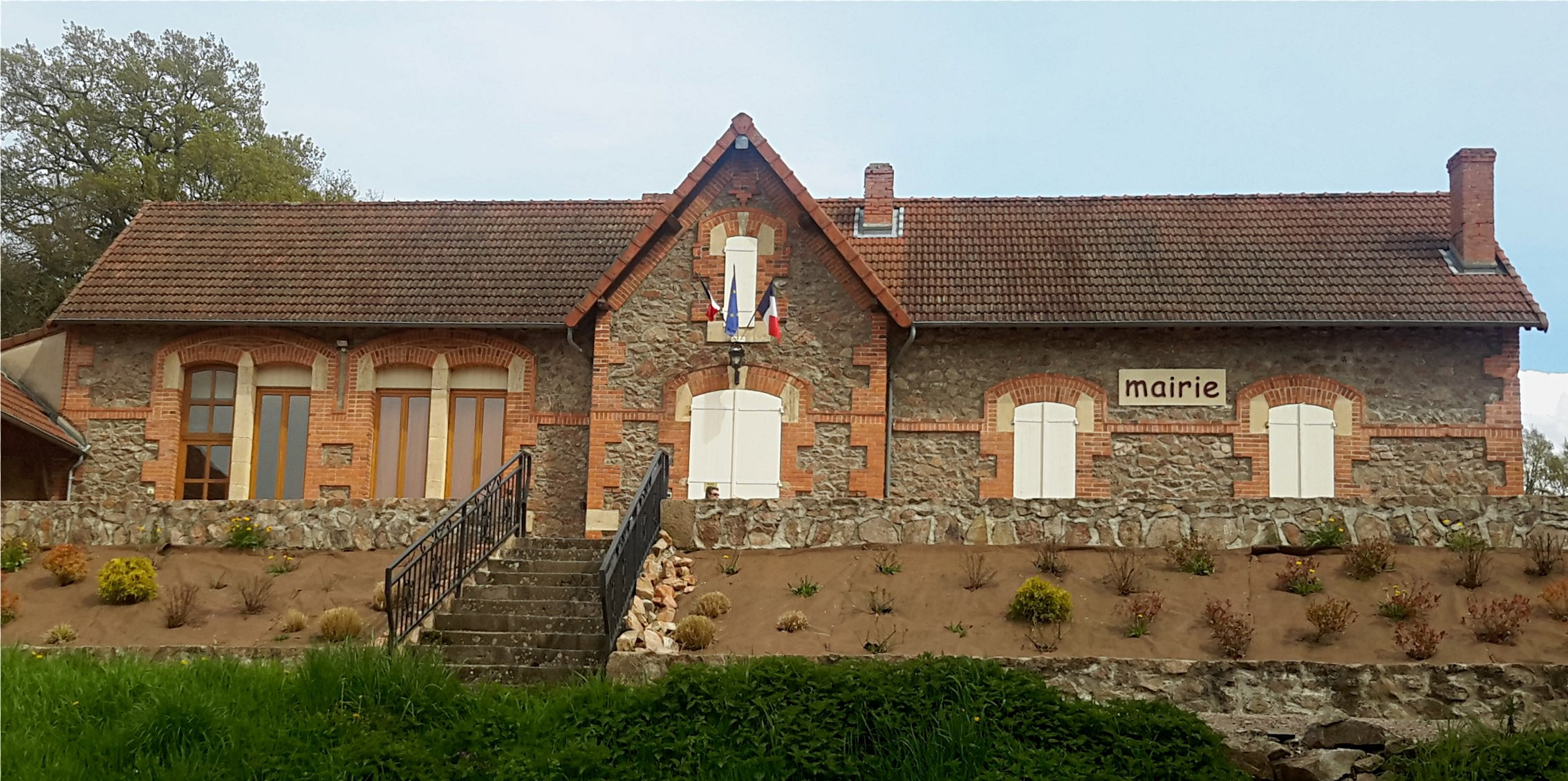
- Town hall

- Coat of arms
- Location of Saint-Christophe-en-Bourbonnais
- Location within France Location within Auvergne-Rhône-Alpes
- Coordinates: 46°10′03″N 3°34′35″E
- Country: France
- Region: Auvergne-Rhône-Alpes
- Department: Allier
- Arrondissement: Vichy
- Canton: Lapalisse
- Intercommunality: Pays de Lapalisse

Government
  - Mayor (2026–32): Marie Da Riva
- Area^{1}: 28.02 km^{2} (10.82 sq mi)
- Elevation: 350 m (1,150 ft)
- Highest elevation: 471 m (1,545 ft)
- Lowest elevation: 305 m (1,001 ft)
- Population (2023): 442
  - Density: 15.8/km^{2} (40.9/sq mi)
- Demonym: Christophais
- Time zone: UTC+01:00 (CET)
  - Summer (DST): UTC+02:00 (CEST)
- INSEE/Postal code: 03223 /03120
- ^{1} French Land Register data, which excludes lakes, ponds, glaciers > 1 km^{2} (0.386 sq mi or 247 acres) and river estuaries.

Saint-Christophe-en-Bourbonnais (French pronunciation: [sɛ̃ kʁistɔf ɑ̃ buʁbɔnɛ], lit. 'Saint-Christophe in Bourbonnais'; known as Saint-Christophe until 31 December 2022; Occitan: Sant Cristòu) is a commune in the Allier department in Auvergne-Rhône-Alpes in central France.

== Geography ==
Saint-Christophe-en-Bourbonnais is surrounded by the communes of Billezois, Saint-Prix, Le Breuil, Isserpent, Molles, and Saint-Étienne-de-Vicq. Saint-Christophe-en-Bourbonnais lies about 16 kilometres (9.9 mi) from Vichy.

The south of the commune is rolling hills and valleys, whereas the north is flatter and more favorable to agriculture. Le Mourgon, the principal stream of the commune is 18 km long and separates these two parts.

== Population ==
Its inhabitants are called Christophais in French.

Historical population
Year	Pop.	±% p.a.
1968	589	—
1975	489	−2.62%
1982	480	−0.27%
1990	475	−0.13%
1999	481	+0.14%
2007	453	−0.75%
2012	491	+1.62%
2017	466	−1.04%
2023	442	−0.88%
Source: INSEE

== Sights ==
- Bruyères Reservoir, known for its fly fishing.
- Two 19th-century churches.

== See also ==
- Communes of the Allier department
