= Arfeuilles =

- Commune
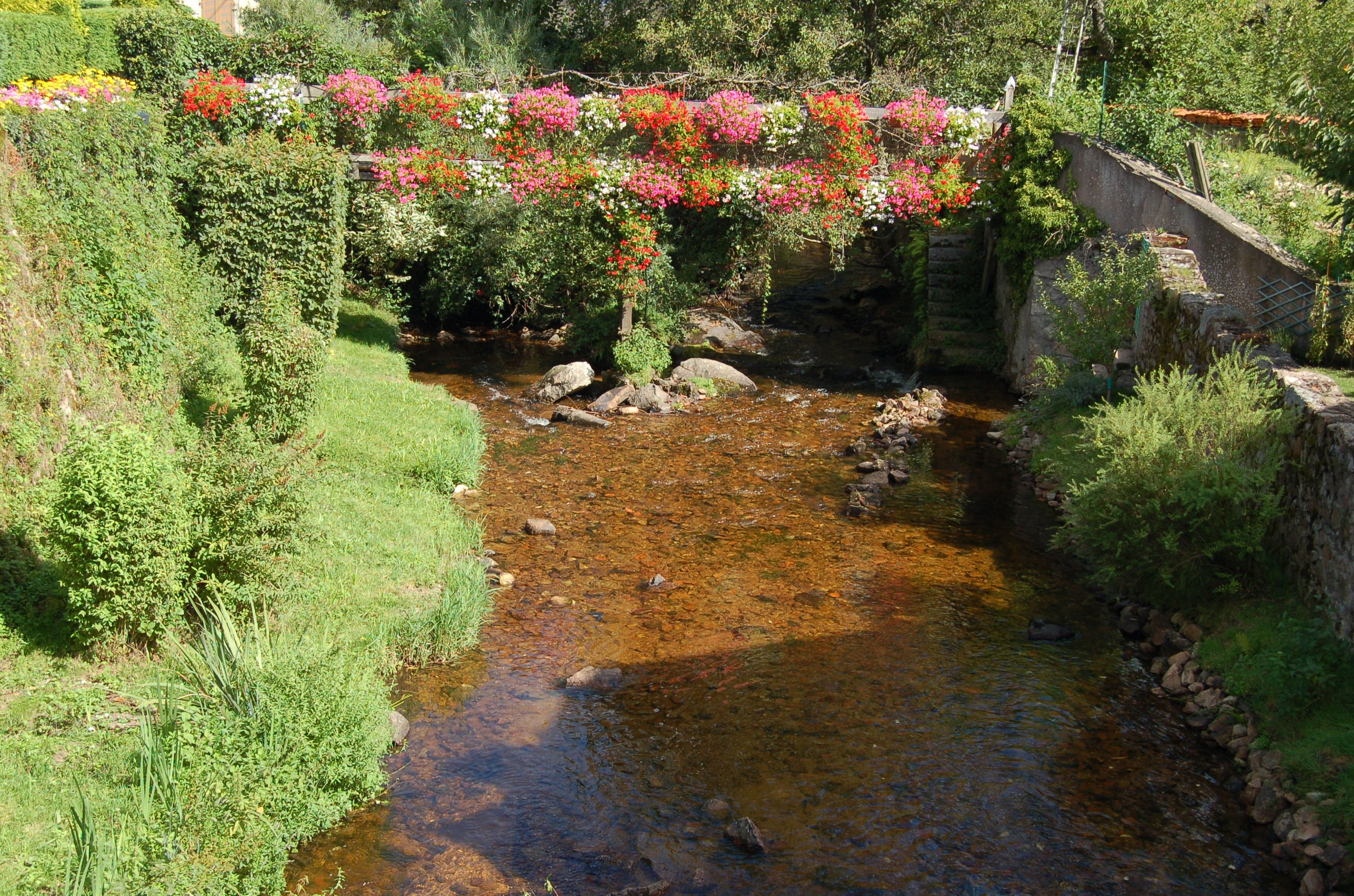
- The Barbenan at Arfeuilles

- Coat of arms
- Location of Arfeuilles
- Location within France Location within Auvergne-Rhône-Alpes
- Coordinates: 46°09′25″N 3°43′42″E
- Country: France
- Region: Auvergne-Rhône-Alpes
- Department: Allier
- Arrondissement: Vichy
- Canton: Lapalisse
- Intercommunality: CA Vichy Communauté

Government
  - Mayor (2026–32): Michel Guicherd
- Area^{1}: 59.56 km^{2} (23.00 sq mi)
- Elevation: 420 m (1,380 ft)
- Highest elevation: 795 m (2,608 ft)
- Lowest elevation: 335 m (1,099 ft)
- Population (2023): 594
  - Density: 9.97/km^{2} (25.8/sq mi)
- Time zone: UTC+01:00 (CET)
  - Summer (DST): UTC+02:00 (CEST)
- INSEE/Postal code: 03006 /03120
- ^{1} French Land Register data, which excludes lakes, ponds, glaciers > 1 km^{2} (0.386 sq mi or 247 acres) and river estuaries.

Arfeuilles (French pronunciation: [aʁfœj]; Occitan: Arfuelha) is a commune in the Allier department in the Auvergne-Rhône-Alpes region of central France.

The inhabitants of the commune are known as Arfeuillats or Arfeuillates in French.

The commune has been awarded one flower by the National Council of Towns and Villages in Bloom in the Competition of cities and villages in Bloom.

== Geography ==
Arfeuilles is located in the foothills of the Madeleine mountains some 25 kilometres (16 mi) east of Vichy and 30 kilometres (19 mi) north-west of Roanne. It is part of the Canton of Lapalisse with an area of almost 60 square kilometres (23 sq mi). The village is at an altitude of 424 metres (1,391 ft) and is surrounded by a network of hills of which the highest is 795 metres (2,608 ft) belonging to the "Montagne Bourbonnaise". To the south it is bordered by the Côte roannaise, to the east and west are the Mountains of Forez. To the north the heights fall towards the plains of Lapalisse.

Access to the commune is by the D207 road from Saint-Pierre-Laval in the north-east passing through the village and continuing south-west to Châtel-Montagne. The D26 links the village to the N2007 (really D707) in the north-west which links to the N7 National Highway and also continues south-east to the hamlet of Les Biefs on the south-eastern border of the commune. The D471 goes from the village to Le Breuil in the north-west. The commune is equally mixed forest and farmland.

The Barbenan river flows from the south of the commune through its length past the village and continuing north-west to join the Besbre, a tributary of the Loire, at Le Breuil.

== History ==
=== From The Middle Ages to the French Revolution ===
In feudal times Arfeuilles was a small village where some of the priests from the priory of Châtel-Montagne had built the old Arfeuilles Church (demolished in the 19th century and replaced by the present church). The inhabitants lived under the protection of a Squire of Arfeuilles, Hugues d'Arfoglia, vassal of the Count of Forez. In 1310, after a local conflict with the lord of Montmorillon (?) the fief fell into the hands of the conqueror: the noble family of Châtel-Montagne. Arfeuilles was incorporated into the province of Bourbonnais and dependent on the Chatellery of Vichy as Montmorillon Châtel-Montagne. The Wars of religion led to the destruction of the old castle and manor house built next to the church in 1600.

The 17th and 18th centuries saw a significant increase in the population of Arfeuilles and in the commercial development of the commune. In the villages, the hemp industry provided an important contribution to farms which typically had a hemp field. It was also a source of work for hemp combers, sergers, sewers, and weavers.

=== Rural organization from the 17th to the 18th centuries ===
In the traditional rural societies families lived together under one roof grouped in communities to cope with difficulties and dangers of all kinds. They worked on an undivided heritage of land passed down from generation to generation. This family and collective way of life was common in the Bourbonnais Mountains until the 19th century when it then disappeared with the application of the Napoleonic Code which did not recognize this type of association. The community was structured around a community leader, called "the Master", who managed common interests and had real moral authority over the group. Members of the community were called "parsonniers" and each had a share of the communal heritage. In general, the community gave its name to the village or locality where it was installed.

In the Arfeuilles region several communities have been identified from available state records although there is no written contract of association.

Arfeuilles: Rural Communities
Name of village	Name of community	Head of community or Master
Verger	Duvergier	Georges Duvergier (~1673, 1730)
Géranton	Géranton	Louis Cote (~1655, 1735)
Morel	Morel	Claude Morel (~1600, ?)
Vignaud	Vignaud	Anthoine Despalles (1622, ?)

=== The revolutionary period ===
During the French Revolution, with the new territorial organization set up by the National Constituent Assembly of 1789, the territory of Arfeuilles was attached to the department of Allier in the district of Cusset.

Early political and social measures taken by the Constituent Assembly did not create particular agitation in Arfeuilles, the population was preoccupied with poor harvests and famine. It was not the same, however, with the Civil Constitution of the Clergy voted on 12 July 1790. The nomination and appointment of constitutional priests, the jurors, the confiscation of the rights of the parish enraged the population and started a virtual local war. Arfeuilles was not spared by the Terror as Jacques Forestier, president of the cantonal parliament of Arfeuilles and a raging Montagnard of the convention, cracked down.

The town was the chief town of a canton at the beginning of the Revolution.

=== Heraldry ===
Arms of Arfeuilles	Blazon: Azure, a fleur-de-lis of Or between 3 mullets the same.

== Administration ==
List of Successive Mayors

From	To	Name
1977	2008	Jacques Bardet
2008	2022	Jacques Terracol
2022	Present	Michel Guicherd

== Population ==
Historical population
Year	Pop.	±% p.a.
1968	1,288	—
1975	1,004	−3.50%
1982	881	−1.85%
1990	843	−0.55%
1999	710	−1.89%
2007	688	−0.39%
2012	668	−0.59%
2017	648	−0.61%
2023	594	−1.44%
Source: INSEE

== Economy ==
Until the 19th century, Arfeuilles was a prosperous commune with agriculture as the main activity. Workshops carding wool, spinning, making Serge, and cloth were installed in the vicinity of the town. Along the river Barbenan over 14 grain mills, oil presses, and sawmills were recorded in the land registry of 1829.

With rugged terrain and fragmented and dispersed rural farms, agriculture was poorly suited to agricultural mechanization and land gave way gradually to reforestation. The nearest railway station was more than seven kilometres from the village near the National Highway N7 so Arfeuilles did not benefit from the opening up of road and rail in the 19th century. The consequences were a gradual decline in activity and demographic change. Currently, a second breath of air has been brought to the region through the development of green tourism.

== Sites and Monuments ==
- The Church of Saint-Germain in the neo-Gothic style replaced the old church. It was built between 1854 and 1870. It retains a Holy water font from the 12th century. There is also a Reliquary (17th century) which is registered as an historical object.
- The Pisserotte Waterfall.
- The Chapel of Saint Francis contains a Group Sculpture: Virgin of Pity (16th century) which is registered as an historical object.

== See also ==
- Communes of the Allier department

== Bibliography ==
- Lucienne Vallery, History of Arfeuilles in Bourbonnais, Saint-Étienne, éditions Dumas, 1963. (in French)
