= Canton of Cusset-Sud =

Coordinates: 46°08′07″N 3°27′26″E

Cusset-Sud
- Former canton
- Interactive map of Cusset-Sud
- Country: France
- Region: Auvergne-Rhône-Alpes
- Department: Allier
- No. of communes: {{{nbcomm}}}
- Disbanded: 2015
- Population (2012): 14,976

Cusset-Sud was a canton of the arrondissement of Vichy, Allier, Auvergne, France. It had 14,976 inhabitants (2012).

== History ==
The canton was created in 1985 by scission of canton of Cusset. It includes 7 communes (list below) and fraction of Cusset.

The canton has been disbanded in March 2015 due to French departmental elections.

== Administration ==
- 1985–1998: René Copet (craftsman, mayor of Abrest — unknown dates)
- 1998–2015: Gérard Charasse (mayor of Le Vernet, 1977–2001)

== Communes ==
The canton consisted of the following communes:

- Abrest
- Busset
- Cusset (partly)
- La Chapelle, Allier
- Le Vernet, Allier
- Mariol
- Molles
- Saint-Yorre

== See also ==
- Cantons of the Allier department
