= Arrondissement of Vichy =

Coordinates: 46°07′46″N 3°25′23″E

Vichy
- Arrondissement
- Location within the department Allier
- Country: France
- Region: Auvergne-Rhône-Alpes
- Department: Allier
- No. of communes: {{{nbcomm}}}
- Area: 3,151.2 km^{2} (1,216.7 sq mi)
- Population (2023): 152,816
  - Density: 48.495/km^{2} (125.60/sq mi)
- INSEE code: 033

The arrondissement of Vichy is an arrondissement of France in the Allier department in the Auvergne-Rhône-Alpes region. It has 160 communes. Its population is 153,276 (2021), and its area is 3,151.2 km^{2} (1,216.7 sq mi).

== Composition ==
The communes of the arrondissement of Vichy, and their INSEE codes are:

1. Abrest (03001)
2. Andelaroche (03004)
3. Arfeuilles (03006)
4. Arronnes (03008)
5. Avrilly (03014)
6. Barberier (03016)
7. Barrais-Bussolles (03017)
8. Bayet (03018)
9. Beaulon (03019)
10. Bègues (03021)
11. Bellenaves (03022)
12. Bellerive-sur-Allier (03023)
13. Bert (03024)
14. Billezois (03028)
15. Billy (03029)
16. Biozat (03030)
17. Bost (03033)
18. Boucé (03034)
19. Le Bouchaud (03035)
20. Bransat (03038)
21. Le Breuil (03042)
22. Broût-Vernet (03043)
23. Brugheas (03044)
24. Busset (03045)
25. Cesset (03049)
26. La Chabanne (03050)
27. Chantelle (03053)
28. La Chapelle (03056)
29. Chareil-Cintrat (03059)
30. Charmeil (03060)
31. Charmes (03061)
32. Charroux (03062)
33. Chassenard (03063)
34. Châtel-Montagne (03066)
35. Châtelperron (03067)
36. Châtelus (03068)
37. Chavroches (03071)
38. Chezelle (03075)
39. Chirat-l'Église (03077)
40. Chouvigny (03078)
41. Cindré (03079)
42. Cognat-Lyonne (03080)
43. Contigny (03083)
44. Coulanges (03086)
45. Coutansouze (03089)
46. Créchy (03091)
47. Creuzier-le-Neuf (03093)
48. Creuzier-le-Vieux (03094)
49. Cusset (03095)
50. Deneuille-lès-Chantelle (03096)
51. Diou (03100)
52. Dompierre-sur-Besbre (03102)
53. Le Donjon (03103)
54. Droiturier (03105)
55. Ébreuil (03107)
56. Échassières (03108)
57. Escurolles (03109)
58. Espinasse-Vozelle (03110)
59. Étroussat (03112)
60. Ferrières-sur-Sichon (03113)
61. La Ferté-Hauterive (03114)
62. Fleuriel (03115)
63. Fourilles (03116)
64. Gannat (03118)
65. La Guillermie (03125)
66. Hauterive (03126)
67. Isserpent (03131)
68. Jaligny-sur-Besbre (03132)
69. Jenzat (03133)
70. Laféline (03134)
71. Lalizolle (03135)
72. Langy (03137)
73. Lapalisse (03138)
74. Laprugne (03139)
75. Lavoine (03141)
76. Lenax (03142)
77. Liernolles (03144)
78. Loddes (03147)
79. Loriges (03148)
80. Louchy-Montfand (03149)
81. Louroux-de-Bouble (03152)
82. Luneau (03154)
83. Magnet (03157)
84. Marcenat (03160)
85. Mariol (03163)
86. Le Mayet-d'École (03164)
87. Le Mayet-de-Montagne (03165)
88. Mazerier (03166)
89. Mercy (03171)
90. Molinet (03173)
91. Molles (03174)
92. Monestier (03175)
93. Monétay-sur-Allier (03176)
94. Monétay-sur-Loire (03177)
95. Montaiguët-en-Forez (03178)
96. Montaigu-le-Blin (03179)
97. Montcombroux-les-Mines (03181)
98. Monteignet-sur-l'Andelot (03182)
99. Montoldre (03187)
100. Montord (03188)
101. Nades (03192)
102. Naves (03194)
103. Neuilly-en-Donjon (03196)
104. Nizerolles (03201)
105. Paray-sous-Briailles (03204)
106. Périgny (03205)
107. Pierrefitte-sur-Loire (03207)
108. Le Pin (03208)
109. Poëzat (03209)
110. Rongères (03215)
111. Saint-Bonnet-de-Rochefort (03220)
112. Saint-Christophe-en-Bourbonnais (03223)
113. Saint-Clément (03224)
114. Saint-Didier-en-Donjon (03226)
115. Saint-Didier-la-Forêt (03227)
116. Saint-Étienne-de-Vicq (03230)
117. Saint-Félix (03232)
118. Saint-Gérand-de-Vaux (03234)
119. Saint-Gérand-le-Puy (03235)
120. Saint-Germain-de-Salles (03237)
121. Saint-Germain-des-Fossés (03236)
122. Saint-Léger-sur-Vouzance (03239)
123. Saint-Léon (03240)
124. Saint-Loup (03242)
125. Saint-Nicolas-des-Biefs (03248)
126. Saint-Pierre-Laval (03250)
127. Saint-Pont (03252)
128. Saint-Pourçain-sur-Besbre (03253)
129. Saint-Pourçain-sur-Sioule (03254)
130. Saint-Priest-d'Andelot (03255)
131. Saint-Prix (03257)
132. Saint-Rémy-en-Rollat (03258)
133. Saint-Voir (03263)
134. Saint-Yorre (03264)
135. Saligny-sur-Roudon (03265)
136. Sanssat (03266)
137. Saulcet (03267)
138. Saulzet (03268)
139. Serbannes (03271)
140. Servilly (03272)
141. Seuillet (03273)
142. Sorbier (03274)
143. Sussat (03276)
144. Target (03277)
145. Taxat-Senat (03278)
146. Le Theil (03281)
147. Thionne (03284)
148. Treteau (03289)
149. Trézelles (03291)
150. Ussel-d'Allier (03294)
151. Valignat (03295)
152. Varennes-sur-Allier (03298)
153. Varennes-sur-Tèche (03299)
154. Vaumas (03300)
155. Veauce (03302)
156. Vendat (03304)
157. Le Vernet (03306)
158. Verneuil-en-Bourbonnais (03307)
159. Vichy (03310)
160. Vicq (03311)

== History ==
The arrondissement of Lapalisse was created in 1800. The subprefecture was moved to Vichy in 1941. At the January 2017 reorganization of the arrondissements of Allier, it gained 14 communes from the arrondissement of Montluçon and three communes from the arrondissement of Moulins, and it lost one commune to the arrondissement of Moulins. At the January 2024 reorganization of the arrondissements of Allier, it gained 41 communes from the arrondissement of Moulins.

As a result of the reorganisation of the cantons of France which came into effect in 2015, the borders of the cantons are no longer related to the borders of the arrondissements. The cantons of the arrondissement of Vichy were, as of January 2015:

1. Cusset-Nord
2. Cusset-Sud
3. Le Donjon
4. Escurolles
5. Gannat
6. Jaligny-sur-Besbre
7. Lapalisse
8. Le Mayet-de-Montagne
9. Varennes-sur-Allier
10. Vichy-Nord
11. Vichy-Sud
