= Arronnes =

- Commune
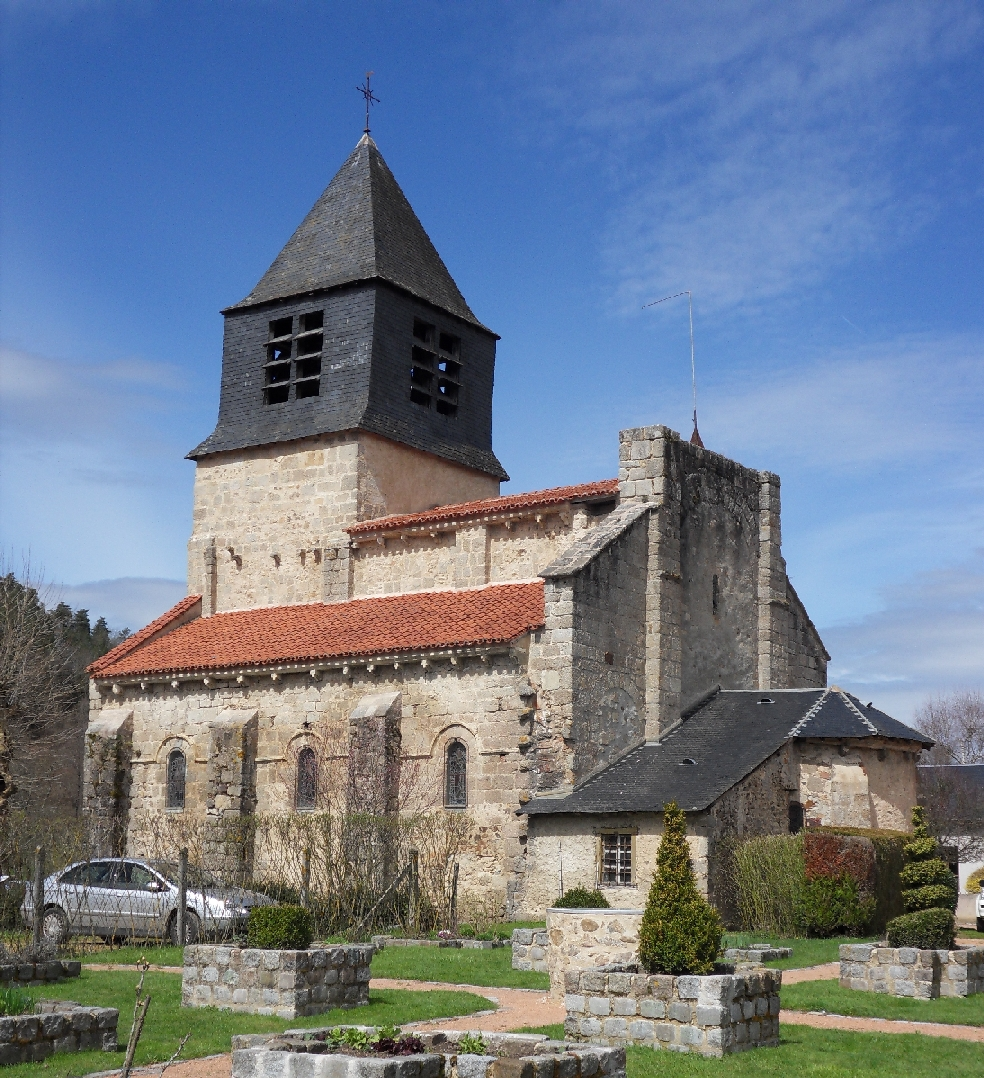
- Church of St-Léger at Arronnes

- Coat of arms
- Location of Arronnes
- Location within France Location within Auvergne-Rhône-Alpes
- Coordinates: 46°03′32″N 3°34′10″E
- Country: France
- Region: Auvergne-Rhône-Alpes
- Department: Allier
- Arrondissement: Vichy
- Canton: Lapalisse
- Intercommunality: CA Vichy Communauté

Government
  - Mayor (2026–32): Emmanuelle Roux
- Area^{1}: 26 km^{2} (10 sq mi)
- Elevation: 300 m (980 ft)
- Highest elevation: 597 m (1,959 ft)
- Lowest elevation: 330 m (1,080 ft)
- Population (2023): 378
  - Density: 15/km^{2} (38/sq mi)
- Time zone: UTC+01:00 (CET)
  - Summer (DST): UTC+02:00 (CEST)
- INSEE/Postal code: 03008 /03250
- ^{1} French Land Register data, which excludes lakes, ponds, glaciers > 1 km^{2} (0.386 sq mi or 247 acres) and river estuaries.

Arronnes (French pronunciation: [aʁɔn]; Occitan: Arona) is a commune in the Allier department in the Auvergne-Rhône-Alpes region of central France.

The inhabitants of the commune are known as Arronnais or Arronnaises in French.

== Geography ==
Arronnes is located some 18 kilometres (11 mi) south-east of Vichy and 6 kilometres (3.7 mi) west by south-west of Le Mayet-de-Montagne. Access to the commune is by the D995 road from Cusset in the north-west passing through the heart of the commune and the village and continuing south-east to Ferrières-sur-Sichon. Apart from the village there are the hamlets of Les Fours, Doyat, Les Barlets, and Les Etangs in the south of the commune. There are substantial forests spread over the commune occupying about 60% of the land area with the balance farmland.

The Sichon river flows from the south-east to the north-west of the commune joined by its tributary the Vareille at the village and continuing north-west to join the Allier in Vichy.

== Toponymy ==
First named in 1282: Arona from the pre-Celtic ar ("stream" or "water") and the Gallic onna meaning river.

=== Heraldry ===
Arms of Arronnes	Blazon: Or, a pal wavy of Azure between in chief a Phrygian helmet of Gules, to dexter a crozier of Sable, to sinister a key the same.

== Administration ==
List of Successive Mayors

From	To	Name	Party	Position
2001	2026	François Szypula	UDI	Former General Councillor of the canton of Le Mayet-de-Montagne (2004–2015)
2026	Current	Emmanuelle Roux		

== Population ==
Historical population
Year	Pop.	±% p.a.
1968	375	—
1975	329	−1.85%
1982	329	+0.00%
1990	299	−1.19%
1999	332	+1.17%
2007	359	+0.98%
2012	364	+0.28%
2017	374	+0.54%
2023	378	+0.18%
Source: INSEE

== Sites and monuments ==
- The Church of Saint-Léger (11th century). is registered as an historical monument. Built in granite, it once belonged to a Benedictine priory and the monks welcomed pilgrims who crossed the Bourbonnais mountains. In the church is a Bronze Bell from 1520 which is registered as a historical object.
- A Peasant's House is located in a former farmhouse from the early 19th century.

== See also ==
- Communes of the Allier department
