= Châtelus =

Châtelus may refer to the following communes in France:

- Châtelus, Allier, a commune in the Allier department in the Auvergne-Rhône-Alpes region
- Châtelus, Isère, a commune in the Isère department in the Auvergne-Rhône-Alpes region
- Châtelus, Loire, a commune in the Loire department in the Auvergne-Rhône-Alpes region
- Châtelus-le-Marcheix, a commune in the Creuse department in the Nouvelle-Aquitaine region
- Châtelus-Malvaleix, a commune in the Creuse department in the Nouvelle-Aquitaine region
