= Vichy Communauté =

- Communauté d'agglomération
- Interactive map of Vichy Communauté
- Coordinates: 46°05′N 03°33′E
- Country: France
- Region: Auvergne-Rhône-Alpes
- Department: Allier
- No. of communes: {{{nbcomm}}}
- Established: 1 January 2017

Government
  - President: Frédéric Aguilera (LR)
- Area: 741.3 km^{2} (286.2 sq mi)
- Population (2019): 82,810
  - Density: 111.7/km^{2} (289.3/sq mi)
- Website: www.vichy-communaute.fr

Vichy Communauté is the communauté d'agglomération, an intercommunal structure, centred on the town of Vichy. It is located in the Allier department, in the Auvergne-Rhône-Alpes region, central France. Created in 2017, its seat is in Vichy. Its area is 741.3 km^{2}. Its population was 82,810 in 2019, of which 24,980 in Vichy proper.

== Composition ==
The communauté d'agglomération consists of the following 39 communes:

1. Abrest
2. Arfeuilles
3. Arronnes
4. Bellerive-sur-Allier
5. Billy
6. Bost
7. Brugheas
8. Busset
9. La Chabanne
10. La Chapelle
11. Charmeil
12. Châtel-Montagne
13. Châtelus
14. Cognat-Lyonne
15. Creuzier-le-Neuf
16. Creuzier-le-Vieux
17. Cusset
18. Espinasse-Vozelle
19. Ferrières-sur-Sichon
20. La Guillermie
21. Hauterive
22. Laprugne
23. Lavoine
24. Magnet
25. Mariol
26. Le Mayet-de-Montagne
27. Molles
28. Nizerolles
29. Saint-Clément
30. Saint-Germain-des-Fossés
31. Saint-Nicolas-des-Biefs
32. Saint-Pont
33. Saint-Rémy-en-Rollat
34. Saint-Yorre
35. Serbannes
36. Seuillet
37. Vendat
38. Le Vernet
39. Vichy

== Administration ==
=== Elected members ===
The communauté d'agglomération is directed by a conseil communautaire composed of 77 members representing each of the member communes. Their proportional division is fixed by the prefectorial decree n^{o} 2669/2019 of 30 October 2019.

Number of delegates	Communes
20	Vichy
10	Cusset
6	Bellerive-sur-Allier
3	Saint-Germain-des-Fossés
2	Abrest, Creuzier-le-Vieux, Saint-Yorre
1 (+ 1 substitute)	remaining communes

=== Presidency ===
List of successive presidents of the Vichy Communauté
In office		Name	Party	Capacity	Ref.
27 January 2017	7 October 2017	Claude Malhuret	LR	Mayor of Vichy (1989-2017); Senator from Allier (since 2014)	
7 October 2017	Incumbent	Frédéric Aguilera	LR	Mayor of Vichy (since 2017)	

== See also ==
- List of intercommunalities of the Allier department
