= Droiturier =

- Commune
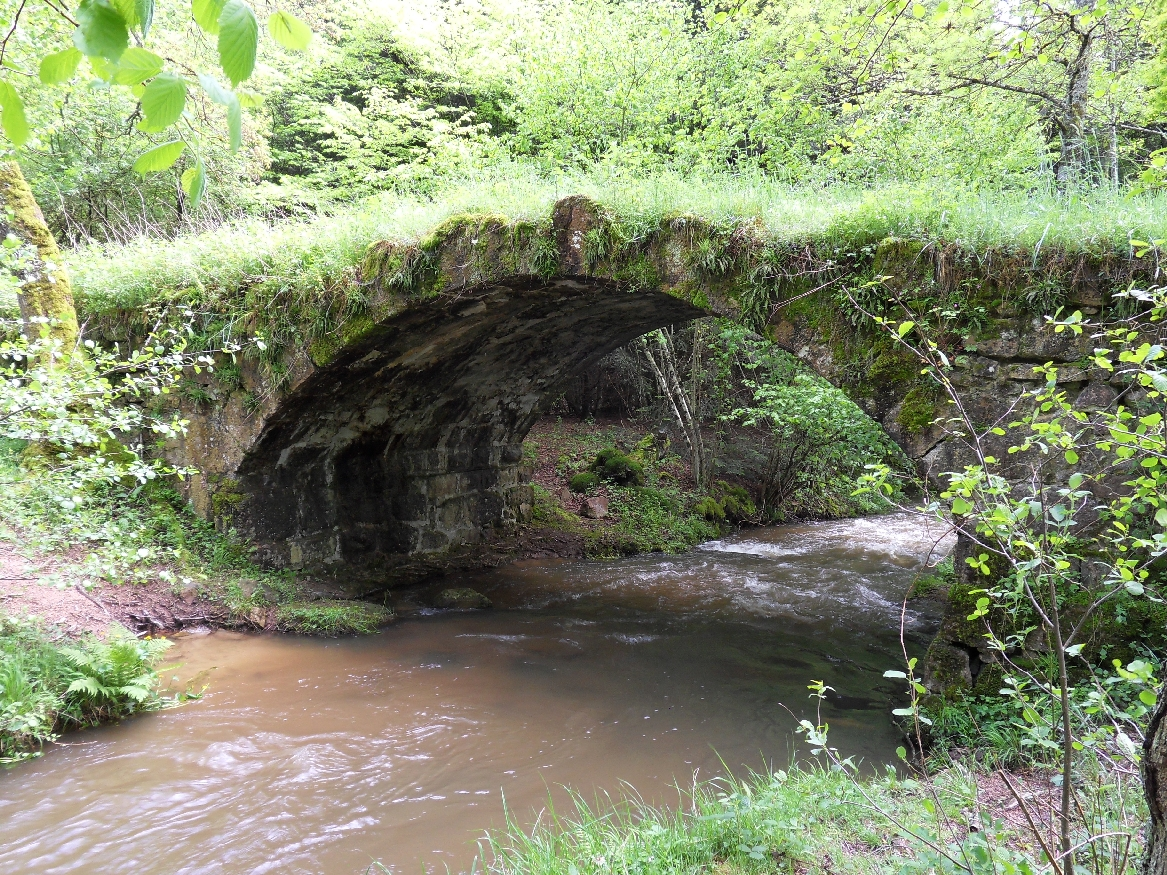
- The Romanesque bridge in Droiturier
- Location of Droiturier
- Location within France Location within Auvergne-Rhône-Alpes
- Coordinates: 46°13′53″N 3°43′09″E
- Country: France
- Region: Auvergne-Rhône-Alpes
- Department: Allier
- Arrondissement: Vichy
- Canton: Lapalisse
- Intercommunality: Pays de Lapalisse

Government
  - Mayor (2026–32): Jérôme Grouly
- Area^{1}: 22.07 km^{2} (8.52 sq mi)
- Elevation: 450 m (1,480 ft)
- Highest elevation: 472 m (1,549 ft)
- Lowest elevation: 314 m (1,030 ft)
- Population (2023): 364
  - Density: 16.5/km^{2} (42.7/sq mi)
- Demonym: Droituriers
- Time zone: UTC+01:00 (CET)
  - Summer (DST): UTC+02:00 (CEST)
- INSEE/Postal code: 03105 /03120
- ^{1} French Land Register data, which excludes lakes, ponds, glaciers > 1 km^{2} (0.386 sq mi or 247 acres) and river estuaries.

Droiturier (French pronunciation: [dʁwatyʁje]; Occitan: Dreturier) is a commune in the Allier department in central France.

== Population ==
Its inhabitants are called Droituriers in French.

Historical population
Year	Pop.	±% p.a.
1968	434	—
1975	392	−1.44%
1982	395	+0.11%
1990	433	+1.15%
1999	385	−1.30%
2007	344	−1.40%
2012	351	+0.40%
2017	336	−0.87%
2023	364	+1.34%
Source: INSEE

== See also ==
- Communes of the Allier department
