= Seuillet =

- Commune
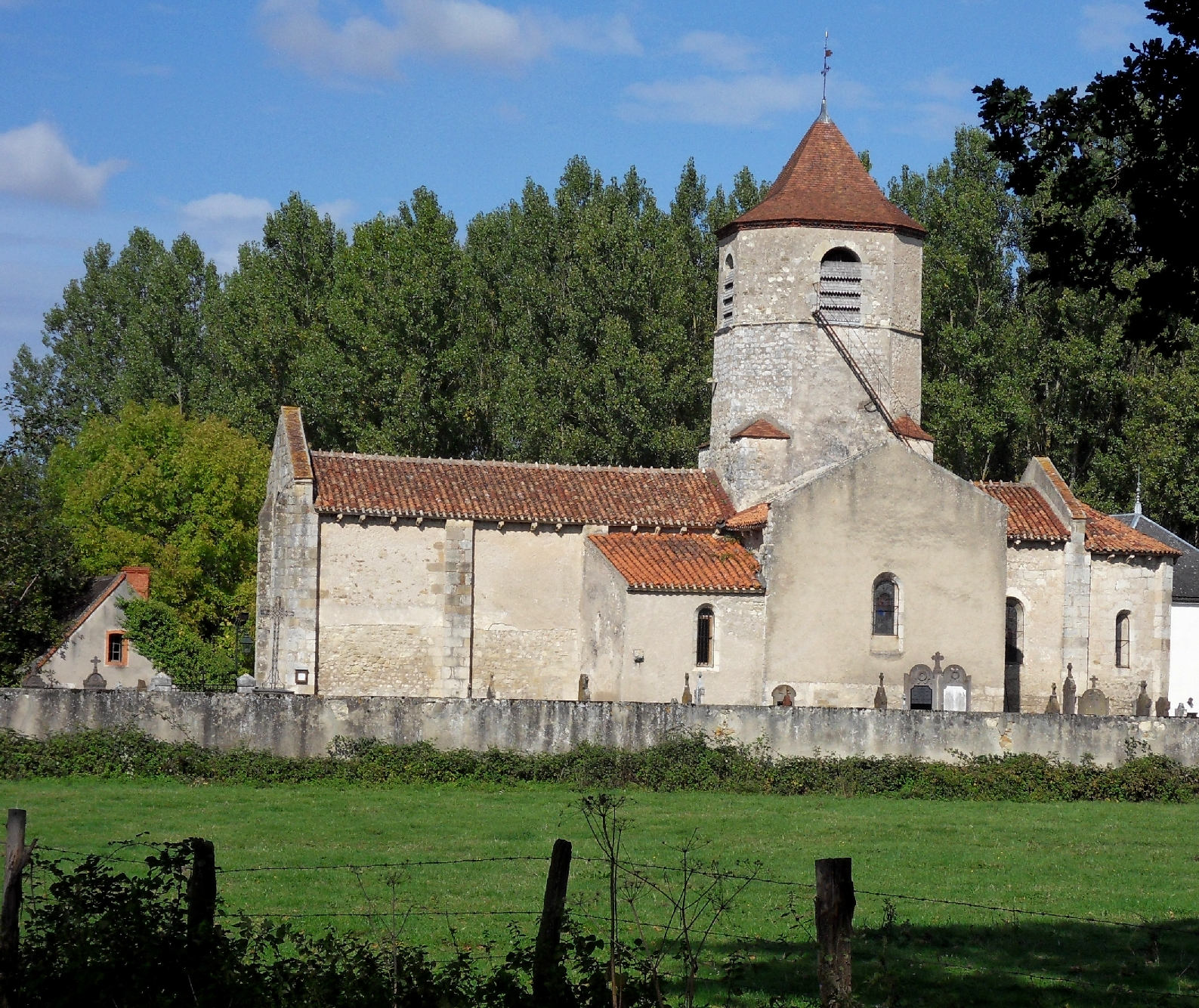
- The church in Seuillet

- Coat of arms
- Location of Seuillet
- Location within France Location within Auvergne-Rhône-Alpes
- Coordinates: 46°12′11″N 3°28′23″E
- Country: France
- Region: Auvergne-Rhône-Alpes
- Department: Allier
- Arrondissement: Vichy
- Canton: Saint-Pourçain-sur-Sioule
- Intercommunality: CA Vichy Communauté

Government
  - Mayor (2026–32): Pierre Bonnet
- Area^{1}: 9.94 km^{2} (3.84 sq mi)
- Elevation: 294 m (965 ft)
- Highest elevation: 363 m (1,191 ft)
- Lowest elevation: 246 m (807 ft)
- Population (2023): 479
  - Density: 48.2/km^{2} (125/sq mi)
- Demonym: Seuillétois
- Time zone: UTC+01:00 (CET)
  - Summer (DST): UTC+02:00 (CEST)
- INSEE/Postal code: 03273 /03260
- Website: seuillet.fr
- ^{1} French Land Register data, which excludes lakes, ponds, glaciers > 1 km^{2} (0.386 sq mi or 247 acres) and river estuaries.

Seuillet (French pronunciation: [sœjɛ]; Occitan: Suelhac) is a commune in the Allier department in Auvergne-Rhône-Alpes in central France.

== Population ==
Its inhabitants are called Seuillétois in French.

Historical population
Year	Pop.	±% p.a.
1968	354	—
1975	265	−4.05%
1982	325	+2.96%
1990	385	+2.14%
1999	418	+0.92%
2007	470	+1.48%
2012	498	+1.16%
2017	508	+0.40%
2023	479	−0.97%
Source: INSEE

== See also ==
- Communes of the Allier department
