= Saint-Clément, Allier =

Saint-Clément
- Commune
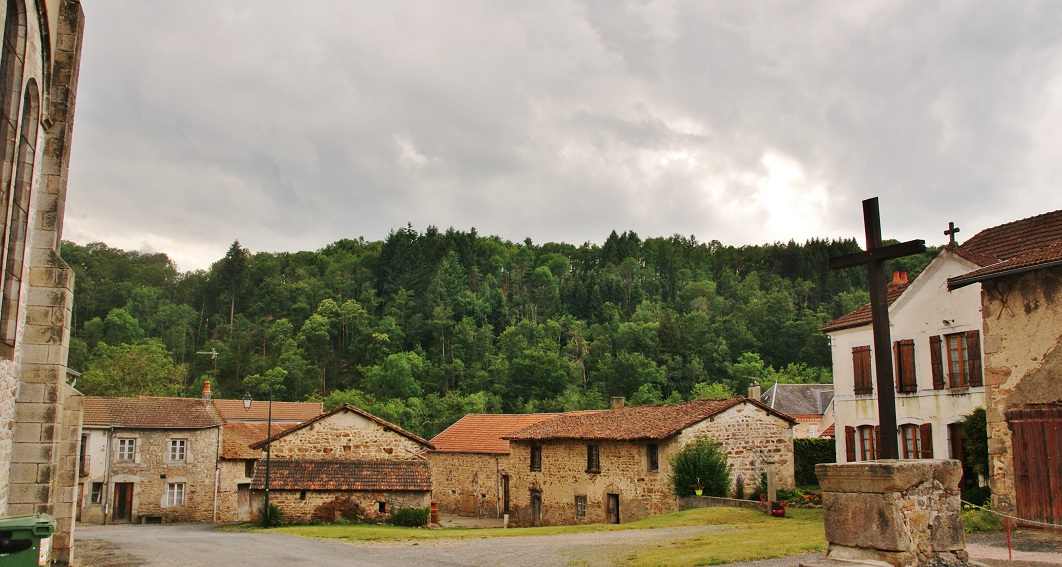
- A general view of Saint-Clément
- Location of Saint-Clément
- Location within France Location within Auvergne-Rhône-Alpes
- Coordinates: 46°03′46″N 3°42′19″E
- Country: France
- Region: Auvergne-Rhône-Alpes
- Department: Allier
- Arrondissement: Vichy
- Canton: Lapalisse
- Intercommunality: CA Vichy Communauté

Government
  - Mayor (2026–32): Laurent Nodari
- Area^{1}: 25.98 km^{2} (10.03 sq mi)
- Elevation: 495 m (1,624 ft)
- Highest elevation: 904 m (2,966 ft)
- Lowest elevation: 468 m (1,535 ft)
- Population (2023): 284
  - Density: 10.9/km^{2} (28.3/sq mi)
- Time zone: UTC+01:00 (CET)
  - Summer (DST): UTC+02:00 (CEST)
- INSEE/Postal code: 03224 /03250
- ^{1} French Land Register data, which excludes lakes, ponds, glaciers > 1 km^{2} (0.386 sq mi or 247 acres) and river estuaries.

Saint-Clément (French pronunciation: [sɛ̃ klemɑ̃]; Occitan: Sant Clemenç) is a commune in the Allier department in Auvergne-Rhône-Alpes in central France.

== Population ==
Historical population
Year	Pop.	±% p.a.
1968	489	—
1975	417	−2.25%
1982	346	−2.63%
1990	328	−0.67%
1999	330	+0.07%
2007	352	+0.81%
2012	338	−0.81%
2017	300	−2.36%
2023	284	−0.91%
Source: INSEE

== See also ==
- Communes of the Allier department
