= Magnet, Allier =

Magnet
- Commune
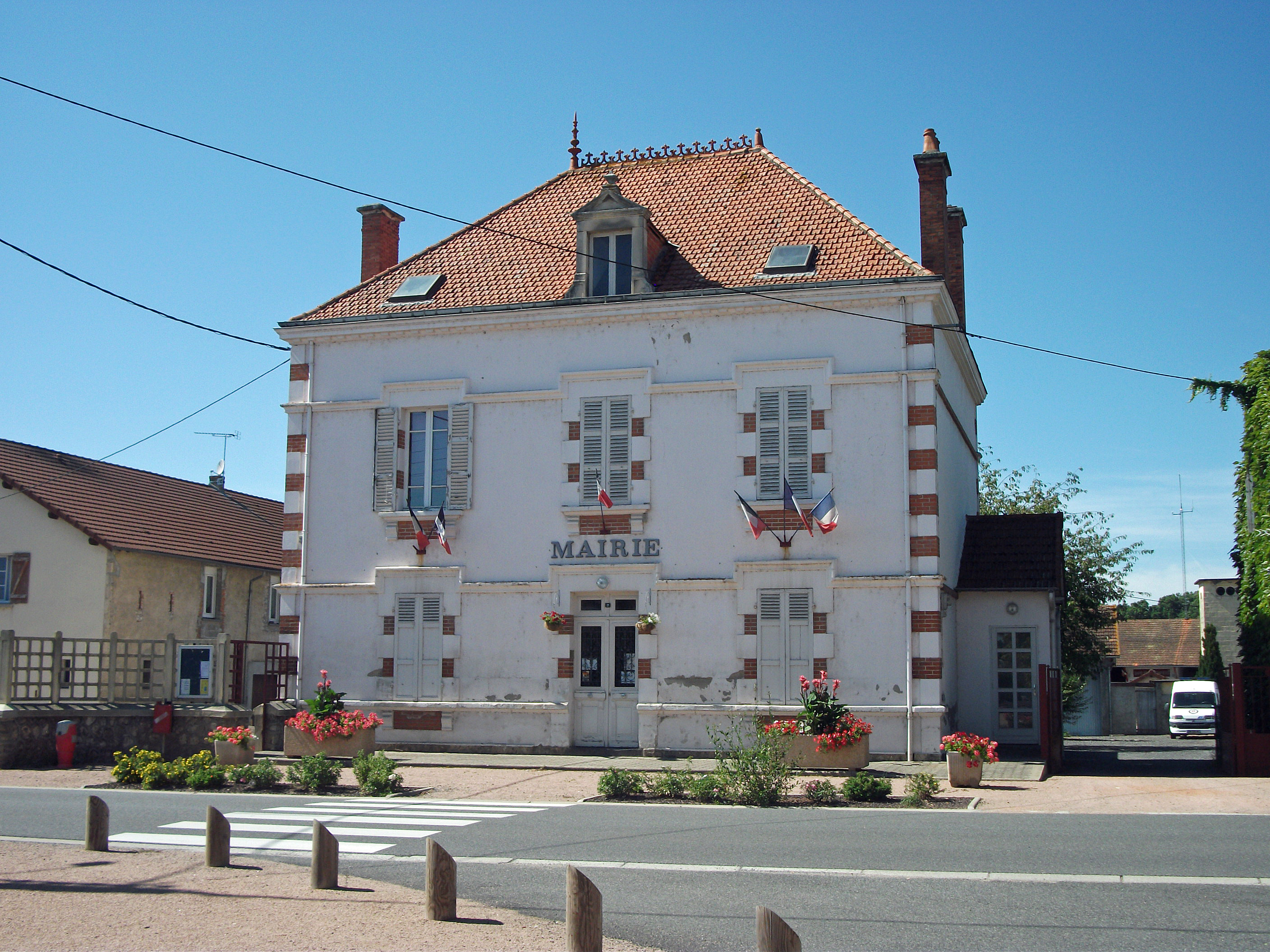
- Town hall

- Coat of arms
- Location of Magnet
- Location within France Location within Auvergne-Rhône-Alpes
- Coordinates: 46°12′48″N 3°30′16″E
- Country: France
- Region: Auvergne-Rhône-Alpes
- Department: Allier
- Arrondissement: Vichy
- Canton: Saint-Pourçain-sur-Sioule
- Intercommunality: CA Vichy Communauté

Government
  - Mayor (2026–32): Véronique Triboulet
- Area^{1}: 12.72 km^{2} (4.91 sq mi)
- Elevation: 290 m (950 ft)
- Highest elevation: 366 m (1,201 ft)
- Lowest elevation: 274 m (899 ft)
- Population (2023): 1,053
  - Density: 82.78/km^{2} (214.4/sq mi)
- Demonym: Magnétois
- Time zone: UTC+01:00 (CET)
  - Summer (DST): UTC+02:00 (CEST)
- INSEE/Postal code: 03157 /03260
- Website: magnet03.fr
- ^{1} French Land Register data, which excludes lakes, ponds, glaciers > 1 km^{2} (0.386 sq mi or 247 acres) and river estuaries.

Magnet (French pronunciation: [maɲɛ]) is a commune in the Allier department in central France.

== Population ==
Its inhabitants are called Magnétois in French.

Historical population
Year	Pop.	±% p.a.
1968	722	—
1975	611	−2.36%
1982	592	−0.45%
1990	656	+1.29%
1999	694	+0.63%
2007	761	+1.16%
2012	923	+3.94%
2017	989	+1.39%
2023	1,053	+1.05%
Source: INSEE

== Sports ==
Magnet hosted the road cycling competition of the 2023 Virtus Global Games from 5 to 7 June 2023. The cyclists completed a 4.7 kilometres (2.9 mi) loop, a 30 kilometres (19 mi) (women) or 60 kilometres (37 mi) (men) race and individual and team time trials.

== See also ==
- Communes of the Allier department
