= Laprugne =

- Commune
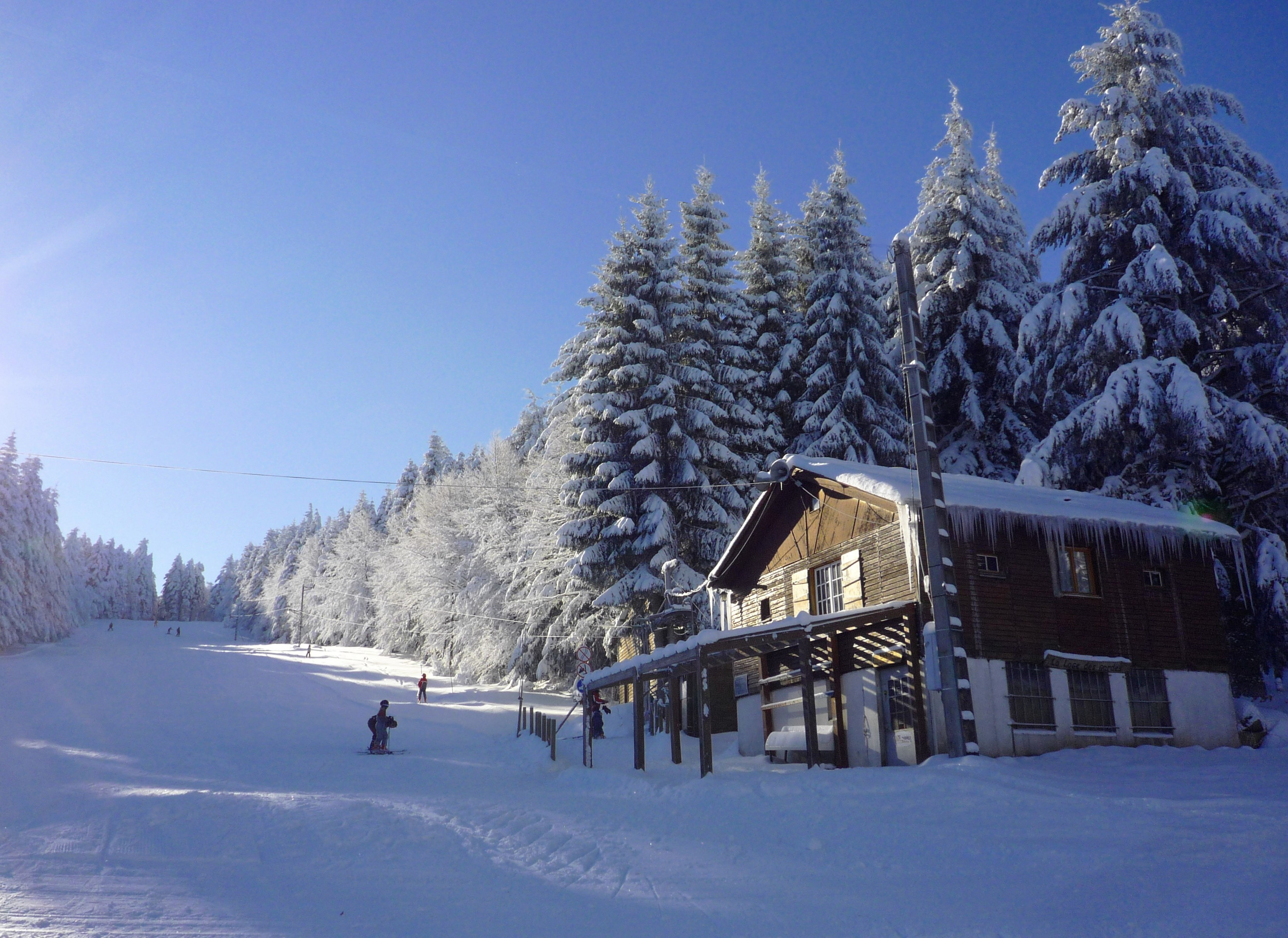
- La Loge des Gardes ski resort

- Coat of arms
- Location of Laprugne
- Location within France Location within Auvergne-Rhône-Alpes
- Coordinates: 45°59′12″N 3°44′37″E
- Country: France
- Region: Auvergne-Rhône-Alpes
- Department: Allier
- Arrondissement: Vichy
- Canton: Lapalisse
- Intercommunality: CA Vichy Communauté

Government
  - Mayor (2026–32): Murielle Waz
- Area^{1}: 34.61 km^{2} (13.36 sq mi)
- Elevation: 700 m (2,300 ft)
- Highest elevation: 1,164 m (3,819 ft)
- Lowest elevation: 549 m (1,801 ft)
- Population (2023): 308
  - Density: 8.90/km^{2} (23.0/sq mi)
- Demonym: Prugnards
- Time zone: UTC+01:00 (CET)
  - Summer (DST): UTC+02:00 (CEST)
- INSEE/Postal code: 03139 /03250
- ^{1} French Land Register data, which excludes lakes, ponds, glaciers > 1 km^{2} (0.386 sq mi or 247 acres) and river estuaries.

Laprugne (French pronunciation: [lapʁyɲ]; Arpitan: Làpruny; Occitan: Laprunha) is a commune in the Allier department in central France.

== Population ==
Its inhabitants are called Prugnards in French.

Historical population
Year	Pop.	±% p.a.
1968	1,415	—
1975	1,015	−4.64%
1982	560	−8.14%
1990	509	−1.19%
1999	405	−2.51%
2007	365	−1.29%
2012	339	−1.47%
2017	317	−1.33%
2023	308	−0.48%
Source: INSEE

== See also ==
- Communes of the Allier department
