= Périgny, Allier =

Périgny
- Commune
- Location of Périgny
- Location within France Location within Auvergne-Rhône-Alpes
- Coordinates: 46°15′06″N 3°33′21″E
- Country: France
- Region: Auvergne-Rhône-Alpes
- Department: Allier
- Arrondissement: Vichy
- Canton: Lapalisse
- Intercommunality: Pays de Lapalisse

Government
  - Mayor (2026–32): Jean-Pierre Demaret
- Area^{1}: 27.22 km^{2} (10.51 sq mi)
- Elevation: 316 m (1,037 ft)
- Highest elevation: 347 m (1,138 ft)
- Lowest elevation: 285 m (935 ft)
- Population (2023): 484
  - Density: 17.8/km^{2} (46.1/sq mi)
- Demonym: Pérignon
- Time zone: UTC+01:00 (CET)
  - Summer (DST): UTC+02:00 (CEST)
- INSEE/Postal code: 03205 /03120
- ^{1} French Land Register data, which excludes lakes, ponds, glaciers > 1 km^{2} (0.386 sq mi or 247 acres) and river estuaries.

Périgny (French pronunciation: [peʁiɲi]) is a commune in the Allier department in Auvergne-Rhône-Alpes in central France.

== Location ==
Périgny is located on the east of Allier. It is neighbored by five other communes.

== Transportation ==
The commune is intersected by the Route nationale 7, linking Paris to Lapalisse, Roanne, and Lyon.

== Population ==
Historical population
Year	Pop.	±% p.a.
1968	543	—
1975	488	−1.51%
1982	401	−2.77%
1990	416	+0.46%
1999	404	−0.32%
2007	436	+0.96%
2012	474	+1.69%
2017	440	−1.48%
2023	484	+1.60%
Source: INSEE

== See also ==
- Communes of the Allier department
