= La Chabanne =

- Commune
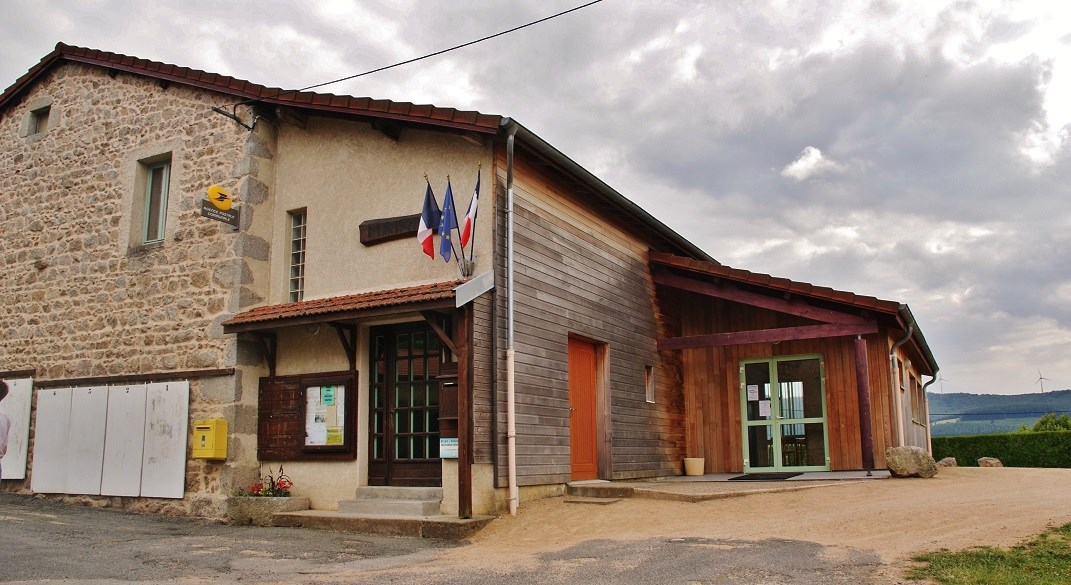
- Town hall
- Location of La Chabanne
- Location within France Location within Auvergne-Rhône-Alpes
- Coordinates: 46°01′20″N 3°45′13″E
- Country: France
- Region: Auvergne-Rhône-Alpes
- Department: Allier
- Arrondissement: Vichy
- Canton: Lapalisse
- Intercommunality: CA Vichy Communauté

Government
  - Mayor (2026–32): Jean Marc Bourel
- Area^{1}: 20 km^{2} (7.7 sq mi)
- Elevation: 680 m (2,230 ft)
- Highest elevation: 1,040 m (3,410 ft)
- Lowest elevation: 514 m (1,686 ft)
- Population (2023): 169
  - Density: 8.4/km^{2} (22/sq mi)
- Demonym: Chabannais
- Time zone: UTC+01:00 (CET)
  - Summer (DST): UTC+02:00 (CEST)
- INSEE/Postal code: 03050 /03250
- ^{1} French Land Register data, which excludes lakes, ponds, glaciers > 1 km^{2} (0.386 sq mi or 247 acres) and river estuaries.

La Chabanne (French pronunciation: [la ʃaban]; Occitan: La Chabana) is a commune in the Allier department in central France.

== Population ==
Its inhabitants are called Chabannais in French.

Historical population
Year	Pop.	±% p.a.
1968	380	—
1975	321	−2.38%
1982	263	−2.81%
1990	215	−2.49%
1999	192	−1.25%
2007	190	−0.13%
2012	195	+0.52%
2017	186	−0.94%
2023	169	−1.58%
Source: INSEE

== See also ==
- Communes of the Allier department
