= Servilly =

- Commune
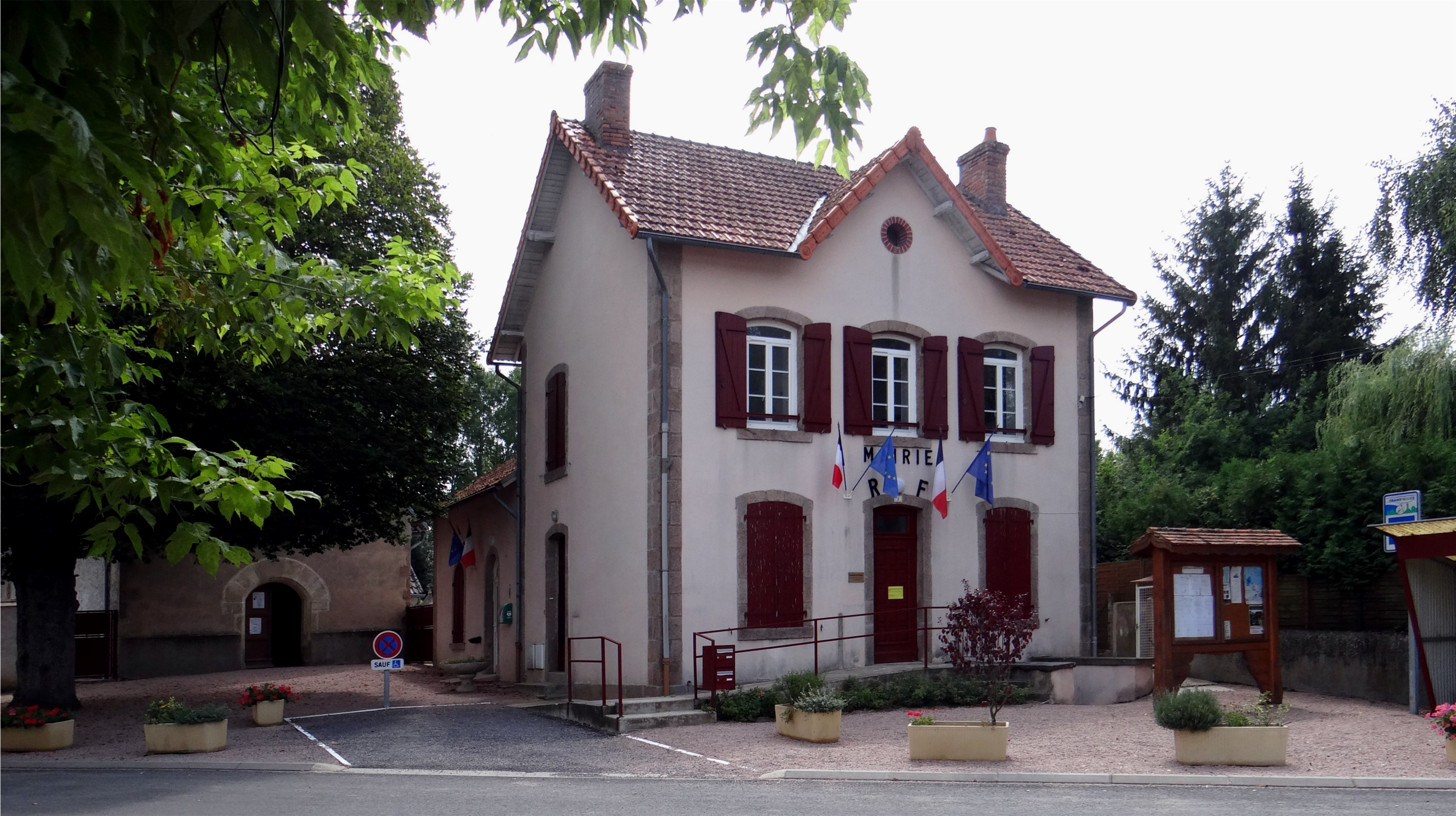
- Town hall

- Coat of arms
- Location of Servilly
- Location within France Location within Auvergne-Rhône-Alpes
- Coordinates: 46°16′43″N 3°35′14″E
- Country: France
- Region: Auvergne-Rhône-Alpes
- Department: Allier
- Arrondissement: Vichy
- Canton: Lapalisse
- Intercommunality: Pays de Lapalisse

Government
  - Mayor (2026–32): Bernard Gaud
- Area^{1}: 12.32 km^{2} (4.76 sq mi)
- Elevation: 266 m (873 ft)
- Highest elevation: 342 m (1,122 ft)
- Lowest elevation: 263 m (863 ft)
- Population (2023): 271
  - Density: 22.0/km^{2} (57.0/sq mi)
- Time zone: UTC+01:00 (CET)
  - Summer (DST): UTC+02:00 (CEST)
- INSEE/Postal code: 03272 /03120
- ^{1} French Land Register data, which excludes lakes, ponds, glaciers > 1 km^{2} (0.386 sq mi or 247 acres) and river estuaries.

Servilly is a commune in the Allier department in Auvergne-Rhône-Alpes in central France.

== Population ==
Historical population
Year	Pop.	±% p.a.
1968	311	—
1975	271	−1.95%
1982	266	−0.27%
1990	284	+0.82%
1999	263	−0.85%
2007	261	−0.10%
2012	272	+0.83%
2017	295	+1.64%
2023	271	−1.40%
Source: INSEE

== See also ==
- Communes of the Allier department
