= La Guillermie =

- Commune
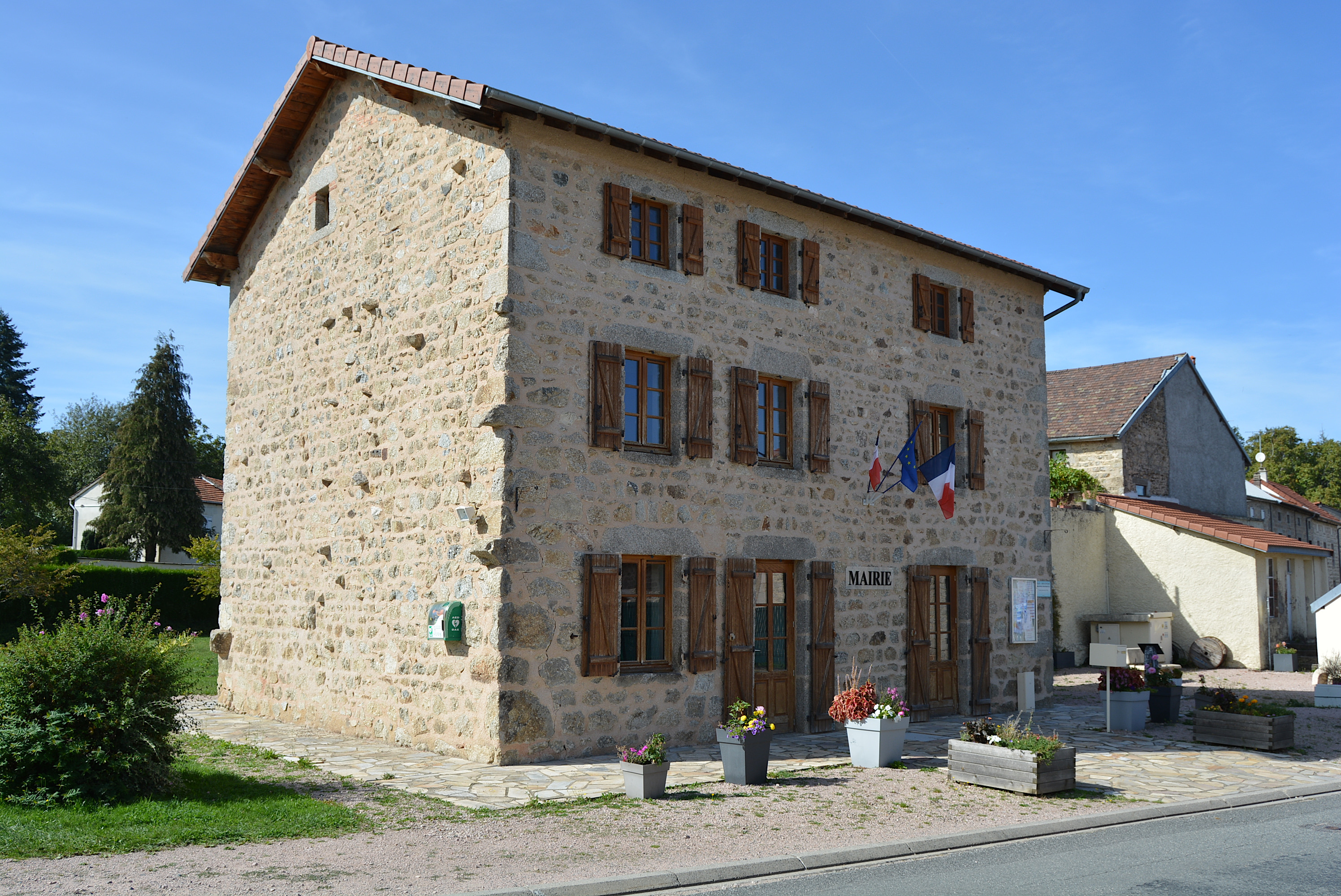
- Town hall
- Location of La Guillermie
- Location within France Location within Auvergne-Rhône-Alpes
- Coordinates: 45°58′58″N 3°38′22″E
- Country: France
- Region: Auvergne-Rhône-Alpes
- Department: Allier
- Arrondissement: Vichy
- Canton: Lapalisse
- Intercommunality: CA Vichy Communauté

Government
  - Mayor (2026–32): Gilles Perruche
- Area^{1}: 12.33 km^{2} (4.76 sq mi)
- Elevation: 730 m (2,400 ft)
- Highest elevation: 1,081 m (3,547 ft)
- Lowest elevation: 518 m (1,699 ft)
- Population (2023): 123
  - Density: 9.98/km^{2} (25.8/sq mi)
- Demonym: Guillermiauds
- Time zone: UTC+01:00 (CET)
  - Summer (DST): UTC+02:00 (CEST)
- INSEE/Postal code: 03125 /03250
- Website: la-guillermie.fr
- ^{1} French Land Register data, which excludes lakes, ponds, glaciers > 1 km^{2} (0.386 sq mi or 247 acres) and river estuaries.

La Guillermie (French pronunciation: [la gijɛʁmi]) is a commune in the Allier department in central France.

== Population ==
Its inhabitants are called Guillermiauds in French.

Historical population
Year	Pop.	±% p.a.
1968	285	—
1975	246	−2.08%
1982	193	−3.41%
1990	155	−2.70%
1999	159	+0.28%
2007	152	−0.56%
2012	136	−2.20%
2017	127	−1.36%
2023	123	−0.53%
Source: INSEE

== See also ==
- Communes of the Allier department
