= Saint-Nicolas-des-Biefs =

- Commune
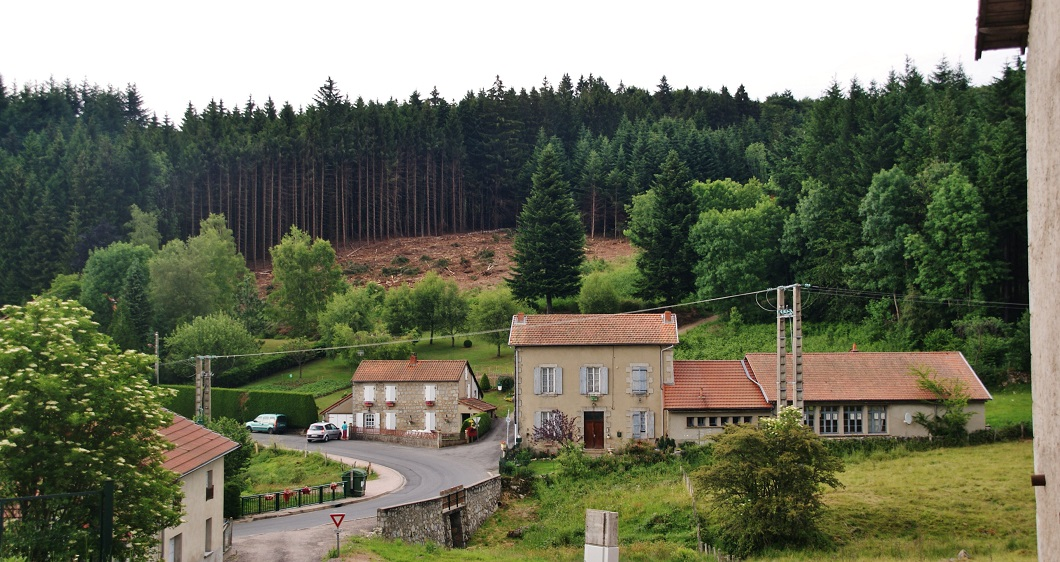
- A general view of Saint-Nicolas-des-Biefs

- Coat of arms
- Location of Saint-Nicolas-des-Biefs
- Location within France Location within Auvergne-Rhône-Alpes
- Coordinates: 46°03′38″N 3°47′01″E
- Country: France
- Region: Auvergne-Rhône-Alpes
- Department: Allier
- Arrondissement: Vichy
- Canton: Lapalisse
- Intercommunality: CA Vichy Communauté

Government
  - Mayor (2026–32): Jean-Luc Desbois
- Area^{1}: 28.9 km^{2} (11.2 sq mi)
- Elevation: 900 m (3,000 ft)
- Highest elevation: 1,122 m (3,681 ft)
- Lowest elevation: 620 m (2,030 ft)
- Population (2023): 146
  - Density: 5.05/km^{2} (13.1/sq mi)
- Demonym: Saint-Nicolavois
- Time zone: UTC+01:00 (CET)
  - Summer (DST): UTC+02:00 (CEST)
- INSEE/Postal code: 03248 /03250
- ^{1} French Land Register data, which excludes lakes, ponds, glaciers > 1 km^{2} (0.386 sq mi or 247 acres) and river estuaries.

Saint-Nicolas-des-Biefs (Arpitan: Sèn Colà) is a commune in the Allier department in Auvergne-Rhône-Alpes in central France.

== Population ==
Its inhabitants are called Saint-Nicolavois in French.

Historical population
Year	Pop.	±% p.a.
1968	333	—
1975	226	−5.39%
1982	168	−4.15%
1990	145	−1.82%
1999	160	+1.10%
2007	178	+1.34%
2012	178	+0.00%
2017	171	−0.80%
2023	146	−2.60%
Source: INSEE

== Climate ==
Climate data for Saint-Nicolas-des-Biefs (1991–2020 averages)
Month	Jan	Feb	Mar	Apr	May	Jun	Jul	Aug	Sep	Oct	Nov	Dec	Year
Record high °C (°F)	18.5 (65.3)	20.3 (68.5)	22.5 (72.5)	24.8 (76.6)	28.0 (82.4)	33.5 (92.3)	33.4 (92.1)	34.0 (93.2)	28.9 (84.0)	26.6 (79.9)	21.3 (70.3)	16.5 (61.7)	34.0 (93.2)
Mean daily maximum °C (°F)	3.5 (38.3)	3.8 (38.8)	7.2 (45.0)	10.5 (50.9)	14.5 (58.1)	18.2 (64.8)	20.5 (68.9)	20.6 (69.1)	16.2 (61.2)	12.3 (54.1)	7.0 (44.6)	4.3 (39.7)	11.6 (52.9)
Daily mean °C (°F)	1.0 (33.8)	1.1 (34.0)	3.9 (39.0)	6.8 (44.2)	10.6 (51.1)	14.2 (57.6)	16.3 (61.3)	16.5 (61.7)	12.6 (54.7)	9.3 (48.7)	4.4 (39.9)	1.8 (35.2)	8.2 (46.8)
Mean daily minimum °C (°F)	−1.5 (29.3)	−1.6 (29.1)	0.7 (33.3)	3.1 (37.6)	6.7 (44.1)	10.1 (50.2)	12.1 (53.8)	12.4 (54.3)	9.1 (48.4)	6.2 (43.2)	1.8 (35.2)	−0.6 (30.9)	4.9 (40.8)
Record low °C (°F)	−14.8 (5.4)	−17.4 (0.7)	−15.9 (3.4)	−7.8 (18.0)	−3.3 (26.1)	0.9 (33.6)	4.5 (40.1)	4.0 (39.2)	0.4 (32.7)	−6.9 (19.6)	−12.4 (9.7)	−15.2 (4.6)	−17.4 (0.7)
Average precipitation mm (inches)	110.9 (4.37)	93.0 (3.66)	90.8 (3.57)	109.1 (4.30)	137.1 (5.40)	114.7 (4.52)	126.3 (4.97)	109.6 (4.31)	116.6 (4.59)	123.5 (4.86)	137.4 (5.41)	118.2 (4.65)	1,387.2 (54.61)
Average precipitation days (≥ 1.0 mm)	13.8	11.9	12.0	12.5	13.6	11.7	10.4	10.7	10.5	13.3	14.2	14.5	149.1
Mean monthly sunshine hours	75.7	99.5	147.8	176.6	185.3	222.2	254.7	220.7	173.1	133.4	81.4	68.9	1,839.3
Source: Meteociel

== See also ==
- Communes of the Allier department
