= Nizerolles =

- Commune
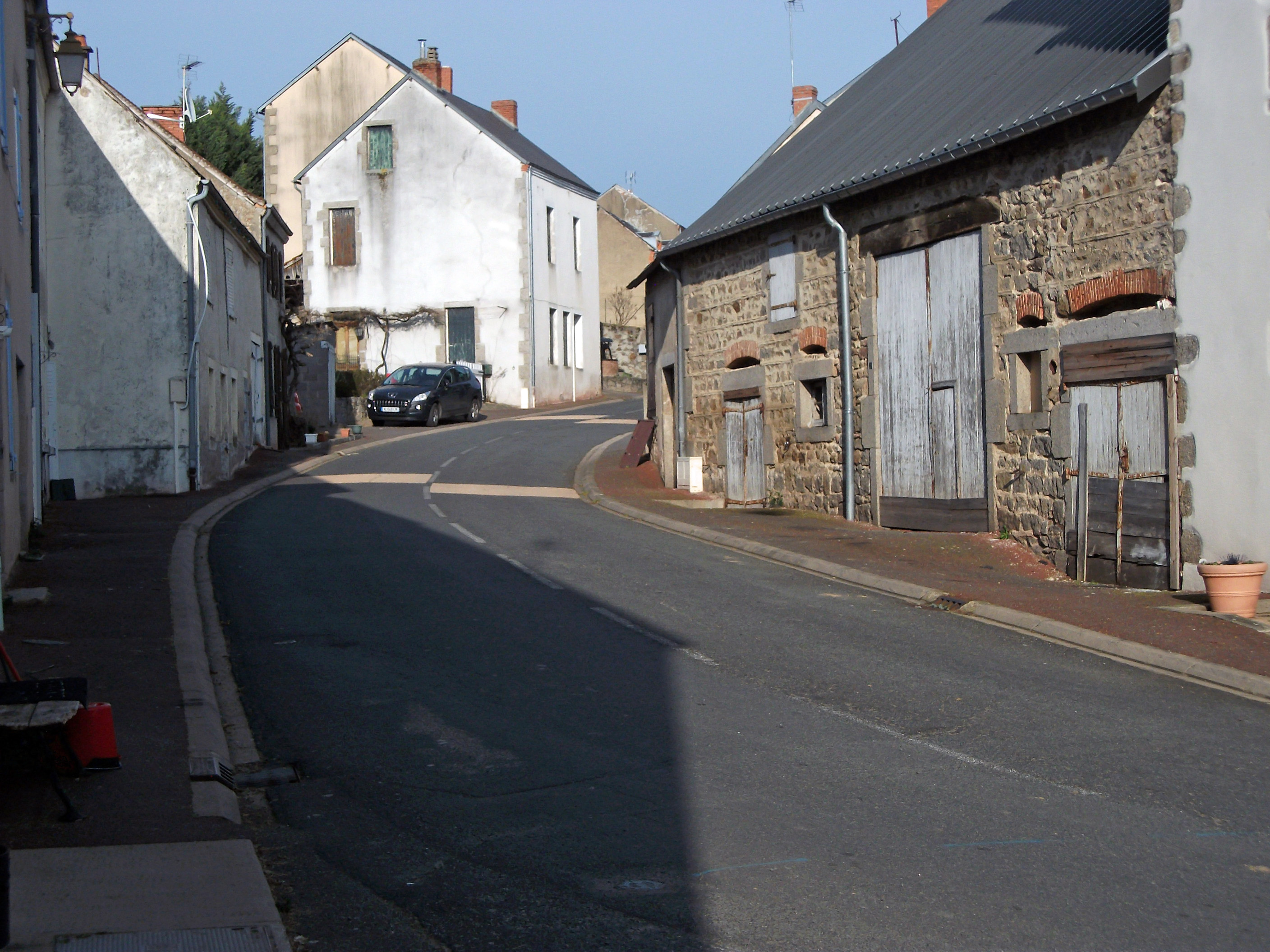
- Main street (departmental road 121)
- Location of Nizerolles
- Location within France Location within Auvergne-Rhône-Alpes
- Coordinates: 46°05′56″N 3°38′20″E
- Country: France
- Region: Auvergne-Rhône-Alpes
- Department: Allier
- Arrondissement: Vichy
- Canton: Lapalisse
- Intercommunality: CA Vichy Communauté

Government
  - Mayor (2026–32): Michaël Vial
- Area^{1}: 17.57 km^{2} (6.78 sq mi)
- Elevation: 477 m (1,565 ft)
- Highest elevation: 587 m (1,926 ft)
- Lowest elevation: 356 m (1,168 ft)
- Population (2023): 282
  - Density: 16.1/km^{2} (41.6/sq mi)
- Time zone: UTC+01:00 (CET)
  - Summer (DST): UTC+02:00 (CEST)
- INSEE/Postal code: 03201 /03250
- ^{1} French Land Register data, which excludes lakes, ponds, glaciers > 1 km^{2} (0.386 sq mi or 247 acres) and river estuaries.

Nizerolles (French pronunciation: [nizʁɔl]) is a commune in the Allier department in Auvergne-Rhône-Alpes in central France.

== Population ==
Historical population
Year	Pop.	±% p.a.
1968	389	—
1975	397	+0.29%
1982	320	−3.03%
1990	289	−1.27%
1999	303	+0.53%
2007	330	+1.07%
2012	344	+0.83%
2017	314	−1.81%
2023	282	−1.78%
Source: INSEE

== See also ==
- Communes of the Allier department
