= Lavoine =

- Commune
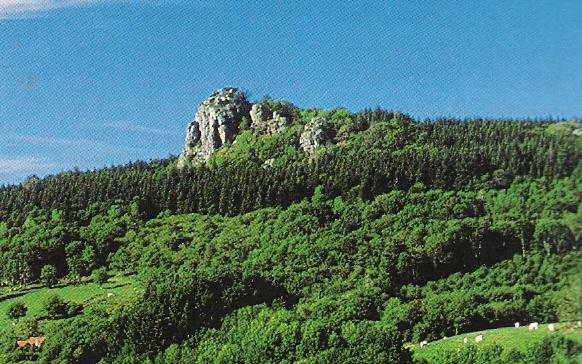
- The Rock of Saint-Vincent
- Location of Lavoine
- Location within France Location within Auvergne-Rhône-Alpes
- Coordinates: 45°58′43″N 3°41′51″E
- Country: France
- Region: Auvergne-Rhône-Alpes
- Department: Allier
- Arrondissement: Vichy
- Canton: Lapalisse
- Intercommunality: CA Vichy Communauté

Government
  - Mayor (2026–32): Pierre Gérard
- Area^{1}: 17.53 km^{2} (6.77 sq mi)
- Elevation: 800 m (2,600 ft)
- Highest elevation: 1,280 m (4,200 ft)
- Lowest elevation: 636 m (2,087 ft)
- Population (2023): 153
  - Density: 8.73/km^{2} (22.6/sq mi)
- Demonym: Lavoinais
- Time zone: UTC+01:00 (CET)
  - Summer (DST): UTC+02:00 (CEST)
- INSEE/Postal code: 03141 /03250
- Website: commune-lavoine.fr
- ^{1} French Land Register data, which excludes lakes, ponds, glaciers > 1 km^{2} (0.386 sq mi or 247 acres) and river estuaries.

Lavoine (French pronunciation: [lavwan]; Arpitan: Làvouàn) is a commune in the Allier department in central France.

== Population ==
Its inhabitants are called Lavoinais in French.

Historical population
| Year | Pop. | ±% p.a. |
|---|---|---|
| 1968 | 333 | — |
| 1975 | 299 | −1.53% |
| 1982 | 265 | −1.71% |
| 1990 | 218 | −2.41% |
| 1999 | 173 | −2.54% |
| 2007 | 152 | −1.60% |
| 2012 | 157 | +0.65% |
| 2017 | 146 | −1.44% |
| 2023 | 153 | +0.78% |
Source: INSEE

== See also ==
- Communes of the Allier department
