= Mariol =

- Commune
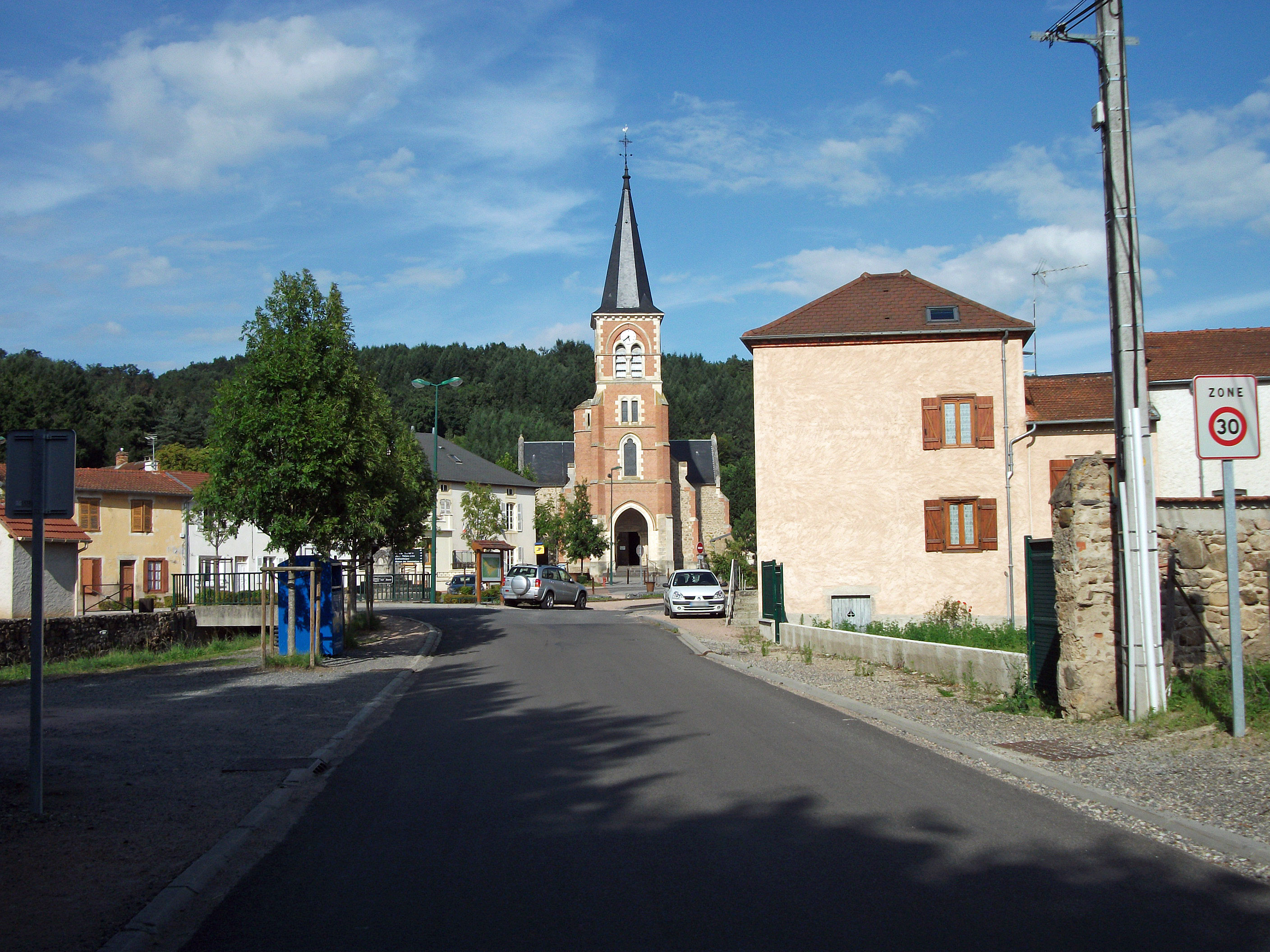
- Entrance and church in 2014
- Location of Mariol
- Location within France Location within Auvergne-Rhône-Alpes
- Coordinates: 46°01′17″N 3°29′52″E
- Country: France
- Region: Auvergne-Rhône-Alpes
- Department: Allier
- Arrondissement: Vichy
- Canton: Lapalisse
- Intercommunality: CA Vichy Communauté

Government
  - Mayor (2026–32): Romain Dejean
- Area^{1}: 9.41 km^{2} (3.63 sq mi)
- Elevation: 281 m (922 ft)
- Highest elevation: 540 m (1,770 ft)
- Lowest elevation: 256 m (840 ft)
- Population (2023): 679
  - Density: 72.2/km^{2} (187/sq mi)
- Time zone: UTC+01:00 (CET)
  - Summer (DST): UTC+02:00 (CEST)
- INSEE/Postal code: 03163 /03270
- Website: www.ville-mariol.fr
- ^{1} French Land Register data, which excludes lakes, ponds, glaciers > 1 km^{2} (0.386 sq mi or 247 acres) and river estuaries.

Mariol (French pronunciation: [maʁjɔl]) is a commune in the Allier department in central France.

== Population ==
Historical population

Year	Pop.	±% p.a.
1793	466	—
1821	1,846	+5.04%
1872	1,901	+0.06%
1926	1,946	+0.04%
1962	502	−3.69%
1968	527	+0.81%
1975	514	−0.36%

Year	Pop.	±% p.a.
1982	629	+2.93%
1990	714	+1.60%
1999	659	−0.89%
2007	772	+2.00%
2012	758	−0.37%
2017	797	+1.01%
2023	679	−2.64%

Source: EHESS and INSEE

== Administration ==
=== List of mayors ===
- unknown–March 2001: François Dassaud
- March 2001–March 2014: Nicole Eymard
- March 2014–January 2020: Gérard Marsoni
- January 2020–present: Romain Dejean

== See also ==
- Communes of the Allier department
