= Le Mayet-de-Montagne =

- Commune
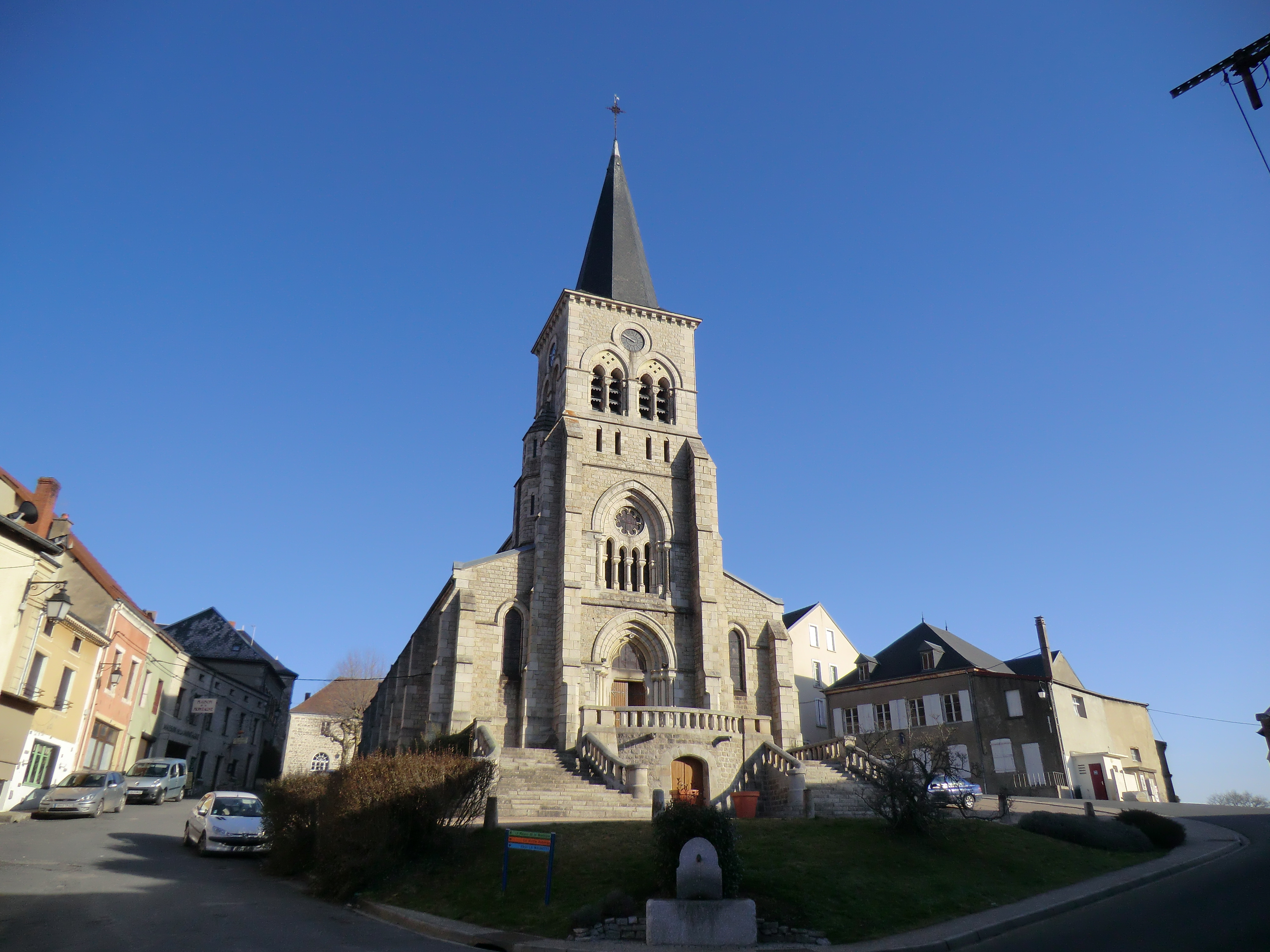
- The church in Le Mayet-de-Montagne

- Coat of arms
- Location of Le Mayet-de-Montagne
- Location within France Location within Auvergne-Rhône-Alpes
- Coordinates: 46°04′18″N 3°40′03″E
- Country: France
- Region: Auvergne-Rhône-Alpes
- Department: Allier
- Arrondissement: Vichy
- Canton: Lapalisse
- Intercommunality: CA Vichy Communauté

Government
  - Mayor (2026–32): Jean-Pierre Raymond
- Area^{1}: 29.03 km^{2} (11.21 sq mi)
- Elevation: 543 m (1,781 ft)
- Highest elevation: 880 m (2,890 ft)
- Lowest elevation: 415 m (1,362 ft)
- Population (2023): 1,383
  - Density: 47.64/km^{2} (123.4/sq mi)
- Time zone: UTC+01:00 (CET)
  - Summer (DST): UTC+02:00 (CEST)
- INSEE/Postal code: 03165 /03250
- ^{1} French Land Register data, which excludes lakes, ponds, glaciers > 1 km^{2} (0.386 sq mi or 247 acres) and river estuaries.

Le Mayet-de-Montagne (French pronunciation: [lə majɛ də mɔ̃taɲ]; Occitan: Lo Maiet de Montanha) is a commune in the Allier department in central France.

== Geography ==
Le Mayet-de-Montagne is situated 16.6 miles south of Vichy in the north part of the Massif Central. It is situated at an altitude of around 1,800 feet.

== History ==
In 1334, le Mayet de Montagne belonged to Auvergne. The counts of Auvergne considered Le Mayet to be of great strategic value, and they held onto the town until 1589, when Henri IV decided to alter the borders of Bourbonnais to include Le Mayet.

Le Mayet was the chef-lieu of its eponymous canton until 2015.

== Population ==
Historical population
Year	Pop.	±% p.a.
1968	1,694	—
1975	1,761	+0.56%
1982	1,664	−0.81%
1990	1,609	−0.42%
1999	1,598	−0.08%
2007	1,519	−0.63%
2012	1,519	+0.00%
2017	1,383	−1.86%
2023	1,383	+0.00%
Source: INSEE

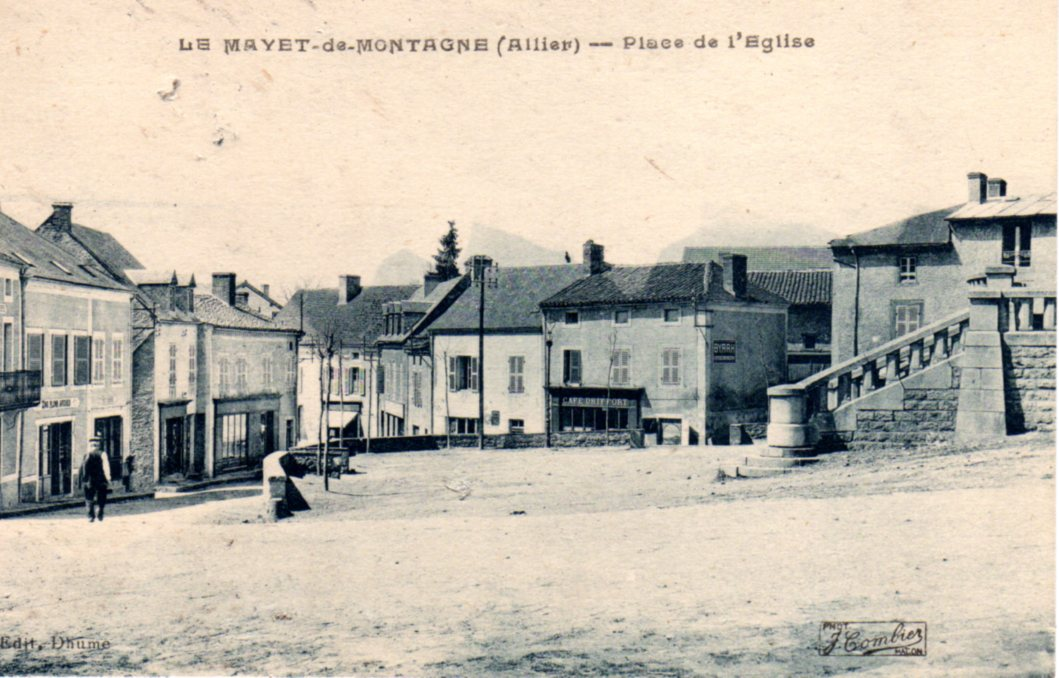
Old view of the church and square

== See also ==
- Communes of the Allier department
