= Saint-Étienne-de-Vicq =

- Commune
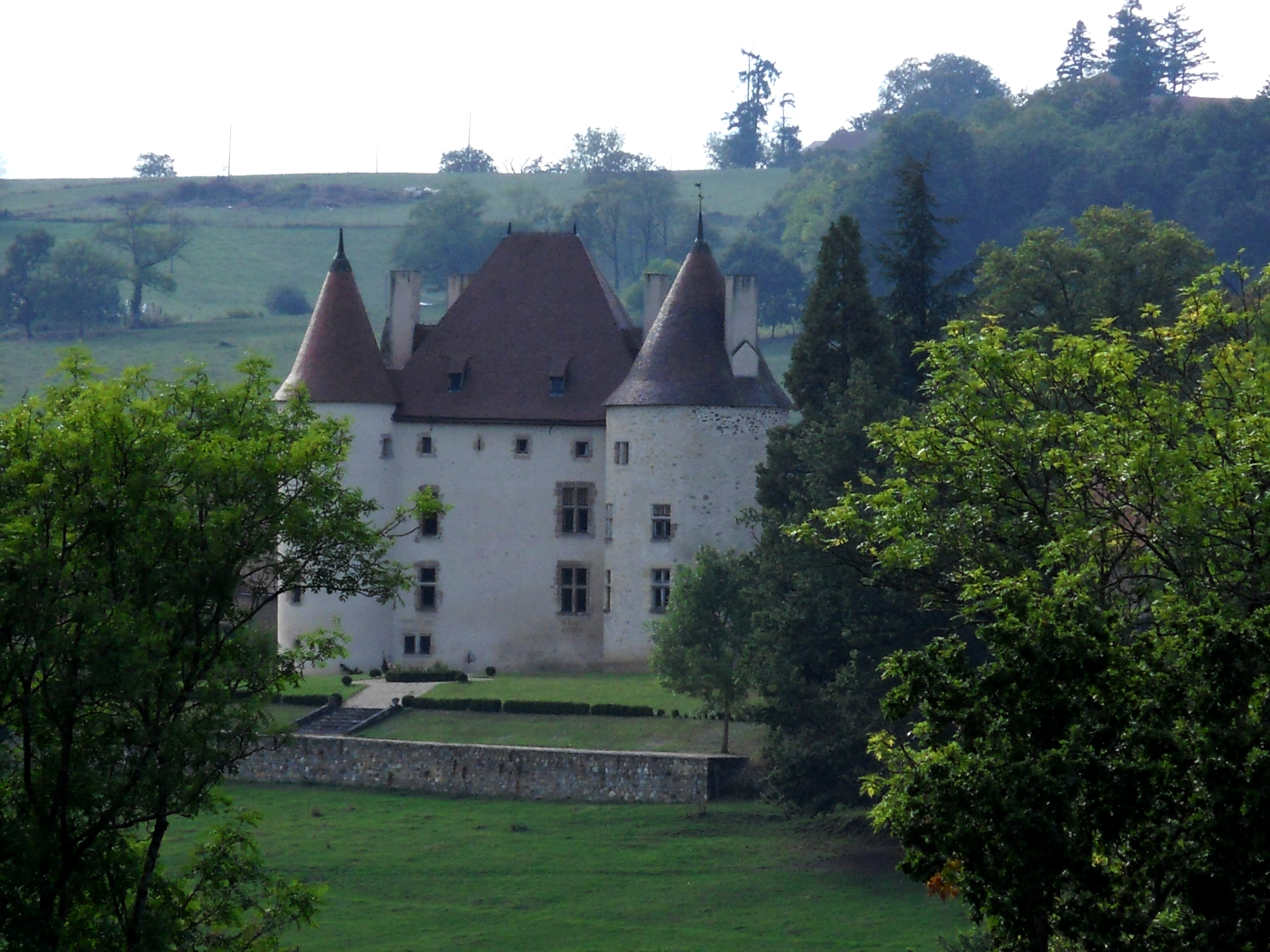
- The Château of Verseilles, in St-Etienne-de-Vicq
- Location of Saint-Étienne-de-Vicq
- Location within France Location within Auvergne-Rhône-Alpes
- Coordinates: 46°10′39″N 3°32′03″E
- Country: France
- Region: Auvergne-Rhône-Alpes
- Department: Allier
- Arrondissement: Vichy
- Canton: Lapalisse
- Intercommunality: Pays de Lapalisse

Government
  - Mayor (2026–32): Gabriel Senetaire
- Area^{1}: 19.22 km^{2} (7.42 sq mi)
- Elevation: 300 m (980 ft)
- Highest elevation: 482 m (1,581 ft)
- Lowest elevation: 278 m (912 ft)
- Population (2023): 523
  - Density: 27.2/km^{2} (70.5/sq mi)
- Time zone: UTC+01:00 (CET)
  - Summer (DST): UTC+02:00 (CEST)
- INSEE/Postal code: 03230 /03300
- ^{1} French Land Register data, which excludes lakes, ponds, glaciers > 1 km^{2} (0.386 sq mi or 247 acres) and river estuaries.

Saint-Étienne-de-Vicq (French pronunciation: [sɛ̃.t‿etjɛn də vik]; Occitan: Sent Estève de Vic) is a commune in the Allier department in Auvergne-Rhône-Alpes in central France.

== Population ==
Historical population
Year	Pop.	±% p.a.
1968	451	—
1975	419	−1.05%
1982	390	−1.02%
1990	406	+0.50%
1999	431	+0.67%
2007	477	+1.28%
2012	533	+2.24%
2017	526	−0.26%
2023	523	−0.10%
Source: INSEE

== See also ==
- Communes of the Allier department
