= Canton of Lapalisse =

Coordinates: 46.25°N 3.63°E

- Canton
- Situation of the canton of Lapalisse in the department of Allier
- Country: France
- Region: Auvergne-Rhône-Alpes
- Department: Allier
- No. of communes: {{{nbcomm}}}
- Population (2023): 17,729
- INSEE code: 0308

The canton of Lapalisse is an administrative division of the Allier department, in central France. At the French canton reorganisation which came into effect in March 2015, it was expanded from 15 to 31 communes. Its seat is in Lapalisse.

It consists of the following communes:

1. Andelaroche
2. Arfeuilles
3. Arronnes
4. Barrais-Bussolles
5. Billezois
6. Le Breuil
7. Busset
8. La Chabanne
9. La Chapelle
10. Châtel-Montagne
11. Châtelus
12. Droiturier
13. Ferrières-sur-Sichon
14. La Guillermie
15. Isserpent
16. Lapalisse
17. Laprugne
18. Lavoine
19. Mariol
20. Le Mayet-de-Montagne
21. Molles
22. Nizerolles
23. Périgny
24. Saint-Christophe-en-Bourbonnais
25. Saint-Clément
26. Saint-Étienne-de-Vicq
27. Saint-Nicolas-des-Biefs
28. Saint-Pierre-Laval
29. Saint-Prix
30. Servilly
31. Le Vernet
