= Saint-Pierre-Laval =

- Commune
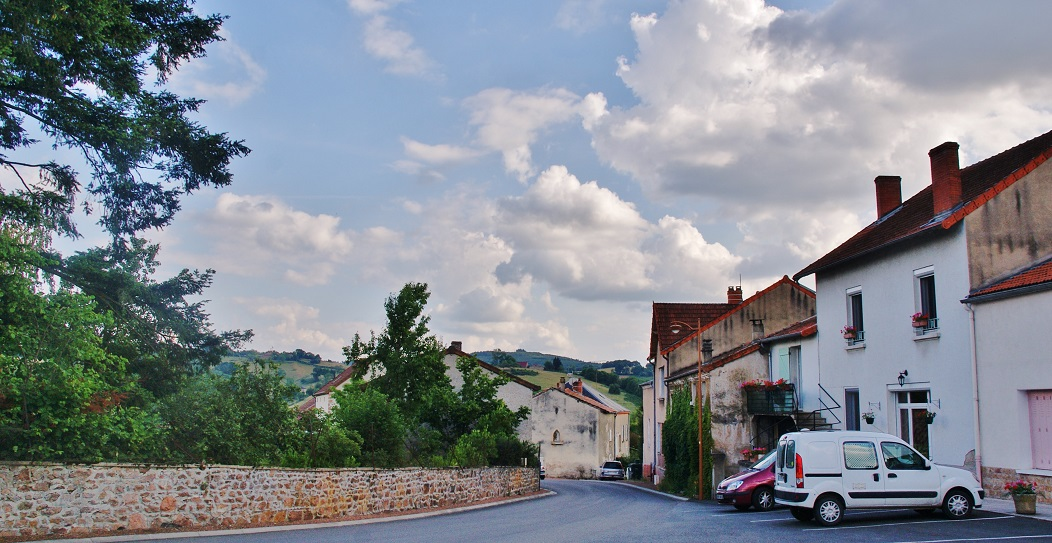
- A view within Saint-Pierre-Laval

- Coat of arms
- Location of Saint-Pierre-Laval
- Location within France Location within Auvergne-Rhône-Alpes
- Coordinates: 46°12′09″N 3°46′50″E
- Country: France
- Region: Auvergne-Rhône-Alpes
- Department: Allier
- Arrondissement: Vichy
- Canton: Lapalisse
- Intercommunality: Pays de Lapalisse

Government
  - Mayor (2026–32): André Latour
- Area^{1}: 24.03 km^{2} (9.28 sq mi)
- Elevation: 400 m (1,300 ft)
- Highest elevation: 664 m (2,178 ft)
- Lowest elevation: 339 m (1,112 ft)
- Population (2023): 373
  - Density: 15.5/km^{2} (40.2/sq mi)
- Time zone: UTC+01:00 (CET)
  - Summer (DST): UTC+02:00 (CEST)
- INSEE/Postal code: 03250 /42620
- ^{1} French Land Register data, which excludes lakes, ponds, glaciers > 1 km^{2} (0.386 sq mi or 247 acres) and river estuaries.

Saint-Pierre-Laval (French pronunciation: [sɛ̃ pjɛʁ laval]; Arpitan: Sèn Pière) is a commune in the Allier department in Auvergne-Rhône-Alpes in central France.

== Population ==
Historical population
Year	Pop.	±% p.a.
1968	533	—
1975	572	+1.01%
1982	468	−2.83%
1990	416	−1.46%
1999	362	−1.53%
2007	368	+0.21%
2012	377	+0.48%
2017	357	−1.08%
2023	373	+0.73%
Source: INSEE

== See also ==
- Communes of the Allier department
