= Châtelus, Allier =

Châtelus
- Commune
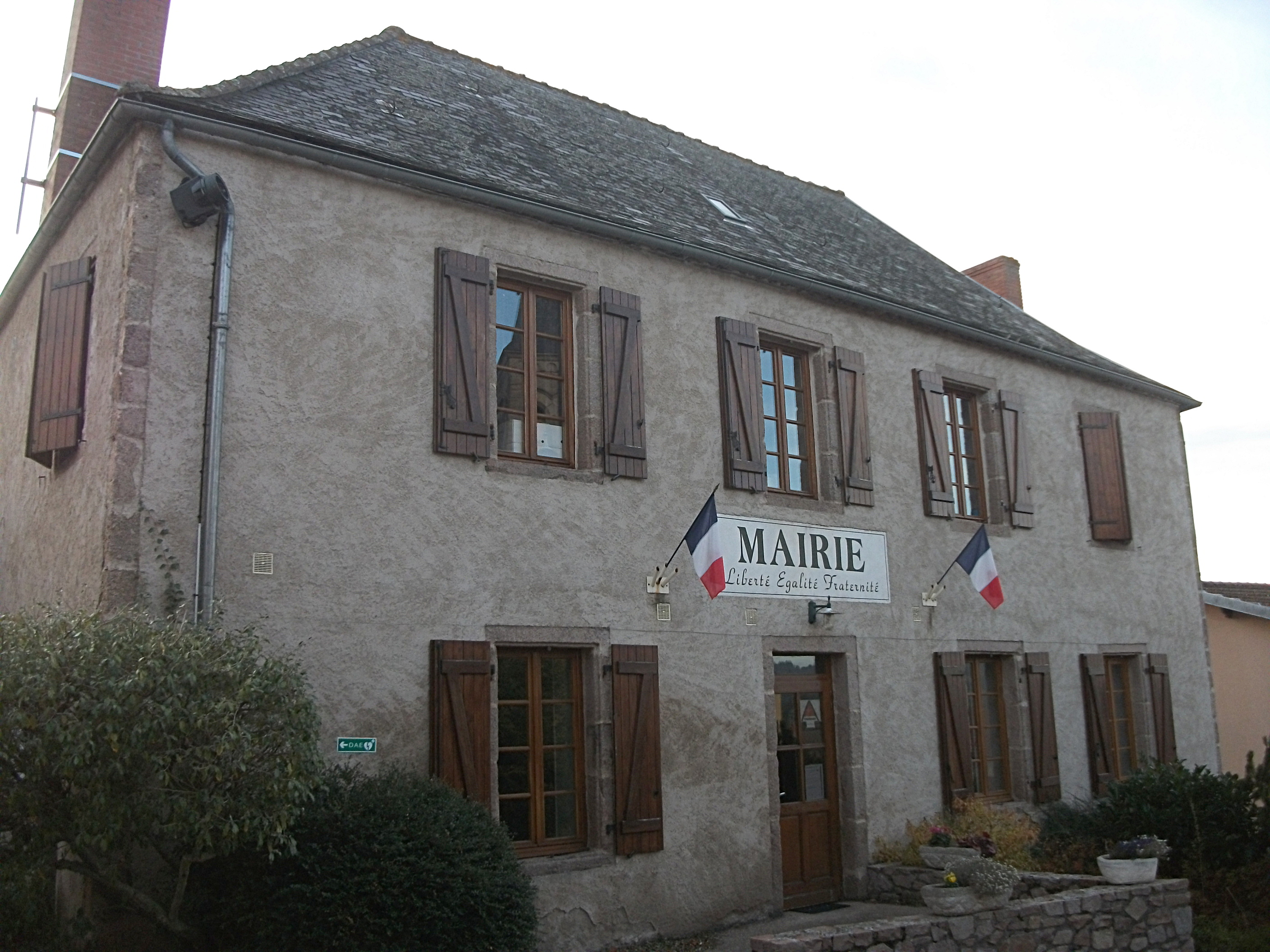
- Town hall

- Coat of arms
- Location of Châtelus
- Location within France Location within Auvergne-Rhône-Alpes
- Coordinates: 46°11′38″N 3°44′05″E
- Country: France
- Region: Auvergne-Rhône-Alpes
- Department: Allier
- Arrondissement: Vichy
- Canton: Lapalisse
- Intercommunality: CA Vichy Communauté

Government
  - Mayor (2026–32): Gerard Etien
- Area^{1}: 6.64 km^{2} (2.56 sq mi)
- Elevation: 360 m (1,180 ft)
- Highest elevation: 505 m (1,657 ft)
- Lowest elevation: 315 m (1,033 ft)
- Population (2023): 119
  - Density: 17.9/km^{2} (46.4/sq mi)
- Time zone: UTC+01:00 (CET)
  - Summer (DST): UTC+02:00 (CEST)
- INSEE/Postal code: 03068 /03120
- ^{1} French Land Register data, which excludes lakes, ponds, glaciers > 1 km^{2} (0.386 sq mi or 247 acres) and river estuaries.

Châtelus is a commune in the Allier department in central France.

== Population ==
Historical population
Year	Pop.	±% p.a.
1968	183	—
1975	194	+0.84%
1982	169	−1.95%
1990	140	−2.33%
1999	132	−0.65%
2007	134	+0.19%
2012	123	−1.70%
2017	108	−2.57%
2023	119	+1.63%
Source: INSEE

== See also ==
- Communes of the Allier department
