= Isserpent =

- Commune
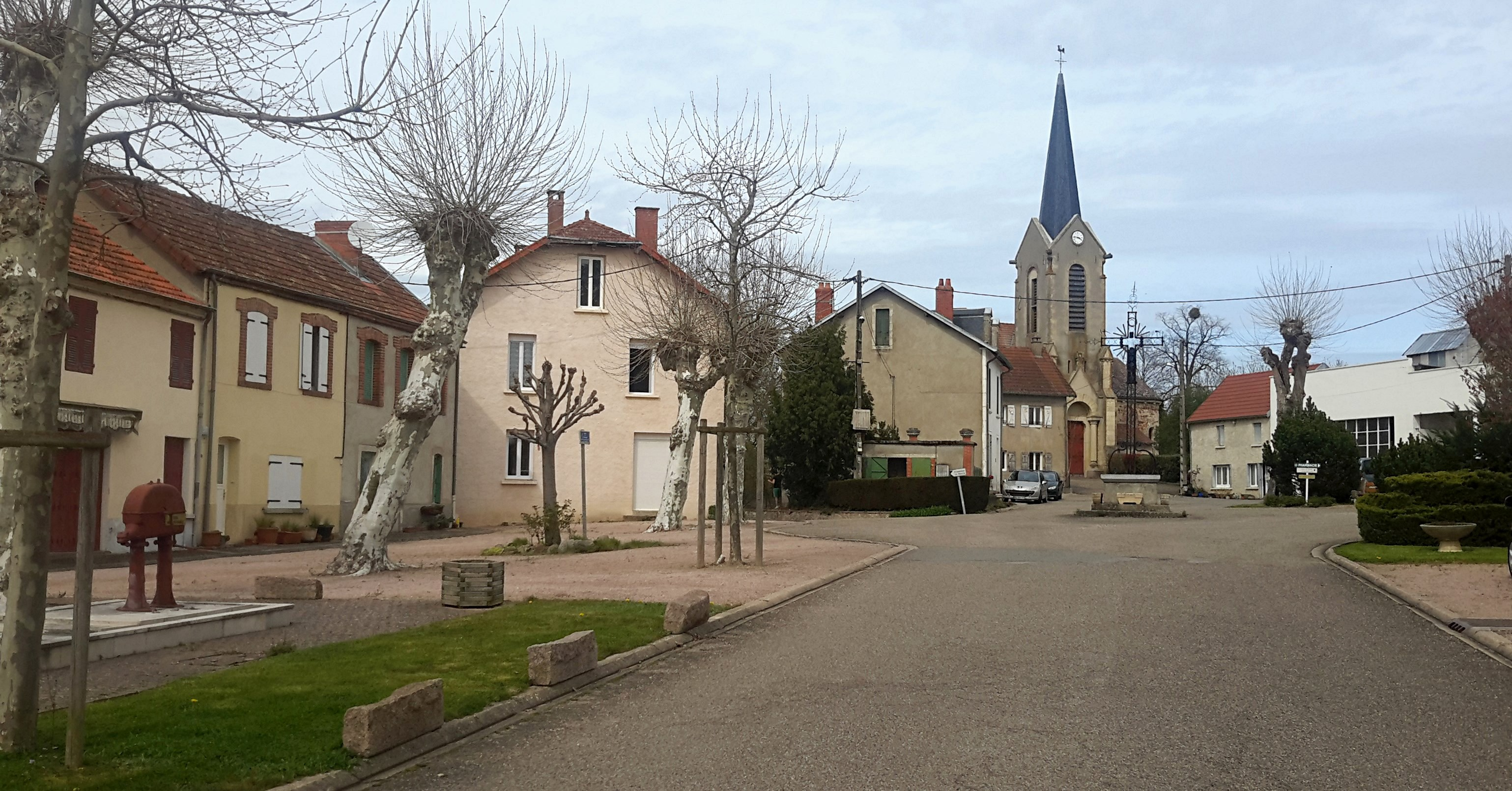
- A view of Isserpent

- Coat of arms
- Location of Isserpent
- Location within France Location within Auvergne-Rhône-Alpes
- Coordinates: 46°09′49″N 3°36′35″E
- Country: France
- Region: Auvergne-Rhône-Alpes
- Department: Allier
- Arrondissement: Vichy
- Canton: Lapalisse
- Intercommunality: Pays de Lapalisse

Government
  - Mayor (2026–32): Louis Salles
- Area^{1}: 26.31 km^{2} (10.16 sq mi)
- Elevation: 350 m (1,150 ft)
- Highest elevation: 543 m (1,781 ft)
- Lowest elevation: 316 m (1,037 ft)
- Population (2023): 560
  - Density: 21/km^{2} (55/sq mi)
- Demonym: Isserpentois
- Time zone: UTC+01:00 (CET)
  - Summer (DST): UTC+02:00 (CEST)
- INSEE/Postal code: 03131 /03120
- ^{1} French Land Register data, which excludes lakes, ponds, glaciers > 1 km^{2} (0.386 sq mi or 247 acres) and river estuaries.

Isserpent (French pronunciation: [isɛʁpɑ̃]) is a commune in the Allier department in central France.

== Population ==
Its inhabitants are called Isserpentois in French.

Historical population
Year	Pop.	±% p.a.
1968	677	—
1975	569	−2.45%
1982	536	−0.85%
1990	511	−0.60%
1999	485	−0.58%
2007	493	+0.20%
2012	511	+0.72%
2017	534	+0.88%
2023	560	+0.80%
Source: INSEE

== See also ==
- Communes of the Allier department
