= Saint-Prix, Allier =

Saint-Prix
- Commune
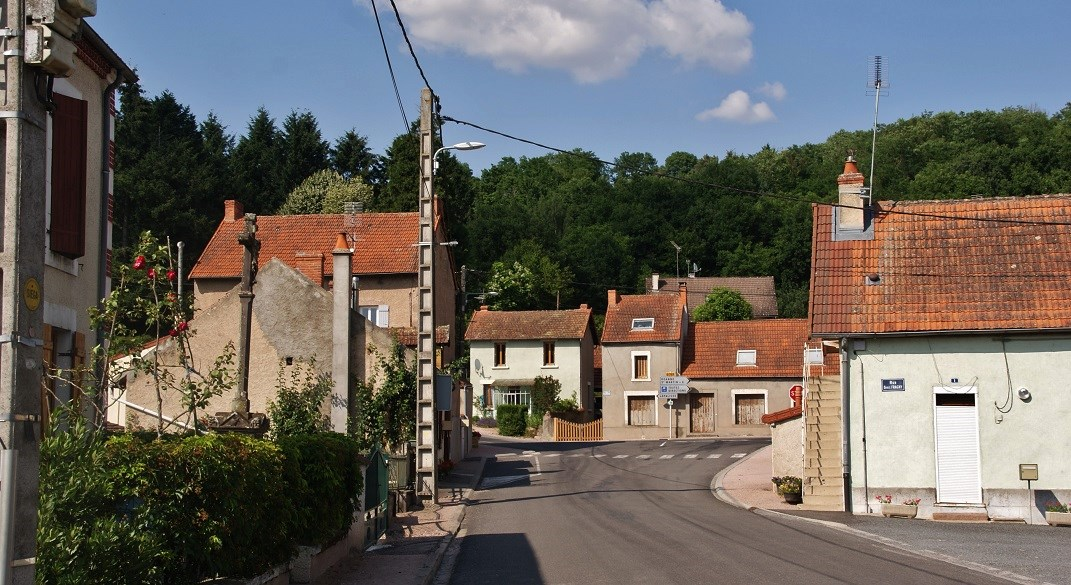
- A view within Saint-Prix
- Location of Saint-Prix
- Location within France Location within Auvergne-Rhône-Alpes
- Coordinates: 46°13′58″N 3°39′06″E
- Country: France
- Region: Auvergne-Rhône-Alpes
- Department: Allier
- Arrondissement: Vichy
- Canton: Lapalisse
- Intercommunality: Pays de Lapalisse

Government
  - Mayor (2026–32): Didier Hangard
- Area^{1}: 21.75 km^{2} (8.40 sq mi)
- Elevation: 319 m (1,047 ft)
- Highest elevation: 386 m (1,266 ft)
- Lowest elevation: 279 m (915 ft)
- Population (2023): 776
  - Density: 35.7/km^{2} (92.4/sq mi)
- Demonym: Saint-Prirois
- Time zone: UTC+01:00 (CET)
  - Summer (DST): UTC+02:00 (CEST)
- INSEE/Postal code: 03257 /03120
- ^{1} French Land Register data, which excludes lakes, ponds, glaciers > 1 km^{2} (0.386 sq mi or 247 acres) and river estuaries.

Saint-Prix (French pronunciation: [sɛ̃ pʁi]) is a commune in the Allier department in Auvergne-Rhône-Alpes in central France.

== Population ==
Its inhabitants are called Saint-Prirois in French.

Historical population
Year	Pop.	±% p.a.
1968	830	—
1975	797	−0.58%
1982	837	+0.70%
1990	840	+0.04%
1999	809	−0.42%
2007	805	−0.06%
2012	776	−0.73%
2017	796	+0.51%
2023	776	−0.42%
Source: INSEE

== See also ==
- Communes of the Allier department
