= Billezois =

- Commune
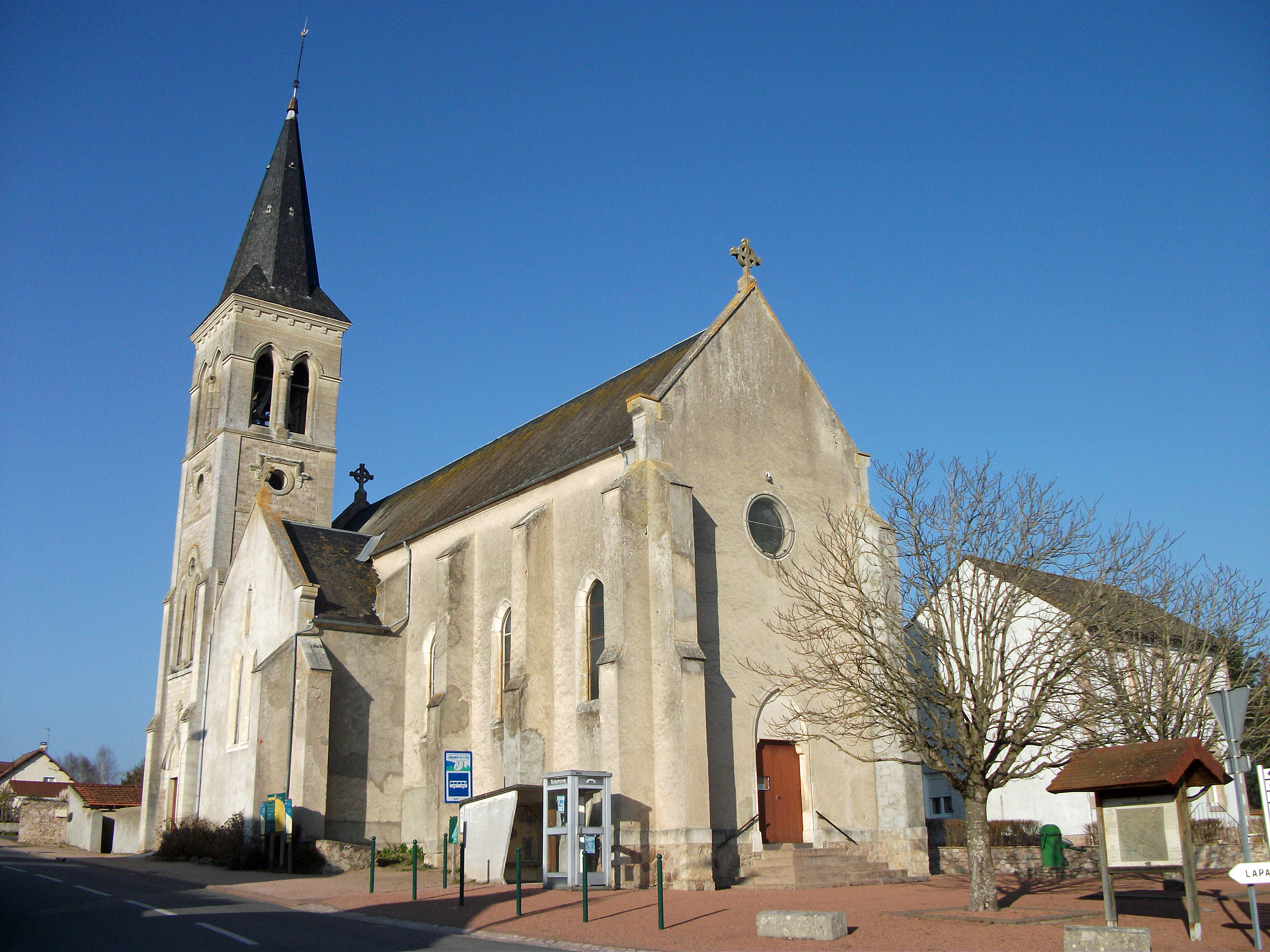
- The church

- Coat of arms
- Location of Billezois
- Location within France Location within Auvergne-Rhône-Alpes
- Coordinates: 46°12′39″N 3°34′23″E
- Country: France
- Region: Auvergne-Rhône-Alpes
- Department: Allier
- Arrondissement: Vichy
- Canton: Lapalisse
- Intercommunality: Pays de Lapalisse

Government
  - Mayor (2026–32): Yves Planche
- Area^{1}: 15.68 km^{2} (6.05 sq mi)
- Elevation: 318 m (1,043 ft)
- Highest elevation: 353 m (1,158 ft)
- Lowest elevation: 287 m (942 ft)
- Population (2023): 363
  - Density: 23.2/km^{2} (60.0/sq mi)
- Demonym(s): Billezoissians (en); Billezoissiens (fr) or Bizellois
- Time zone: UTC+01:00 (CET)
  - Summer (DST): UTC+02:00 (CEST)
- INSEE/Postal code: 03028 /03120
- Website: mairie-billezois.fr (in French)
- ^{1} French Land Register data, which excludes lakes, ponds, glaciers > 1 km^{2} (0.386 sq mi or 247 acres) and river estuaries.

Billezois (Occitan, Bilhasés) is a commune in the Allier department in central France.

== Geography ==
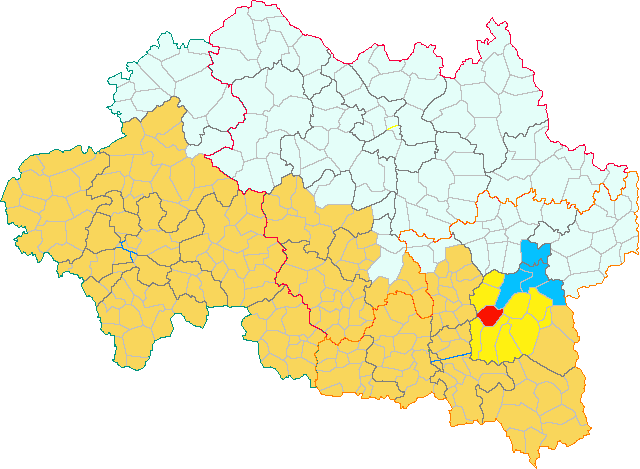
Billezois in the Pays de Lapalisse intercommunality.

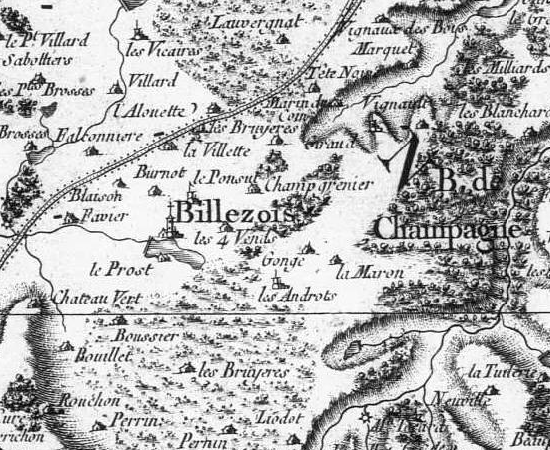
Billezois on the map of Cassini (end of the 18th century).

== Population ==
Its inhabitants are called Billezoissians (Billezoissiens), or Bizellois.

Historical population
Year	Pop.	±% p.a.
1968	306	—
1975	292	−0.67%
1982	297	+0.24%
1990	345	+1.89%
1999	346	+0.03%
2007	370	+0.84%
2012	395	+1.32%
2017	379	−0.82%
2023	363	−0.72%
Source: INSEE

== See also ==
- Communes of the Allier department
