= La Chapelle, Allier =

La Chapelle La Chapela (Occitan)
- Commune
- A view of La Chapelle

- Coat of arms
- Location of La Chapelle
- Location within France Location within Auvergne-Rhône-Alpes
- Coordinates: 46°05′31″N 3°34′22″E
- Country: France
- Region: Auvergne-Rhône-Alpes
- Department: Allier
- Arrondissement: Vichy
- Canton: Lapalisse
- Intercommunality: CA Vichy Communauté

Government
  - Mayor (2026–32): Sandra Szypula
- Area^{1}: 21.7 km^{2} (8.4 sq mi)
- Elevation: 500 m (1,600 ft)
- Highest elevation: 586 m (1,923 ft)
- Lowest elevation: 331 m (1,086 ft)
- Population (2023): 399
  - Density: 18.4/km^{2} (47.6/sq mi)
- Demonym(s): Chapelois; Chapellois; Chapelains
- Time zone: UTC+01:00 (CET)
  - Summer (DST): UTC+02:00 (CEST)
- INSEE/Postal code: 03056 /03300
- ^{1} French Land Register data, which excludes lakes, ponds, glaciers > 1 km^{2} (0.386 sq mi or 247 acres) and river estuaries.

La Chapelle (French pronunciation: [la ʃapɛl]; lit. 'The Chapel'; Occitan: La Chapela) is a rural commune in the Allier department in central France.

== Population ==
Its inhabitants are called Chapelois, Chapellois or Chapelains in French.

Historical population
Year	Pop.	±% p.a.
1968	471	—
1975	413	−1.86%
1982	415	+0.07%
1990	360	−1.76%
1999	348	−0.38%
2007	381	+1.14%
2012	378	−0.16%
2017	370	−0.43%
2023	399	+1.27%
Source: INSEE

== See also ==
- Communes of the Allier department
