= Châtel-Montagne =

- Commune
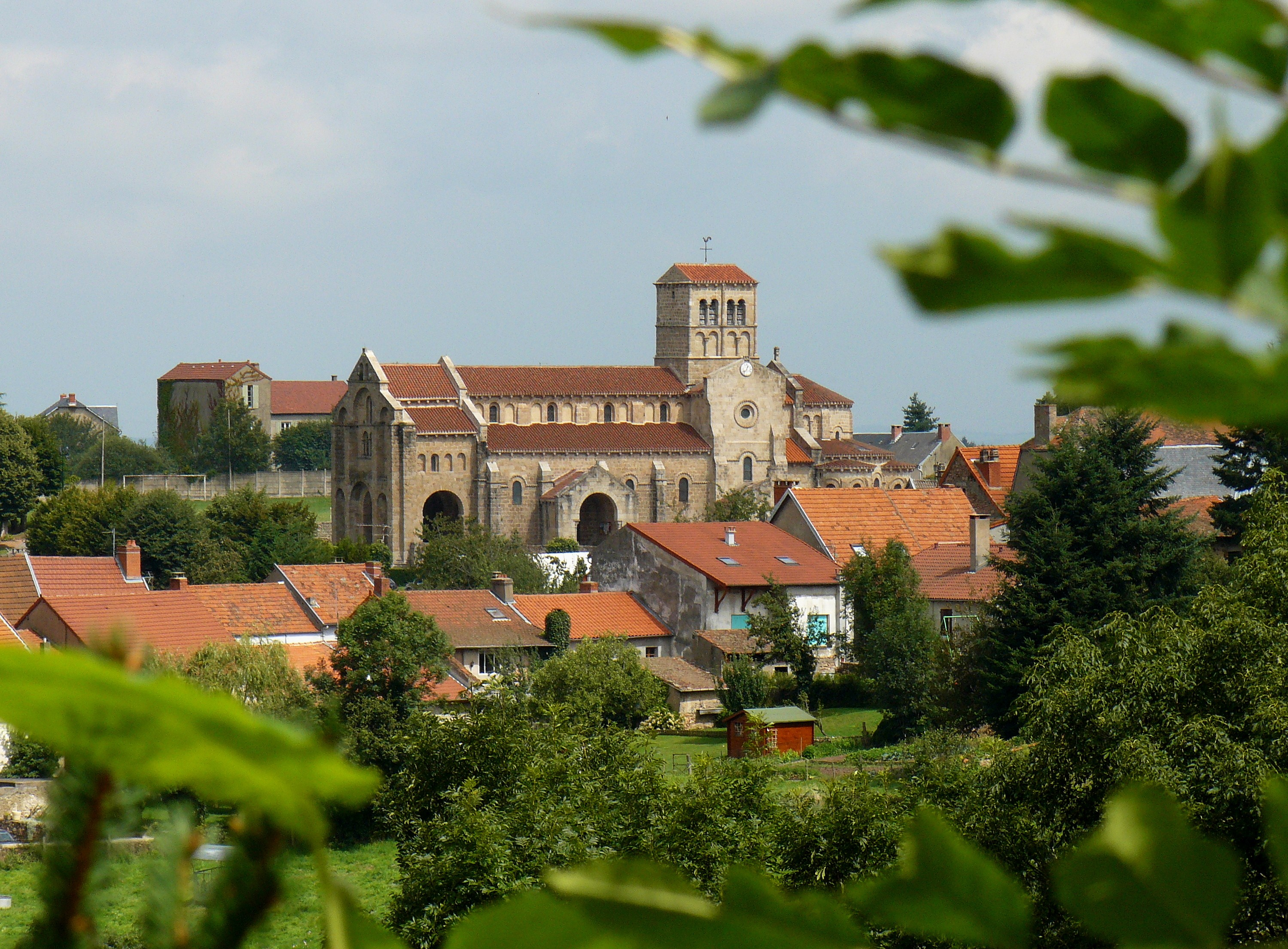
- The church and surrounding buildings in Châtel-Montagne

- Coat of arms
- Location of Châtel-Montagne
- Location within France Location within Auvergne-Rhône-Alpes
- Coordinates: 46°06′50″N 3°41′01″E
- Country: France
- Region: Auvergne-Rhône-Alpes
- Department: Allier
- Arrondissement: Vichy
- Canton: Lapalisse
- Intercommunality: CA Vichy Communauté

Government
  - Mayor (2026–32): Jean-Claude Brat
- Area^{1}: 36.81 km^{2} (14.21 sq mi)
- Elevation: 530 m (1,740 ft)
- Highest elevation: 972 m (3,189 ft)
- Lowest elevation: 331 m (1,086 ft)
- Population (2023): 326
  - Density: 8.86/km^{2} (22.9/sq mi)
- Time zone: UTC+01:00 (CET)
  - Summer (DST): UTC+02:00 (CEST)
- INSEE/Postal code: 03066 /03250
- ^{1} French Land Register data, which excludes lakes, ponds, glaciers > 1 km^{2} (0.386 sq mi or 247 acres) and river estuaries.

Châtel-Montagne (French pronunciation: [ʃatɛl mɔ̃taɲ]; Occitan: Chastèlmontanha) is a commune in the Allier department in central France.

== Population ==
Historical population
Year	Pop.	±% p.a.
1968	572	—
1975	501	−1.88%
1982	426	−2.29%
1990	400	−0.78%
1999	373	−0.77%
2007	422	+1.55%
2012	395	−1.31%
2017	347	−2.56%
2023	326	−1.04%
Source: INSEE

== See also ==
- Communes of the Allier department
