= Molles =

- Commune
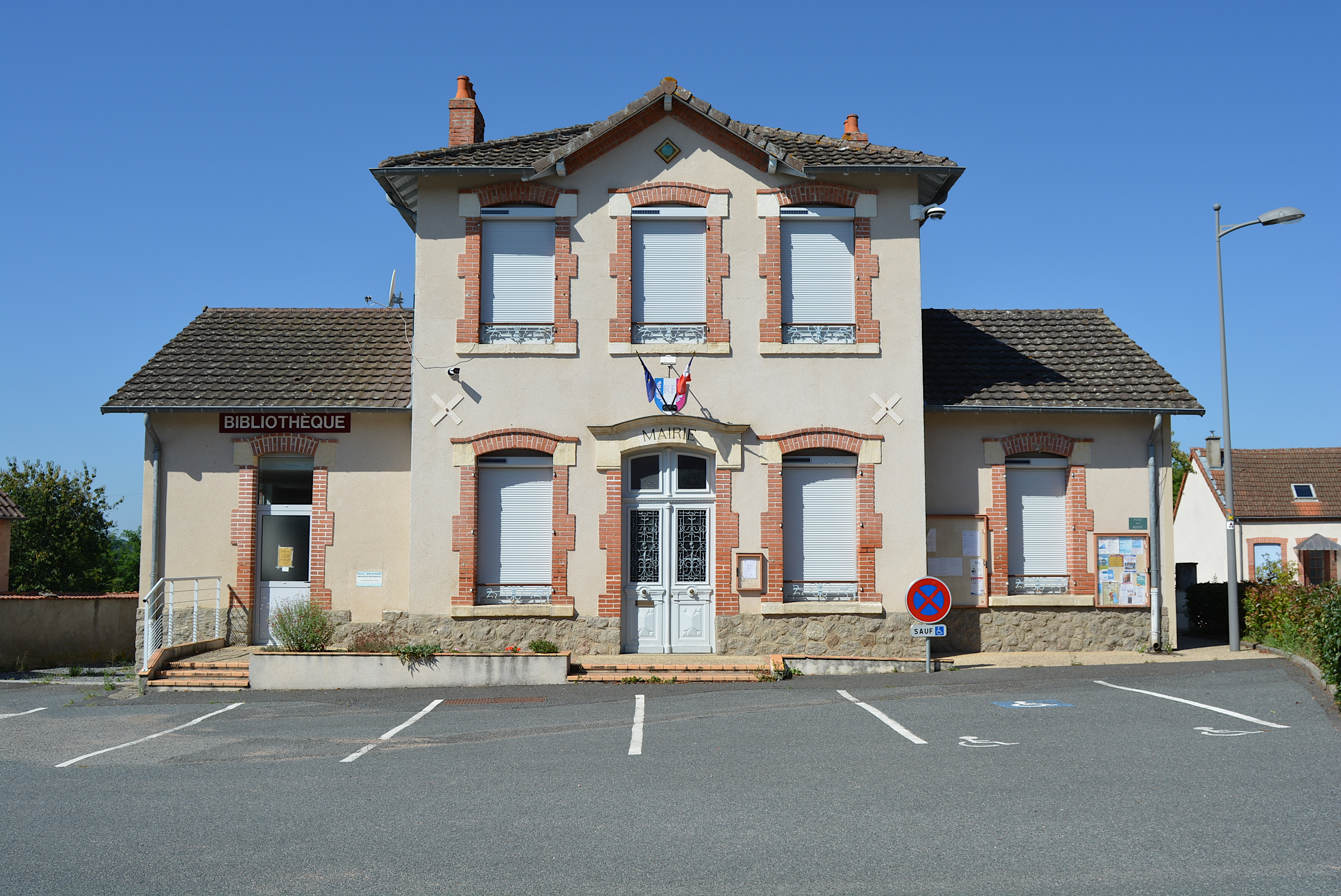
- The town hall in Molles

- Coat of arms
- Location of Molles
- Location within France Location within Auvergne-Rhône-Alpes
- Coordinates: 46°06′44″N 3°33′33″E
- Country: France
- Region: Auvergne-Rhône-Alpes
- Department: Allier
- Arrondissement: Vichy
- Canton: Lapalisse
- Intercommunality: CA Vichy Communauté

Government
  - Mayor (2026–32): Christophe Dumont
- Area^{1}: 26.89 km^{2} (10.38 sq mi)
- Elevation: 480 m (1,570 ft)
- Highest elevation: 495 m (1,624 ft)
- Lowest elevation: 325 m (1,066 ft)
- Population (2023): 904
  - Density: 33.6/km^{2} (87.1/sq mi)
- Time zone: UTC+01:00 (CET)
  - Summer (DST): UTC+02:00 (CEST)
- INSEE/Postal code: 03174 /03300
- ^{1} French Land Register data, which excludes lakes, ponds, glaciers > 1 km^{2} (0.386 sq mi or 247 acres) and river estuaries.

Molles (French pronunciation: [mɔl]; Occitan: Mòlas) is a commune in the Allier department in central France.

== Population ==
Historical population
Year	Pop.	±% p.a.
1968	737	—
1975	687	−1.00%
1982	688	+0.02%
1990	732	+0.78%
1999	709	−0.35%
2007	791	+1.38%
2012	848	+1.40%
2017	898	+1.15%
2023	904	+0.11%
Source: INSEE

== See also ==
- Communes of the Allier department
