= Le Breuil, Allier =

Le Breuil
- Commune
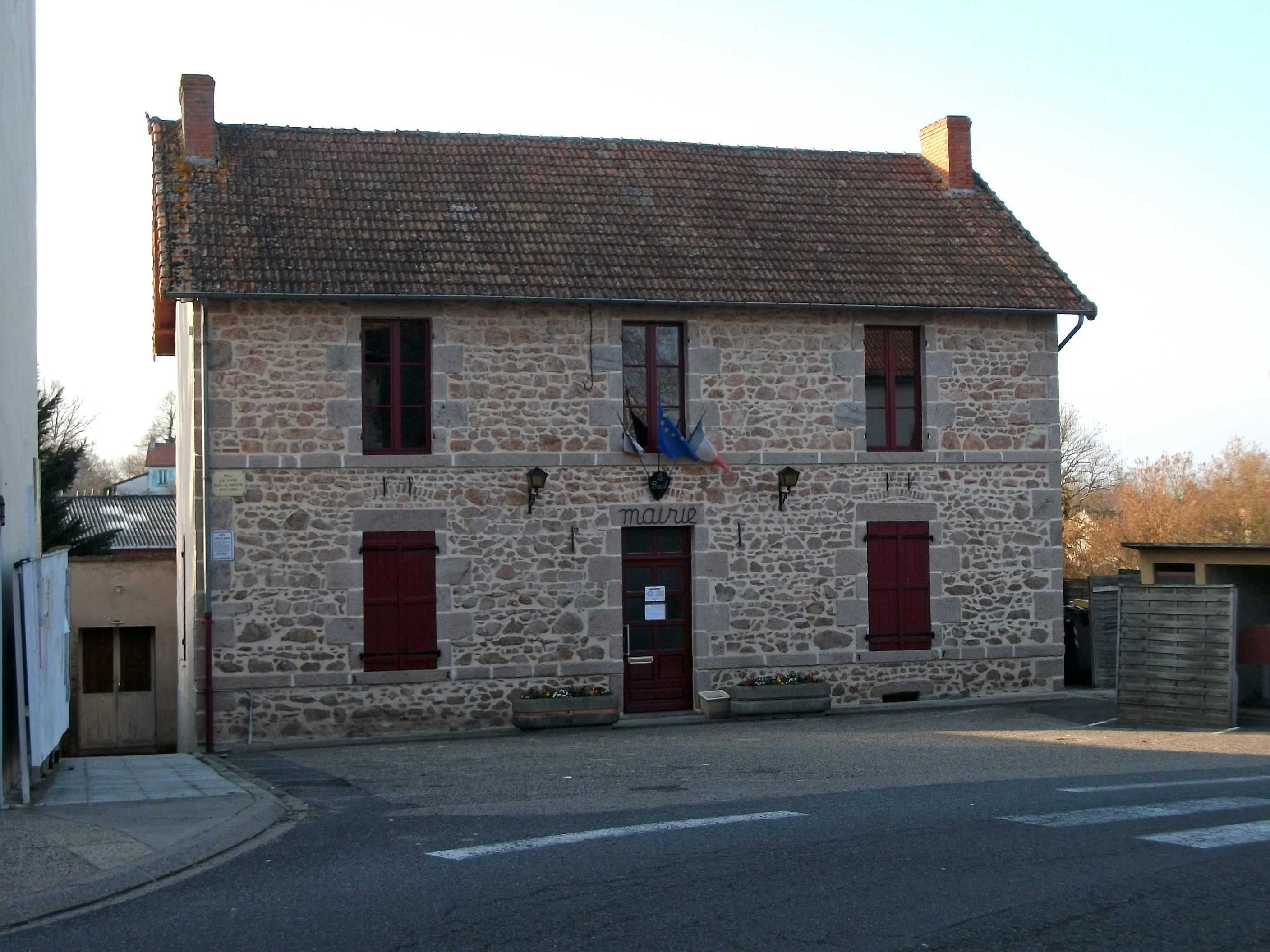
- Town hall

- Coat of arms
- Location of Le Breuil
- Location within France Location within Auvergne-Rhône-Alpes
- Coordinates: 46°11′02″N 3°39′33″E
- Country: France
- Region: Auvergne-Rhône-Alpes
- Department: Allier
- Arrondissement: Vichy
- Canton: Lapalisse
- Intercommunality: Pays de Lapalisse

Government
  - Mayor (2020–2026): Jacky Perrot
- Area^{1}: 34.55 km^{2} (13.34 sq mi)
- Elevation: 347 m (1,138 ft)
- Highest elevation: 510 m (1,670 ft)
- Lowest elevation: 290 m (950 ft)
- Population (2023): 524
  - Density: 15.2/km^{2} (39.3/sq mi)
- Demonym(s): Breuillois (en/fr); Brogelians (en); Brogéliens (fr)
- Time zone: UTC+01:00 (CET)
  - Summer (DST): UTC+02:00 (CEST)
- INSEE/Postal code: 03042 /03120
- Website: lebreuil03.fr (in French)
- ^{1} French Land Register data, which excludes lakes, ponds, glaciers > 1 km^{2} (0.386 sq mi or 247 acres) and river estuaries.

Le Breuil (French pronunciation: [lə bʁœj]; Occitan: Lo Bruelh) is a commune in the Allier department in central France.

== Population ==
Its inhabitants are called Breuillois or Brogelians / Brogéliens in French.

Historical population
Year	Pop.	±% p.a.
1968	805	—
1975	680	−2.38%
1982	613	−1.47%
1990	571	−0.88%
1999	553	−0.36%
2007	552	−0.02%
2012	550	−0.07%
2017	532	−0.66%
2023	524	−0.25%
Source: INSEE

== See also ==
- Communes of the Allier department
