= Lapalisse =

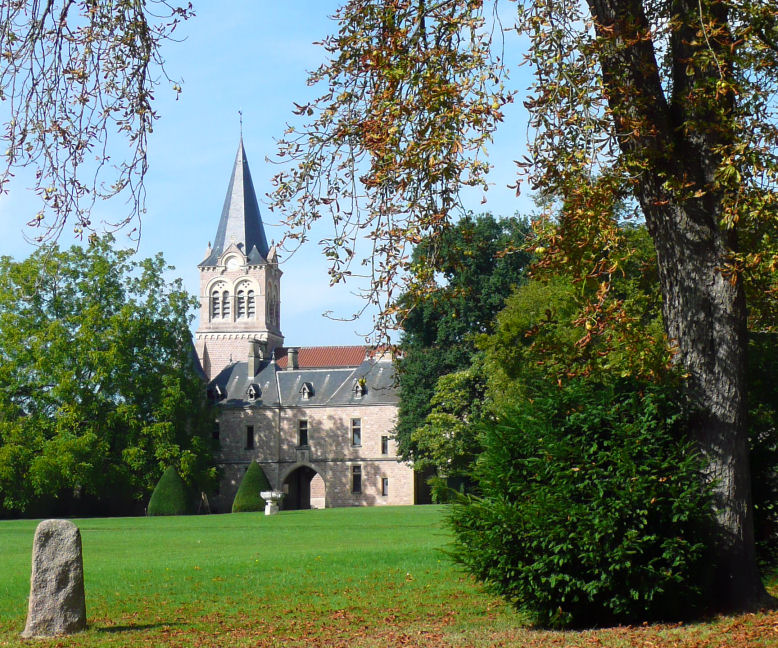
- The church of Lapalisse seen from the castle park.

- Coat of arms
- Location of Lapalisse
- Location within France Location within Auvergne-Rhône-Alpes
- Coordinates: 46.2502777778°N 3.63805555556°E
- Country: France
- Region: Auvergne-Rhône-Alpes
- Department: Allier
- Arrondissement: Vichy
- Canton: Lapalisse
- Intercommunality: CC Pays de Lapalisse

Government
  - Mayor (2026–32): Stéphanie Chervin
- Area^{1}: 33.01 km^{2} (12.75 sq mi)
- Highest elevation: 465 m (1,526 ft)
- Lowest elevation: 264 m (866 ft)
- Population (2023): 3,138
  - Density: 95.06/km^{2} (246.2/sq mi)
- Demonym: Lapalissois
- Time zone: UTC+01:00 (CET)
  - Summer (DST): UTC+02:00 (CEST)
- INSEE/Postal code: 03138 /03120
- Website: ville-lapalisse.fr
- ^{1} French Land Register data, which excludes lakes, ponds, glaciers > 1 km^{2} (0.386 sq mi or 247 acres) and river estuaries.

Lapalisse (French pronunciation: [lapalis]) is a French commune located in the department of Allier in the region of Auvergne-Rhône-Alpes.

The commune is labeled a Village étape (Stopover Village) since 2006 and is part of the association Les Plus Beaux Détours de France (The Most Beautiful Detours in France). It is also recognized as a "flowered town" with two flowers and has been the patron town of the Aviso Commandant Blaison of the French Navy since 1981.

== Geography ==
=== Location ===
Lapalisse is located in the eastern part of the Allier department, in the northern part of the Auvergne-Rhône-Alpes region, near Vichy. The town is situated at the crossroads of several important communication routes, which has historically made it a strategic passage point.

Six other communes border Lapalisse:

- Barrais-Bussolles
- Billezois
- Périgny
- Saint-Prix
- Servilly
- Varennes-sur-Tèche

=== Hydrography ===
The commune is crossed by the Besbre River, which has an average annual flow rate of 6 cubic metres per second (210 cu ft/s) at this point in its course. This river has shaped the local landscape and has been the source of several historic floods, notably that of 1846 which severely damaged the lower part of the town.

=== Climate ===
In 2010, the climate of the commune was classified as a degraded oceanic climate of the plains of Central and Northern France, according to a study by CNRS based on data covering the period 1971-2000. In 2020, Météo-France published a typology of climates in metropolitan France in which the commune is in a transition zone between the altered oceanic climate and the mountain climate or mountain margin climate and is in the Central and northern foothills of the Massif Central climate region, characterized by dry air in summer and good sunshine.

For the period 1971-2000, the average annual temperature was 11.1 °C (52.0 °F), with an annual thermal amplitude of 16.7 °C (62.1 °F). The average annual rainfall was 843 millimetres (33.2 in), with 10.8 days (930 ks) of precipitation in January and 7.8 days (670 ks) in July. For the period 1991-2020, the average annual temperature observed at the nearest Météo-France weather station, in the commune of Arfeuilles 12 kilometres (7.5 mi) away as the crow flies, was 11.2 °C (52.2 °F) and the average annual rainfall was 951.6 millimetres (37.46 in). For the future, the commune's climate parameters estimated for 2050 under different scenarios of greenhouse gas emissions can be viewed on a dedicated website published by Météo-France in November 2022.

== Urban planning ==
=== Typology ===
As of 1 January 2024, Lapalisse is categorized as a rural township, according to the new municipal density grid with 7 levels defined by Insee in 2022. It belongs to the urban unit of Lapalisse, an intra-departmental agglomeration of which it is the central city. Furthermore, the commune is part of the attraction area of Lapalisse, of which it is the central commune. (Note: The concept of attraction area of a city replaced the former concept of urban area in October 2020, to allow for consistent comparisons with other countries in the European Union) This area, which includes 9 communes, is categorized among areas with fewer than 50000 inhabitants.

=== Land use ===
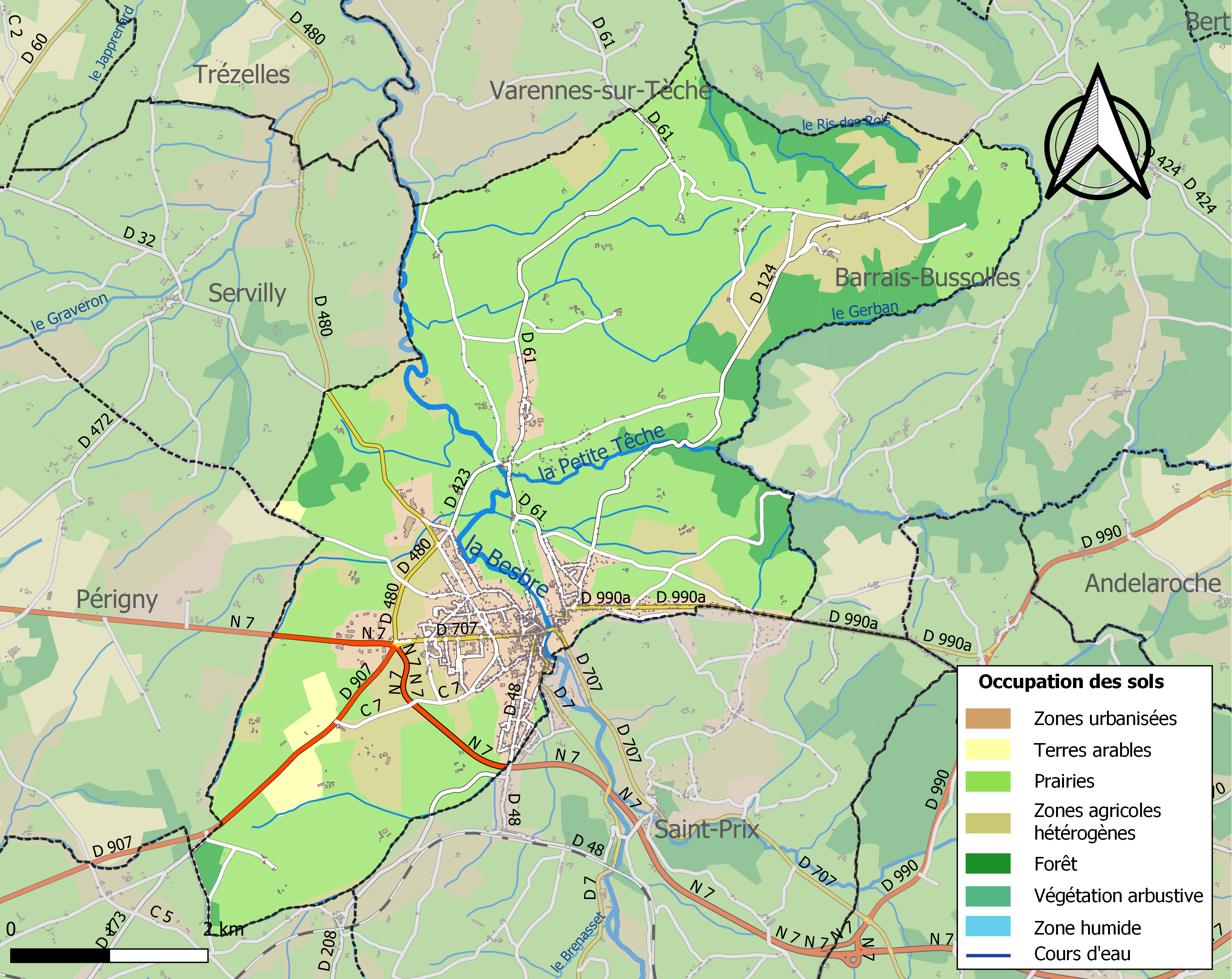
Map of infrastructure and land use in the commune in 2018 (CLC).

The land use of the commune, as shown by the European biophysical land use database Corine Land Cover (CLC), is marked by the importance of agricultural territories (79.1% in 2018), down from 1990 (80%). The detailed distribution in 2018 is as follows: meadows (63.4%), heterogeneous agricultural areas (13.8%), forests (10.7%), urbanized areas (8.1%), industrial or commercial zones and communication networks (2.1%), arable land (1.8%).

The IGN also provides an online tool to compare the evolution over time of land use in the commune (or in territories at different scales). Several time periods are accessible in the form of maps or aerial photographs: the Cassini map (1), the état-major map (1820-1866) and the current period (1950 to present). (Note: IGN. "Evolution of land use in the commune on old maps and aerial photographs". remonterletemps.ign.fr. To compare the evolution between two dates, click on the bottom of the vertical dividing line and move it to the right or left. To compare two other maps, choose the maps in the windows at the top left of the screen.)

=== Transport and communication routes ===
==== Road networks ====
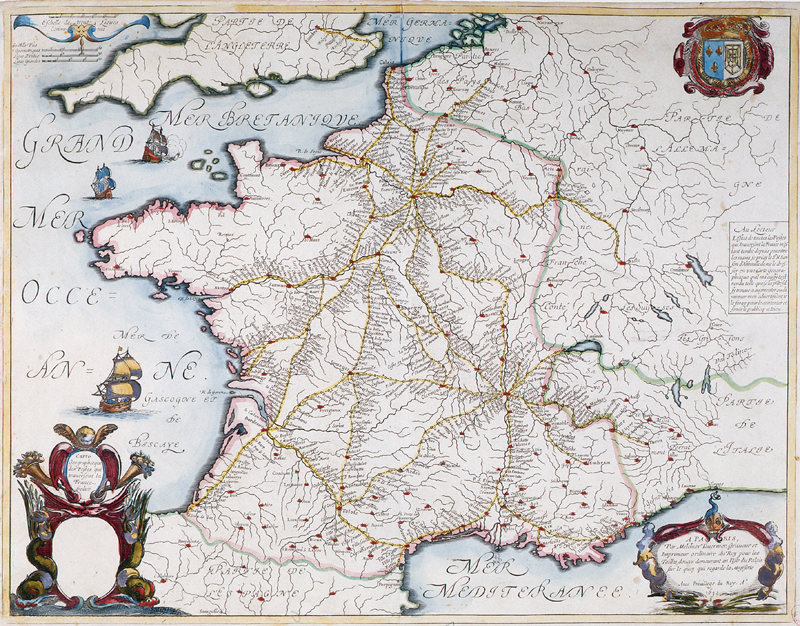
Main mail coach routes in France, map published in 1632, by the famous cartographer Nicolas Sanson.

Dating back to ancient times, the city of Lapalisse was a very important road city, from which it derived great economic prosperity from its agricultural and commercial exchanges with neighboring provinces (Roannais, Forez, Brionnais, etc.). In 1903, the sports journalist Henri Desgrange, creator of the famous Tour de France, chose to route the First Tour de France cycling race through La Palisse.

Until October 2006, the town was crossed by the Route Nationale 7 connecting Moulins and Varennes-sur-Allier to the west and then north on one hand, and toward Roanne and Lyon to the east and then south on the other, with vibrations from heavy trucks crossing the railroad crossing even causing cracks in the castle walls. Since that date, the town has been bypassed by an expressway-type route with two of 2 lanes and the old route has been downgraded to the departmental road network (RD 707).

In 2010, a western bypass was constructed by the Allier department (RD 480). This same road continues north toward Jaligny-sur-Besbre and Dompierre-sur-Besbre. South of this bypass, RD 480 leads to a roundabout with RN 7, RD 707 and RD 907 leading to Magnet, Cusset and Vichy.

To the east, RD 990 and RD 990a serve the eastern part of the department (toward Montaiguët-en-Forez and Marcigny).

The local service roads are:

- RD 7, leading to Saint-Prix, Le Breuil and the Bourbonnais mountains (Le Mayet-de-Montagne);
- RD 47;
- RD 48 leading from the town center to the train station in the commune of Saint-Prix;
- RD 61 leading to Varennes-sur-Tèche;
- RD 124 leading to Bert;
- RD 208 leading to Saint-Christophe;
- RD 423, connecting RD 61 to the western bypass (RD 480).

==== Rail transport ====
The Moret - Veneux-les-Sablons - Lyon-Perrache railway line passes through the neighboring commune of Saint-Prix, where a SNCF station is located. It was closed to passenger service in 2006 to reduce the travel time of rail services between the stations of Clermont-Ferrand and Lyon-Perrache.

== Etymology ==
The name Lapalisse first appears on an ancient map from the 12th century (in 1165) referring to a chapel (Capella di Palicia). The family of the first lords of La Palice established themselves there at this time after having borne the name of the Lords of Lubié, of La Motte des Noyers.

The spelling has varied over the centuries between "La Palice" and "La Palisse". Until the French Revolution, the name was written as two words. It was in 1789 that the spelling "Lapalisse" was definitively adopted.

== History ==
=== Antiquity ===
The first trace of occupation at the place called Lubié or Lubillet predates by several centuries the definitive establishment of the former Lipidiacus (La Palisse), on the banks of the Besbre River.

Ancient pottery workshop of Lubié

At Lubié there is a Gallo-Roman pottery workshop. The style of BANUUS III is one of the most characteristic creations of this workshop.

The Chez-Duret site, in the southwest of the commune, was the subject of a preventive excavation in 1996 as part of the development of the bypass by National Route 7.

=== Middle Ages and Renaissance ===
In 1429, Charles, Duke of Bourbon, purchased the seigneurial domain of La Palice from Jeanne de Châtillon and resold it for 6,000 gold écus in 1430 to Jacques I, one of the last two representatives of the Chabannes family, which dates back to the year 1000. This sum was partly financed by the ransoms of English knights captured during the siege of Orléans. Jacques I and his brother Antoine, Count of Dammartin, were among the great leaders who, like Joan of Arc and at her side, contributed to the defeat of the English during the Hundred Years' War.

=== From the Late Middle Ages to the French Revolution ===
What might the small town of La Palisse have looked like at the beginning of the 1? Probably the major works of redevelopment of the city with the razing of the old medieval ramparts of the city and the enlargement of the old castle, left at the beginning of this building revival, to travelers passing through, an impression of disorder and insalubrity? Coming from his native French Flanders, Jacques Lesaige, a wealthy draper merchant from Douai, setting out at Easter 1518 for a pilgrimage to the Holy Land, notes in his Memoirs having crossed the small city on the banks of the Besbre:

"From Varenne to La Palisse, four leagues. It is a small ugly (layde) and dirty (orde) town. There is a small castle. We dined there and I spent (despendis) 8 groats (gros)"

Being devout, the Douai draper Jacques Lesage, who was then heading to Rome with his four companions, probably during his itinerary, dined and stayed at the hostellerie du Puits de l'Image in La Palisse, a hotel facing the old Royal Road (current rue de la Liberté). Skirting the structures of the old fortress of La Palisse, one can imagine what was then all the discomfort and insalubrity of this hilly street, composed during the bad season, of stones and mire.

In his famous Guide des Chemins de France published in 1552, the learned scholar Charles Estienne, mentioned with precision the various stages of the old royal roads, crossing the provinces of the kingdom of France, including those of Bourbonnais, which he calls after Moulins, the "Grand Chemin de Lyon" (Great Road to Lyon).

Always a road city, La Palisse, located on one of the most important roads in France (Paris-Lyon), experienced in the 1 a prosperous attractiveness through its flows of travelers frequenting its numerous inns, through the passage of Mail coaches (post horses) and its post relay where the authority of a postmaster was exercised over the postilions. At the beginning of the 1, sieur Pierre Mareschal, postmaster in 1612 at La Palisse, also served as "Chevaucheur du Roi" (King's Rider).

Taking the great royal road from Paris to Lyon, the Parisian writer and traveler Jean-Jacques Bouchard (1606-1641), in his journey from Paris to Rome made in 1630, crosses the small city of La Palisse; like the Florentine Benvenuto Cellini a century earlier, he gives, in his Confessions, a picturesque and not very reassuring portrait of the region, a country then traversed by plunderers and highwaymen:

"...La Palisse, 2 leagues [from Parigny], small strong town situated on a very steep mountain. There is an old fortress. One must leave early, in order to pass by day the valley of La Palisse, which is full of woods and commanded by mountains, from where the robbers who are always in good number in this forest, discover from afar the passersby and come to assail them unexpectedly; this passage was then all full of soldiers disbanded from the army of Italy, who nevertheless did no violence out of respect for the Marquis of Effiat, superintendent of finances, who passed that same afternoon in a litter with his wife. (...)"

An ordinance of 16 December 1666 by Monseigneur d'Estaing, authorizes the foundation in La Palisse of a convent of hospital nuns. This act of foundation was confirmed shortly after, by letters patent given by King Louis XIV at Compiègne in June 1667, providing regulations for the establishment of hospital nuns in the town of La Palice, registered on 14 August 1668. This convent-hospice, named "La Providence", was founded under the impetus of Marshal Claude Maximilien de La Guiche, Lord of La Palisse, by Augustinian sisters from Riom.

=== 18th to 19th century: the beginnings of an agricultural and artisanal economy of great importance ===
In 1718, the historian and geographer Jean-Aimar Piganiol de La Force in his Description générale de la France mentioned the small city of Bourbonnais, of which he gives this brief description:

"La Palice is a small town considerable for its Fairs & its Markets & for the passage of those who go from Paris to Lyon. There is only a lord's justice; its castle is ancient and well built."

The entire town rebelled against the gabelle, a particularly hated tax, in 1736. On 11 October, the gabelous (tax collectors) were attacked, chased, and forced to flee over the rooftops. The municipality did not intervene, quite the contrary. The Farm wanted a trial: everyone dragged out the investigation and the trial did not take place until 1740. In the end, they pleaded confusion between soldiers, smugglers, gabelous, and passersby, who all looked alike, and things remained there, the intendant being unable to have them condemned. According to Jean Nicolas, this episode testifies to the solidarity that could manifest within a community.

La Palisse enjoyed a very great reputation in France for the importance of its fairs and markets, especially for the very lucrative grain trade. Already in 1785, the economist Jean-Baptiste Antoine Malisset d'Hertereau noted, in his economic analysis work, two considerable fairs of exceptional duration, already confirmed previously since 1745 in the official data of the Royal Almanac:

"Palice (La) in Bourbonnois. Fairs, September 7 for three days & September 17 for six days."

In this veritable world dictionary of political economy from the late 18th century for the use of merchants, traders, shipowners, industrialists, financiers, etc., author Malisset d'Hertereau did not fail to mention also about the small Bourbonnais city:

"(...) Palice (La): Town of France in Bourbonnois, on the Besbre 15 leagues from Moulins. It is remarkable only for the solidity of the tall boots, which are made there in large quantity and part of which is sent to Paris. (...)".

The geographer Antoine-Augustin Bruzen de La Martinière confirmed in 1737 in his encyclopedist works these same data and noted very rightly in this regard:

"..(...) This town is nevertheless considerable for its fairs which are twelve in number, for its markets which are held every week, for the passage of those who go from Paris to Lyon; it is also renowned for the good boots that are made there. (...)"

In the middle of the 1, France experienced floods of its main rivers and waterways reaching an unprecedented severity. La Palisse, crossed by the "peaceful" Besbre river, was not spared and was also severely damaged by the great historic flood of October 1846.

"At La Palisse, on October 17, all the inhabitants were in the greatest consternation. The waters of the Besbre rose to a prodigious height and instantly submerged the entire lower part of the town and its suburbs. In living memory, no such flood and spectacle had been seen. At about six o'clock, cries of distress of unfortunate suburb dwellers, upstream of the bridge, were heard; they had taken refuge in their attics to avoid certain death."

After the coup d'état of December 2, 1851, the inhabitants of the cantons of Luneau, Le Donjon and Jaligny rose up and seized Lapalisse after some fighting (one gendarme killed). But the news of the success of the coup d'état led to the dispersal of the insurgents. The repression was severe: the three cantons that rose up totaled about 350 arrests.

=== Contemporary period ===
Significant changes took place in the 18th century: in 1753, the Grand Chemin de Lyon was laid out, leading to the destruction of part of the ramparts, as can be seen in the Billaudy and Liberty streets.

The town developed from the original nucleus at the foot of the castle following the main transportation routes (RN7, RD243, RD61, RD990, RD7, RD48), thus giving rise to a star-shaped urbanization.

Until 24 August 1941, Lapalisse was the subprefecture of arrondissement. The administration of the French State then transferred the subprefecture to Vichy.

== Politics and administration ==
Lapalisse is the chief town (then centralizing bureau since March 2015) of a canton covering, since the cantonal redistricting, the southeast of the Allier department and the Bourbonnais mountains to the gates of Vichy.

=== Political trends and results ===
In the 2012 legislative elections, the incumbent deputy Gérard Charasse was elected in the new 3rd constituency of Allier. In the commune, he received 59.02% of the votes cast. 59.10% of voters turned out.

In the 2014 municipal elections, the incumbent mayor Jacques de Chabannes, a direct descendant of the family of Chabannes de La Palice, was re-elected on a miscellaneous left list, the only one to run. 57.92% of voters turned out.

In the 2015 departmental elections, the pair (radical left) composed of Martine Arnaud and Jacques De Chabannes received 54.43% of the votes cast. 62.83% of voters turned out.

== Population and society ==
=== Demographics ===
The inhabitants of the commune are called the Lapalissois and Lapalissoises.

Historical population

| Year | Pop. | ±% p.a. |
|---|---|---|
| 1793 | 2,409 | — |
| 1800 | 1,665 | −5.14% |
| 1806 | 1,890 | +2.14% |
| 1821 | 2,061 | +0.58% |
| 1831 | 2,245 | +0.86% |
| 1836 | 2,286 | +0.36% |
| 1841 | 2,401 | +0.99% |
| 1846 | 2,670 | +2.15% |
| 1851 | 2,696 | +0.19% |
| 1856 | 2,665 | −0.23% |
| 1861 | 2,801 | +1.00% |
| 1866 | 2,821 | +0.14% |
| 1872 | 2,771 | −0.30% |
| 1876 | 2,746 | −0.23% |
| 1881 | 2,900 | +1.10% |
| 1886 | 2,952 | +0.36% |
| 1891 | 2,904 | −0.33% |
| 1896 | 2,941 | +0.25% |
| 1901 | 2,847 | −0.65% |

| Year | Pop. | ±% p.a. |
|---|---|---|
| 1906 | 2,971 | +0.86% |
| 1911 | 2,913 | −0.39% |
| 1921 | 2,732 | −0.64% |
| 1926 | 2,958 | +1.60% |
| 1931 | 3,158 | +1.32% |
| 1936 | 3,234 | +0.48% |
| 1946 | 3,260 | +0.08% |
| 1954 | 3,182 | −0.30% |
| 1962 | 3,349 | +0.64% |
| 1968 | 3,528 | +0.87% |
| 1975 | 3,605 | +0.31% |
| 1982 | 3,553 | −0.21% |
| 1990 | 3,603 | +0.17% |
| 1999 | 3,332 | −0.87% |
| 2007 | 3,196 | −0.52% |
| 2012 | 3,122 | −0.47% |
| 2017 | 3,123 | +0.01% |
| 2023 | 3,138 | +0.08% |

Source: EHESS and INSEE (1968-2023)

=== Cultural events and festivities ===
- The bouchon de Lapalisse (Lapalisse traffic jam). Since the opening of the bypass of the town by National Route 7 in 2006, a biennial festive event brings together enthusiasts of 1950s-1960s cars who recreate the legendary traffic jam that occurred in the town during every holiday departure, or even every weekend. Between 200 and 300 vehicles, mainly passenger cars, are thus presented, to the great joy of lovers of beautifully designed bodywork.
- Shows and sound and light shows are regularly organized at the castle, bringing to life the soul of these historic stones.

=== Education ===
Lapalisse is part of the Academy of Clermont-Ferrand. It manages the Arc en Ciel public nursery school and the G. Giraud public elementary school.

Students continue their education at the Lucien-Colon middle school, managed by the General Council of Allier. High school students attend school in Cusset, at the Albert-Londres high school.

== Economy ==
The economy of Lapalisse is based on several sectors:

- Industry, particularly the South Allier industrial zone, which contributes significantly to the economic vitality of the commune.
- Commerce, with various establishments meeting the needs of the local population and surrounding communes.
- Tourism, thanks to the Château de La Palice, the "Village étape" label, and cultural events such as the "bouchon de Lapalisse."
- Agriculture, which occupies a significant part of the communal territory (more than 79% according to Corine Land Cover).

The commune also benefits from its position on important road axes, particularly with the passage of the RN7 which, even though it now bypasses the town center, continues to bring significant economic activity.

== Local culture and heritage ==
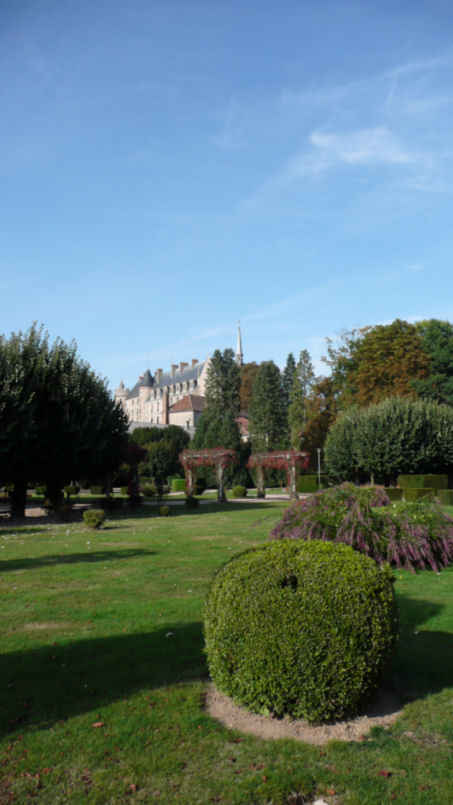
View of Lapalisse with the Château de La Palice.

=== Places and monuments ===
- Château de La Palice on the bank of the Besbre. In a castle extensively remodeled and completed during the Renaissance, round towers and a fragment of a 13th-century enclosure were reused in a 15th-century castle. This castle, which has belonged to the Chabannes family since 1430, has been open to the public since 1952. Significant restoration work has been estimated at 4 million euros, particularly for the stables dating from 1613, for which a fundraising campaign was launched in 2024.
- Former Hostellerie du Puits de l'Image (15th century), with a beautiful door and a fine staircase from the Gothic period. (listed as a Historic Monument)
- Main building and the only remaining tower of part of the old town ramparts (14th-15th centuries).
- Former Hospice or Hospital of La Palisse of the Augustinian sisters, founded in 1656 by Claude-Maximilien de La Guiche, Count of La Palice and Governor of Bourbonnais, son of Jean-François de La Guiche, Marshal of France. (17th century)
- Former Inn called L'Écu de France.
- Art en Marche Museum (installed in the former Barthelot leather factory) dedicated to popular contemporary art and art brut.
- Church of Saint-John the Baptist from the 19th century built on the model of Romanesque churches. It has an organ by the maker Paul Férat (1879).
- Chapel of Saint-Leger of the Château de Lapalisse.
- Former hall known as La Grenette (19th century) near the Champ de Foire located in the upper town. This former grain hall is the last witness, along with the remains of the Town Mill, of what still recalls the opulence of the grain markets of La Palisse at the time of its economic splendor. Today, this beautiful building, after renovation work, has been converted into a communal festival hall.
- Former town mill (19th century), immortalized by an engraving by the Rouargue brothers.
- Monument to the dead of the Great War 1914-1918. This monument represents a "Poilu" (French soldier) of 14-18 trampling the Germanic eagle under his feet, a remarkable work by the sculptor Gaston Petit, a native of Saône-et-Loire, a former student of the National School of Fine Arts of Paris, where he was the student of master sculptor Jean-Antoine Injalbert. This superb work is probably only partly by the bronze sculptor Gaston Petit, since it was co-signed by Louis Bertola who also contributed? Given the expensive costs demanded by Petit (41,200 Francs), the project to erect this memorial, which was initially conflictual with the city hall of Auguste Coche, was finally inaugurated on 31 July 1922 in the presence of Albert Peyronnet, senator of Allier and Minister of Labor in the Poincaré government, and the Under-Secretary of State for Public Instruction Gaston Vidal. During this ministerial visit, Mr. Peyronnet also inaugurated the monument dedicated to the victims of the coup d'état of 2 December 1851, as well as the new Hospice-Hospital of Lapalisse. The base and column pedestal of the "Poilu" statue of Lapalisse were made of pink granite from Droiturier.
- Monument to the victims of the coup d'état of 2 December 1851 (upper town).

=== Notable people ===
- Jacques II de Chabannes de La Palice, Lord of La Palisse was born in 1463. Companion in arms of the knight Pierre Terrail de Bayard and Gaston of Foix, Duke of Nemours, he was a counselor of the King's House and a senior military officer during the Italian campaigns (1501-1525), where he served under three kings: Charles VIII, Louis XII, and Francis I. In 1509, he was created Grand Master of France and made Marshal of France in 1515 by Francis I. A valiant soldier, Marshal de Chabannes de La Palice was killed gloriously in Lombardy in February 1525 during the sixth Italian War, following the disastrous and memorable Battle of Pavia (1525) which was unfortunately engaged against his advice.
- Jean-François de La Guiche (1569-1632) probably born at the Château de Lapalisse, was lord of Saint-Gérand, count of La Palice and governor of Bourbonnais. The lord of La Guiche made several transformations to the Château de La Palice, the most important of which was the construction of the outbuildings (stables) erected in 1613. He was appointed Marshal of France on 31 December 1619 during the reign of Louis XIII. Monsieur de Saint-Géran died in his Château de La Palice on 2 December 1632.
- René Villars de la Brosse-Raquin, son of a simple Ship-of-the-line lieutenant was born around 1704 in Lapalisse (he seems to have been lord of Gléné?) and died on 19 June 1776 in Rochefort, was a French naval officer and aristocrat. Having fought in several Franco-English naval wars given by the French Royal Navy of King Louis XV, he distinguished himself with varying fortunes in several conflicts, notably during the famous Seven Years' War. In 1771, he was elevated to the dignity of chef d'escadre of the naval armies (rear admiral) and was decorated at the end of his career as a senior officer in 1775 with the cordon of commander in the Royal and Military Order of Saint Louis. According to his last wishes, Sieur René Villars de La Brosse Raquin (who died at 71) wished before Eternity to keep "an anchorage point" with the small town of La Palice in Bourbonnois.
- Claude Montal, was born on 28 July 1800 in a modest family in Lapalisse and died in Paris on 7 March 1865. A classmate of Louis Braille at the National Institute for Blind Youth, Montal opened as early as 1836 in this institution, a 1st piano tuning course, the year he published his 1st Complete Treatise on Piano Tuning, dedicated to Camille Pleyel, then the most famous of Parisian makers. From 1834, having regained complete but very risky independence, he became a tuner and received in 1851 as a piano maker the medal of the Legion of Honor decorated by the Prince-President himself (the future Napoleon III) in the aftermath of the first Universal Exhibition. In 1853, Montal became the official supplier to the French Imperial House on the occasion of the Emperor's marriage to Eugenie de Montijo. After having collaborated from its beginnings to the foundation of the Institute for Young Blind People in Rio de Janeiro, Claude Montal was appointed in 1854 piano maker to Dom Pedro II, the last emperor of Brazil.

=== Heraldry ===
Malte-Brun, in La France illustrée (1882), reports two different blazons for the arms of the town of Lapalisse, the second being that of the arms in force:

| Vert, a saltire or. |
| Gules, five narrowed pales argent (The "narrowed pales" are actually vergettes, but the blazon wants to emphasize the aspect of "canting arms".) |

== See also ==
- Lapalissade
- Communes of the Allier department
