= Château de Curton =

French castle and lordship in Gironde

Coordinates: 44°48′43″N 0°15′4″W

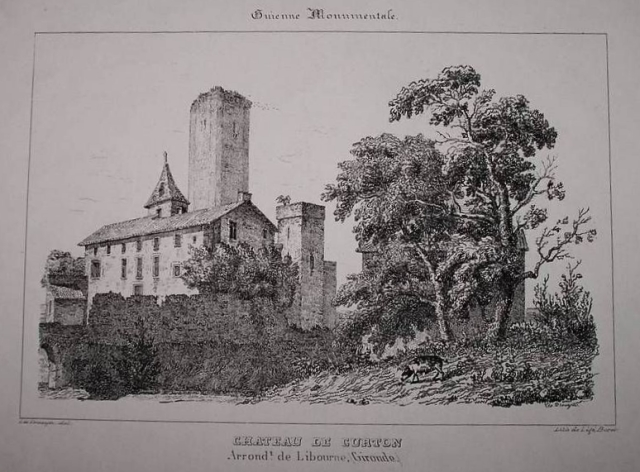
Château de Curton

Château de Curton is a castle located in the commune of Daignac in the department of Gironde. It is situated on the edge of the town of Tizac-de-Curton, which takes its name from the first seigneurs (lords) of Curton. It is a Bordeaux winery in the Entre-Deux-Mers wine region producing wines classified as Bordeaux AOC.

== History ==
The earliest member of the Curton family documented in official texts is Raimond de Curton appearing in the 11th century, appearing as a Lord from the beginning of the 12th century. From the end of the 12th century, Regin de Curton made ties with the English Royal Family, signing a treaty in London. In the 13th century, the Curton Castle and its Lord, Amanieu de Curton appear in the records.

=== During the Hundred Years' War ===
At the beginning of the Hundred Years' War, Edward III of England asked Arnaud, Lord of Curton, to remain loyal to him and defend Guyenna against the French attacks. As a reward, he granted him jurisdiction over the four parishes around Château de Curton: Daignac, Espiet, Grézillac and Tizac de Curton.

Later, two descendants of the Lord of Curton became famous during the war, Petiton de Curton who was a knight, and Sennebrun de Curton who fought alongside Edward the Black Prince.

At the beginning of the 15th century, some sources state that the Lords of Curton went to England and are related to the present Cureton Family. The Château de Curton became the property of Louis de Beaumont before being captured by the French and was given to Jacques de Chabannes, Lord of Lapalice, who died in his new castle after becoming wounded at the Battle of Castillon.

=== French Revolution ===
Château de Curton remained the property of the Family Chabannes de Lapalice. In 1563, Curton Castle was made a marquisat for François de Chabannes. The castle was confiscated during the French Revolution and sold as national property to Citizen Rabeau. From this time, it was passed on through successive sales and weddings.

=== Present ===
Since 1926, Château de Curton has been registered as a French national monument. It is a private property.

Although there are no organized tours for visitors, a self-catering apartment is equipped inside the castle and available for guest rental.

== Winery ==
There are several types of wine produced, namely a Bordeaux red wine AOC special vintage matured in oak barrel, a Bordeaux red wine AOC, a Bordeaux Clairet AOC and a white wine.

The vineyard area, located across the villages of Daignac, Grezillac, Guillac and Lugaignac, consists of 42 hectares, of which 33 hectares are dedicated to red wine production, with the grape varieties of 85% Merlot, 10% Cabernet Sauvignon and 5% Cabernet Franc. Nine hectares dedicated to white wine consist of 94% Sémillon, 5% Sauvignon blanc and 1% Muscadelle.
