= Dompierre-sur-Besbre =

- Commune
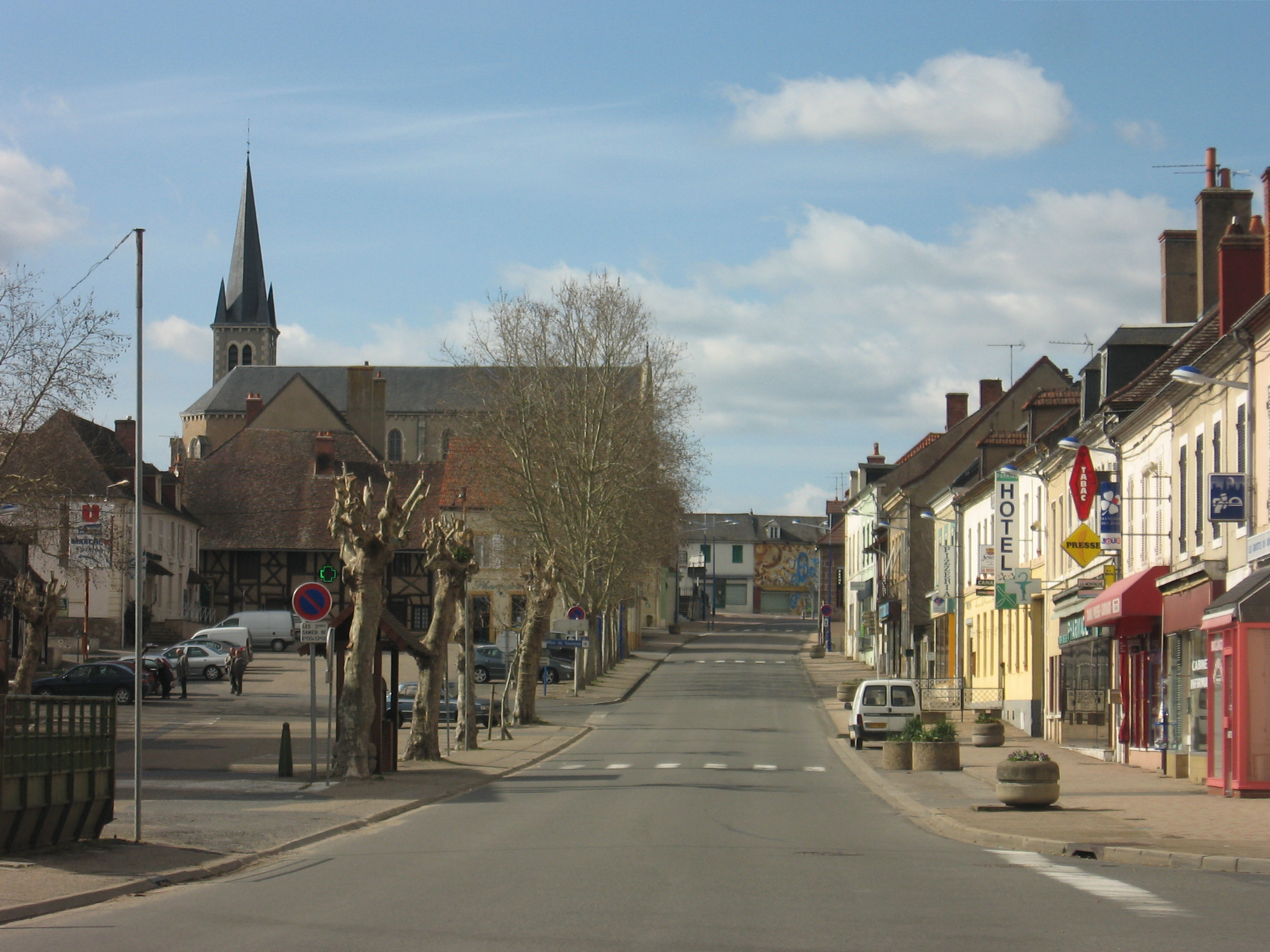
- The main road in Dompierre-sur-Besbre

- Coat of arms
- Location of Dompierre-sur-Besbre
- Location within France Location within Auvergne-Rhône-Alpes
- Coordinates: 46°31′23″N 3°40′55″E
- Country: France
- Region: Auvergne-Rhône-Alpes
- Department: Allier
- Arrondissement: Vichy
- Canton: Dompierre-sur-Besbre
- Intercommunality: Entr'Allier Besbre et Loire

Government
  - Mayor (2026–32): Véronique Voisin
- Area^{1}: 45.63 km^{2} (17.62 sq mi)
- Elevation: 216 m (709 ft)
- Highest elevation: 271 m (889 ft)
- Lowest elevation: 207 m (679 ft)
- Population (2023): 2,959
  - Density: 64.85/km^{2} (168.0/sq mi)
- Time zone: UTC+01:00 (CET)
  - Summer (DST): UTC+02:00 (CEST)
- INSEE/Postal code: 03102 /03290
- ^{1} French Land Register data, which excludes lakes, ponds, glaciers > 1 km^{2} (0.386 sq mi or 247 acres) and river estuaries.

Dompierre-sur-Besbre (French pronunciation: [dɔ̃pjɛʁ syʁ bɛbʁ], literally Dompierre on Besbre) is a commune in the Allier department in central France.

Le Pal is an animal theme park in the municipality area of Saint-Pourçain-sur-Besbre, close to Dompierre-sur-Besbre.

The commune is listed as a Village étape.

== Population ==
Historical population
Year	Pop.	±% p.a.
1968	4,031	—
1975	4,115	+0.30%
1982	4,040	−0.26%
1990	3,807	−0.74%
1999	3,477	−1.00%
2007	3,293	−0.68%
2012	3,128	−1.02%
2017	3,040	−0.57%
2023	2,959	−0.45%
Source: INSEE

== See also ==
- Communes of the Allier department
