= Andelaroche =

- Commune
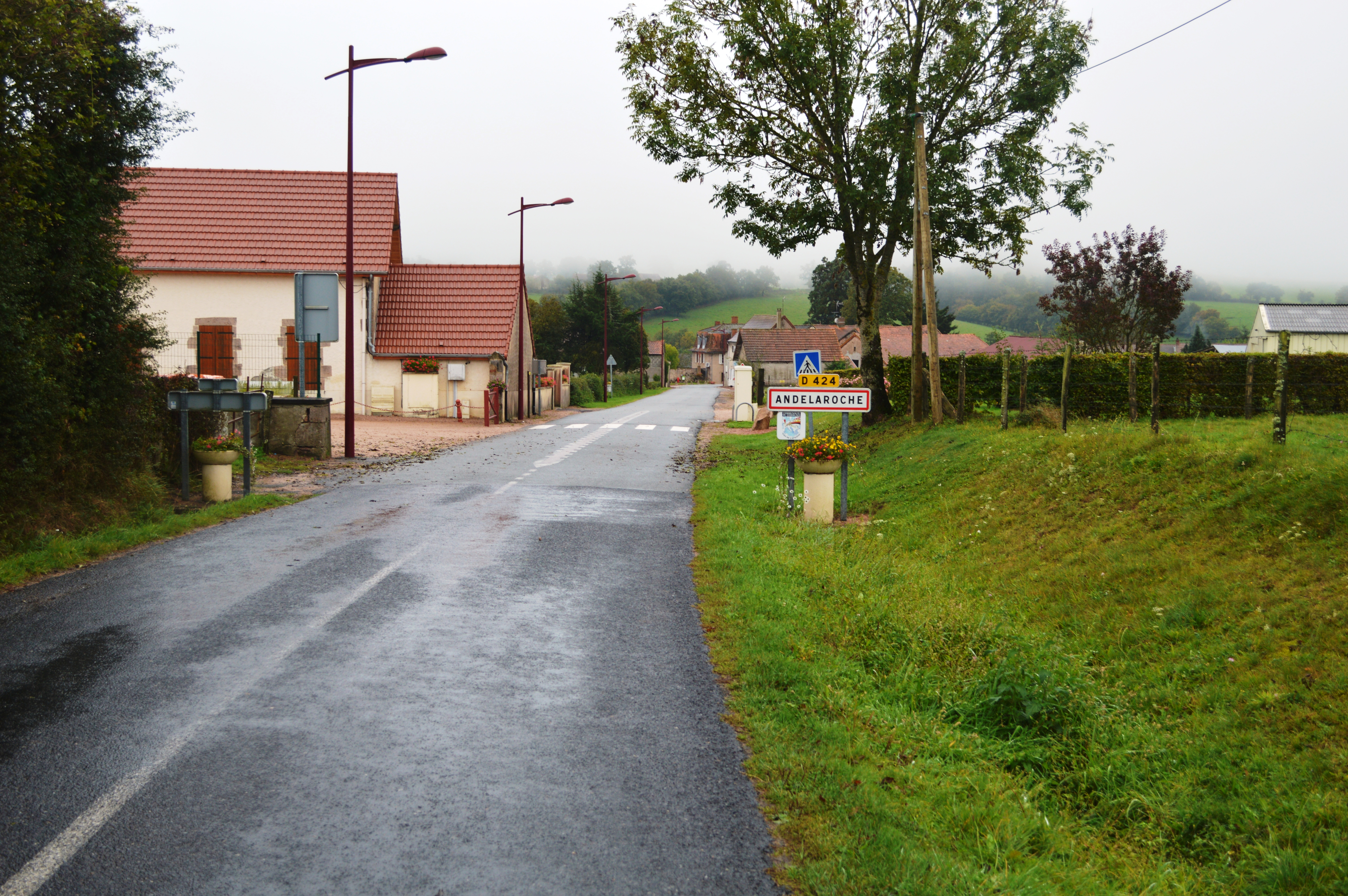
- The road into Andelaroche
- Location of Andelaroche
- Location within France Location within Auvergne-Rhône-Alpes
- Coordinates: 46°15′22″N 3°45′00″E
- Country: France
- Region: Auvergne-Rhône-Alpes
- Department: Allier
- Arrondissement: Vichy
- Canton: Lapalisse
- Intercommunality: Pays de Lapalisse

Government
  - Mayor (2026–32): Henri Cabaud
- Area^{1}: 20.28 km^{2} (7.83 sq mi)
- Elevation: 428 m (1,404 ft)
- Highest elevation: 534 m (1,752 ft)
- Lowest elevation: 338 m (1,109 ft)
- Population (2023): 214
  - Density: 10.6/km^{2} (27.3/sq mi)
- Demonym: Andelarochois
- Time zone: UTC+01:00 (CET)
  - Summer (DST): UTC+02:00 (CEST)
- INSEE/Postal code: 03004 /03120
- ^{1} French Land Register data, which excludes lakes, ponds, glaciers > 1 km^{2} (0.386 sq mi or 247 acres) and river estuaries.

Andelaroche (French pronunciation: [ɑ̃dlaʁɔʃ]) is a commune in the Allier department in the Auvergne-Rhône-Alpes region of central France.

The inhabitants of the commune are known as Andelarochois or Andelarochoises in French.

== Geography ==
Andelaroche is located some 10 kilometres (6.2 mi) east of Lapalisse and some 25 kilometres (16 mi) west of Marcigny. The D990/D994 road passes through the west of the commune from south-west to north-east. Access to the village is by the minor D424 road from Barrais-Bussolles in the north through the commune and the village then continuing south-east to Saint-Martin-d'Estreaux. The minor D470 road also goes from the village south-west to Droiturier. The commune is mostly farmland with a large forest in the south-east, the Bois de Saint Pierre in the centre, and a few isolated patches of forest towards the north.

The Andan river forms the south-western border of the commune, the Ruisseau de Maupes forms the north-western border, and the Ruisseau de l'Etang Civette forms part of the eastern border. Numerous other streams criss-cross the commune with many small lakes.

== Administration ==
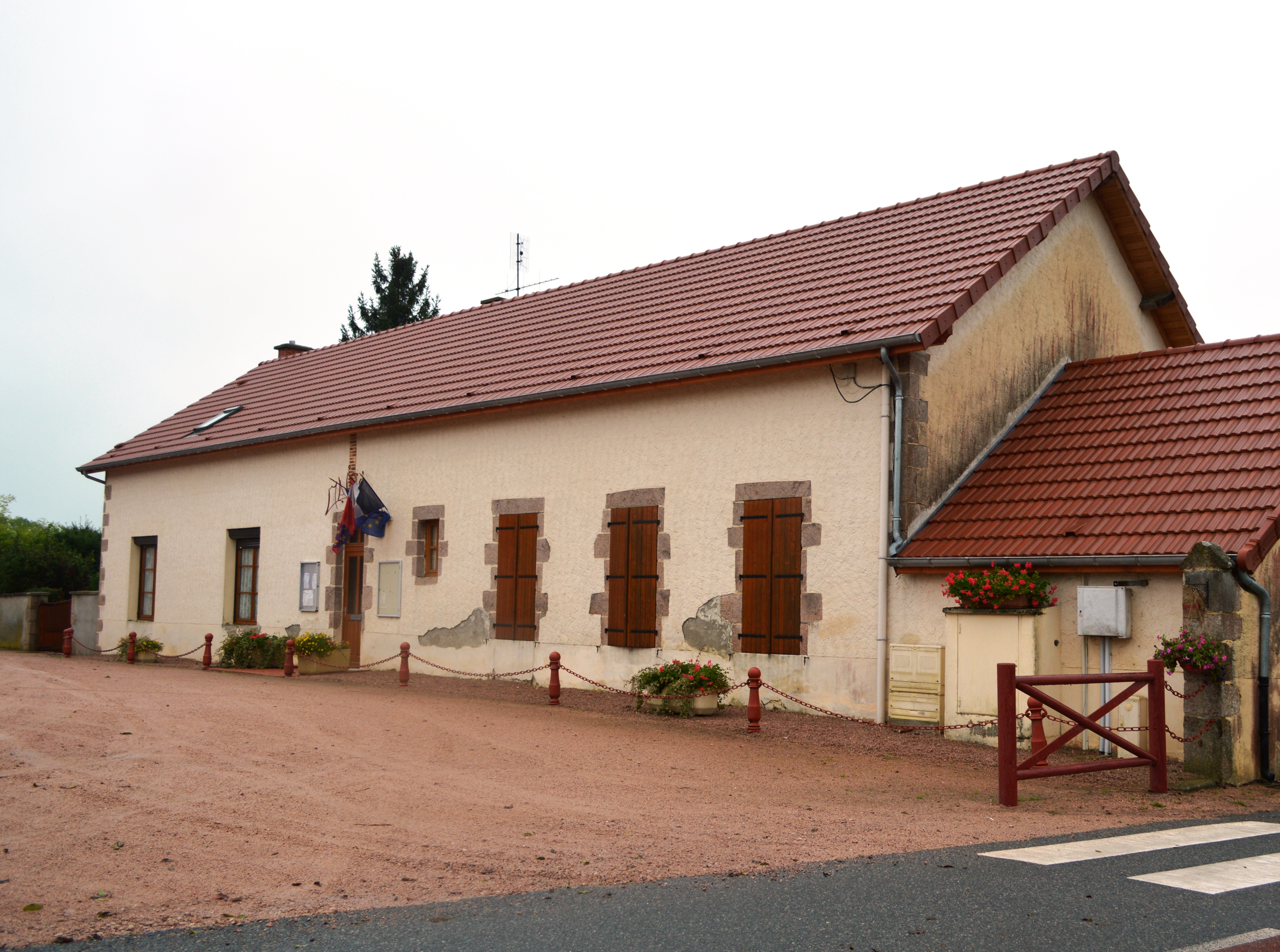
The Town Hall

List of Successive Mayors

From	To	Name	Party	Position
1898		Jules Jen Marie Dessert		
2001	2026	Pascale Richard		
2026	Current	Henri Cabaud		

== Population ==
Historical population
Year	Pop.	±% p.a.
1968	371	—
1975	357	−0.55%
1982	300	−2.45%
1990	288	−0.51%
1999	267	−0.84%
2007	285	+0.82%
2012	268	−1.22%
2017	258	−0.76%
2023	214	−3.07%
Source: INSEE

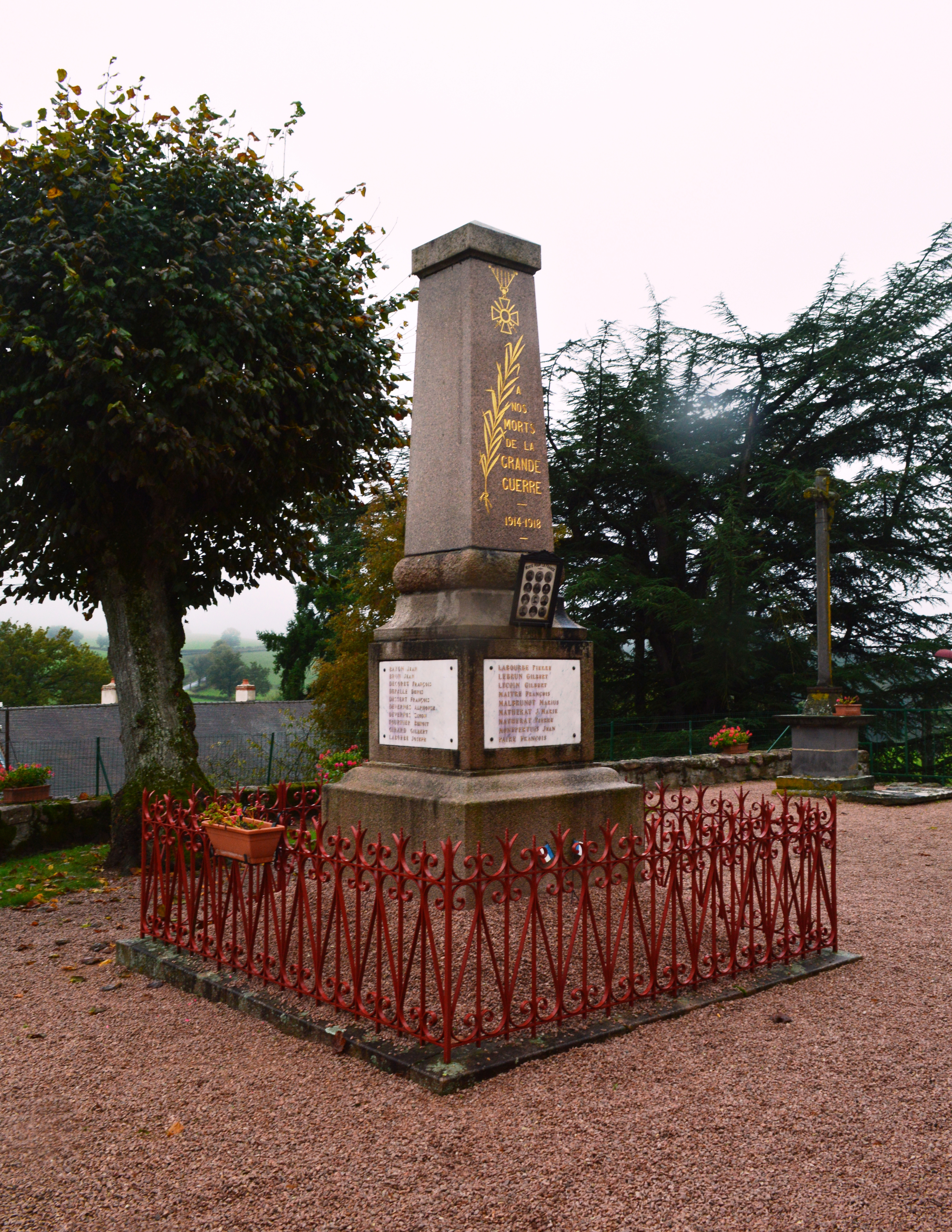
Andelaroche War Memorial

== Sites and monuments ==
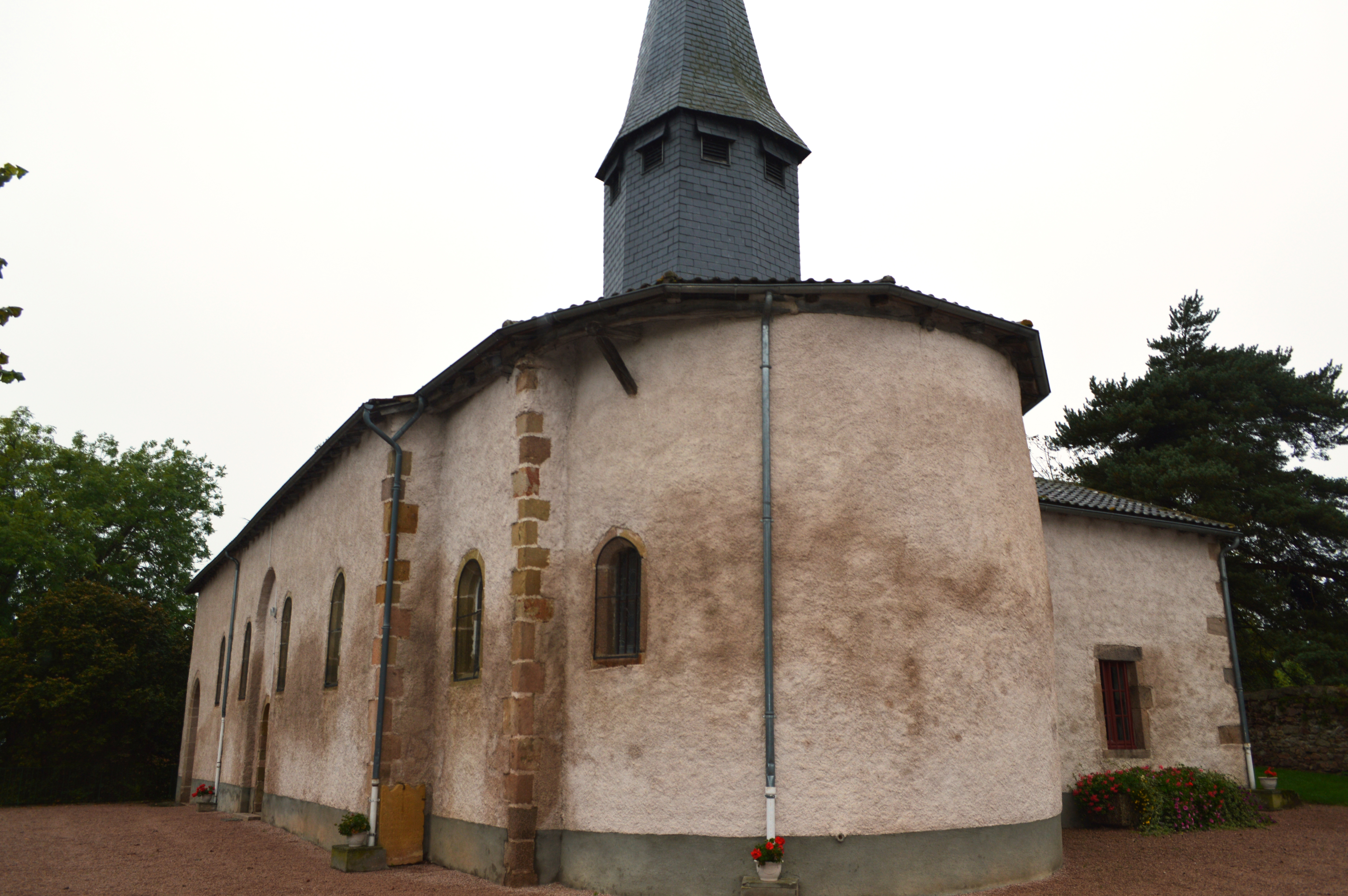
Andelaroche Church

- There is a church of Romanesque origin but much altered in the 19th century. It is now a composite structure that has lost its original appearance.

=== Andelaroche Picture Gallery ===
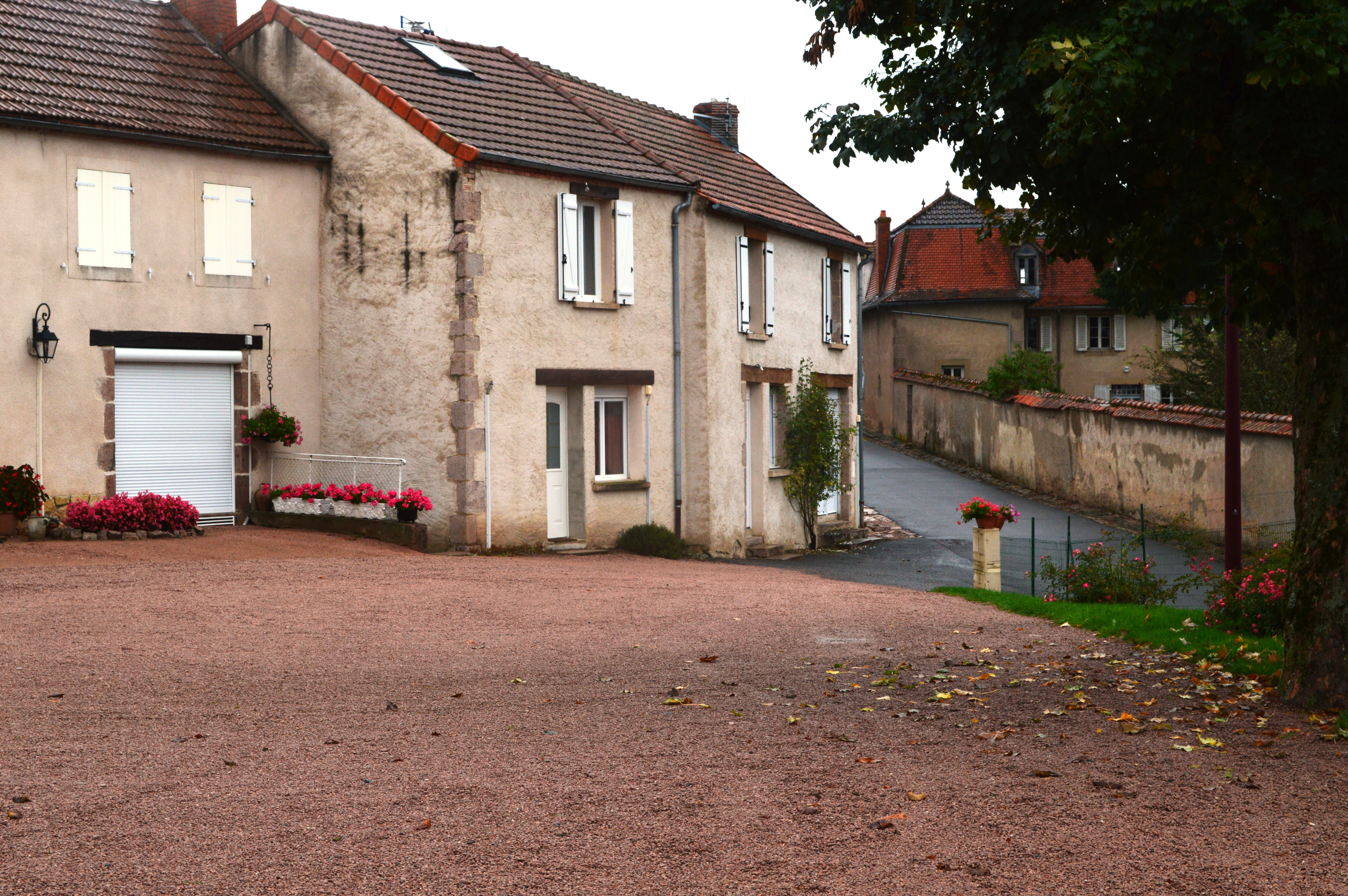
A street in Andelaroche

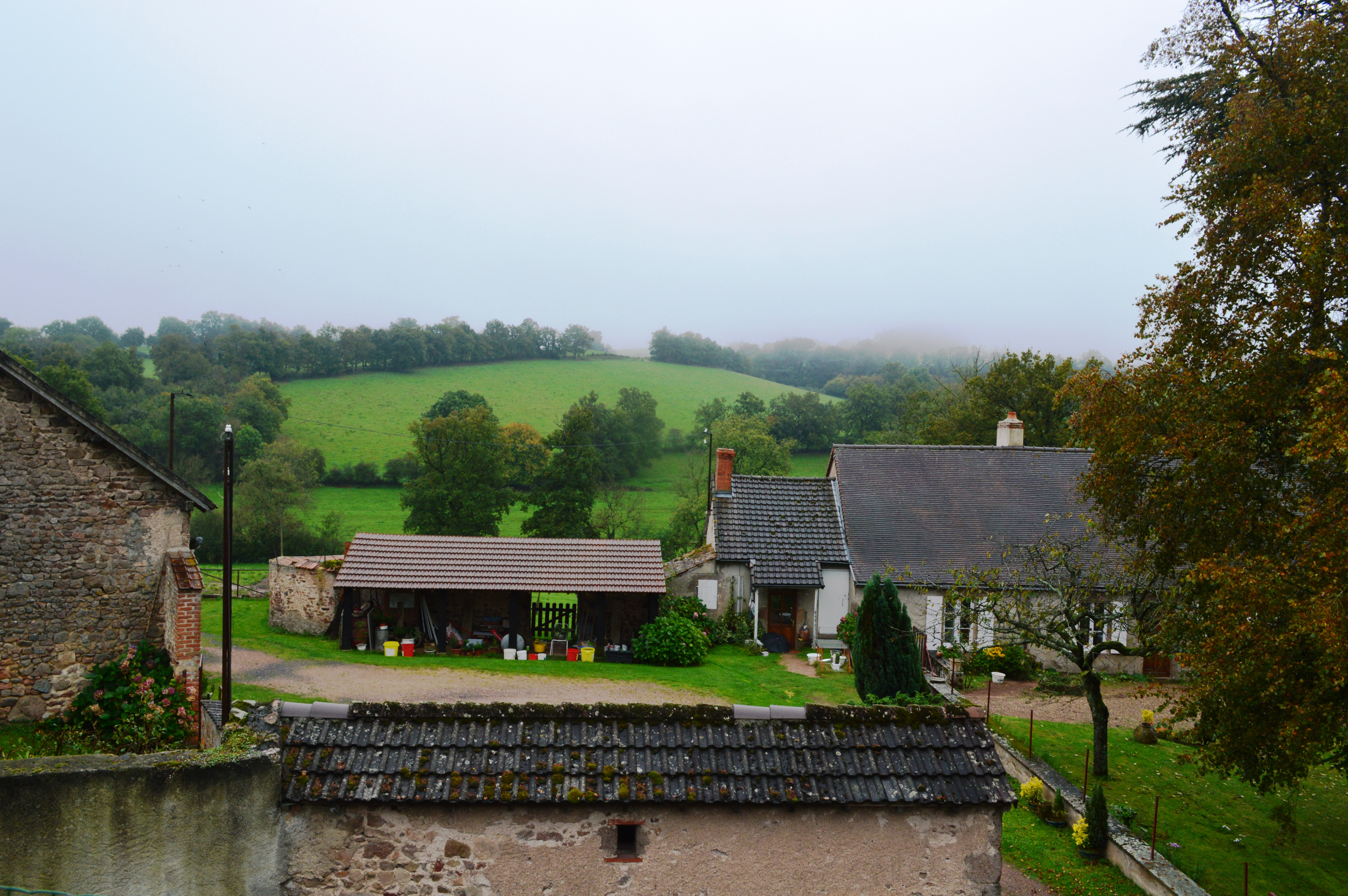
Andelaroche Landscape

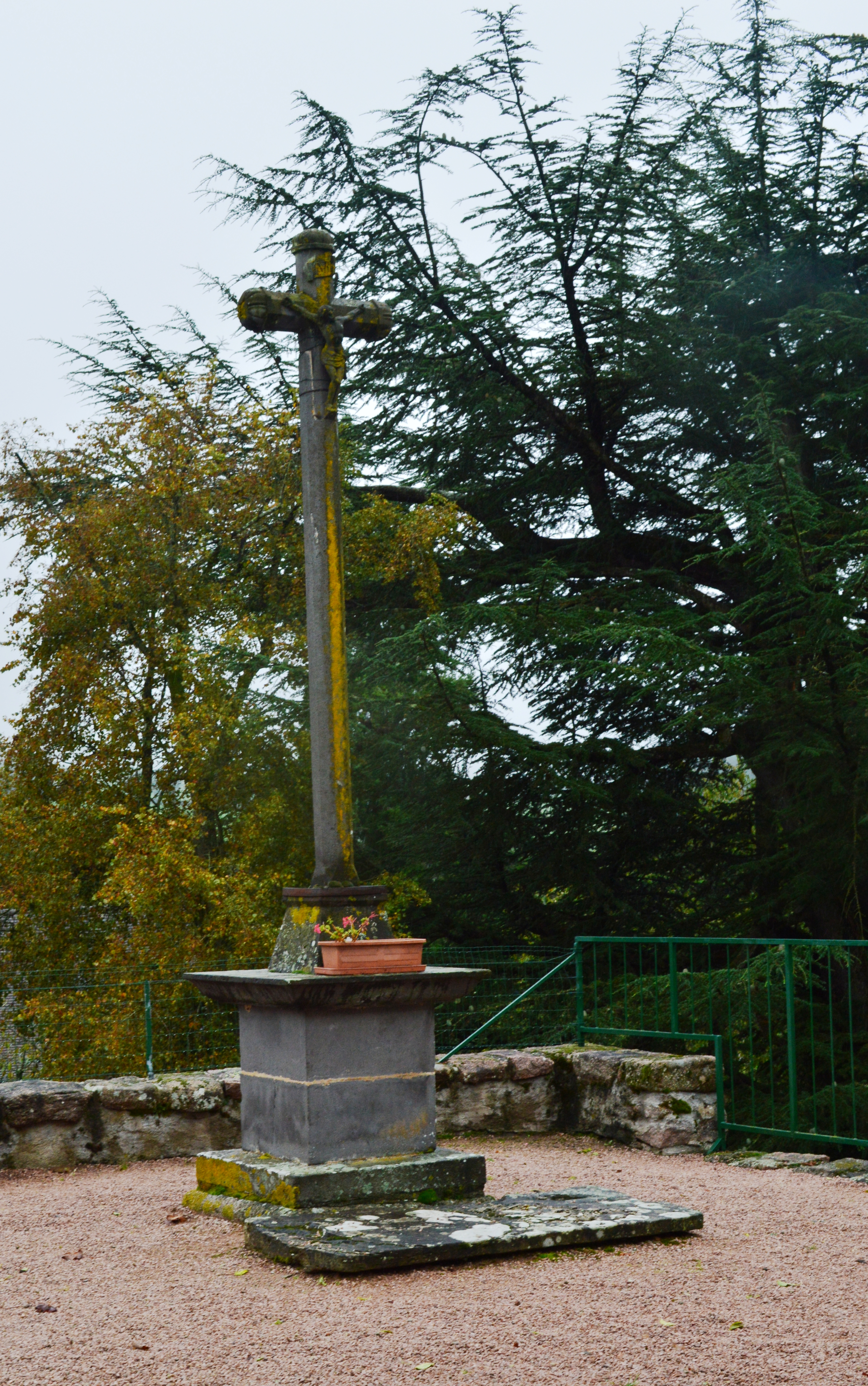
A Wayside Cross in Andelaroche

== See also ==
- Communes of the Allier department
