= Tigre de Sibérie =

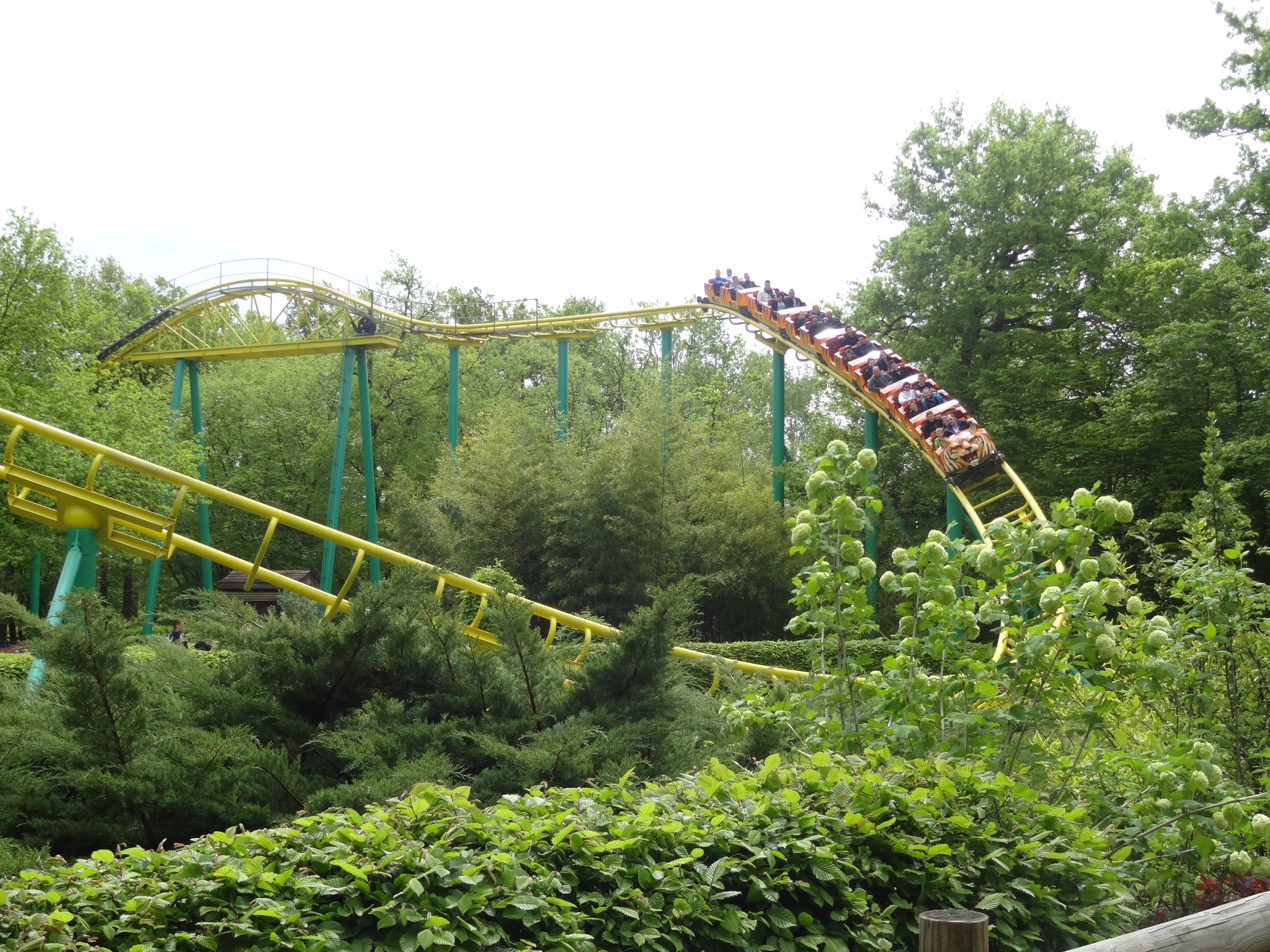

Le Pal
- Location: Le Pal
- Coordinates: 46.5085°N 3.6308°E
- Status: Operating
- Opening date: 1990

General statistics
- Type: Steel
- Manufacturer: Reverchon Industries
- Model: Figure eight
- Height: 42.7 ft (13.0 m)
- Length: 1,181.1 ft (360.0 m)
- Speed: 24.9 mph (40.1 km/h)

Tigre de Sibérie is a steel roller coaster at Le Pal that opened in 1990. It was Reverchon's first installed coaster.
