= Barrais-Bussolles =

- Commune
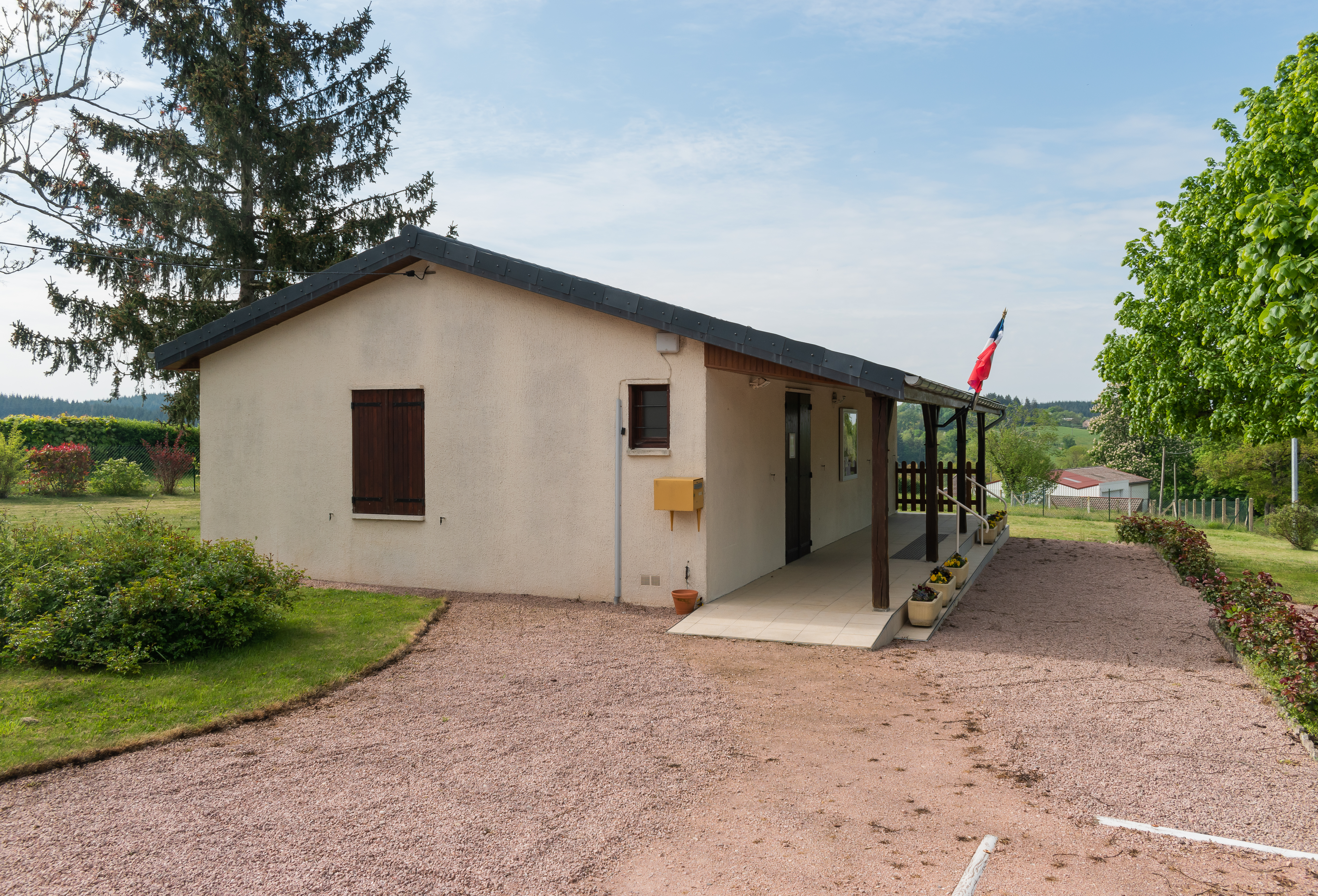
- Town hall

- Coat of arms
- Location of Barrais-Bussolles
- Location within France Location within Auvergne-Rhône-Alpes
- Coordinates: 46°17′31″N 3°42′59″E
- Country: France
- Region: Auvergne-Rhône-Alpes
- Department: Allier
- Arrondissement: Vichy
- Canton: Lapalisse
- Intercommunality: Pays de Lapalisse

Government
  - Mayor (2026–32): Delphine Thevenoux
- Area^{1}: 25.34 km^{2} (9.78 sq mi)
- Elevation: 470 m (1,540 ft)
- Highest elevation: 505 m (1,657 ft)
- Lowest elevation: 287 m (942 ft)
- Population (2023): 185
  - Density: 7.30/km^{2} (18.9/sq mi)
- Demonym: Barraisiens
- Time zone: UTC+01:00 (CET)
  - Summer (DST): UTC+02:00 (CEST)
- INSEE/Postal code: 03017 /03120
- ^{1} French Land Register data, which excludes lakes, ponds, glaciers > 1 km^{2} (0.386 sq mi or 247 acres) and river estuaries.

Barrais-Bussolles (French pronunciation: [baʁɛ bysɔl]) is a commune in the Allier department in the Auvergne-Rhône-Alpes region of central France.

The inhabitants of the commune are known as Barraisiens or Barraisiennes.

== Geography ==
Barrais-Bussolles is located some 42.3 km (26.3 mi) south-east of Moulins and 28.8 km (17.9 mi) north-east of Vichy. Access to the commune is by the D424 road from Andelaroche in the south-east which passes through the village and continues north to join the D124 inside the commune. The D124 comes from Bert in the north and passes through the northern part of the commune continuing south-west to Lapalisse. Apart from the village there are also the hamlets of La Tuilerie, Les Rois d'en Bas, Les Rois, Les Cinq Chênes, Les Goyards, Les Gailles, Les Desserts, La Bruyère, Le Casson, Montpertuis, Les Tixiers, Les Rigondets, Les Jayots de Bois, Les Allaisons, Mâme, and Les Rivières in the commune. The commune is mainly farmland with some forest in the south-east and north-east.

The Ris des Rois stream forms the north-western border of the commune as it flows north-west to join La Besbre near Trézelles. The Ruisseau de Conrieux forms most of the northern border of the commune as it flows east to join the Ris des Rois. The Ruisseau de l'Étang Cochon also rises in the north of the commune and flows north-east to join the Ris des Rois. On the western border the Ruisseau de Gerban forms the border as it flows south-west to join La Petit Tèche which continues to join La Besbre north of Lapalisse. The Ruisseau de Maupas forms the southern border of the commune as it flows east to join La Petit Tèche. The Ruisseau de Saint-Pourçain forms part of the eastern border as it flows north to join the Ruisseau des Gouttes Barres which in turn forms the north-eastern border as it flows north to join La Tèche near Bert.

== History ==
Barrais appears as Barrois on the 1750 Cassini Map and the same on the 1790 version.

Bussolles appears as Bufsolles on the 1750 Cassini Map and as Bussoles on the 1790 version.

The commune was formed in 1833 by the merger of the communes of Barrais and Bussolles.

=== Heraldry ===
Arms of Barrais-Bussolles	Blazon: Bendy sinister of 6 Sable and Or, the third and fifth bar charged with a cross moline the same in pale.

== Administration ==
List of Successive Mayors

From	To	Name
2001	2014	Aimé Delorme
2014	2020	Pierre Raboutot
2020	Current	Delphine Thevenoux

The Municipal Council is composed of 11 members including the Mayor and 2 deputies.

== Demography ==
Historical population

Year	Pop.	±% p.a.
1793	471	—
1821	434	−0.29%
1836	705	+3.29%
1846	812	+1.42%
1861	729	−0.72%
1872	711	−0.23%
1881	787	+1.13%
1891	795	+0.10%
1901	733	−0.81%
1911	691	−0.59%
1921	603	−1.35%
1931	565	−0.65%
1936	518	−1.72%

Year	Pop.	±% p.a.
1946	448	−1.44%
1954	401	−1.38%
1962	374	−0.87%
1968	370	−0.18%
1975	282	−3.81%
1982	241	−2.22%
1990	215	−1.42%
1999	222	+0.36%
2007	216	−0.34%
2012	211	−0.47%
2017	192	−1.87%
2023	185	−0.62%

Source: EHESS and INSEE

== Culture and heritage ==
=== Religious heritage ===
The Chapel de la Tour Pourçain (13th century) is registered as an historical monument. It is in the Gothic style with a bell tower over a facade that was added in the 19th century with a slate roof and surmounted by a wooden arrow.

== Notable people linked to the commune ==
André Louis Laveissière (called Kiki), born 8 August 1913 in Hautot-sur-Mer (Seine-Maritime) and died 24 November 1994 in Paris. He joined General de Gaulle in England, walking across France and later Spain. Member of the Free French Air Force, former No. 341 Squadron RAF. Chevalier of the Legion of Honour, Croix de Guerre with palm 1939–1945, Resistance Medal, Escapees' Medal, Volunteer combatant's cross, and Aeronautical Medal. He lived in the commune during part of his youth. He then lived in Boulogne-Billancourt. He is, however, buried in the cemetery of Barrais-Bussolles.

== See also ==
- Communes of the Allier department
