= Château de La Palice =

Castle in Auvergne-Rhône-Alpes, France

Coordinates: 46°14′55″N 3°38′18″E

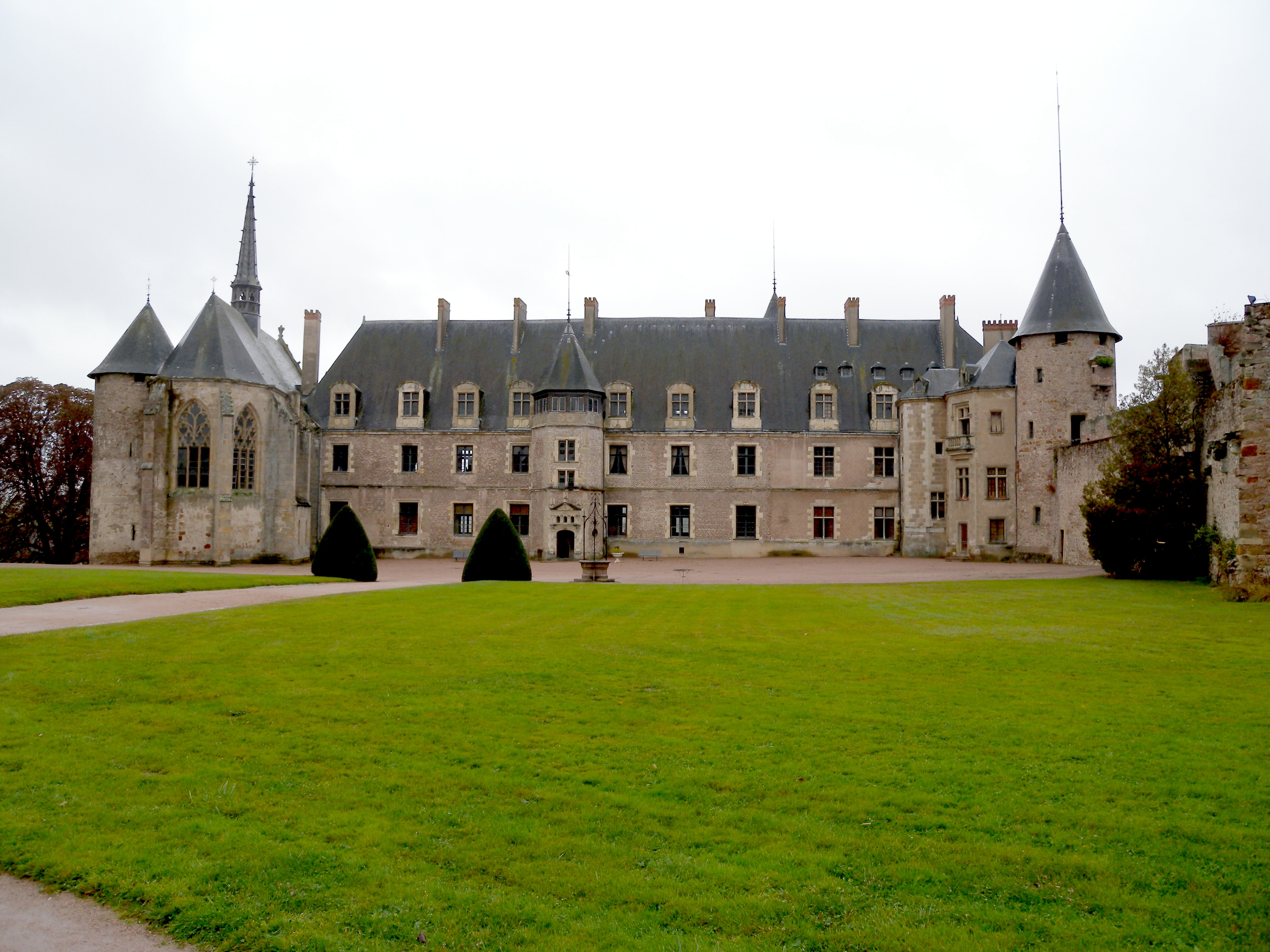
Château de La Palice

The Château de La Palice is a castle, developed into a château, in the commune of Lapalisse in the Allier department of the Auvergne-Rhône-Alpes region of France.

== History ==
Built between the 11th and 13th centuries, the feudal part of the castle was acquired by Jacques de Chabannes in 1430 or 1431. His grandson, Jacques II, maréchal of France, built the Renaissance wing at the beginning of the 16th century out of rose-coloured bricks, endowing the castle with sobriety and elegance. This wing replaced the wall connecting the fortress to the Gothic-style chapel, itself built c. 1470.

The ceilings have raised colourful box beams inlaid with gold.

Today, the fully furnished living rooms contain many historical artefacts as a museum of the castle's history.

The Château de La Palice is listed as a monument historique by the French Ministry of Culture.

== See also ==
- List of castles in France
