= Saint-Pourçain-sur-Besbre =

- Commune
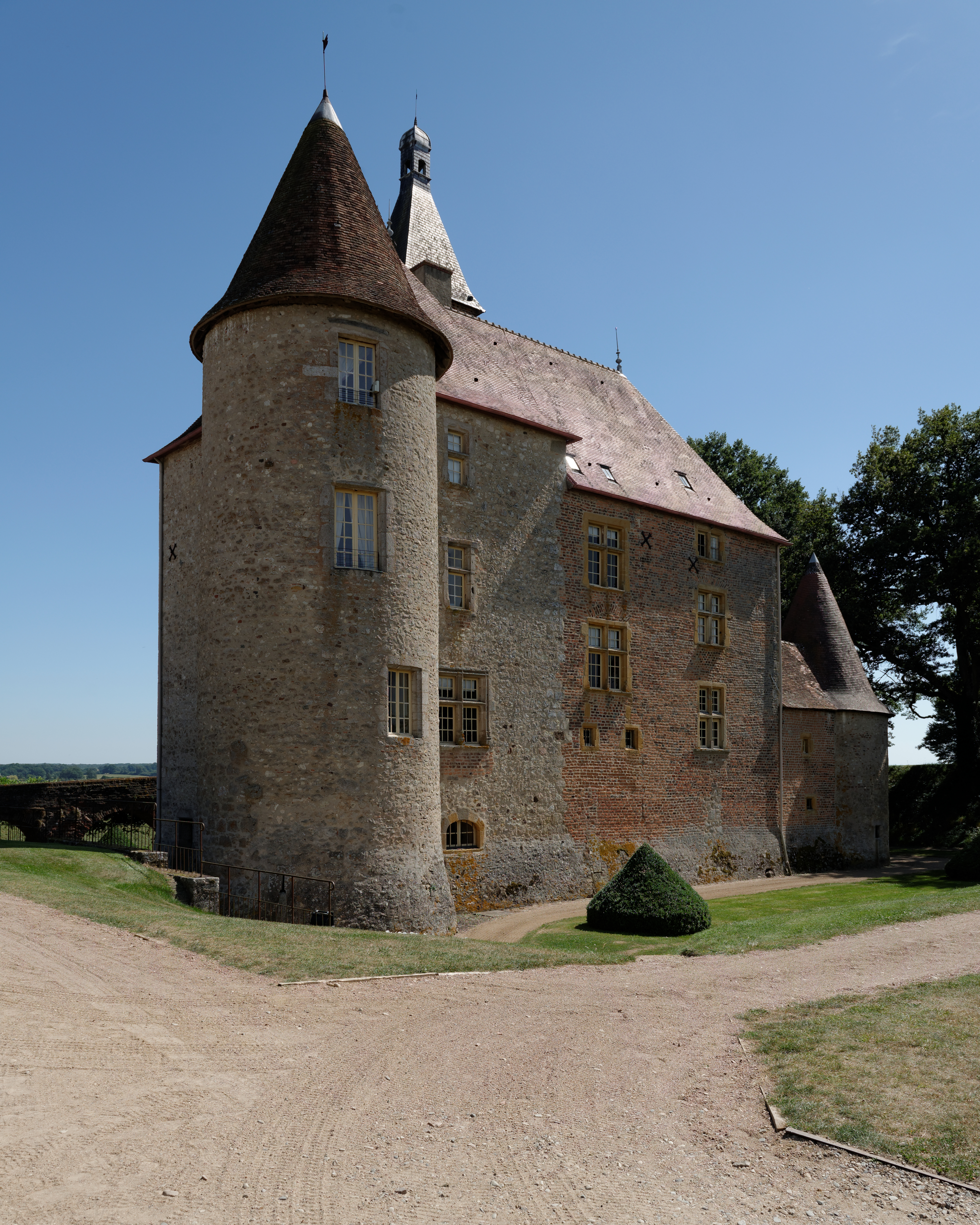
- The Chateau de Beauvoir, in Saint-Pourcain-sur-Besbre
- Location of Saint-Pourçain-sur-Besbre
- Location within France Location within Auvergne-Rhône-Alpes
- Coordinates: 46°28′34″N 3°38′14″E
- Country: France
- Region: Auvergne-Rhône-Alpes
- Department: Allier
- Arrondissement: Vichy
- Canton: Dompierre-sur-Besbre
- Intercommunality: Entr'Allier Besbre et Loire

Government
  - Mayor (2026–32): Fabrice Maridet
- Area^{1}: 32.99 km^{2} (12.74 sq mi)
- Elevation: 232 m (761 ft)
- Highest elevation: 286 m (938 ft)
- Lowest elevation: 219 m (719 ft)
- Population (2023): 371
  - Density: 11.2/km^{2} (29.1/sq mi)
- Time zone: UTC+01:00 (CET)
  - Summer (DST): UTC+02:00 (CEST)
- INSEE/Postal code: 03253 /03290
- ^{1} French Land Register data, which excludes lakes, ponds, glaciers > 1 km^{2} (0.386 sq mi or 247 acres) and river estuaries.

Saint-Pourçain-sur-Besbre (French pronunciation: [sɛ̃ puʁsɛ̃ syʁ bɛbʁ], literally Saint-Pourçain on Besbre) is a commune in the Allier department in Auvergne-Rhône-Alpes in central France.

Le Pal is an animal theme park in the municipality area of Saint-Pourçain-sur-Besbre.

== Population ==
Historical population
Year	Pop.	±% p.a.
1968	467	—
1975	477	+0.30%
1982	448	−0.89%
1990	423	−0.72%
1999	426	+0.08%
2007	419	−0.21%
2012	422	+0.14%
2017	418	−0.19%
2023	371	−1.97%
Source: INSEE

== See also ==
- Communes of the Allier department
