= Varennes-sur-Tèche =

- Commune
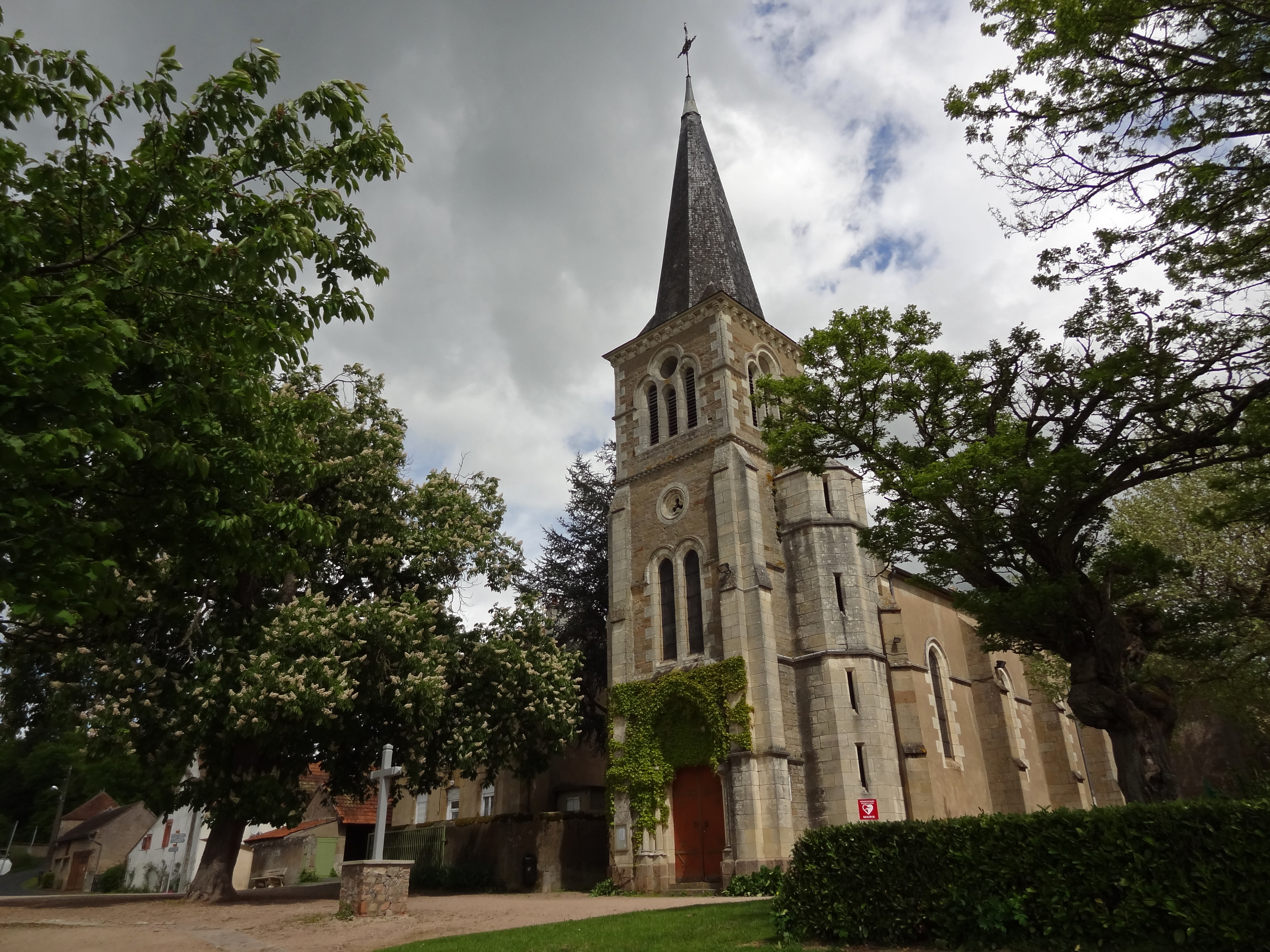
- The church in Varennes-sur-Tèche

- Coat of arms
- Location of Varennes-sur-Tèche
- Location within France Location within Auvergne-Rhône-Alpes
- Coordinates: 46°19′36″N 3°37′47″E
- Country: France
- Region: Auvergne-Rhône-Alpes
- Department: Allier
- Arrondissement: Vichy
- Canton: Moulins-2
- Intercommunality: Entr'Allier Besbre et Loire

Government
  - Mayor (2026–32): Gilles Berrat
- Area^{1}: 18.73 km^{2} (7.23 sq mi)
- Elevation: 282 m (925 ft)
- Highest elevation: 380 m (1,250 ft)
- Lowest elevation: 258 m (846 ft)
- Population (2023): 228
  - Density: 12.2/km^{2} (31.5/sq mi)
- Time zone: UTC+01:00 (CET)
  - Summer (DST): UTC+02:00 (CEST)
- INSEE/Postal code: 03299 /03220
- ^{1} French Land Register data, which excludes lakes, ponds, glaciers > 1 km^{2} (0.386 sq mi or 247 acres) and river estuaries.

Varennes-sur-Tèche (French pronunciation: [vaʁɛn syʁ tɛʃ]) is a commune in the Allier department in Auvergne-Rhône-Alpes in central France.

== Population ==
Historical population
Year	Pop.	±% p.a.
1968	375	—
1975	345	−1.18%
1982	291	−2.40%
1990	236	−2.58%
1999	254	+0.82%
2007	255	+0.05%
2012	257	+0.16%
2017	245	−0.95%
2023	228	−1.19%
Source: INSEE

== See also ==
- Communes of the Allier department
