= Tizac-de-Curton =

- Commune
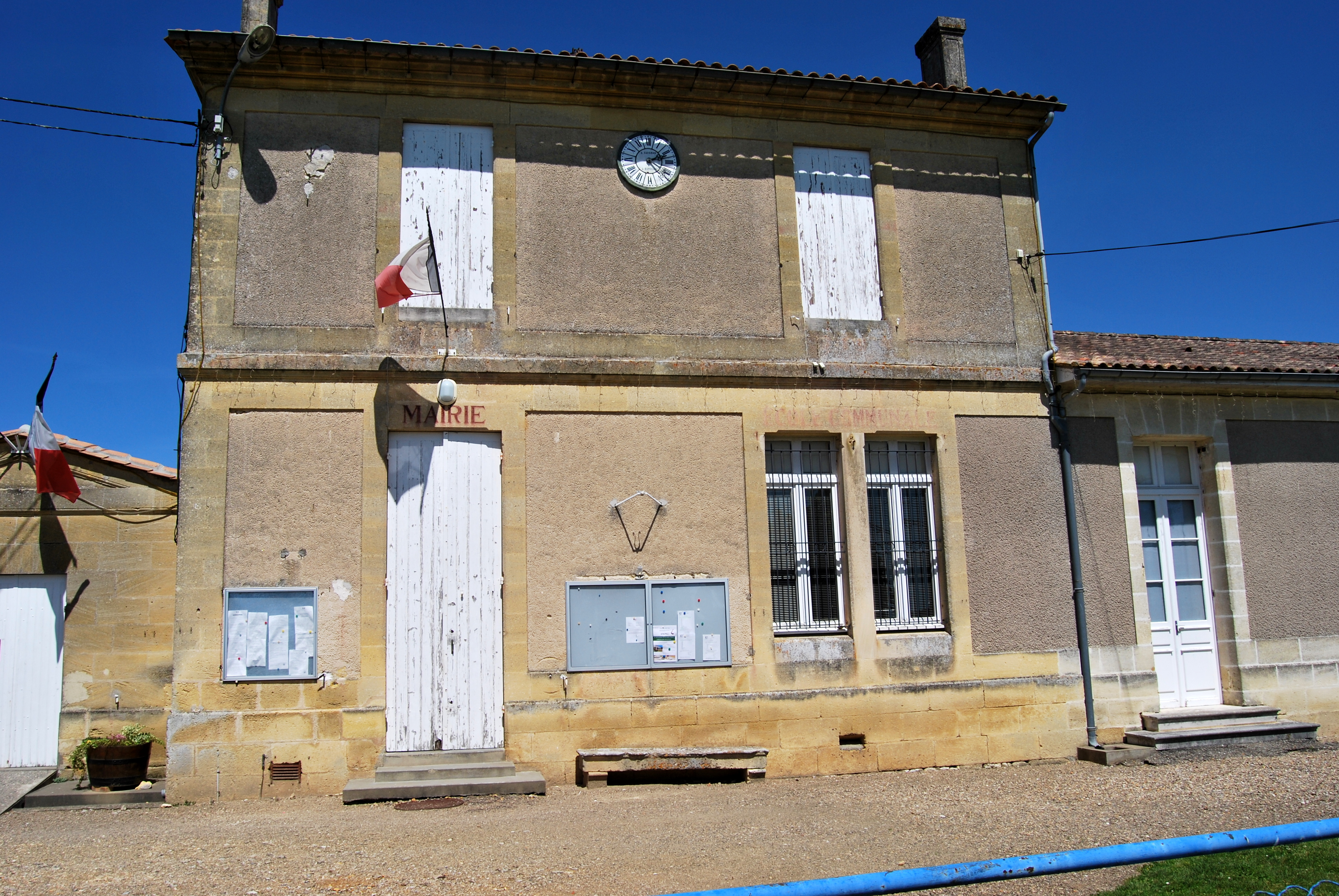
- The town hall in Tizac-de-Curton

- Coat of arms
- Location of Tizac-de-Curton
- Location within France Location within Nouvelle-Aquitaine
- Coordinates: 44°49′19″N 0°14′58″W
- Country: France
- Region: Nouvelle-Aquitaine
- Department: Gironde
- Arrondissement: Libourne
- Canton: Les Coteaux de Dordogne
- Intercommunality: CA Libournais

Government
  - Mayor (2020–2026): Josette Travaillot
- Area^{1}: 3.97 km^{2} (1.53 sq mi)
- Elevation: 58 m (190 ft)
- Highest elevation: 77 m (253 ft)
- Lowest elevation: 9 m (30 ft)
- Population (2023): 383
  - Density: 96.5/km^{2} (250/sq mi)
- Time zone: UTC+01:00 (CET)
  - Summer (DST): UTC+02:00 (CEST)
- INSEE/Postal code: 33531 /33420
- ^{1} French Land Register data, which excludes lakes, ponds, glaciers > 1 km^{2} (0.386 sq mi or 247 acres) and river estuaries.

Tizac-de-Curton (French pronunciation: [tizak də kyʁtɔ̃]; Occitan: Tisac de Curton) is a commune in the Gironde department in Nouvelle-Aquitaine in southwestern France.

== Population ==
Historical population
Year	Pop.	±% p.a.
1968	201	—
1975	219	+1.23%
1982	261	+2.54%
1990	309	+2.13%
1999	297	−0.44%
2007	279	−0.78%
2012	296	+1.19%
2017	330	+2.20%
2023	383	+2.51%
Source: INSEE

== See also ==
- Communes of the Gironde department
