= Jacques de Chabannes =

French nobleman and military officer

Jacques de Chabannes (ca. 1400-1453) was a French nobleman and military commander during the reign of King Charles VII. The elder brother of Antoine de Chabannes, he is most notable for his significant role at the Battle of Castillon in 1453.

== Life ==
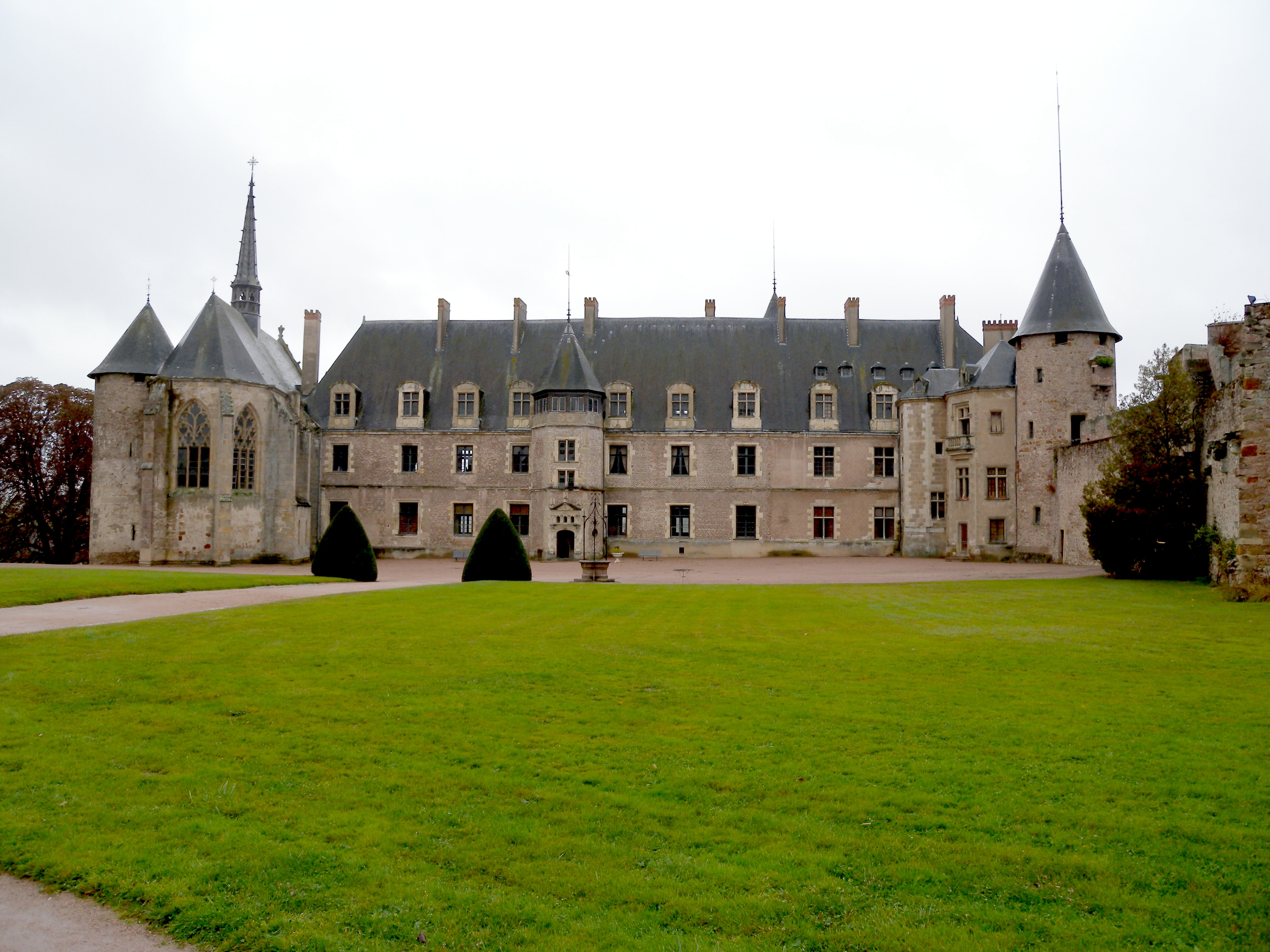
Château de La Palice

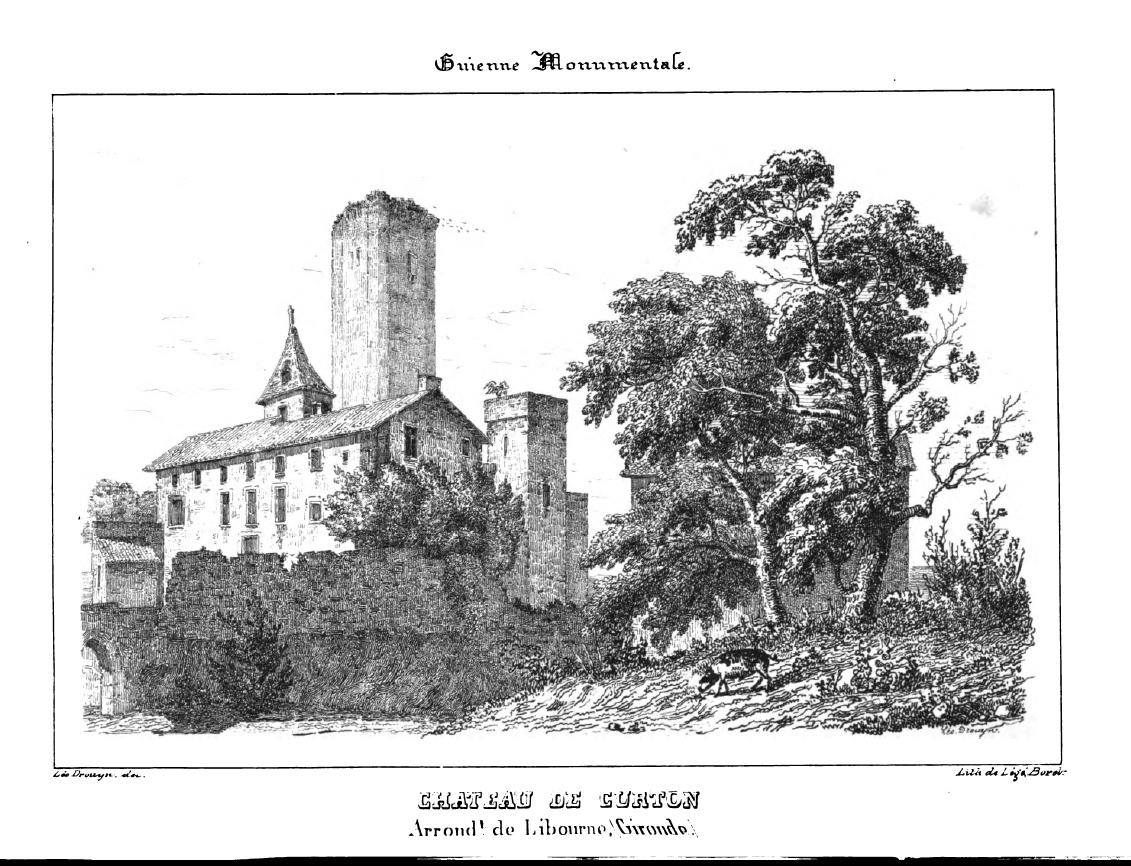
Château de Curton

Jacques was the second son of Robert de Chabannes and Alix de Bort, and became the Chabannes family's senior member following the death of his brother Etienne at the Battle of Cravant in July 1423. He successfully served John I, Duke of Bourbon and became his seneschal in 1428. He took part in the Siege of Orléans where Joan of Arc triumphed in 1429, and in the Siege of Compiègne where she was captured in 1430. In 1431 he bought the domain of La Palice from the Duke of Bourbon for 6,000 gold écus. In 1436 Charles VII made him Captain of Vincennes.

In 1440 he participated in the feudal revolt against Charles VII known as the Praguerie and subsequently lost his post as Seneschal of Toulouse, which he had been given in 1438, but was back in royal favor by the mid-1440s. In 1451 the king awarded him the lordship of Curton and its dependencies, southwest of Bordeaux, which he had confiscated from Louis II de Beaumont-Bressuire.

During the 1451 campaign he also took part in retaking Blaye, Bourg, Fronsac and Bayonne from the English. On 17 July 1453 he was instrumental in the decisive French victory at the Battle of Castillon, which effectively marked the end of the Hundred Years' War. He fell ill during that campaign, however, and died at Curton on 25 October 1453. His younger brother Antoine de Chabannes, who in the meantime had become one of France's prominent military leaders, inherited the command of his company of soldiers.

On 30 May 1429 he married Anne de Launay, who died childless the next year. On 4 October 1432 he married Anne de Lavieu de Feugerolles. They had two sons, from which stem the two subsequent branches of the Chabannes family, respectively named after the two castles acquired by Jacques: the lords of Chabannes de La Palice from Geoffroy (ca. 1433-1500), and lords of Curton from Gilbert (ca. 1439-1495).

He was buried according to his will at the Franciscans' convent in nearby Rions.
