= Le Pal =

Animal theme park in France

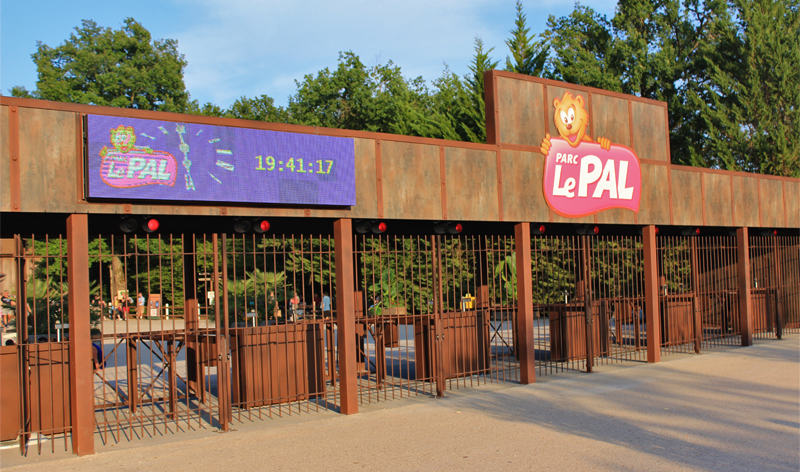
- The entrance
- Interactive map of Le Pal
- Location: Saint-Pourçain-sur-Besbre, Allier, France
- Coordinates: 46°30′26″N 03°37′50″E
- Status: Operating
- Opened: 1973
- General manager: Arnaud Bennet
- Attendance: 640,000
- Area: 50 ha (120 acres)

Attractions
- Total: 31
- Roller coasters: 5
- Water rides: 5
- Shows: 3
- Website: Official website

Le Pal is a French animal theme park that combines two activities: an amusement park and a zoo in the municipality area of Saint-Pourçain-sur-Besbre, in the Allier, France. Created in 1973, the site became a theme park in 1981. As of 2025, it offers 31 attractions and more than 1000 animals in semi-captivity, among several animal shows.

== History ==
Le Pal zoo was created in 1973 by André Charbonnier (1929-1981) with the help of the Vincennes Zoo's veterinary surgeon. In the first years the park already had a train and a small playground. It's in 1981 that the park became a true amusement park. 280000 people visited Le Pal in 1998.

== Attractions ==
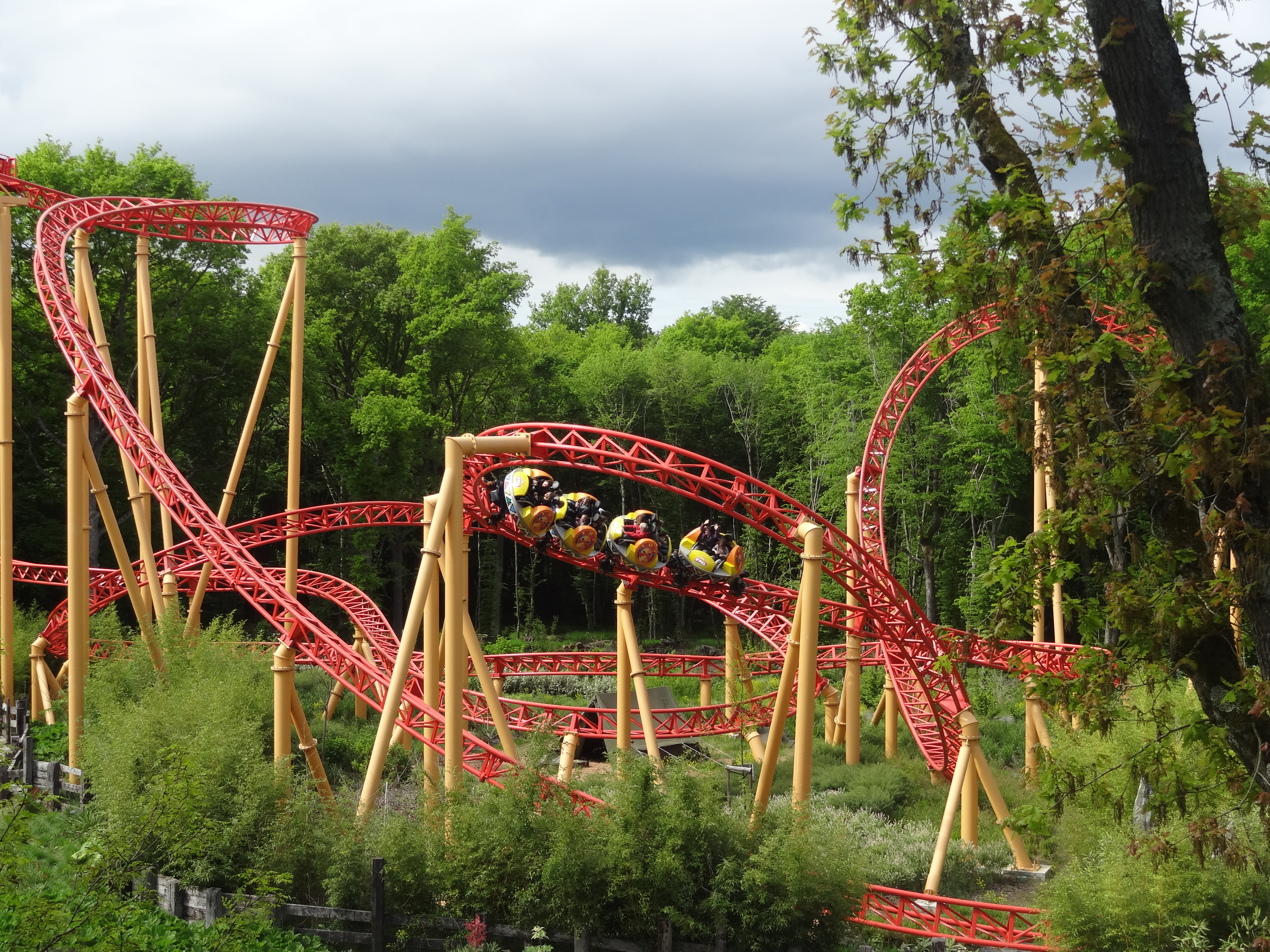
Twist

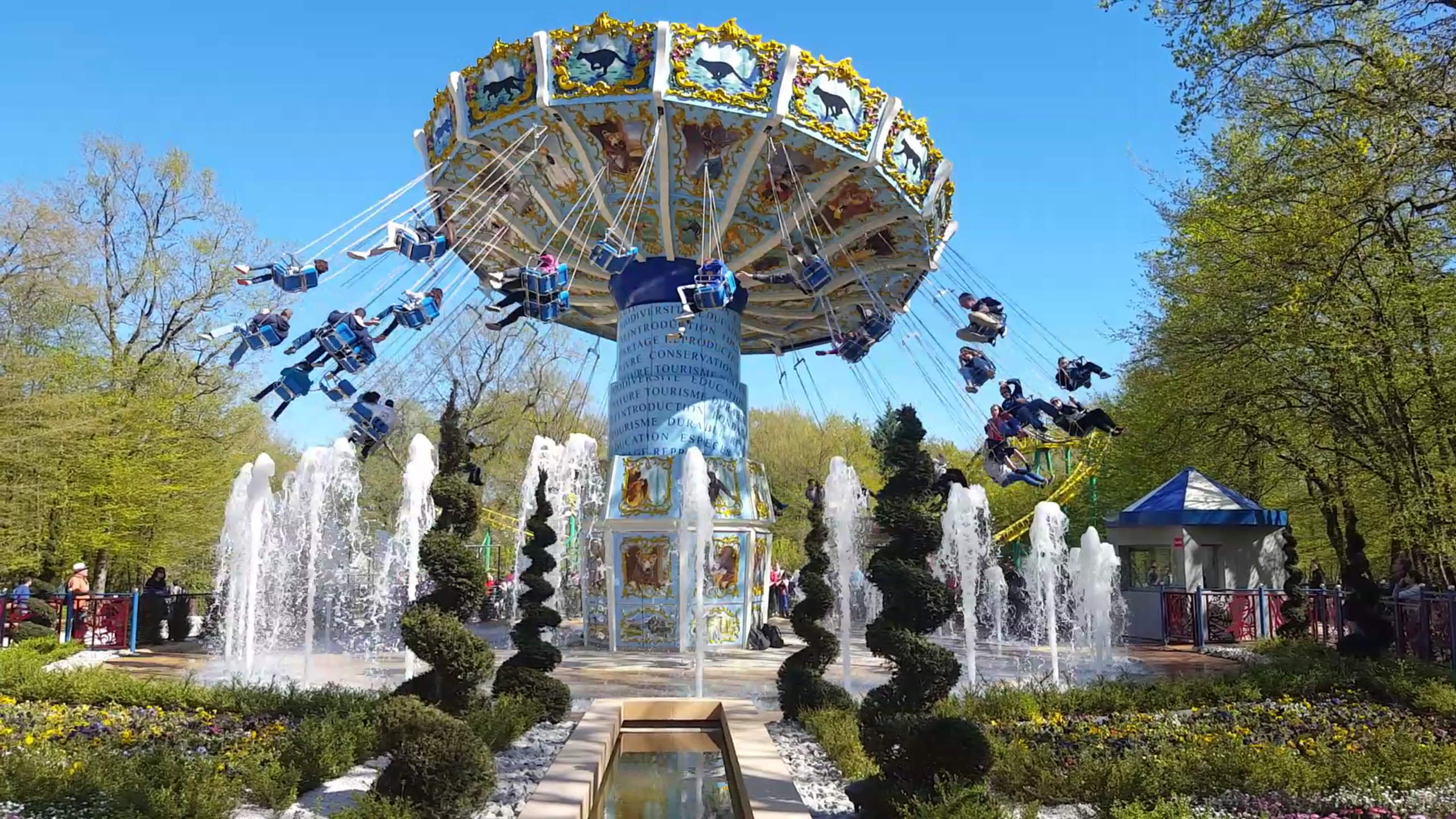
Chaises volantes

There are many attractions and shows including :

- Yukon Quad, a launched roller coaster, built by Intamin (2018).
- Twist, a spinning roller coaster, built by Mack Rides (2011).
- Tigre de Sibérie, a steel roller coaster, built by Reverchon Industries (1990).
- Azteka, a steel roller coaster, built by Soquet (2003).
- Alligator Baie, a Splash Battle (2014).
- Lac des chercheurs d'or, a tow boat ride.
- Rapido, water slides (2005).
- Bateau pirate, a pirate ship (1995).
- Rivière canadienne, a log flume (1992).
- Disque du soleil, Disk'O coaster (2007).
- Descente du Colorado, a river rafting ride (1988).
- Chaises volantes, wave swinger (2016)
- Champi'Folies, a dark ride (2023)

== Lodging ==
With an investment of 4.5 million euros Le Pal launches "Les Lodges du Pal" a unique safari-like style hotel in Europe, on April 13, 2013. Extended over 9 to 12 acres, it includes a hundred of bed in 24 lodges with a 40 m^{2} surface area. These lodges were built on piles and are embellished with the African savannah colors, and can also host 5 people. These accommodations give a beautiful view on several animal species such as zebras or springboks along with a new exotic area. The park suggests the Tanganika restaurant and a patio facing a pond. Surrounded by the forest and next to the zoo's area, the hotel is only available during the operating season of the theme park.

== Economic data ==
Each year, the park invests 10 to 13% of its income in innovations. In other words, almost 3.5 million euros are reinvested yearly for a turnover around 12 million euros. With an 80% loyalty rate, Le Pal is the fifth most visited amusement park in France and the fourth in the zoo sector. It is the first tourist attraction in the region of Auvergne. Protection programs

== Le Pal Nature Foundation ==
Created in April 2008, Le Pal Nature Foundation is dedicated to the biodiversity preservation all around the world. It initiates, helps, financially assists, technically and human projects in France and abroad which suggest perennial solutions towards threats facing biodiversity, especially endangered species as well as their habitat. Projects are chosen according to their seriousness, their actions in the long run and their involvement of local populations. The financial fulfillment of the foundation is a budget of €45,000 per year within a multi-year actions program over 5 years.

== Obtaining the Green Globe certification ==
In October 2010, Le Pal was the first French theme park which obtained a Green Globe, an international certification for sustainable tourism.
