= Gaston Petit =

French sculptor

- Born: 6 October 1890; Saint-Jean-de-Vignes, France
- Died: September 1984
- Occupation: Sculptor

Gaston Petit (French pronunciation: [ɡastɔ̃ pəti]; 6 October 1890 – September 1984) was a French sculptor. His work was part of the sculpture event in the art competition at the 1928 Summer Olympics.

== Biography ==
Gaston Petit lives in Paris. He is a student of Jean Antoine Injalbert. A member of the Société des artistes français, he has exhibited his work in art salons since 1913. One of his works in a public space is a bronze bust by the sculptor Jean-Marie Mengue in Bagnères-de-Luchon.

He created several monuments to the victims of World War I, notably in Pondicherry, India, which was then a French colony. In Amsterdam, he unveiled busts of the aviation pioneers Charles Nungesser and Coli. A life-size plaster bust of Nungesser is on display at the museum in Étretat on the Normandy coast. Petit contributed to the monument to Nungesser and Coli, erected in Étretat by Louis Rey (architect), which was submitted to an architectural competition.
