= Daignac =

- Commune
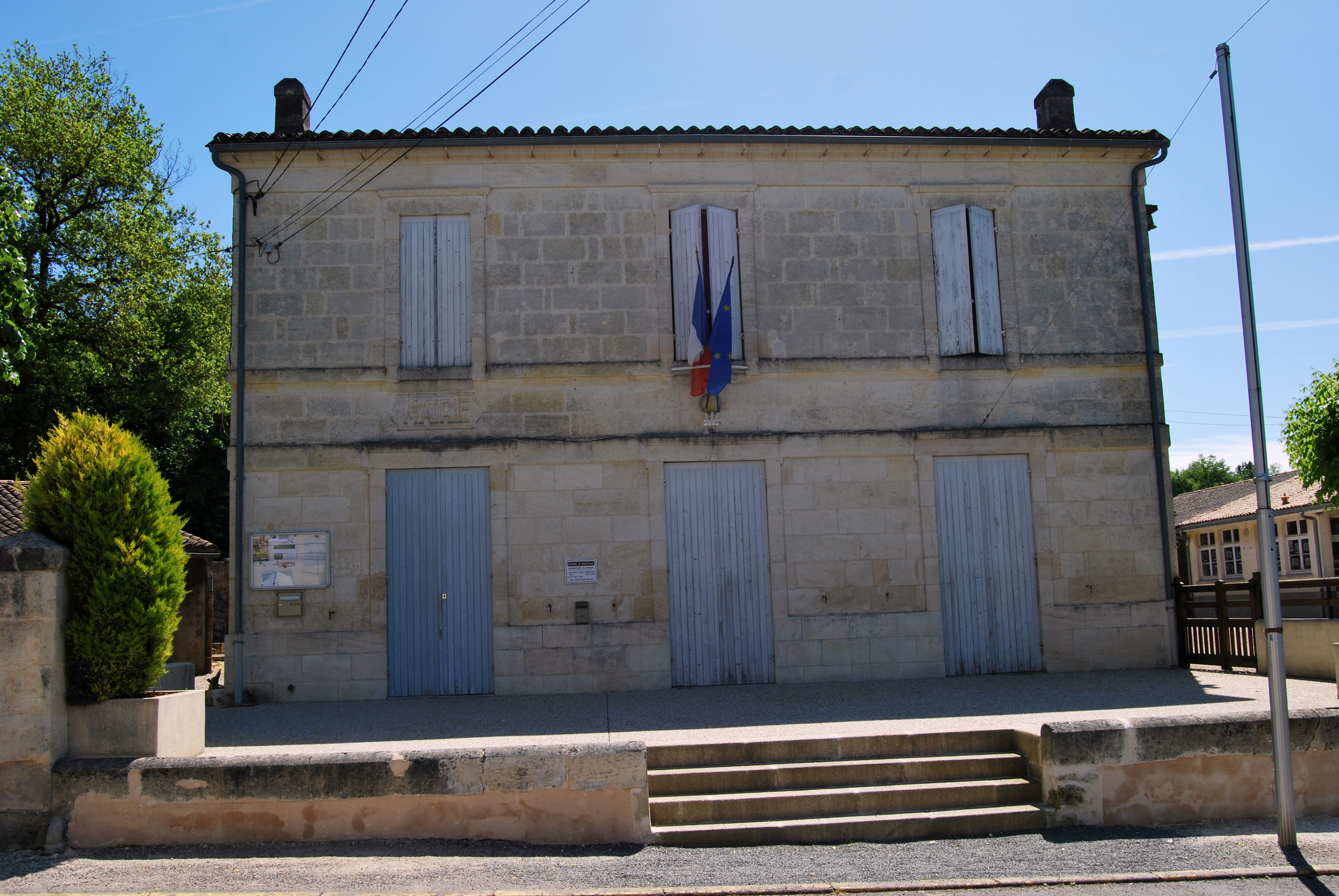
- The town hall in Daignac
- Location of Daignac
- Location within France Location within Nouvelle-Aquitaine
- Coordinates: 44°48′01″N 0°14′54″W
- Country: France
- Region: Nouvelle-Aquitaine
- Department: Gironde
- Arrondissement: Libourne
- Canton: Les Coteaux de Dordogne
- Intercommunality: CA Libournais

Government
  - Mayor (2020–2026): Michel Massias
- Area^{1}: 5.73 km^{2} (2.21 sq mi)
- Elevation: 77 m (253 ft)
- Highest elevation: 86 m (282 ft)
- Lowest elevation: 16 m (52 ft)
- Population (2023): 473
  - Density: 82.5/km^{2} (214/sq mi)
- Time zone: UTC+01:00 (CET)
  - Summer (DST): UTC+02:00 (CEST)
- INSEE/Postal code: 33147 /33420
- ^{1} French Land Register data, which excludes lakes, ponds, glaciers > 1 km^{2} (0.386 sq mi or 247 acres) and river estuaries.

Daignac is a commune in the Gironde department in southwestern France.

== Population ==
Historical population
Year	Pop.	±% p.a.
1968	411	—
1975	364	−1.72%
1982	364	+0.00%
1990	361	−0.10%
1999	406	+1.31%
2007	473	+1.93%
2012	471	−0.08%
2017	476	+0.21%
2023	473	−0.11%
Source: INSEE

== See also ==
- Communes of the Gironde department
