= Jaligny-sur-Besbre =

- Commune
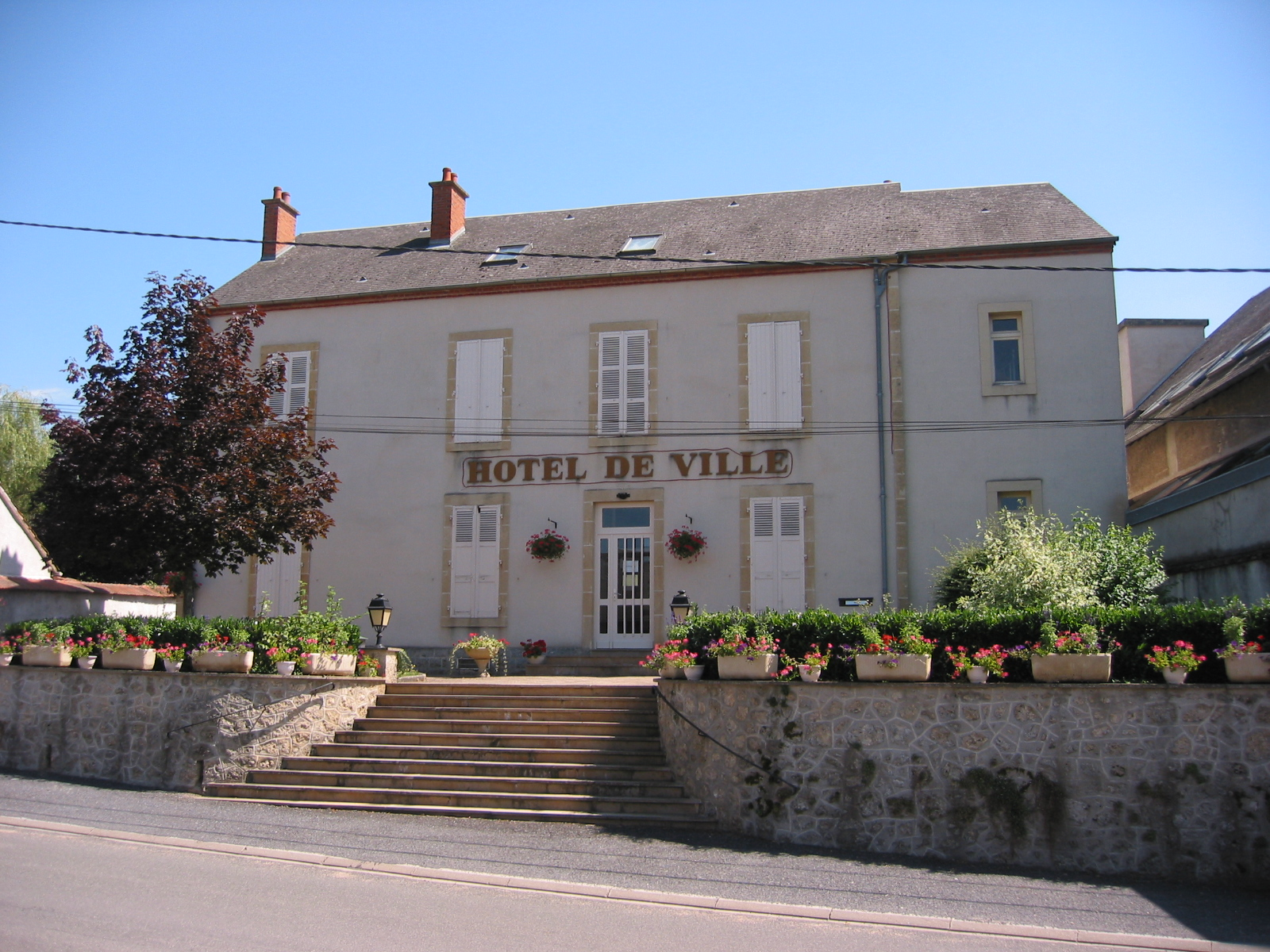
- Town hall

- Coat of arms
- Location of Jaligny-sur-Besbre
- Location within France Location within Auvergne-Rhône-Alpes
- Coordinates: 46°22′51″N 3°35′34″E
- Country: France
- Region: Auvergne-Rhône-Alpes
- Department: Allier
- Arrondissement: Vichy
- Canton: Moulins-2
- Intercommunality: Entr'Allier Besbre et Loire

Government
  - Mayor (2026–32): Yann Gibert
- Area^{1}: 9.63 km^{2} (3.72 sq mi)
- Elevation: 245 m (804 ft)
- Highest elevation: 307 m (1,007 ft)
- Lowest elevation: 239 m (784 ft)
- Population (2023): 559
  - Density: 58.0/km^{2} (150/sq mi)
- Time zone: UTC+01:00 (CET)
  - Summer (DST): UTC+02:00 (CEST)
- INSEE/Postal code: 03132 /03220
- ^{1} French Land Register data, which excludes lakes, ponds, glaciers > 1 km^{2} (0.386 sq mi or 247 acres) and river estuaries.

Jaligny-sur-Besbre (French pronunciation: [ʒaliɲi syʁ bɛbʁ], literally Jaligny on Besbre) is a commune in the Allier department in central France.

== Population ==
Historical population
Year	Pop.	±% p.a.
1968	827	—
1975	778	−0.87%
1982	767	−0.20%
1990	762	−0.08%
1999	694	−1.03%
2007	646	−0.89%
2012	604	−1.34%
2017	575	−0.98%
2023	559	−0.47%
Source: INSEE

== See also ==
- Communes of the Allier department
