= Besbre =

River in central France

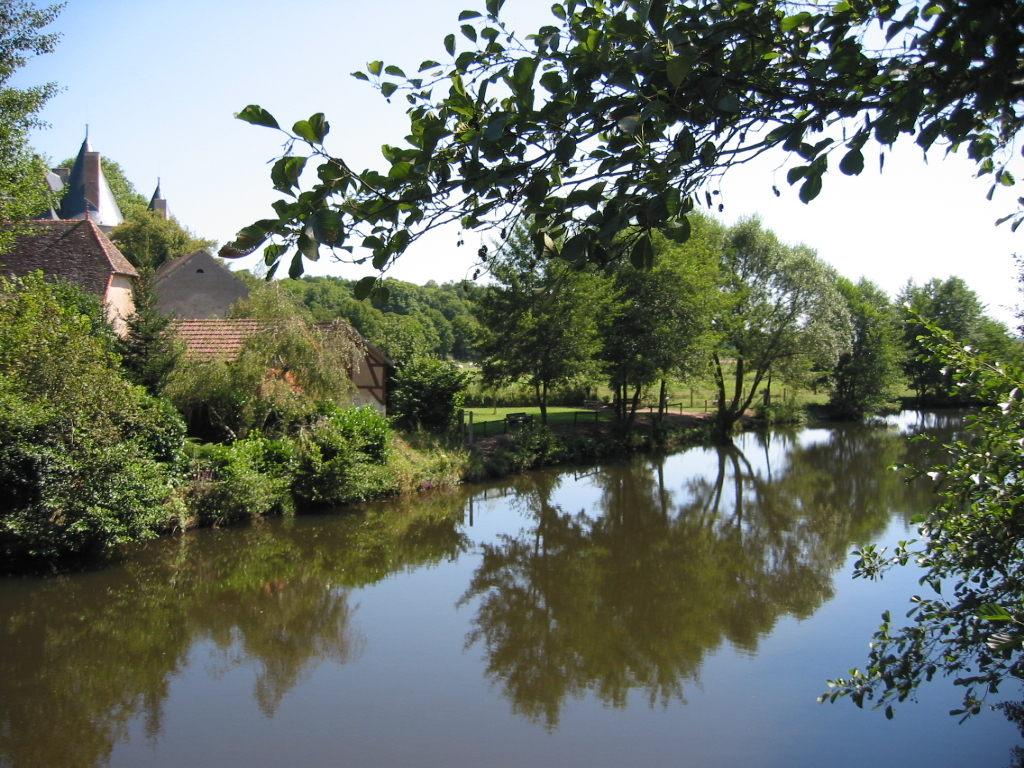
- The Besbre at Jaligny-sur-Besbre

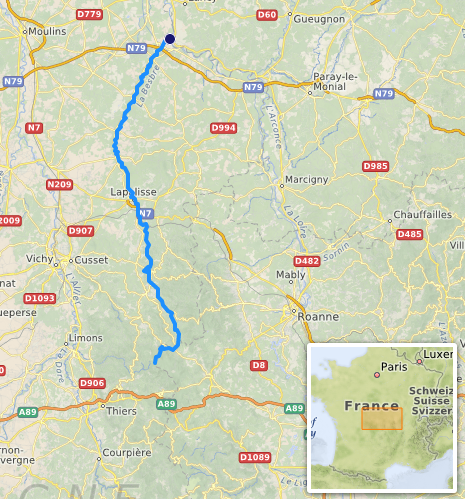

Location
- Country: France

Physical characteristics
- Source
  - location: Massif Central
- Mouth
  - location: Loire
  - coordinates: 46°33′10″N 3°43′54″E
- Length: 106 km (66 mi)
- Basin size: 762 km^{2} (294 mi^{2})

Basin features
- Progression: Loire→ Atlantic Ocean

The Besbre (French pronunciation: [bɛbʁ]) is a river in central France, a left tributary of the Loire. It is 106 km (66 mi) long. Its source is on the mountain of Puy de Montoncel, northeast of Thiers, in the Massif Central. The Besbre flows generally north, through the following departments and towns:

- Allier: Laprugne, Lapalisse, Dompierre-sur-Besbre
- Loire: Saint-Priest-la-Prugne

The Besbre flows into the river Loire 3 kilometres (2 mi) north of Dompierre-sur-Besbre.
