= Canton of Neuilly-le-Réal =

Coordinates: 46°27′54″N 3°25′57″E

Neuilly-le-Réal
- Former canton
- Interactive map of Neuilly-le-Réal
- Country: France
- Region: Auvergne-Rhône-Alpes
- Department: Allier
- No. of communes: {{{nbcomm}}}
- Disbanded: 2015
- Area: 283.64 km^{2} (109.51 sq mi)
- Population (2012): 5,139
  - Density: 18.12/km^{2} (46.93/sq mi)

The canton of Neuilly-le-Réal is a former administrative division in the Arrondissement of Moulins in the Allier department in central France. It was disbanded following the French canton reorganisation which came into effect in March 2015. It consisted of 9 communes, which joined the new canton of Moulins-2 in 2015. It had 5,139 inhabitants (2012).

The canton comprised the following communes:

- Bessay-sur-Allier
- Chapeau
- La Ferté-Hauterive
- Gouise
- Mercy
- Montbeugny
- Neuilly-le-Réal
- Saint-Gérand-de-Vaux
- Saint-Voir

== See also ==
- Cantons of the Allier department
