= A79 autoroute =

Road in France

A79 autoroute
- La Bourbonnaise
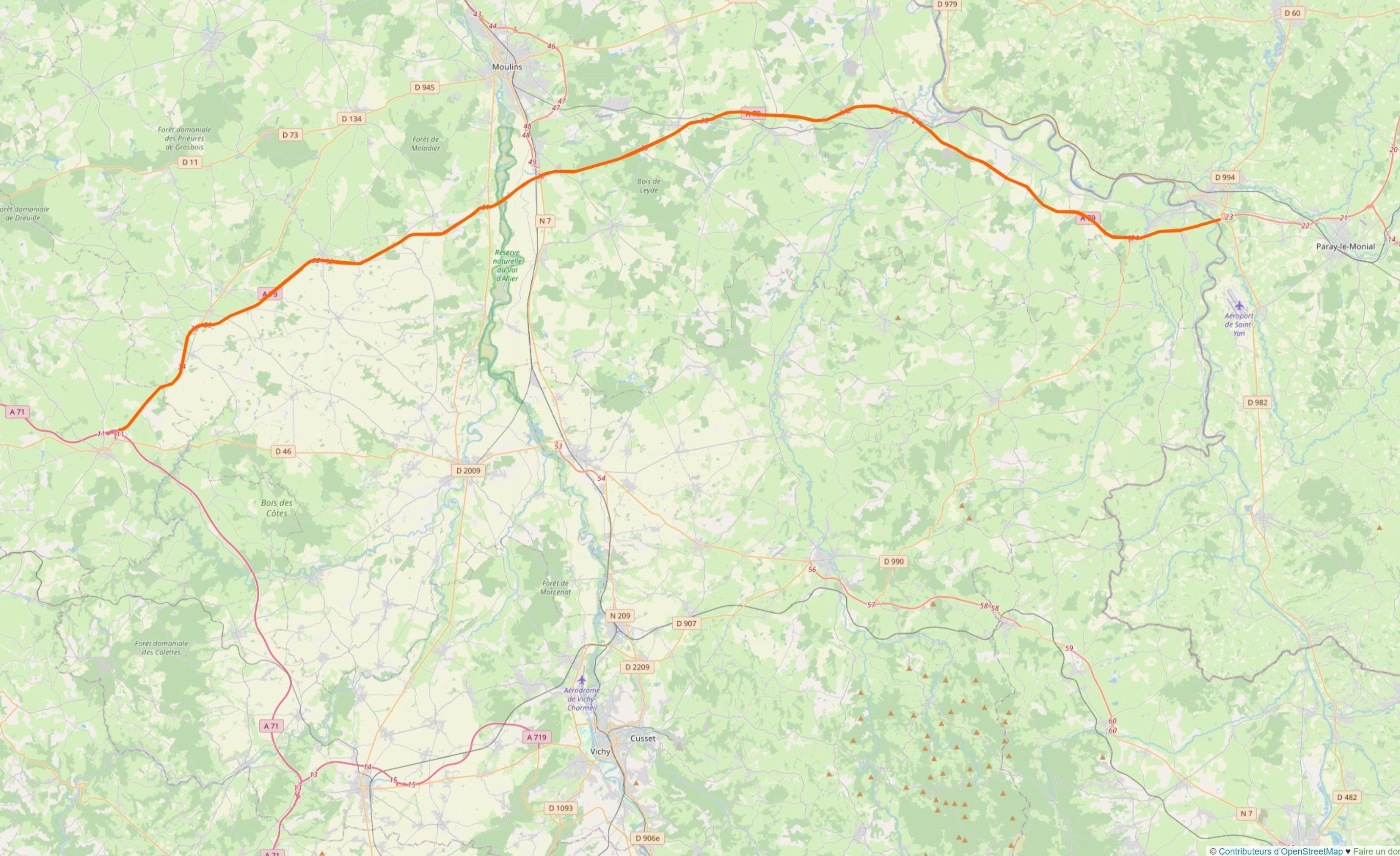

Route information
- Part of E62
- Maintained by APRR and ALIEA
- Length: 92 km (57 mi)
- Existed: 2022–present

Major junctions
- West end: E11 / E62 / A 71 in Montmarault
- N 7 in Toulon-sur-Allier
- East end: E62 / N 79 in Digoin

Location
- Country: France

Highway system
- Roads in France; Autoroutes; Routes nationales

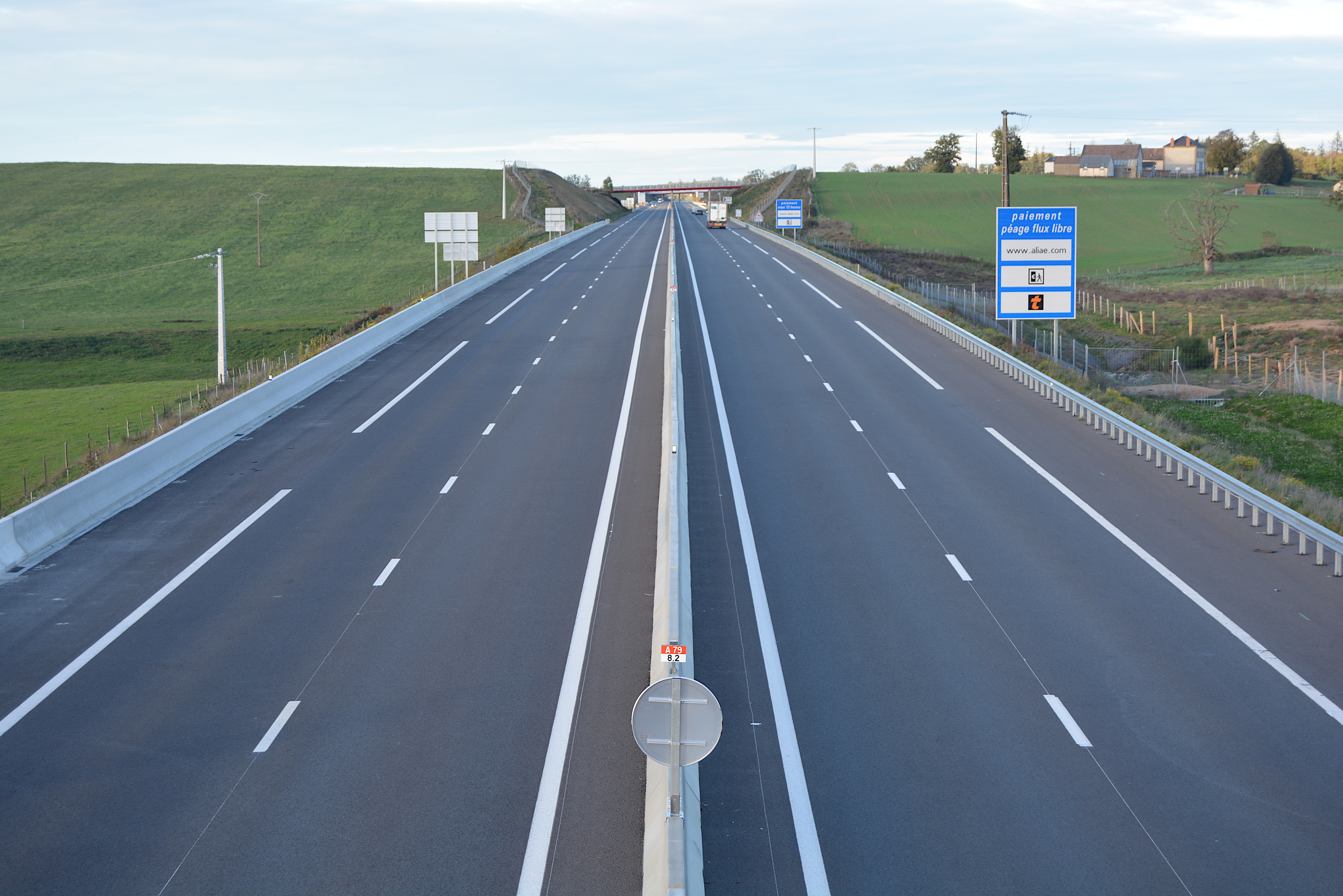
A79 motorway from the bridge of departmental road 297 and half-interchange 34, after the full-track toll of Deux-Chaises (Allier, Auvergne-Rhône-Alpes, France), towards reference point 8.2.

The A79 autoroute (La Bourbonnaise) is a motorway in central France. Opened in November 2022, it connects the A71 autoroute near Sazeret with Moulins and Digoin. It is being extended to the A6 autoroute near Mâcon, which is expected to be completed in 2023. The A79 is an upgrade of the Route nationale 79 to motorway standards.

A79 was also the code for a projected motorway between the A432 autoroute (Lyon-Saint-Exupéry Airport) to A9 autoroute/A61 autoroute (Narbonne) via Valence, Aubenas and Alès. A public inquiry into "Transport in the Rhone Valley and Languedoc Coast" was held between 27 March and 26 July 2006. This new road would avoid the widening of the A7 autoroute to 2×5 lanes between Lyon/Valence and Orange and would offer a credible alternative for traffic to the Rhone Valley. It would serve a host of new communities in several departments (Ardèche, Haute Gard, Haute Vallée de Hérault) would be served: Privas, Aubenas, Alès, Le Vigan. The cost estimated in 2005 was 3.4 billion euros (as a comparison, the widening of the A7 and A9 would cost 1.5 billion euros).

== List of exits and junctions ==
Region	Department	Junction	Destinations	Notes
Auvergne-Rhône-Alpes	Allier	A71 - A79	Montluçon, Paris, Clermont-Ferrand, Montmarault, Commentry, Saint-Pourçain-sur-Sioule, Saint-Éloy-les-Mines	
Auvergne-Rhône-Alpes	Allier	Péage de Deux-Chaises		
Auvergne-Rhône-Alpes	Allier	34 : Deux-Chaises	Deux-Chaises	
Auvergne-Rhône-Alpes	Allier	33 : Le Montet	Le Montet, Tronget, Buxières-les-Mines, Bourbon-l'Archambault	
Auvergne-Rhône-Alpes	Allier	32 : Cressanges	Cressanges, Noyant-d'Allier	
Auvergne-Rhône-Alpes	Allier	32 : Cressanges	Aire de Cressanges	
Auvergne-Rhône-Alpes	Allier	31 : Chemilly	Chemilly, Saint-Pourçain-sur-Sioule, Moulins - La Madeleine, Clermont-Ferrand	
Auvergne-Rhône-Alpes	Allier	RN 7 - A79	Nevers, Moulins - centre Yzeure	
Auvergne-Rhône-Alpes	Allier	30 : Toulon-sur-Allier	Toulon-sur-Allier, Bessay-sur-Allier, Vichy, Neuilly-le-Réal	
Auvergne-Rhône-Alpes	Allier	30 : Toulon-sur-Allier	Aire du Bourbonnais	
Auvergne-Rhône-Alpes	Allier	Péage de Montbeugny		
Auvergne-Rhône-Alpes	Allier	29 : Montbeugny	Montbeugny, Chapeau, Neuilly-le-Réal	
Auvergne-Rhône-Alpes	Allier	28 : Thiel-sur-Acolin	Thiel-sur-Acolin, Parc Le Pal	
Auvergne-Rhône-Alpes	Allier	27 : Dompierre - ouest	Chevagnes, Parc Le Pal	
Auvergne-Rhône-Alpes	Allier	26 : Dompierre - nord	Dompierre-sur-Besbre, Beaulon, Usine Stellantis de Sept-Fons	
Auvergne-Rhône-Alpes	Allier	25 : Dompierre - est	Jaligny-sur-Besbre, Dompierre-sur-Besbre, Bourbon-Lancy	
Auvergne-Rhône-Alpes	Allier	Péage de Molinet		
Auvergne-Rhône-Alpes	Allier	24 : Molinet	Molinet, Digoin - ouest, Le Donjon, Lapalisse, Vichy	
Bourgogne-Franche-Comté	Saône-et-Loire	23 : Digoin	Digoin - centre, Gueugnon, Autun, Roanne	
E62 / A 79 becomes E62 / N 79
1.000 mi = 1.609 km; 1.000 km = 0.621 mi

== Village étape ==
The Autoroute is served by the following two Village étapes, Dompierre-sur-Besbre and Montmarault.
