= Gouise =

- Commune
- Location of Gouise
- Location within France Location within Auvergne-Rhône-Alpes
- Coordinates: 46°24′43″N 3°25′51″E
- Country: France
- Region: Auvergne-Rhône-Alpes
- Department: Allier
- Arrondissement: Moulins
- Canton: Moulins-2
- Intercommunality: CA Moulins Communauté

Government
  - Mayor (2026–32): Annick Deligeard
- Area^{1}: 23.12 km^{2} (8.93 sq mi)
- Elevation: 247 m (810 ft)
- Highest elevation: 294 m (965 ft)
- Lowest elevation: 230 m (750 ft)
- Population (2023): 219
  - Density: 9.47/km^{2} (24.5/sq mi)
- Time zone: UTC+01:00 (CET)
  - Summer (DST): UTC+02:00 (CEST)
- INSEE/Postal code: 03124 /03340
- ^{1} French Land Register data, which excludes lakes, ponds, glaciers > 1 km^{2} (0.386 sq mi or 247 acres) and river estuaries.

Gouise (French pronunciation: [ɡwiz]) is a commune in the Allier department in central France.

This small village is situated at the crossing of two secondary departmental roads, the D102 (East-West from Saint-Voir to Bessay-sur-Allier) and the D105 (North-South from Neuilly-le-Réal to Saint-Gérand-de-Vaux). Oddly, it has no church but a small town hall with an adjacent meeting room.

== Population ==
Historical population
Year	Pop.	±% p.a.
1968	291	—
1975	227	−3.49%
1982	193	−2.29%
1990	220	+1.65%
1999	216	−0.20%
2007	218	+0.12%
2012	237	+1.69%
2017	219	−1.57%
2023	219	+0.00%
Source: INSEE

== Economy ==
Gouise lives mainly on farming (cattle) and tourism (bed and breakfast). There is also a construction work company. Other people live there but go to work in town (Moulins) or in neighbouring villages.

== See also ==
- Communes of the Allier department
