= Route nationale 79 =

Road in France

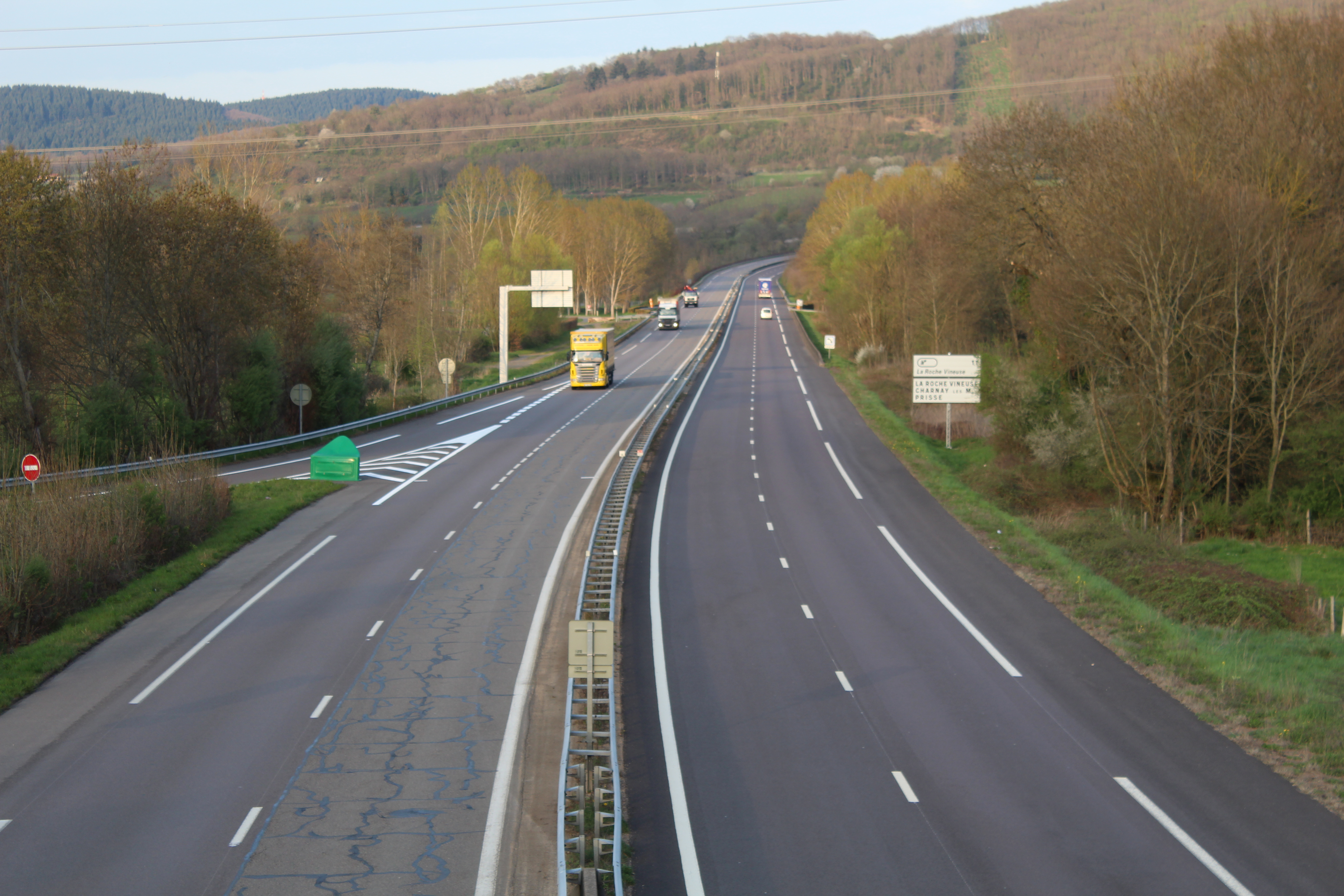
The route to Sainte-Cécile in the direction of the Col du Bois Clair.

Route nationale 79, or RN 79, is a French national road connecting Montmarault to Mâcon. Totalling 167 kilometers long, it is a section of the Atlantic Central European Route. RN79 passes through the mountain pass Col du Bois Clair near Sologny. It is being upgraded to motorway A79; the western section of this was completed in November 2022.

== Village étape ==
The Autoroute has one Village étape, Charolles.
