= XMU =

XMU may refer to:

- libxmu, a library for programming on the X Window System
- Moulins - Montbeugny Airport, an airport in France with IATA code XMU.
- Sirius XMU, a radio channel on Sirius XM Radio which plays unsigned artists.
- Xiamen University in China
  - Xiamen University Malaysia
- Xinjiang Medical University in China
