= Marc Antoine Baudot =

French physician and memoirist

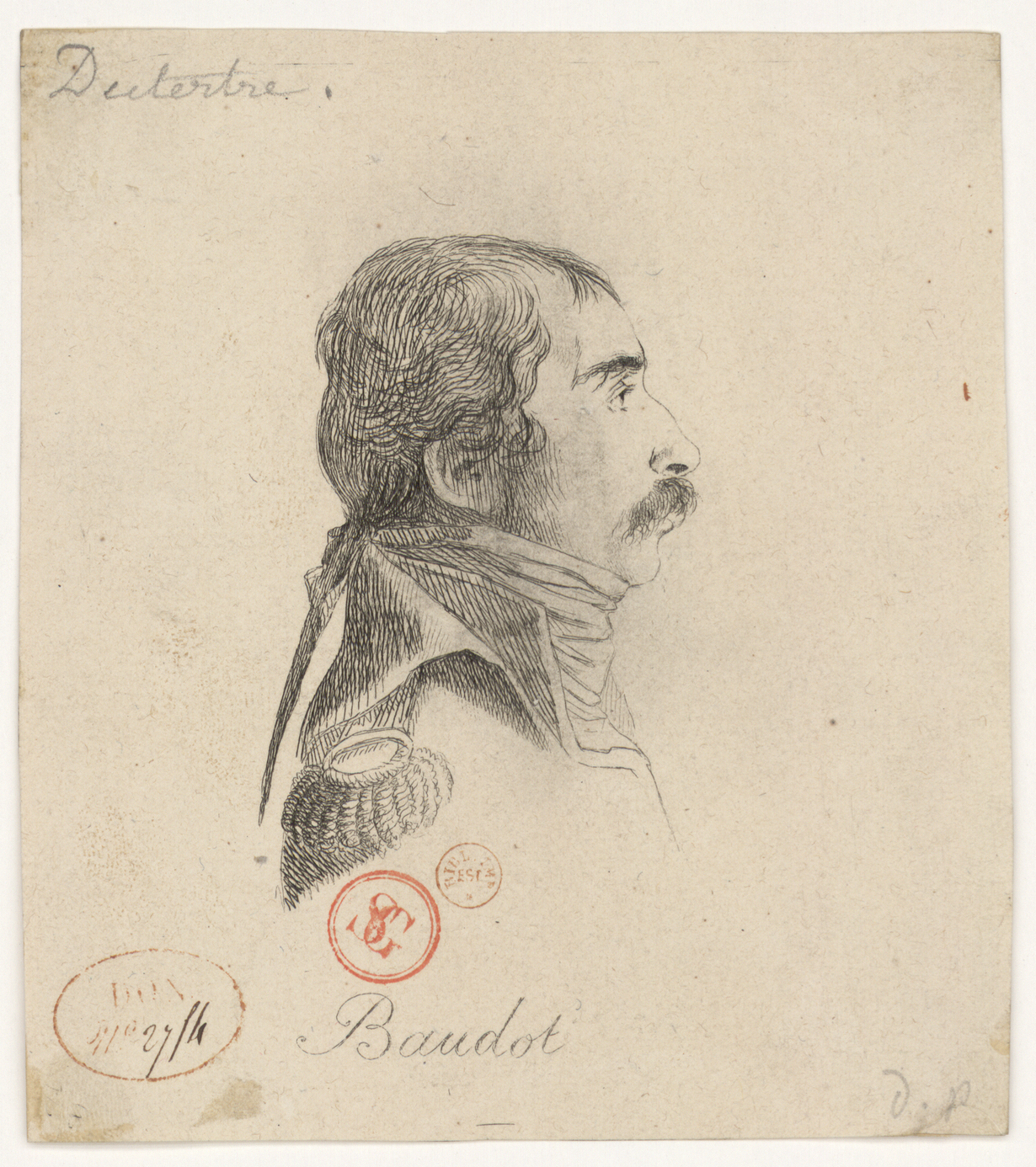

Marc Antoine Baudot (French: [maʁk ɑ̃twan bodo]; 18 March 1765, Liernolles, Bourbonnais – 23 March 1837) was a French politician, memoirist and medical doctor born in Liernolles, later active in Dijon.

== Biography ==
France became a constitutional monarchy under the Constitution of September 3, 1791. Marc Antoine Baudot was elected alternate deputy for the Saône-et-Loire department—the first of four—to the Legislative Assembly (France). He was called upon to take his seat following the resignation of Charles Desplaces. In August 1792, he voted in favor of impeaching the Marquis de Lafayette.

In September, Marc Antoine Baudot was reelected as a deputy from Saône-et-Loire—the seventh of eleven—to the National Convention.
