= Col du Bois Clair =

Mountain pass in Saône-et-Loire, France

Coordinates: 46.384°N 4.668°E

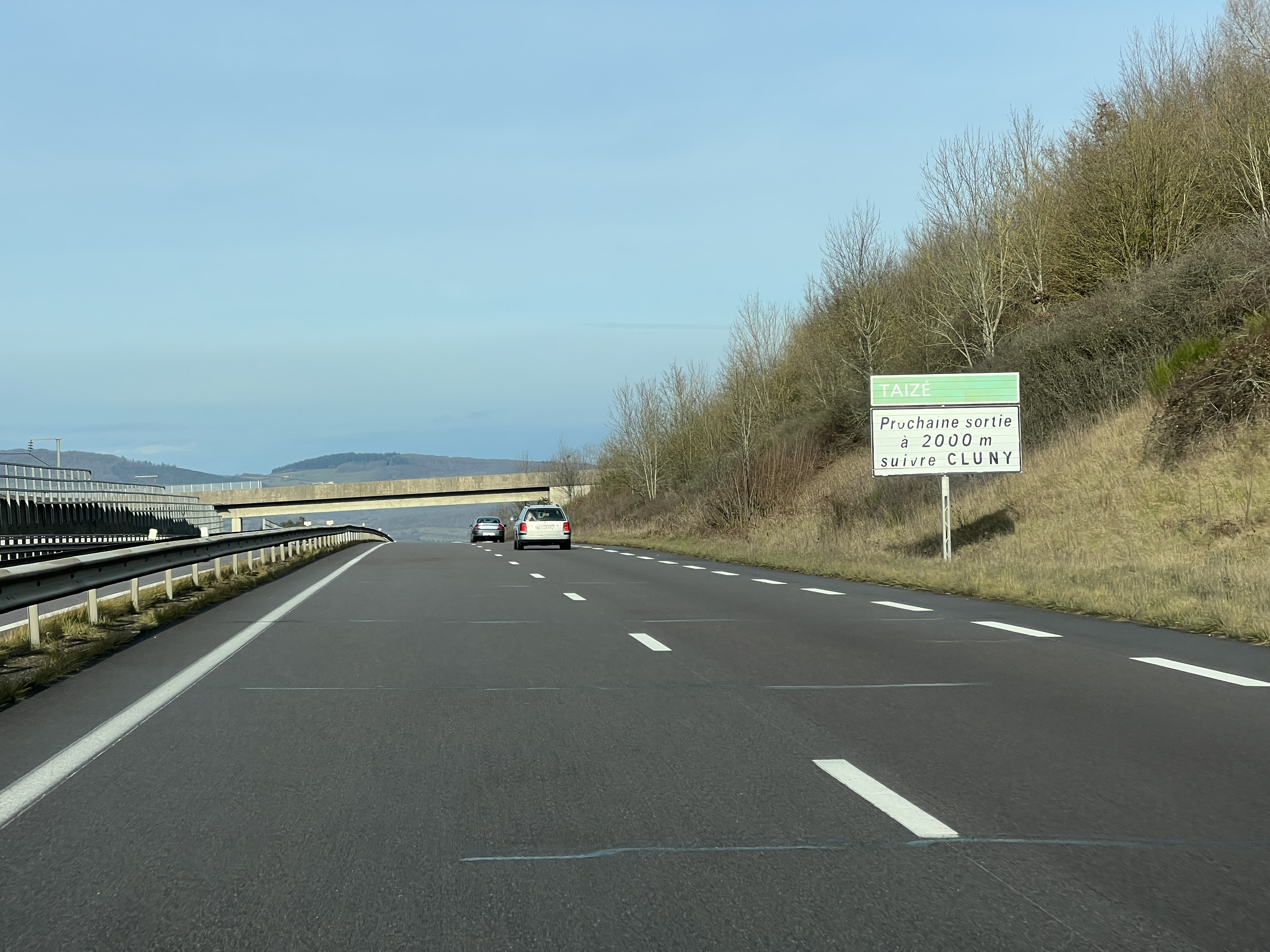
Col du Bois Clair on national road 79, Sologny.

The Col du Bois Clair (394 m) is a low pass near Sologny, west of Mâcon in the French department of Saône et Loire. It is traversed by Route nationale 79, which connects Mâcon with Paray-le-Monial.
