= Sorbier (disambiguation) =

Sorbier is a commune in the Allier department in central France.

Sorbier may also refer to:

- Franck Sorbier, Paris fashion house that achieved haute couture status in 2005
- Jean-Barthélemot Sorbier (1762–1827), French general of the Napoleonic Wars

== See also ==
- Sorbiers (disambiguation)
