= Trézelles =

- Commune
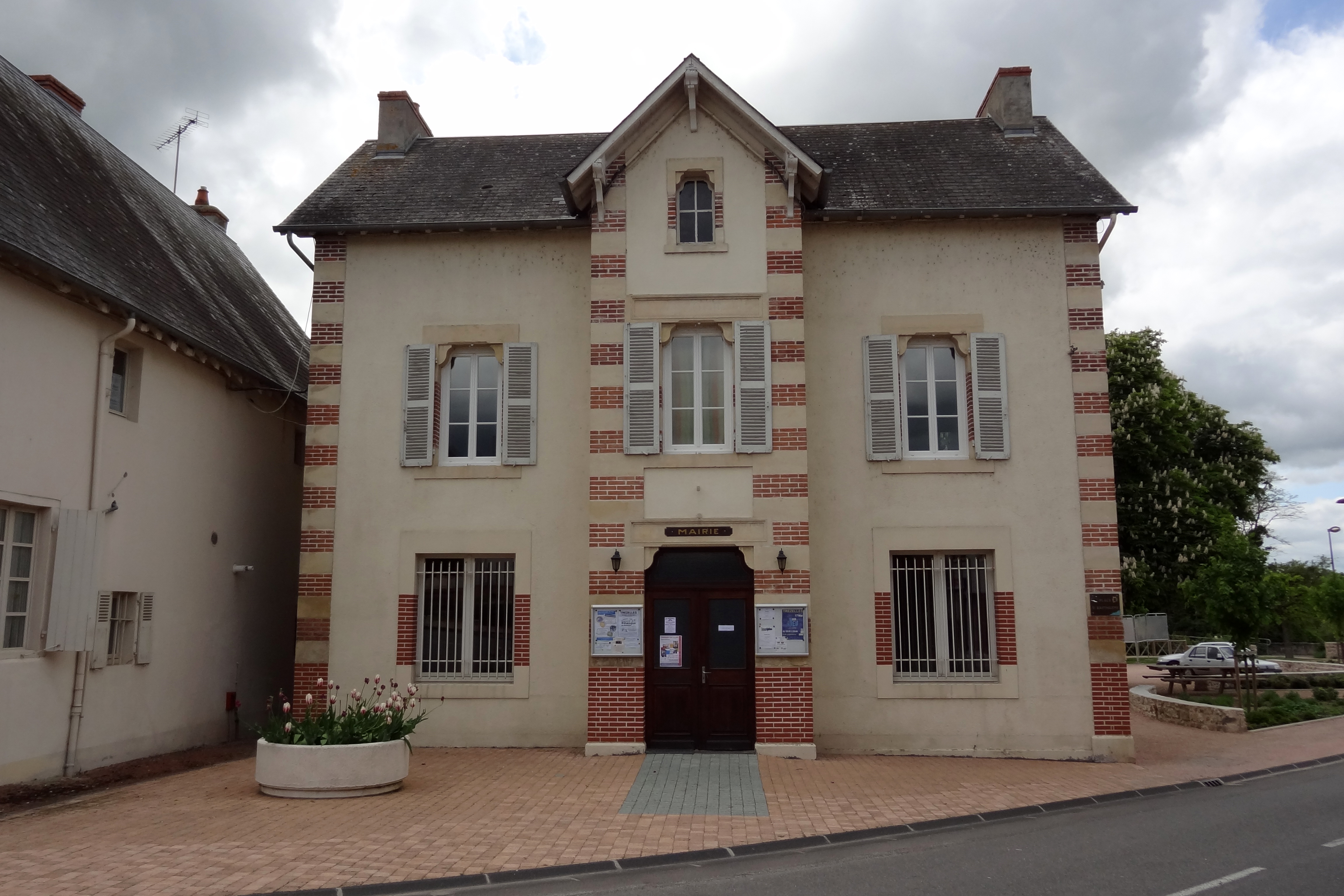
- The town hall in Trezelles
- Location of Trézelles
- Location within France Location within Auvergne-Rhône-Alpes
- Coordinates: 46°19′47″N 3°35′35″E
- Country: France
- Region: Auvergne-Rhône-Alpes
- Department: Allier
- Arrondissement: Vichy
- Canton: Moulins-2
- Intercommunality: Entr'Allier Besbre et Loire

Government
  - Mayor (2026–32): Alain Vernisse
- Area^{1}: 18.14 km^{2} (7.00 sq mi)
- Elevation: 256 m (840 ft)
- Highest elevation: 330 m (1,080 ft)
- Lowest elevation: 250 m (820 ft)
- Population (2023): 391
  - Density: 21.6/km^{2} (55.8/sq mi)
- Time zone: UTC+01:00 (CET)
  - Summer (DST): UTC+02:00 (CEST)
- INSEE/Postal code: 03291 /03220
- Website: http://trezelles.interco-abl.eu
- ^{1} French Land Register data, which excludes lakes, ponds, glaciers > 1 km^{2} (0.386 sq mi or 247 acres) and river estuaries.

Trézelles (French pronunciation: [tʁezɛl]) is a commune in the Allier department in Auvergne-Rhône-Alpes in central France.

== Population ==
Historical population
| Year | Pop. | ±% p.a. |
|---|---|---|
| 1968 | 562 | — |
| 1975 | 521 | −1.08% |
| 1982 | 453 | −1.98% |
| 1990 | 414 | −1.12% |
| 1999 | 395 | −0.52% |
| 2007 | 383 | −0.38% |
| 2012 | 391 | +0.41% |
| 2017 | 404 | +0.66% |
| 2023 | 391 | −0.54% |
Source: INSEE

== See also ==
- Communes of the Allier department
