= Sorbiers =

Sorbiers may refer to the following places in France:

- Sorbiers, Hautes-Alpes, a commune in the department of Hautes-Alpes
- Sorbiers, Loire, a commune in the department of Loire

== See also ==
- Sorbier (disambiguation)
