= Moulins–Montbeugny Airport =

Moulins–Montbeugny Airport Aérodrome de Moulins–Montbeugny
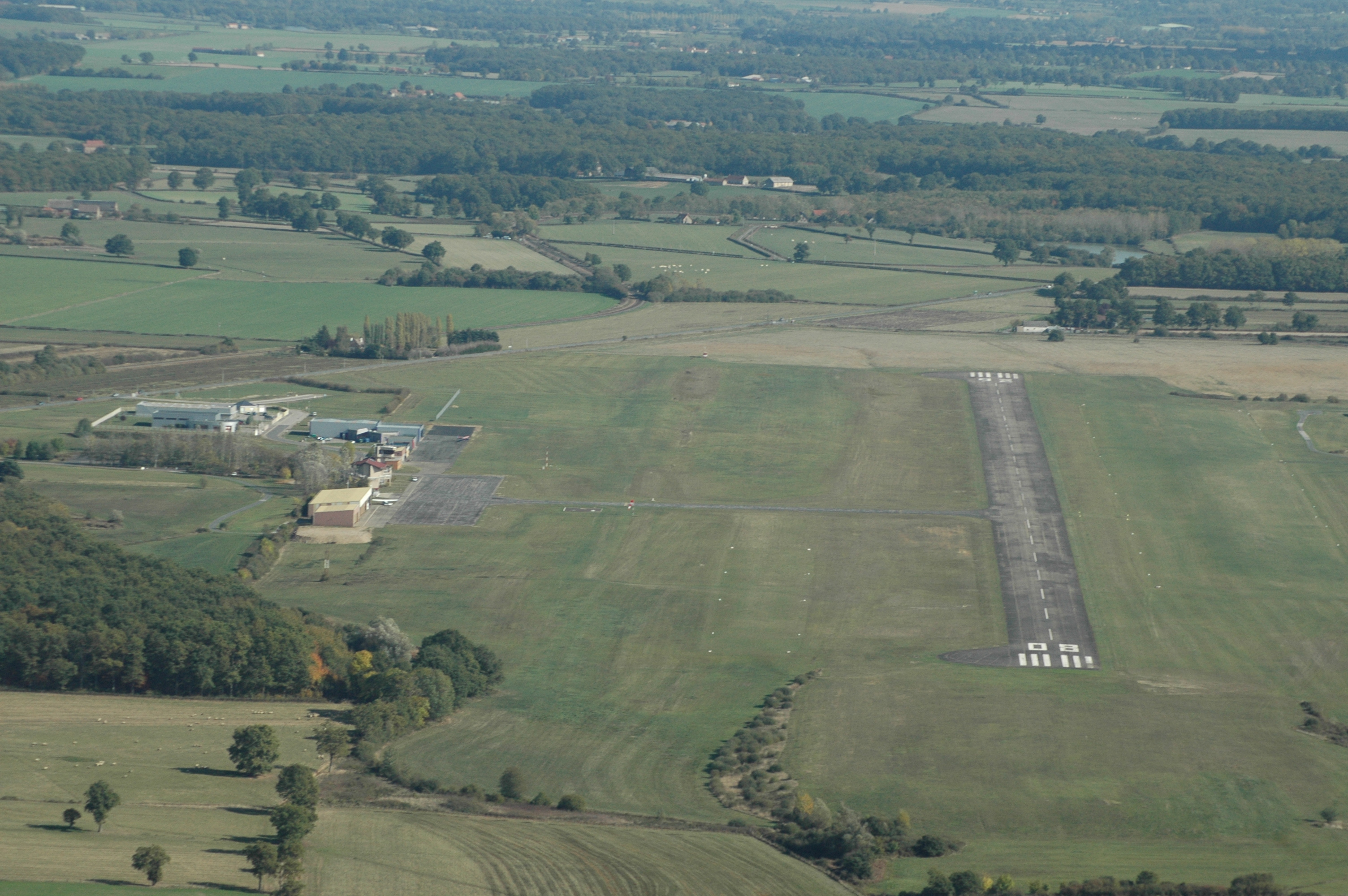
- IATA: none; ICAO: LFHY

Summary
- Airport type: Public
- Operator: CCI de Moulins et Vichy
- Serves: Moulins / Montbeugny, France
- Location: Toulon-sur-Allier
- Elevation AMSL: 915 ft / 279 m
- Coordinates: 46°32′04″N 003°25′18″E

Map
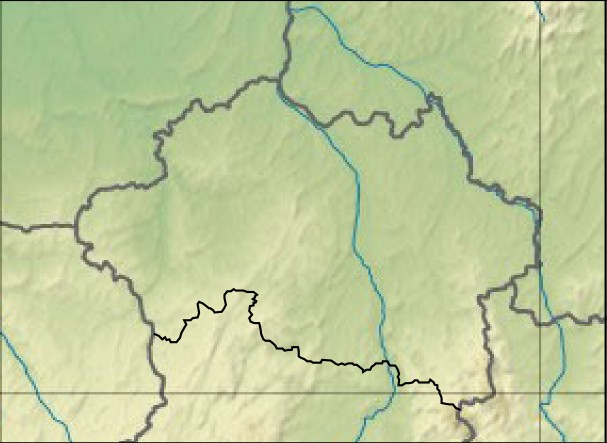
- Location of airport in Allier department Location of Allier department in France

Runways
| Direction | Length | | Surface |
| Direction | m | ft | Surface |
|---|---|---|---|
| 08/26 | 1,300 | 4,265 | Asphalt |
| 08R/26L | 843 | 2,766 | Grass |
| 08L/26R | 330 | 1,083 | Grass |
- Source: AIP France

Moulins–Montbeugny Airport (French: Aérodrome de Moulins–Montbeugny) (ICAO: LFHY) is an aerodrome or airport located in Toulon-sur-Allier, 7 km (4 NM) southeast of Moulins and west of Montbeugny, all communes in the Allier department of the Auvergne region in central France.

== Facilities ==
The airport resides at an elevation of 915 feet (279 m) above mean sea level. It has one runway designated 08/26 with an asphalt surface measuring 1,300 by 30 metres (4,265 ft × 98 ft). There are also two parallel grass runways measuring 843 by 80 metres (2,766 ft × 262 ft) and 330 by 30 metres (1,083 ft × 98 ft).

== Airlines and destinations ==
There is no scheduled commercial air service at this time.
