= Treteau =

- Commune
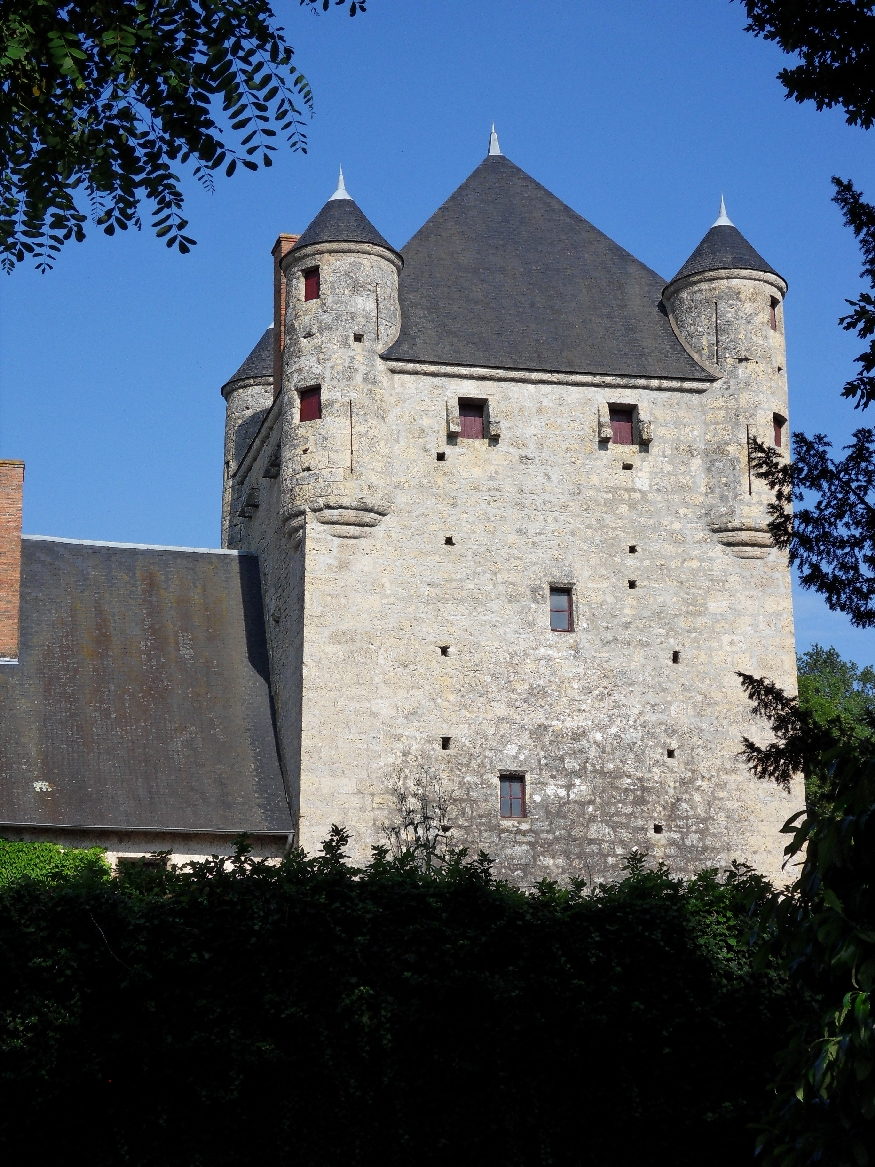
- The château in Treteau
- Location of Treteau
- Location within France Location within Auvergne-Rhône-Alpes
- Coordinates: 46°22′06″N 3°31′36″E
- Country: France
- Region: Auvergne-Rhône-Alpes
- Department: Allier
- Arrondissement: Vichy
- Canton: Moulins-2
- Intercommunality: Entr'Allier Besbre et Loire

Government
  - Mayor (2026–32): Didier Gaudrat
- Area^{1}: 31.28 km^{2} (12.08 sq mi)
- Elevation: 283 m (928 ft)
- Highest elevation: 307 m (1,007 ft)
- Lowest elevation: 253 m (830 ft)
- Population (2023): 520
  - Density: 17/km^{2} (43/sq mi)
- Time zone: UTC+01:00 (CET)
  - Summer (DST): UTC+02:00 (CEST)
- INSEE/Postal code: 03289 /03220
- ^{1} French Land Register data, which excludes lakes, ponds, glaciers > 1 km^{2} (0.386 sq mi or 247 acres) and river estuaries.

Treteau is a commune in the Allier department in Auvergne-Rhône-Alpes in central France.

== Population ==
Historical population
Year	Pop.	±% p.a.
1968	756	—
1975	655	−2.03%
1982	603	−1.17%
1990	560	−0.92%
1999	514	−0.95%
2007	543	+0.69%
2012	564	+0.76%
2017	519	−1.65%
2023	520	+0.03%
Source: INSEE

== See also ==
- Communes of the Allier department
