= Bert, Allier =

Bert
- Commune
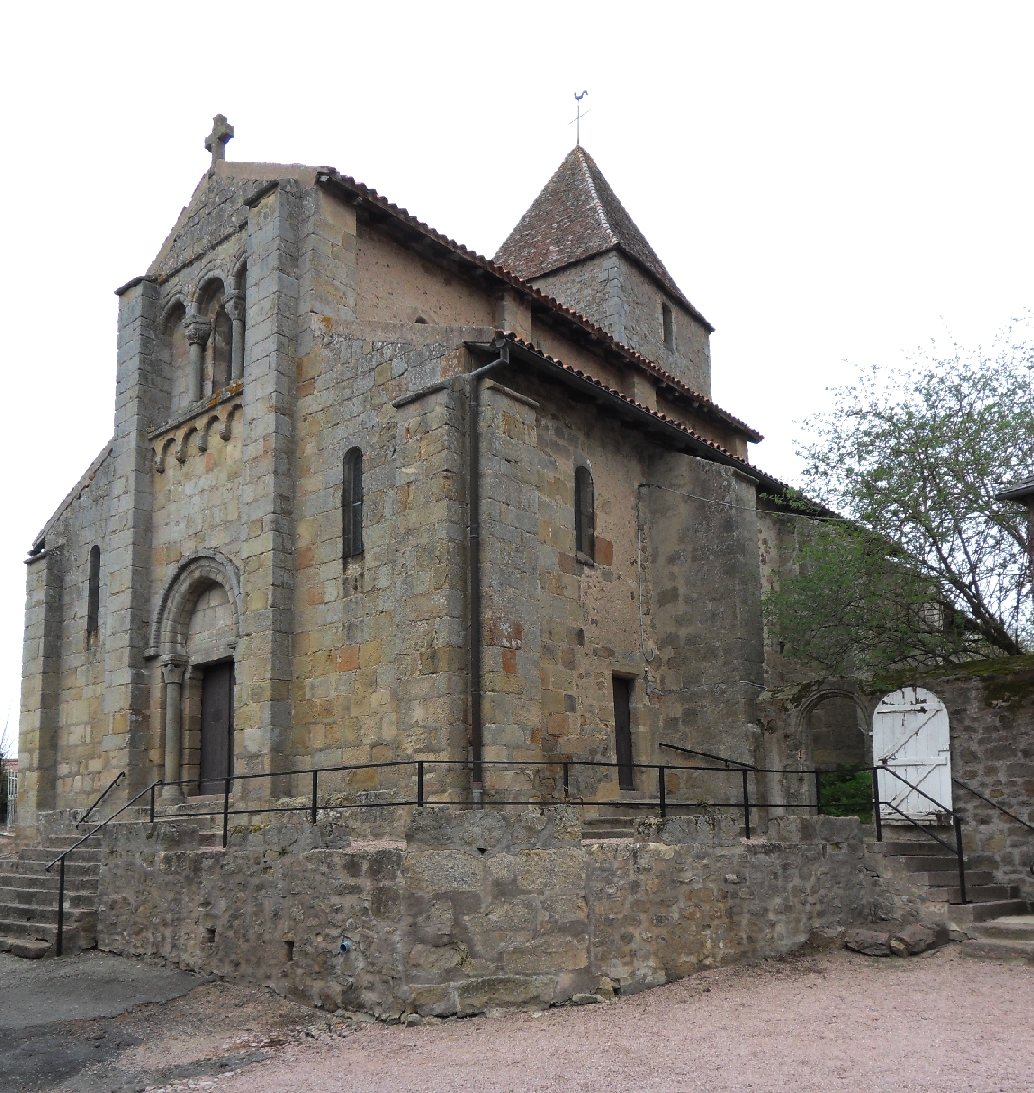
- The church in Bert

- Coat of arms
- Location of Bert
- Location within France Location within Auvergne-Rhône-Alpes
- Coordinates: 46°19′32″N 3°42′28″E
- Country: France
- Region: Auvergne-Rhône-Alpes
- Department: Allier
- Arrondissement: Vichy
- Canton: Moulins-2
- Intercommunality: Pays de Lapalisse

Government
  - Mayor (2026–32): Michel Vivier
- Area^{1}: 24.15 km^{2} (9.32 sq mi)
- Elevation: 314 m (1,030 ft)
- Highest elevation: 487 m (1,598 ft)
- Lowest elevation: 285 m (935 ft)
- Population (2023): 274
  - Density: 11.3/km^{2} (29.4/sq mi)
- Demonym: Bertois
- Time zone: UTC+01:00 (CET)
  - Summer (DST): UTC+02:00 (CEST)
- INSEE/Postal code: 03024 /03130
- ^{1} French Land Register data, which excludes lakes, ponds, glaciers > 1 km^{2} (0.386 sq mi or 247 acres) and river estuaries.

Bert (French pronunciation: [bɛʁ]) is a commune in the Allier department in central France.

== Population ==
Its inhabitants are called Bertois in French.

Historical population
Year	Pop.	±% p.a.
1968	514	—
1975	415	−3.01%
1982	410	−0.17%
1990	315	−3.24%
1999	273	−1.58%
2007	269	−0.18%
2012	255	−1.06%
2017	243	−0.96%
2023	274	+2.02%
Source: INSEE

== Administration ==
- 2008–2020: Jacques Caillault
- 2020–2026: Michel Vivier

== See also ==
- Communes of the Allier department
