= Cindré =

- Commune
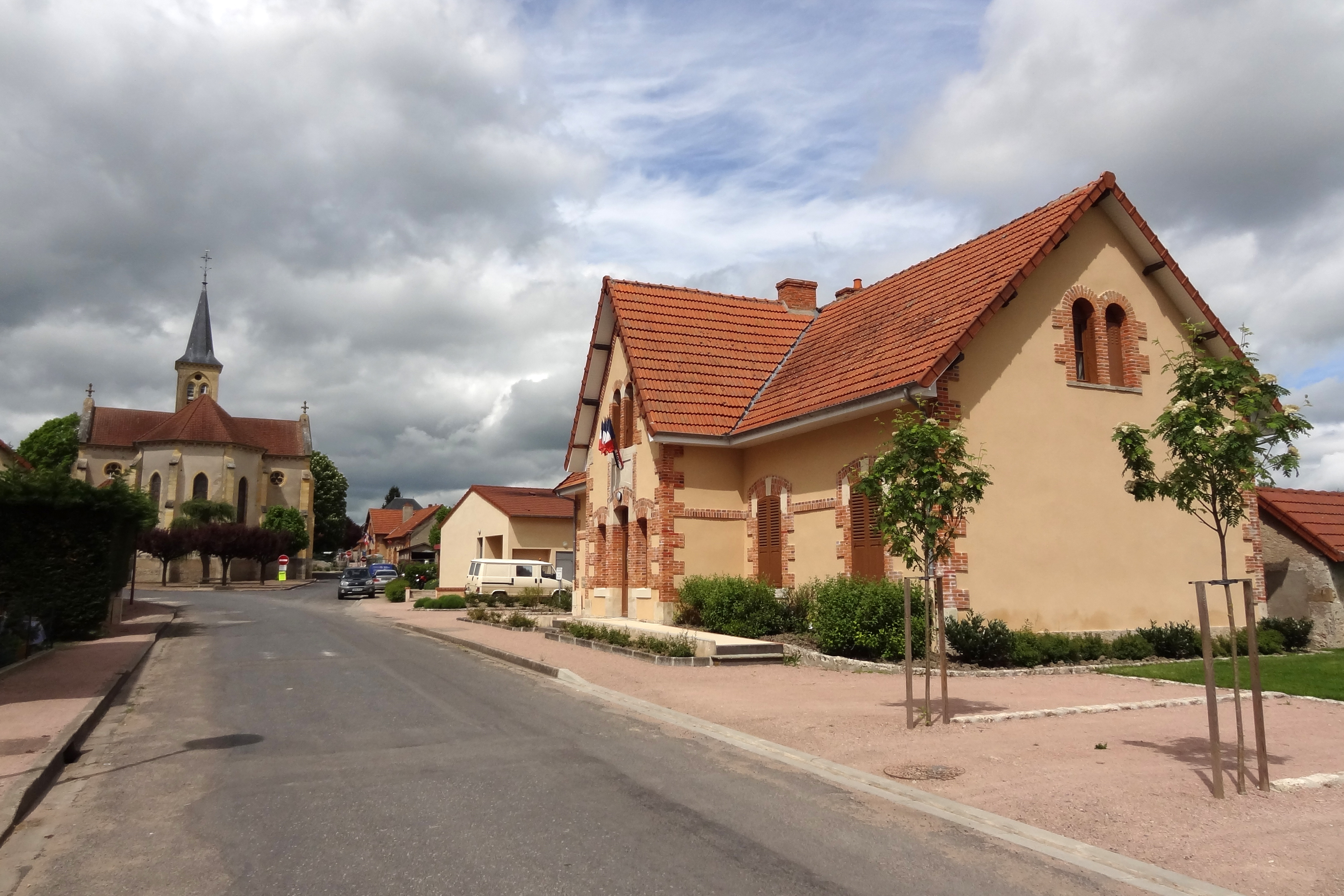
- The town hall and church in Cindré
- Location of Cindré
- Location within France Location within Auvergne-Rhône-Alpes
- Coordinates: 46°19′39″N 3°34′00″E
- Country: France
- Region: Auvergne-Rhône-Alpes
- Department: Allier
- Arrondissement: Vichy
- Canton: Moulins-2
- Intercommunality: Entr'Allier Besbre et Loire

Government
  - Mayor (2026–32): René Pinson
- Area^{1}: 22.63 km^{2} (8.74 sq mi)
- Elevation: 300 m (980 ft)
- Highest elevation: 342 m (1,122 ft)
- Lowest elevation: 254 m (833 ft)
- Population (2023): 276
  - Density: 12.2/km^{2} (31.6/sq mi)
- Time zone: UTC+01:00 (CET)
  - Summer (DST): UTC+02:00 (CEST)
- INSEE/Postal code: 03079 /03220
- ^{1} French Land Register data, which excludes lakes, ponds, glaciers > 1 km^{2} (0.386 sq mi or 247 acres) and river estuaries.

Cindré (French pronunciation: [sɛ̃dʁe]) is a commune in the Allier department in central France.

== Population ==
Historical population
Year	Pop.	±% p.a.
1968	532	—
1975	430	−3.00%
1982	359	−2.55%
1990	313	−1.70%
1999	313	+0.00%
2007	314	+0.04%
2012	328	+0.88%
2017	301	−1.70%
2023	276	−1.43%
Source: INSEE

== See also ==
- Communes of the Allier department
