= Chavroches =

- Commune
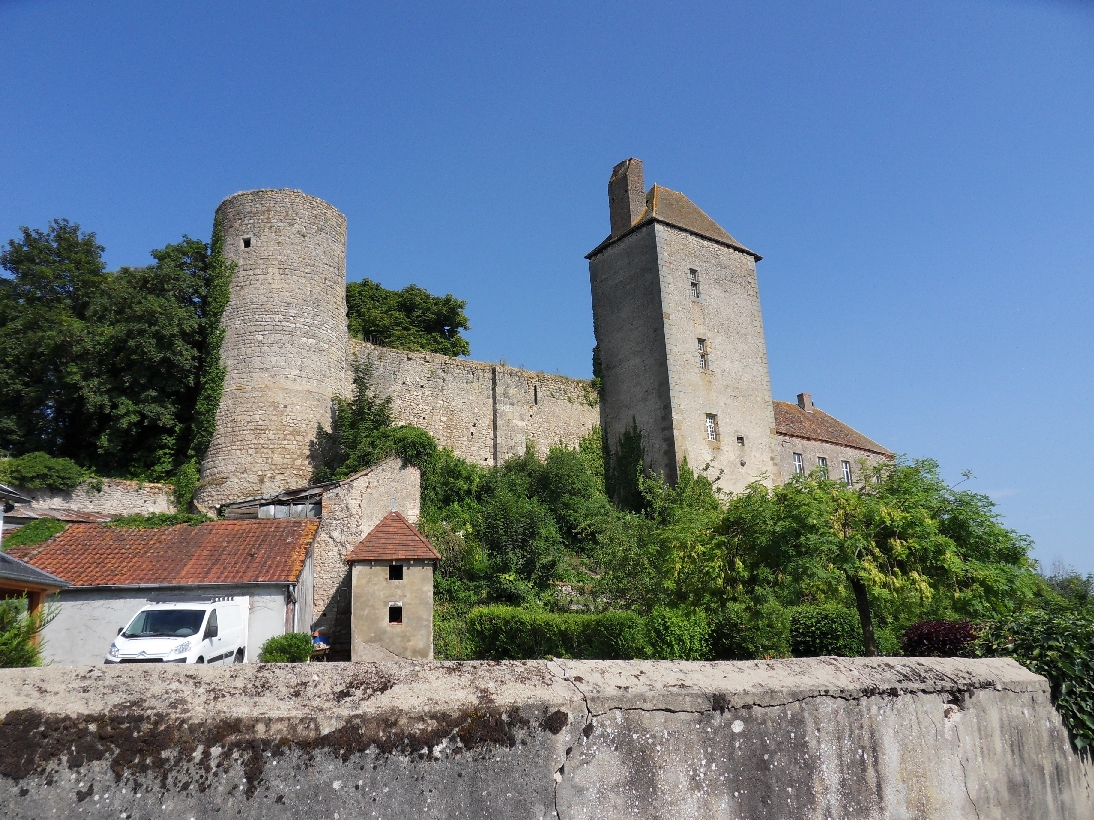
- The castle in Chavroches
- Location of Chavroches
- Location within France Location within Auvergne-Rhône-Alpes
- Coordinates: 46°21′19″N 3°35′17″E
- Country: France
- Region: Auvergne-Rhône-Alpes
- Department: Allier
- Arrondissement: Vichy
- Canton: Moulins-2
- Intercommunality: Entr'Allier Besbre et Loire

Government
  - Mayor (2026–32): Jean-François Tocant
- Area^{1}: 9.95 km^{2} (3.84 sq mi)
- Elevation: 260 m (850 ft)
- Highest elevation: 331 m (1,086 ft)
- Lowest elevation: 247 m (810 ft)
- Population (2023): 268
  - Density: 26.9/km^{2} (69.8/sq mi)
- Time zone: UTC+01:00 (CET)
  - Summer (DST): UTC+02:00 (CEST)
- INSEE/Postal code: 03071 /03220
- ^{1} French Land Register data, which excludes lakes, ponds, glaciers > 1 km^{2} (0.386 sq mi or 247 acres) and river estuaries.

Chavroches (French pronunciation: [ʃavʁɔʃ]) is a commune in the Allier department in central France.

== Population ==
Historical population
Year	Pop.	±% p.a.
1968	451	—
1975	397	−1.81%
1982	330	−2.61%
1990	270	−2.48%
1999	248	−0.94%
2007	279	+1.48%
2012	260	−1.40%
2017	247	−1.02%
2023	268	+1.37%
Source: INSEE

== See also ==
- Communes of the Allier department
