= Saint-Léon, Allier =

Saint-Léon
- Commune
- Location of Saint-Léon
- Location within France Location within Auvergne-Rhône-Alpes
- Coordinates: 46°24′12″N 3°41′15″E
- Country: France
- Region: Auvergne-Rhône-Alpes
- Department: Allier
- Arrondissement: Vichy
- Canton: Moulins-2
- Intercommunality: Entr'Allier Besbre et Loire

Government
  - Mayor (2026–32): Christian Lafaye
- Area^{1}: 33.62 km^{2} (12.98 sq mi)
- Elevation: 360 m (1,180 ft)
- Highest elevation: 436 m (1,430 ft)
- Lowest elevation: 245 m (804 ft)
- Population (2023): 530
  - Density: 16/km^{2} (41/sq mi)
- Time zone: UTC+01:00 (CET)
  - Summer (DST): UTC+02:00 (CEST)
- INSEE/Postal code: 03240 /03220
- ^{1} French Land Register data, which excludes lakes, ponds, glaciers > 1 km^{2} (0.386 sq mi or 247 acres) and river estuaries.

Saint-Léon (French pronunciation: [sɛ̃ leɔ̃]) is a commune in the Allier department in Auvergne-Rhône-Alpes in central France.

== Population ==
Historical population
Year	Pop.	±% p.a.
1968	893	—
1975	858	−0.57%
1982	773	−1.48%
1990	721	−0.87%
1999	652	−1.11%
2007	607	−0.89%
2012	614	+0.23%
2017	549	−2.21%
2023	530	−0.59%
Source: INSEE

== See also ==
- Communes of the Allier department
