= Sorbier =

- Commune
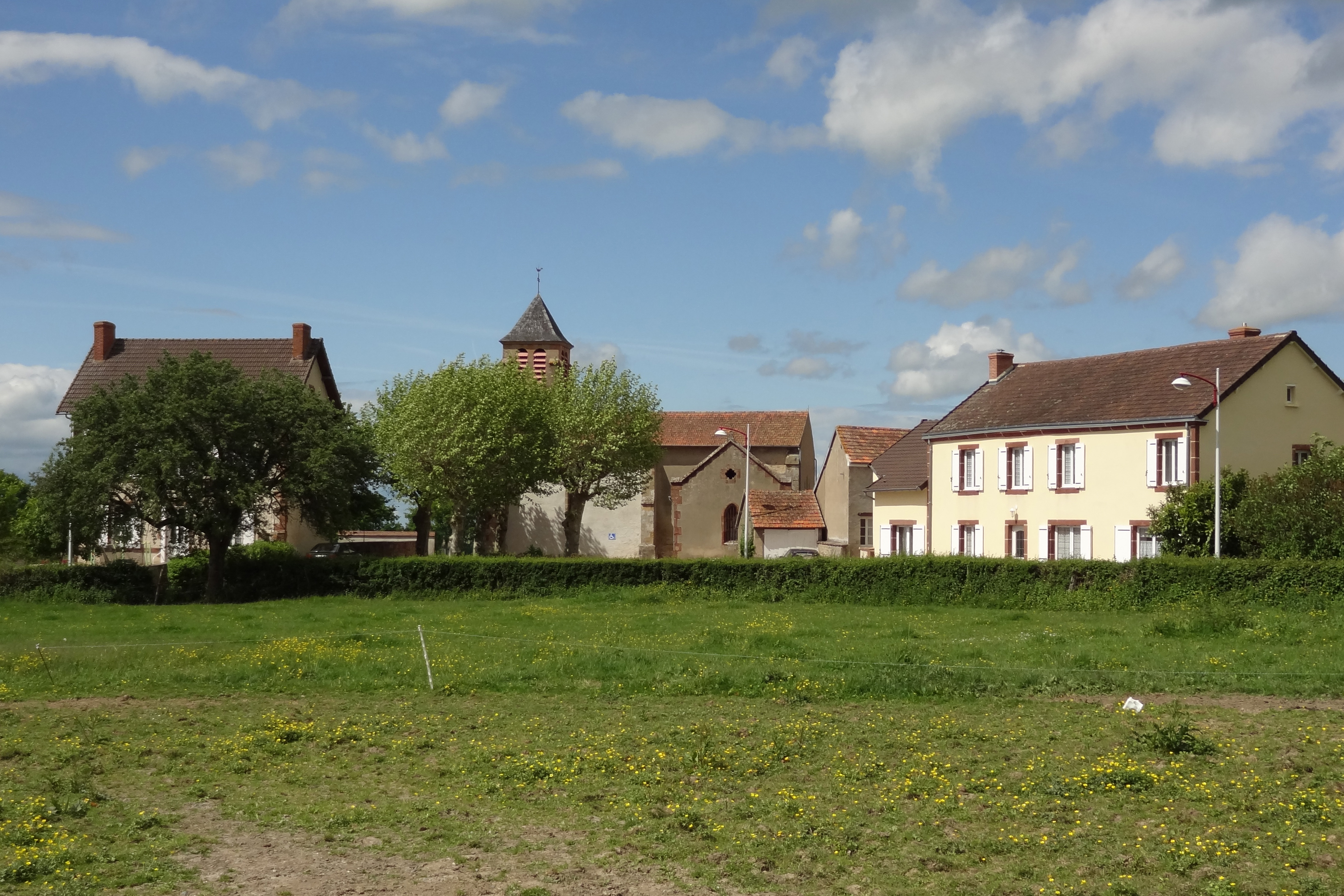
- A general view of Sorbier

- Coat of arms
- Location of Sorbier
- Location within France Location within Auvergne-Rhône-Alpes
- Coordinates: 46°21′58″N 3°39′41″E
- Country: France
- Region: Auvergne-Rhône-Alpes
- Department: Allier
- Arrondissement: Vichy
- Canton: Moulins-2
- Intercommunality: Entr'Allier Besbre et Loire

Government
  - Mayor (2026–32): Jean-Philippe Jallet
- Area^{1}: 17.09 km^{2} (6.60 sq mi)
- Elevation: 355 m (1,165 ft)
- Highest elevation: 394 m (1,293 ft)
- Lowest elevation: 266 m (873 ft)
- Population (2023): 318
  - Density: 18.6/km^{2} (48.2/sq mi)
- Time zone: UTC+01:00 (CET)
  - Summer (DST): UTC+02:00 (CEST)
- INSEE/Postal code: 03274 /03220
- ^{1} French Land Register data, which excludes lakes, ponds, glaciers > 1 km^{2} (0.386 sq mi or 247 acres) and river estuaries.

Sorbier (French pronunciation: [sɔʁbje]) is a commune in the Allier department in Auvergne-Rhône-Alpes in central France.

== Population ==
Historical population
Year	Pop.	±% p.a.
1968	471	—
1975	422	−1.56%
1982	364	−2.09%
1990	310	−1.99%
1999	307	−0.11%
2007	285	−0.93%
2012	294	+0.62%
2017	315	+1.39%
2023	318	+0.16%
Source: INSEE

== See also ==
- Communes of the Allier department
