= La Ferté-Hauterive =

- Commune
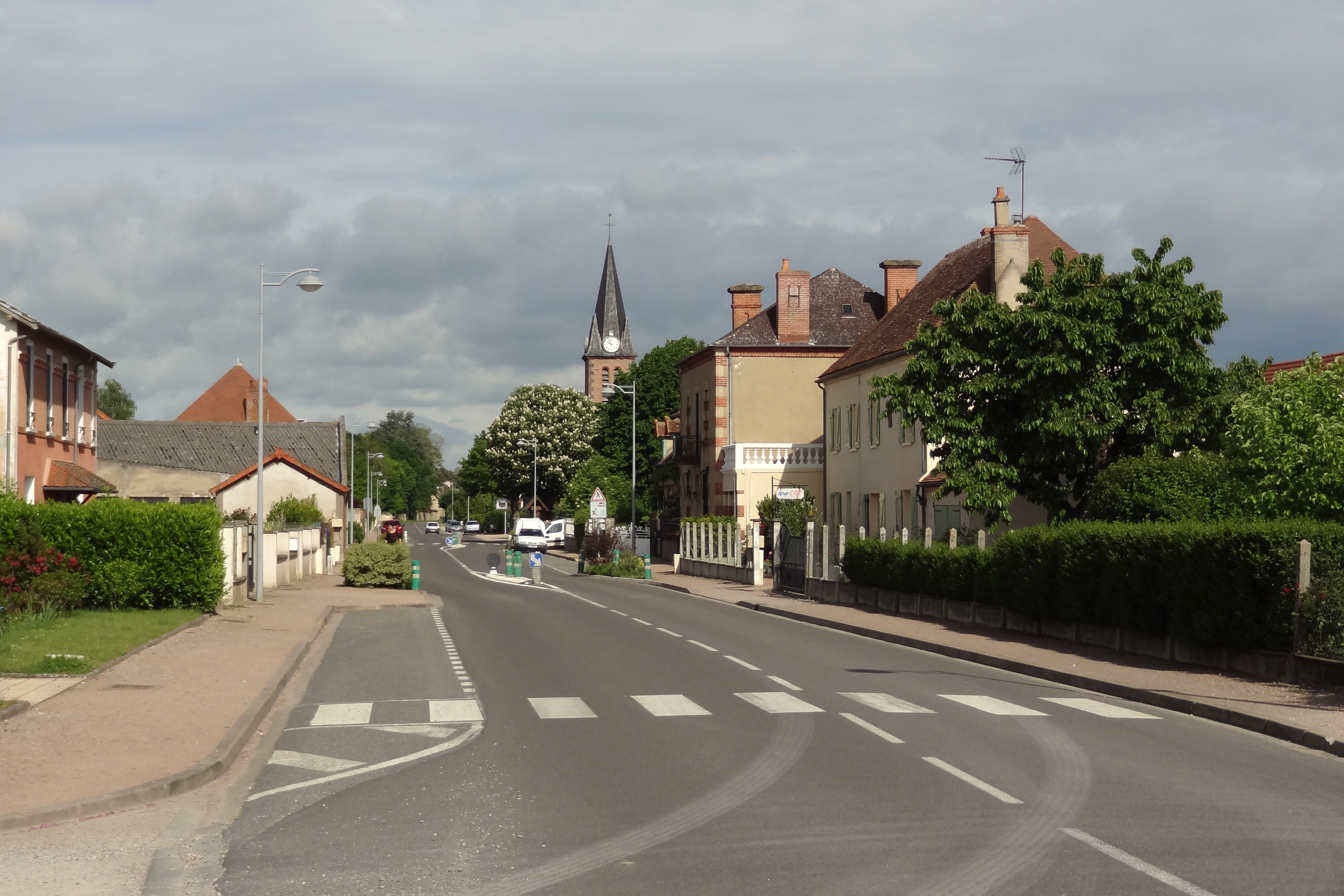
- The main road in La Ferté-Hauterive

- Coat of arms
- Location of La Ferté-Hauterive
- Location within France Location within Auvergne-Rhône-Alpes
- Coordinates: 46°23′51″N 3°20′28″E
- Country: France
- Region: Auvergne-Rhône-Alpes
- Department: Allier
- Arrondissement: Vichy
- Canton: Moulins-2
- Intercommunality: Saint-Pourçain Sioule Limagne

Government
  - Mayor (2026–32): Alain Leblon
- Area^{1}: 18.88 km^{2} (7.29 sq mi)
- Elevation: 234 m (768 ft)
- Highest elevation: 239 m (784 ft)
- Lowest elevation: 214 m (702 ft)
- Population (2023): 254
  - Density: 13.5/km^{2} (34.8/sq mi)
- Time zone: UTC+01:00 (CET)
  - Summer (DST): UTC+02:00 (CEST)
- INSEE/Postal code: 03114 /03340
- ^{1} French Land Register data, which excludes lakes, ponds, glaciers > 1 km^{2} (0.386 sq mi or 247 acres) and river estuaries.

La Ferté-Hauterive (French pronunciation: [la fɛʁte otʁiv]) is a commune in the Allier department in central France.

== Climate ==
On average, La Ferté-Hauterive experiences 70.3 days per year with a minimum temperature below 0 °C (32.0 °F), 2.2 days per year with a minimum temperature below −10 °C (14.0 °F), 5.8 days per year with a maximum temperature below 0 °C (32.0 °F), and 24.6 days per year with a maximum temperature above 30 °C (86.0 °F). The record high temperature was 42.0 °C (107.6 °F) on 27 June 2026, while the record low temperature was −15.8 °C (3.6 °F) on January 31, 2010.

Climate data for La Ferté-Hauterive (1981–2010 normals, extremes 1995–2022)
Month	Jan	Feb	Mar	Apr	May	Jun	Jul	Aug	Sep	Oct	Nov	Dec	Year
Record high °C (°F)	17.8 (64.0)	23.4 (74.1)	26.3 (79.3)	29.7 (85.5)	33.1 (91.6)	42.0 (107.6)	40.8 (105.4)	41.6 (106.9)	36.2 (97.2)	30.9 (87.6)	23.1 (73.6)	18.6 (65.5)	42.0 (107.6)
Mean daily maximum °C (°F)	7.4 (45.3)	9.2 (48.6)	13.4 (56.1)	16.9 (62.4)	21.3 (70.3)	25.2 (77.4)	27.0 (80.6)	27.0 (80.6)	22.6 (72.7)	18.4 (65.1)	11.2 (52.2)	7.2 (45.0)	17.2 (63.0)
Daily mean °C (°F)	3.6 (38.5)	4.8 (40.6)	7.8 (46.0)	10.8 (51.4)	15.2 (59.4)	18.5 (65.3)	20.2 (68.4)	20.0 (68.0)	15.8 (60.4)	12.6 (54.7)	6.8 (44.2)	3.6 (38.5)	11.6 (53.0)
Mean daily minimum °C (°F)	−0.2 (31.6)	0.5 (32.9)	2.2 (36.0)	4.7 (40.5)	9.1 (48.4)	11.9 (53.4)	13.4 (56.1)	13.0 (55.4)	9.0 (48.2)	6.9 (44.4)	2.5 (36.5)	0.1 (32.2)	6.1 (43.0)
Record low °C (°F)	−15.8 (3.6)	−13.8 (7.2)	−11.6 (11.1)	−7.6 (18.3)	−0.9 (30.4)	3.4 (38.1)	4.6 (40.3)	2.5 (36.5)	0.0 (32.0)	−9.8 (14.4)	−11.5 (11.3)	−15.0 (5.0)	−15.8 (3.6)
Average precipitation mm (inches)	44.5 (1.75)	39.5 (1.56)	42.5 (1.67)	60.0 (2.36)	88.9 (3.50)	69.4 (2.73)	60.5 (2.38)	71.4 (2.81)	70.2 (2.76)	61.9 (2.44)	60.5 (2.38)	55.0 (2.17)	724.3 (28.51)
Average precipitation days (≥ 1.0 mm)	10.5	8.4	8.9	9.9	12.0	9.0	7.6	7.7	8.7	10.1	10.6	10.2	113.6
Source: Meteociel

== Population ==
Historical population
Year	Pop.	±% p.a.
1968	415	—
1975	338	−2.89%
1982	355	+0.70%
1990	273	−3.23%
1999	285	+0.48%
2007	267	−0.81%
2012	290	+1.67%
2017	296	+0.41%
2023	254	−2.52%
Source: INSEE

== See also ==
- Communes of the Allier department
