= Mercy, Allier =

Mercy
- Commune
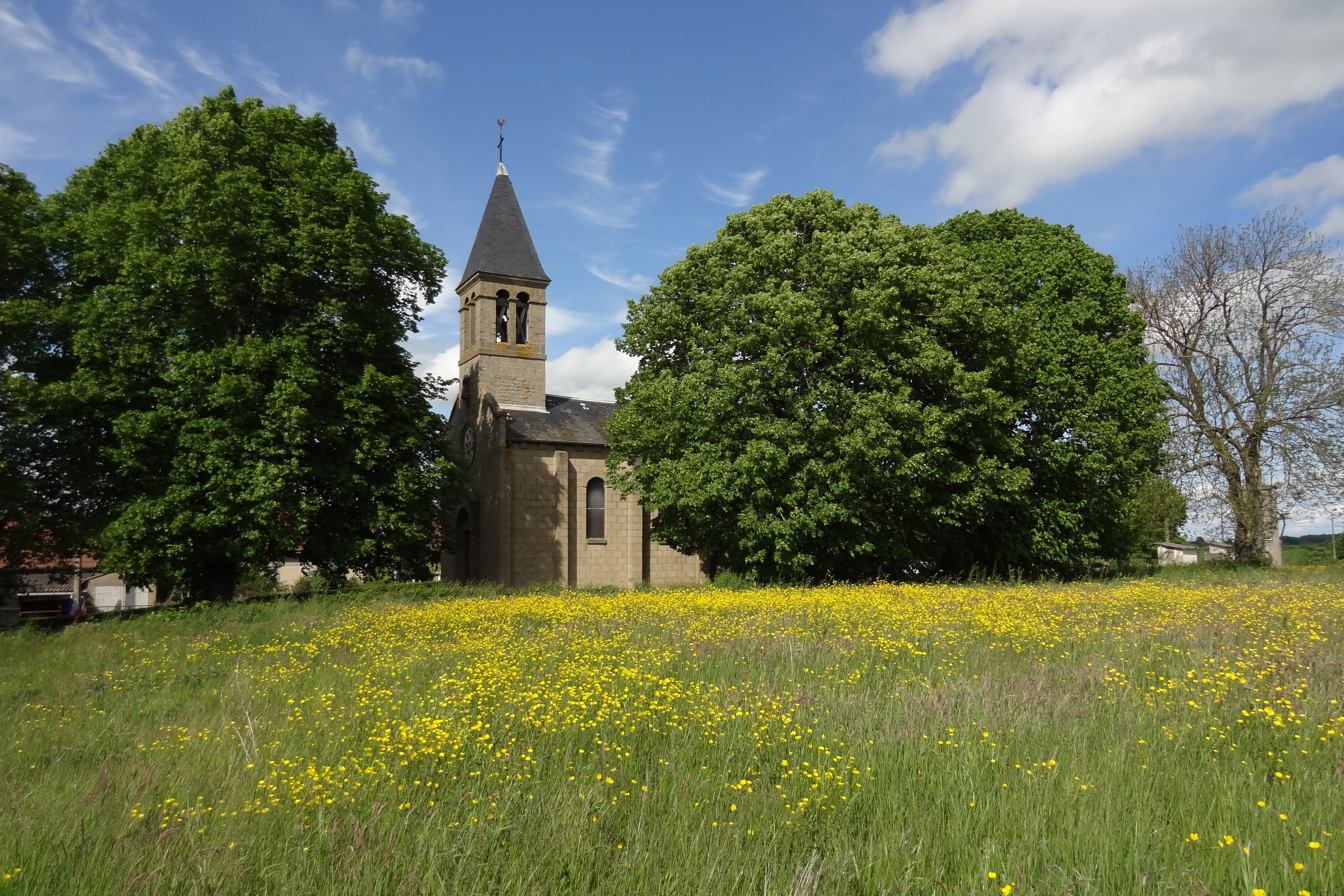
- The church in Mercy
- Location of Mercy
- Location within France Location within Auvergne-Rhône-Alpes
- Coordinates: 46°27′44″N 3°31′02″E
- Country: France
- Region: Auvergne-Rhône-Alpes
- Department: Allier
- Arrondissement: Vichy
- Canton: Moulins-2
- Intercommunality: Entr'Allier Besbre et Loire

Government
  - Mayor (2026–32): Mickaël Perrod
- Area^{1}: 28.8 km^{2} (11.1 sq mi)
- Elevation: 299 m (981 ft)
- Highest elevation: 297 m (974 ft)
- Lowest elevation: 257 m (843 ft)
- Population (2023): 244
  - Density: 8.47/km^{2} (21.9/sq mi)
- Time zone: UTC+01:00 (CET)
  - Summer (DST): UTC+02:00 (CEST)
- INSEE/Postal code: 03171 /03340
- ^{1} French Land Register data, which excludes lakes, ponds, glaciers > 1 km^{2} (0.386 sq mi or 247 acres) and river estuaries.

Mercy (French pronunciation: [mɛʁsi]) is a commune in the Allier department in central France.

== Population ==
Historical population
Year	Pop.	±% p.a.
1968	427	—
1975	383	−1.54%
1982	378	−0.19%
1990	350	−0.96%
1999	293	−1.96%
2007	292	−0.04%
2012	257	−2.52%
2017	261	+0.31%
2023	244	−1.12%
Source: INSEE

== See also ==
- Communes of the Allier department
