= Liernolles =

- Commune
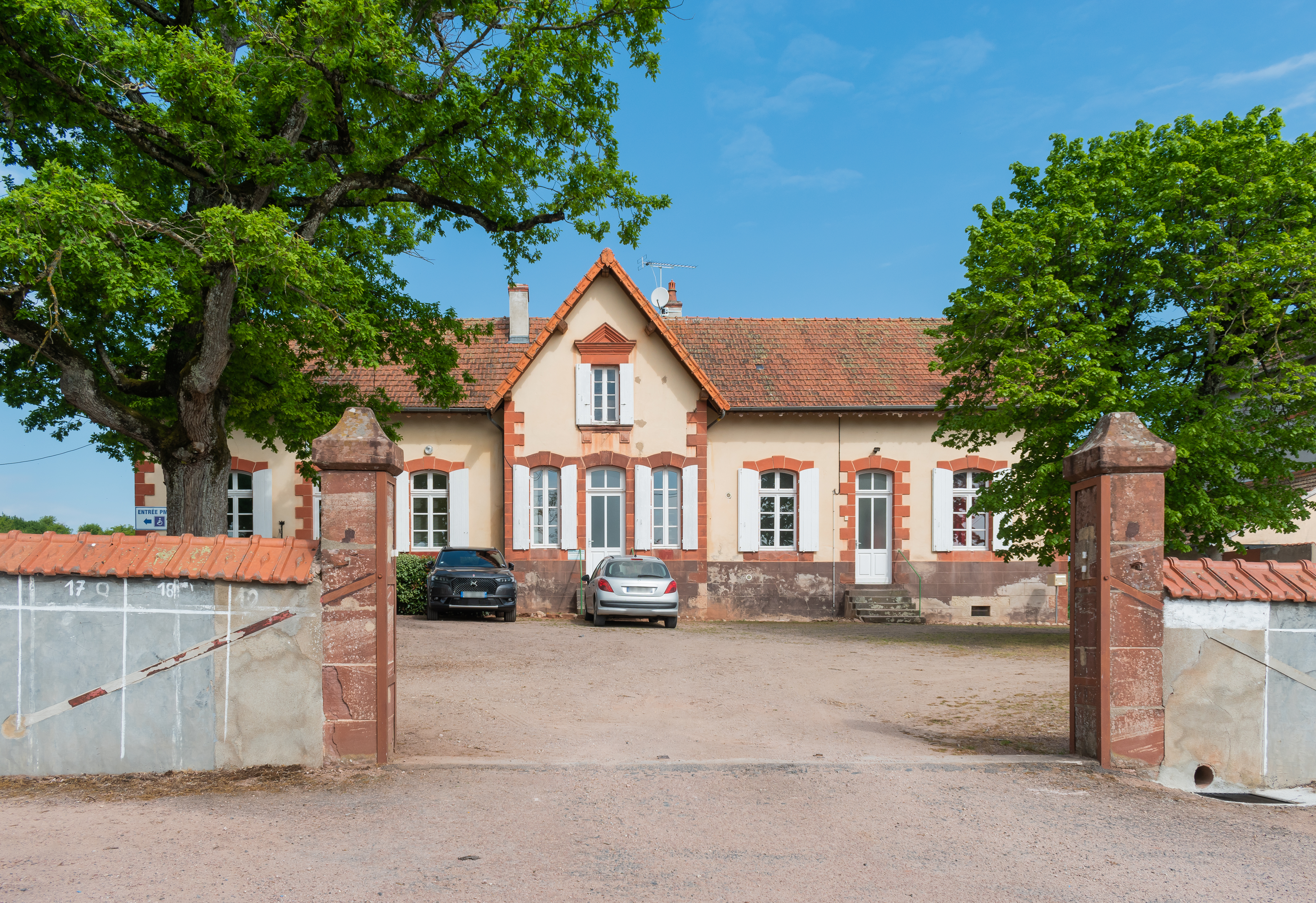
- Town hall of Liernolles
- Location of Liernolles
- Location within France Location within Auvergne-Rhône-Alpes
- Coordinates: 46°23′44″N 3°45′09″E
- Country: France
- Region: Auvergne-Rhône-Alpes
- Department: Allier
- Arrondissement: Vichy
- Canton: Moulins-2
- Intercommunality: Entr'Allier Besbre et Loire

Government
  - Mayor (2026–32): Chantal Proboeuf
- Area^{1}: 37.31 km^{2} (14.41 sq mi)
- Elevation: 245 m (804 ft)
- Highest elevation: 340 m (1,120 ft)
- Lowest elevation: 247 m (810 ft)
- Population (2023): 193
  - Density: 5.17/km^{2} (13.4/sq mi)
- Time zone: UTC+01:00 (CET)
  - Summer (DST): UTC+02:00 (CEST)
- INSEE/Postal code: 03144 /03130
- ^{1} French Land Register data, which excludes lakes, ponds, glaciers > 1 km^{2} (0.386 sq mi or 247 acres) and river estuaries.

Liernolles (French pronunciation: [ljɛʁnɔl]) is a commune in the Allier department in central France.

== Population ==
Historical population
Year	Pop.	±% p.a.
1968	507	—
1975	416	−2.79%
1982	367	−1.77%
1990	309	−2.13%
1999	282	−1.01%
2007	255	−1.25%
2012	215	−3.35%
2017	213	−0.19%
2023	193	−1.63%
Source: INSEE

== See also ==
- Communes of the Allier department
