= Toulon-sur-Allier =

- Commune
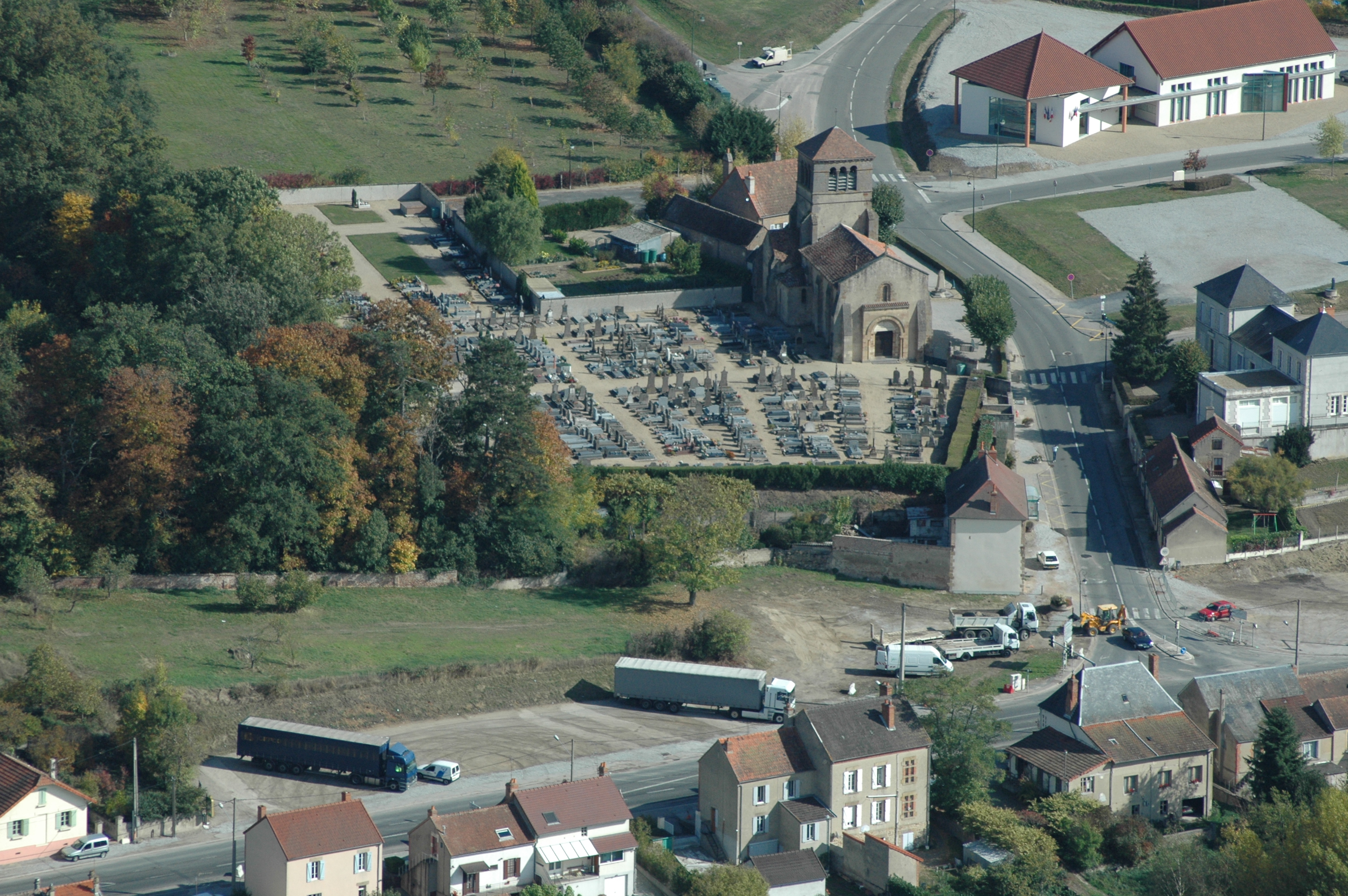
- An aerial view of the church and surroundings
- Location of Toulon-sur-Allier
- Location within France Location within Auvergne-Rhône-Alpes
- Coordinates: 46°31′07″N 3°21′36″E
- Country: France
- Region: Auvergne-Rhône-Alpes
- Department: Allier
- Arrondissement: Moulins
- Canton: Moulins-2
- Intercommunality: CA Moulins Communauté

Government
  - Mayor (2026–32): Guillaume Margelidon
- Area^{1}: 38.69 km^{2} (14.94 sq mi)
- Elevation: 220 m (720 ft)
- Highest elevation: 284 m (932 ft)
- Lowest elevation: 206 m (676 ft)
- Population (2023): 1,166
  - Density: 30.14/km^{2} (78.05/sq mi)
- Time zone: UTC+01:00 (CET)
  - Summer (DST): UTC+02:00 (CEST)
- INSEE/Postal code: 03286 /03400
- ^{1} French Land Register data, which excludes lakes, ponds, glaciers > 1 km^{2} (0.386 sq mi or 247 acres) and river estuaries.

Toulon-sur-Allier (French pronunciation: [tulɔ̃ syʁ alje]) is a commune in the Allier department in Auvergne-Rhône-Alpes in central France.

== Population ==
Historical population
Year	Pop.	±% p.a.
1968	694	—
1975	661	−0.69%
1982	1,112	+7.71%
1990	1,115	+0.03%
1999	1,080	−0.35%
2007	1,098	+0.21%
2012	1,143	+0.81%
2017	1,135	−0.14%
2023	1,166	+0.45%
Source: INSEE

== See also ==
- Moulins - Montbeugny Airport
- Communes of the Allier department
