= Canton of Moulins-2 =

Coordinates: 46.54°N 3.34°E

- Canton
- Situation of the canton of Moulins-2 in the department of Allier
- Country: France
- Region: Auvergne-Rhône-Alpes
- Department: Allier
- No. of communes: {{{nbcomm}}}
- Population (2023): 19,139
- INSEE code: 0314

The canton of Moulins-2 is an administrative division of the Allier department, in central France. It was created at the French canton reorganisation which came into effect in March 2015. Its seat is in Moulins.

It consists of the following communes:

1. Bert
2. Bessay-sur-Allier
3. Chapeau
4. Châtelperron
5. Chavroches
6. Cindré
7. La Ferté-Hauterive
8. Gouise
9. Jaligny-sur-Besbre
10. Liernolles
11. Mercy
12. Montbeugny
13. Moulins (partly)
14. Neuilly-le-Réal
15. Saint-Gérand-de-Vaux
16. Saint-Léon
17. Saint-Voir
18. Sorbier
19. Thionne
20. Toulon-sur-Allier
21. Treteau
22. Trézelles
23. Varennes-sur-Tèche
