= Saint-Gérand-de-Vaux =

- Commune
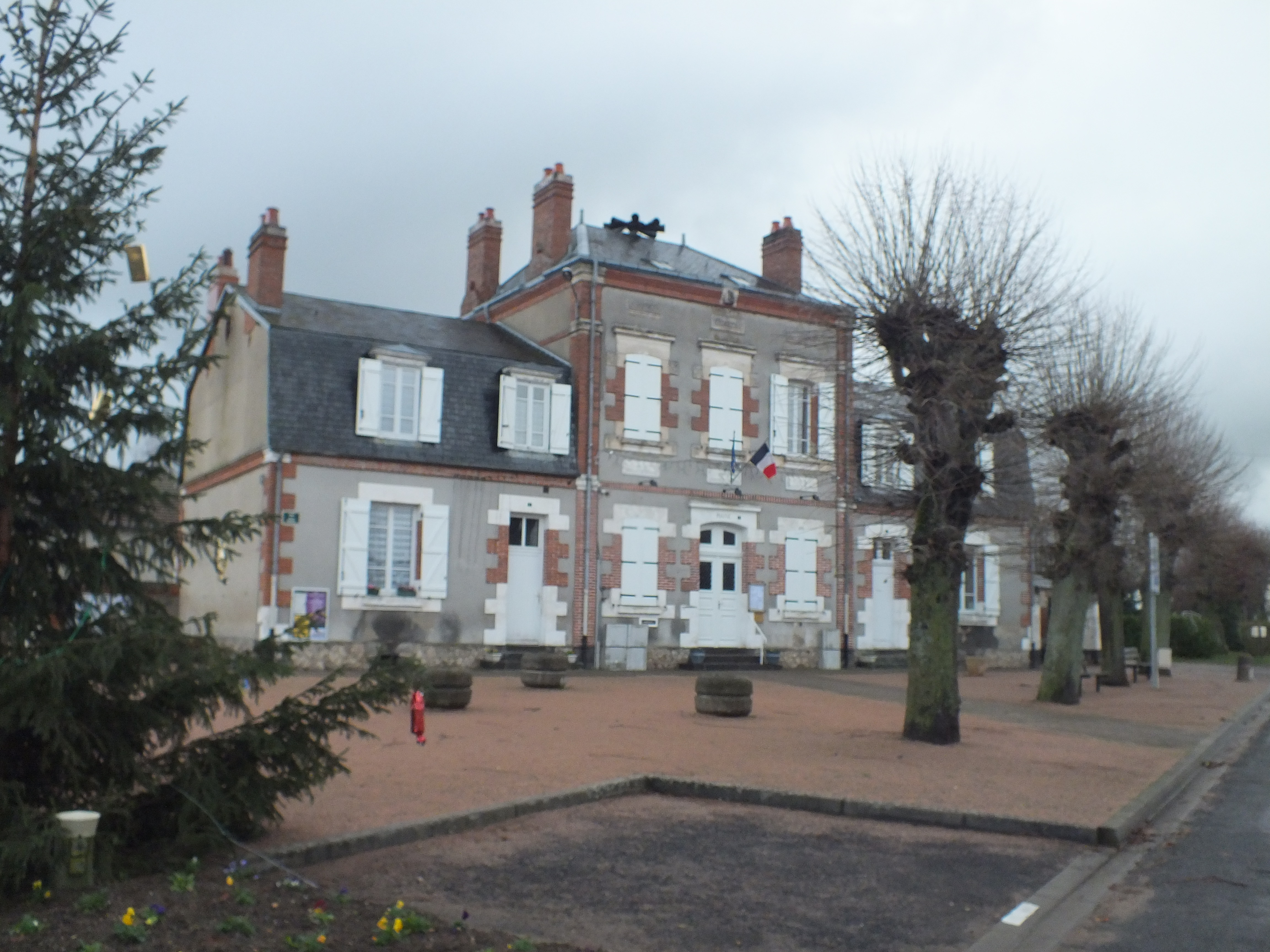
- The town hall in Saint-Gérand-de-Vaux

- Coat of arms
- Location of Saint-Gérand-de-Vaux
- Location within France Location within Auvergne-Rhône-Alpes
- Coordinates: 46°22′52″N 3°23′59″E
- Country: France
- Region: Auvergne-Rhône-Alpes
- Department: Allier
- Arrondissement: Vichy
- Canton: Moulins-2

Government
  - Mayor (2026–32): Daniel Daumur
- Area^{1}: 40.08 km^{2} (15.47 sq mi)
- Elevation: 272 m (892 ft)
- Highest elevation: 304 m (997 ft)
- Lowest elevation: 223 m (732 ft)
- Population (2023): 408
  - Density: 10.2/km^{2} (26.4/sq mi)
- Time zone: UTC+01:00 (CET)
  - Summer (DST): UTC+02:00 (CEST)
- INSEE/Postal code: 03234 /03340
- ^{1} French Land Register data, which excludes lakes, ponds, glaciers > 1 km^{2} (0.386 sq mi or 247 acres) and river estuaries.

Saint-Gérand-de-Vaux (French pronunciation: [sɛ̃ ʒeʁɑ̃ də vo]) is a commune in the Allier department in Auvergne-Rhône-Alpes in central France.

== Population ==
Historical population
Year	Pop.	±% p.a.
1968	641	—
1975	504	−3.38%
1982	506	+0.06%
1990	506	+0.00%
1999	465	−0.93%
2007	442	−0.63%
2012	402	−1.88%
2017	381	−1.07%
2023	408	+1.15%
Source: INSEE

== See also ==
- Communes of the Allier department
