= Saint-Voir =

- Commune
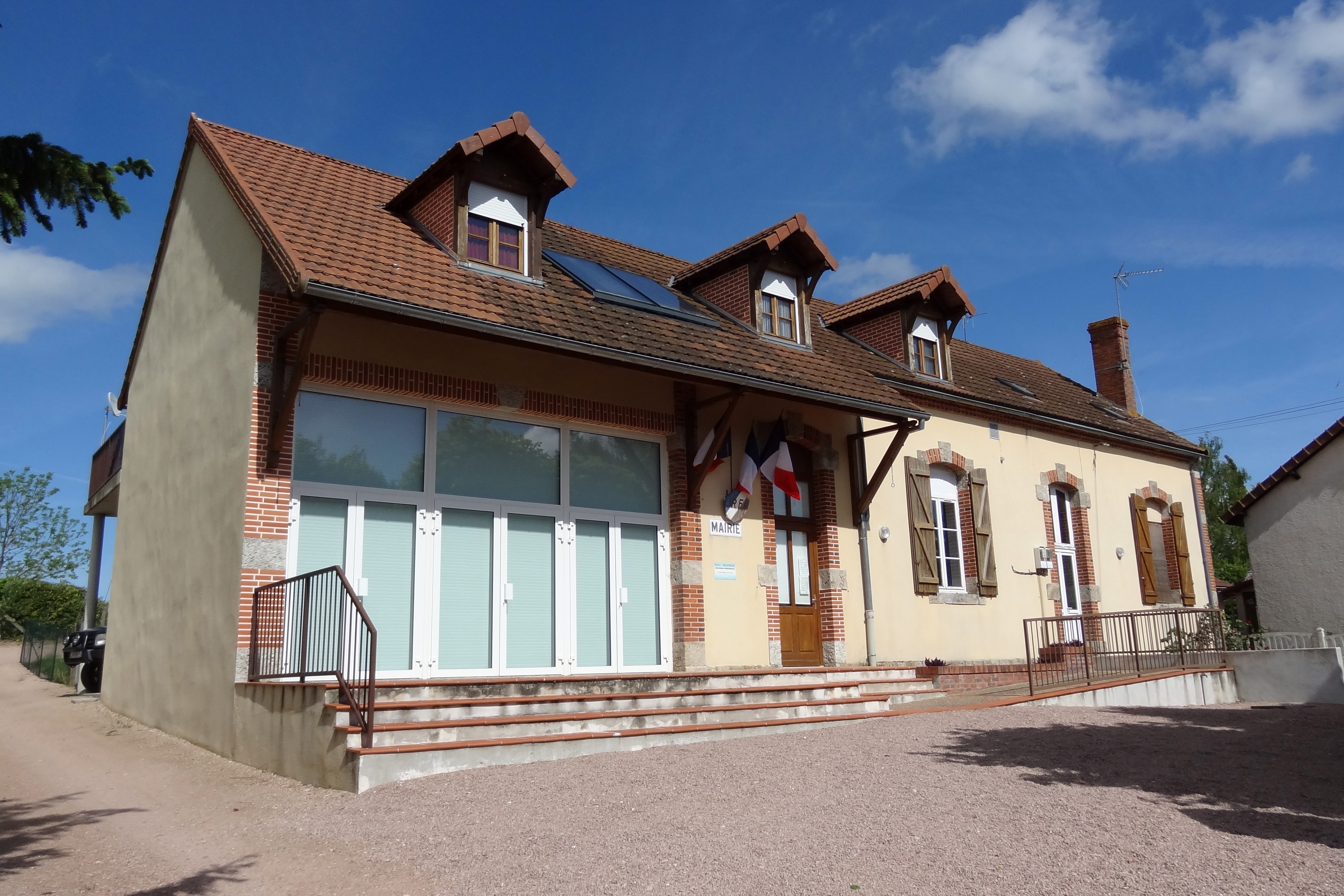
- The town hall in Saint-Voir
- Location of Saint-Voir
- Location within France Location within Auvergne-Rhône-Alpes
- Coordinates: 46°24′26″N 3°31′14″E
- Country: France
- Region: Auvergne-Rhône-Alpes
- Department: Allier
- Arrondissement: Vichy
- Canton: Moulins-2

Government
  - Mayor (2026–32): Jean-Luc Collin
- Area^{1}: 25.12 km^{2} (9.70 sq mi)
- Elevation: 287 m (942 ft)
- Highest elevation: 308 m (1,010 ft)
- Lowest elevation: 247 m (810 ft)
- Population (2023): 201
  - Density: 8.00/km^{2} (20.7/sq mi)
- Time zone: UTC+01:00 (CET)
  - Summer (DST): UTC+02:00 (CEST)
- INSEE/Postal code: 03263 /03220
- ^{1} French Land Register data, which excludes lakes, ponds, glaciers > 1 km^{2} (0.386 sq mi or 247 acres) and river estuaries.

Saint-Voir (French pronunciation: [sɛ̃ vwaʁ]) is a commune in the Allier department in Auvergne-Rhône-Alpes in central France.

== Population ==
Historical population
Year	Pop.	±% p.a.
1968	294	—
1975	240	−2.86%
1982	234	−0.36%
1990	196	−2.19%
1999	200	+0.22%
2007	199	−0.06%
2012	197	−0.20%
2017	190	−0.72%
2023	201	+0.94%
Source: INSEE

== See also ==
- Communes of the Allier department
