= Sologny =

- Commune
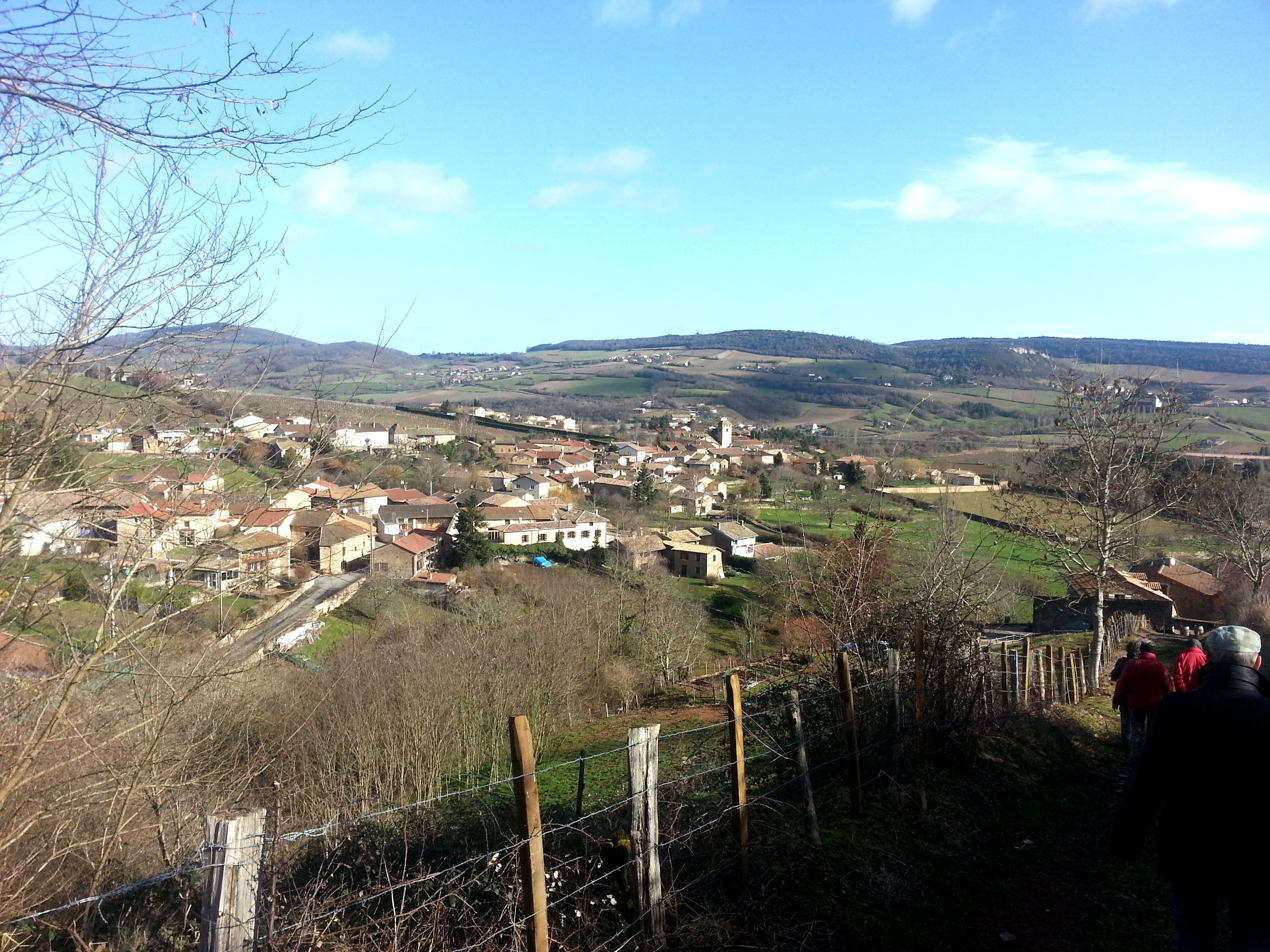
- A general view of Sologny

- Coat of arms
- Location of Sologny
- Location within France Location within Bourgogne-Franche-Comté
- Coordinates: 46°21′36″N 4°40′57″E
- Country: France
- Region: Bourgogne-Franche-Comté
- Department: Saône-et-Loire
- Arrondissement: Mâcon
- Canton: Hurigny
- Intercommunality: Mâconnais Beaujolais Agglomération
- Area^{1}: 10.65 km^{2} (4.11 sq mi)
- Elevation: 272 m (892 ft)
- Highest elevation: 602 m (1,975 ft)
- Lowest elevation: 260 m (850 ft)
- Population (2023): 572
  - Density: 53.7/km^{2} (139/sq mi)
- Time zone: UTC+01:00 (CET)
  - Summer (DST): UTC+02:00 (CEST)
- INSEE/Postal code: 71525 /71960
- ^{1} French Land Register data, which excludes lakes, ponds, glaciers > 1 km^{2} (0.386 sq mi or 247 acres) and river estuaries.

Sologny (French pronunciation: [sɔlɔɲi]; Arpitan: Selognié) is a commune in the Saône-et-Loire department in the region of Bourgogne-Franche-Comté in eastern France.

== See also ==
- Communes of the Saône-et-Loire department
