= Chapeau, Allier =

Chapeau
- Commune
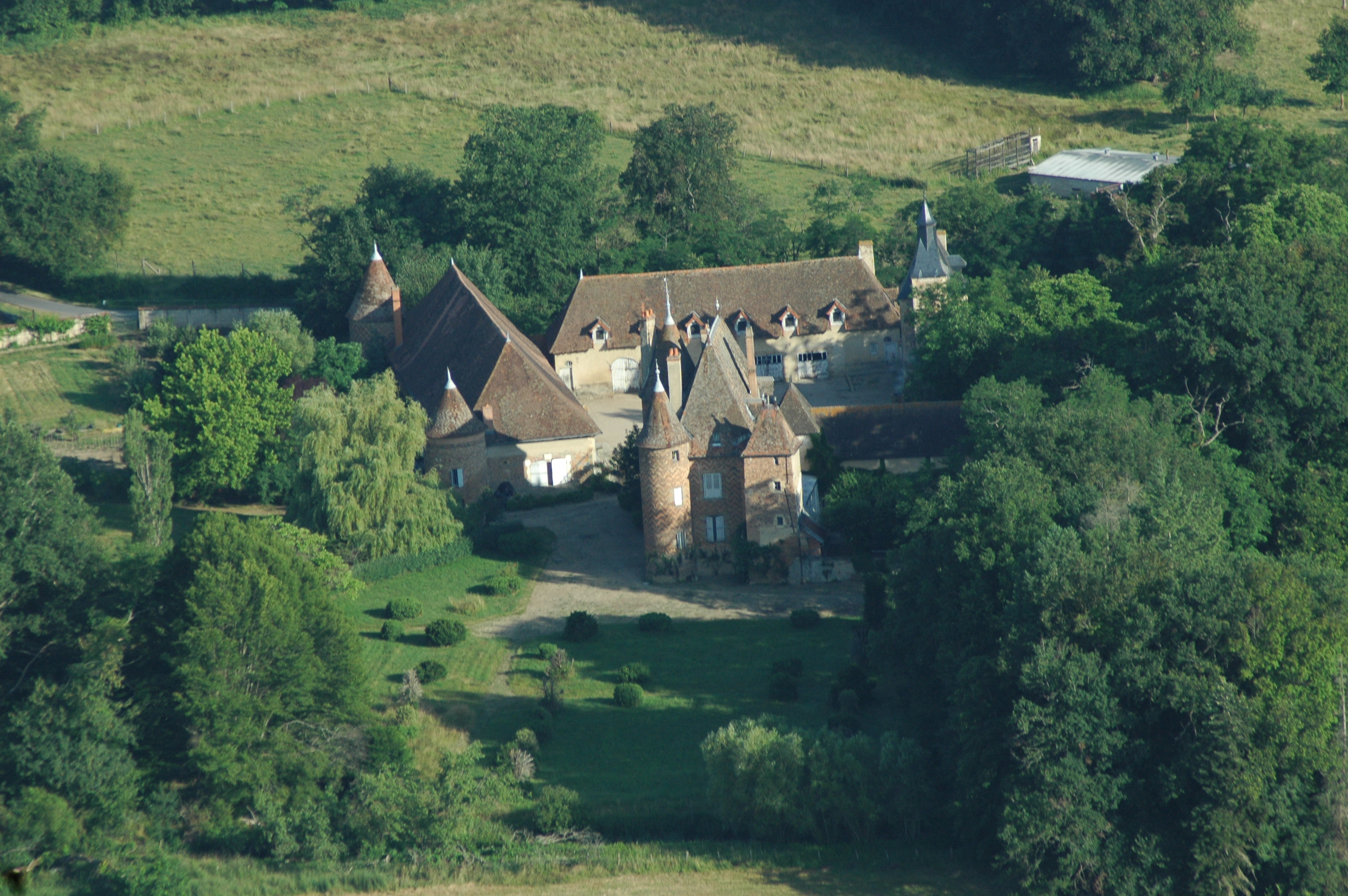
- Castle
- Location of Chapeau
- Location within France Location within Auvergne-Rhône-Alpes
- Coordinates: 46°29′19″N 3°31′26″E
- Country: France
- Region: Auvergne-Rhône-Alpes
- Department: Allier
- Arrondissement: Moulins
- Canton: Moulins-2
- Intercommunality: CA Moulins Communauté

Government
  - Mayor (2026–32): Béatrice Ramette
- Area^{1}: 33.42 km^{2} (12.90 sq mi)
- Elevation: 256 m (840 ft)
- Highest elevation: 285 m (935 ft)
- Lowest elevation: 239 m (784 ft)
- Population (2023): 231
  - Density: 6.91/km^{2} (17.9/sq mi)
- Time zone: UTC+01:00 (CET)
  - Summer (DST): UTC+02:00 (CEST)
- INSEE/Postal code: 03054 /03340
- ^{1} French Land Register data, which excludes lakes, ponds, glaciers > 1 km^{2} (0.386 sq mi or 247 acres) and river estuaries.

Chapeau (French pronunciation: [ʃapo]) is a commune in the Allier department in central France.

== Population ==
Historical population
Year	Pop.	±% p.a.
1968	329	—
1975	295	−1.55%
1982	300	+0.24%
1990	264	−1.59%
1999	216	−2.21%
2007	221	+0.29%
2012	227	+0.54%
2017	232	+0.44%
2023	231	−0.07%
Source: INSEE

== See also ==
- Communes of the Allier department
