= Bessay-sur-Allier =

- Commune
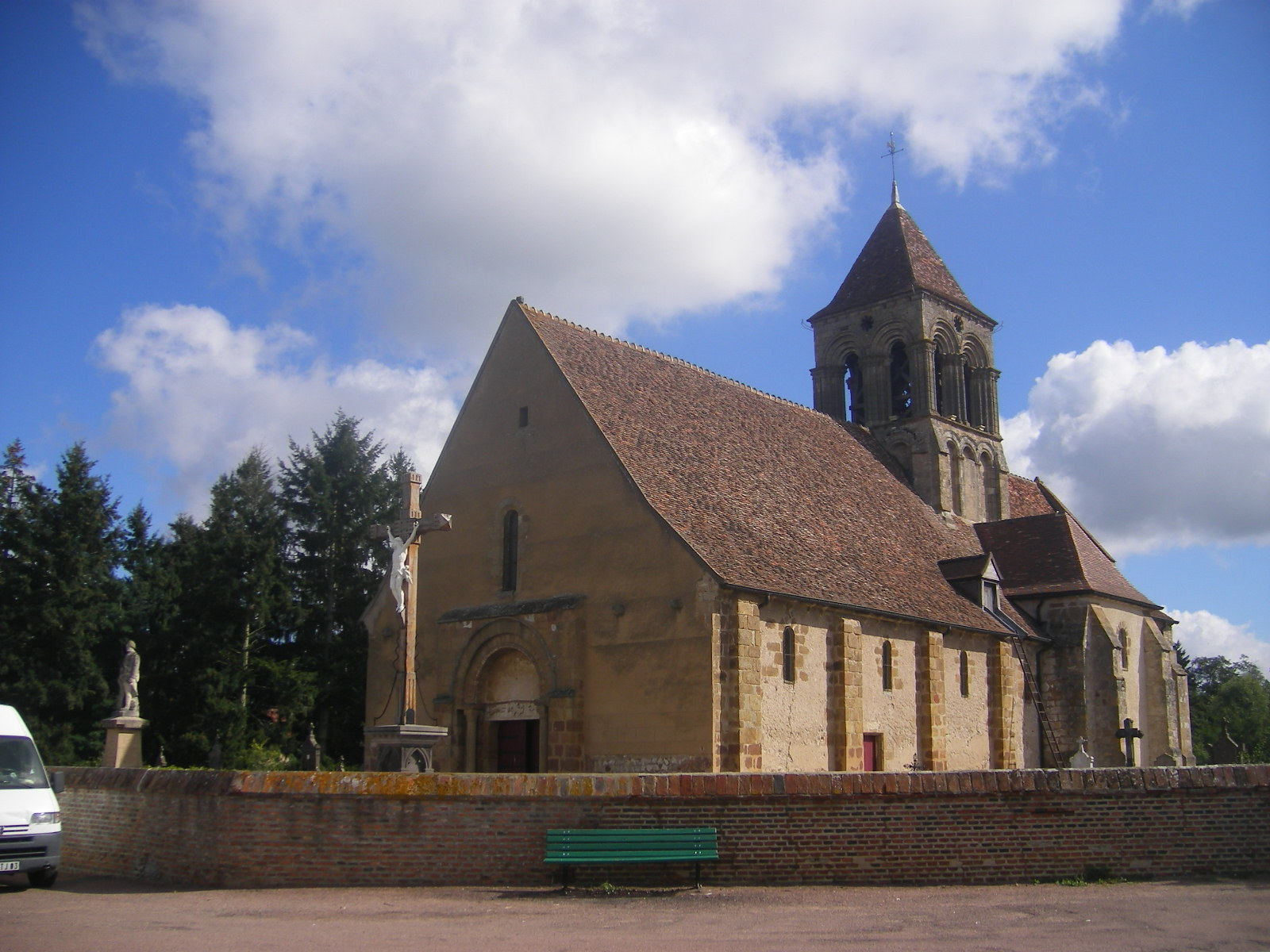
- The church in Bessay-sur-Allier

- Coat of arms
- Location of Bessay-sur-Allier
- Location within France Location within Auvergne-Rhône-Alpes
- Coordinates: 46°26′34″N 3°21′48″E
- Country: France
- Region: Auvergne-Rhône-Alpes
- Department: Allier
- Arrondissement: Moulins
- Canton: Moulins-2
- Intercommunality: CA Moulins Communauté

Government
  - Mayor (2026–32): Didier Paqueriaud
- Area^{1}: 34.6 km^{2} (13.4 sq mi)
- Elevation: 220 m (720 ft)
- Highest elevation: 271 m (889 ft)
- Lowest elevation: 209 m (686 ft)
- Population (2023): 1,382
  - Density: 39.9/km^{2} (103/sq mi)
- Time zone: UTC+01:00 (CET)
  - Summer (DST): UTC+02:00 (CEST)
- INSEE/Postal code: 03025 /03340
- Website: mairie-bessay-sur-allier.fr
- ^{1} French Land Register data, which excludes lakes, ponds, glaciers > 1 km^{2} (0.386 sq mi or 247 acres) and river estuaries.

Bessay-sur-Allier (French pronunciation: [bɛsɛ syʁ alje], literally Bessay on Allier) is a commune in the Allier department in central France.

== Population ==
Historical population
Year	Pop.	±% p.a.
1968	1,207	—
1975	1,157	−0.60%
1982	1,331	+2.02%
1990	1,329	−0.02%
1999	1,378	+0.40%
2007	1,417	+0.35%
2012	1,390	−0.38%
2017	1,335	−0.80%
2023	1,382	+0.58%
Source: INSEE

== Administration ==
The current mayor is Didier Paqueriaud, elected in 2020.

== See also ==
- Communes of the Allier department
