= Neuilly-le-Réal =

- Commune
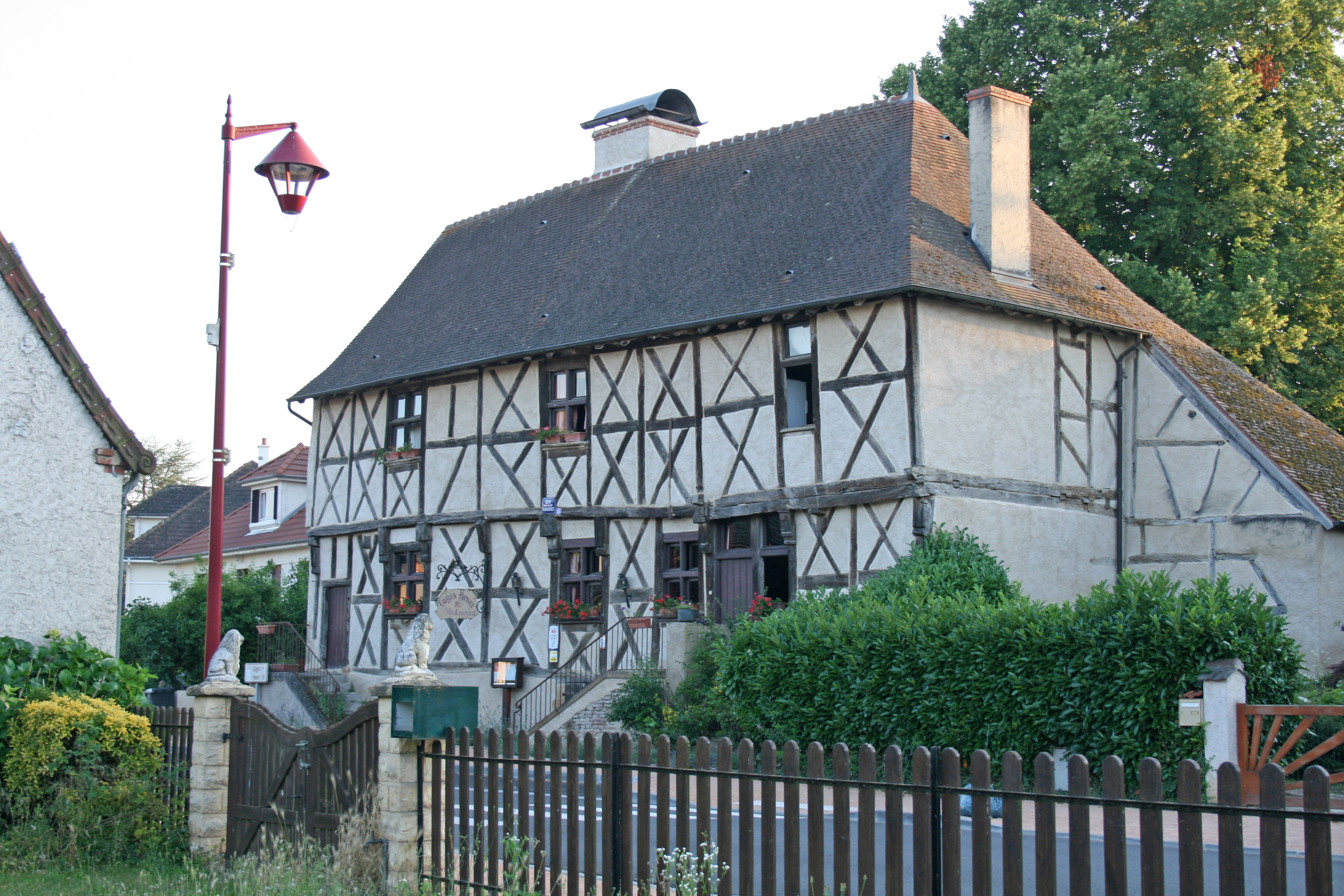
- Logis d'Henri IV in Neuilly-le-Réal

- Coat of arms
- Location of Neuilly-le-Réal
- Location within France Location within Auvergne-Rhône-Alpes
- Coordinates: 46°27′54″N 3°25′57″E
- Country: France
- Region: Auvergne-Rhône-Alpes
- Department: Allier
- Arrondissement: Moulins
- Canton: Moulins-2
- Intercommunality: CA Moulins Communauté

Government
  - Mayor (2026–32): Hervé Baudoin
- Area^{1}: 46.97 km^{2} (18.14 sq mi)
- Elevation: 260 m (850 ft)
- Highest elevation: 293 m (961 ft)
- Lowest elevation: 227 m (745 ft)
- Population (2023): 1,435
  - Density: 30.55/km^{2} (79.13/sq mi)
- Time zone: UTC+01:00 (CET)
  - Summer (DST): UTC+02:00 (CEST)
- INSEE/Postal code: 03197 /03340
- ^{1} French Land Register data, which excludes lakes, ponds, glaciers > 1 km^{2} (0.386 sq mi or 247 acres) and river estuaries.

Neuilly-le-Réal (French pronunciation: [nœji lə ʁeal]) is a commune in the Allier department in Auvergne-Rhône-Alpes in central France.

== Population ==
Historical population
Year	Pop.	±% p.a.
1968	1,205	—
1975	1,084	−1.50%
1982	1,201	+1.48%
1990	1,287	+0.87%
1999	1,303	+0.14%
2007	1,351	+0.45%
2012	1,450	+1.42%
2017	1,456	+0.08%
2023	1,435	−0.24%
Source: INSEE

== Culture and Heritage ==
- Logis of Henri IV, 16th century.
- Lazarist Farmer General's House, 18th century.
- Church Saint-Julien de Brioude.
- Castle of Frêne (or Fresne), 17th and 19th centuries; Monument Historique since 1 October 2021.

== See also ==
- Communes of the Allier department
