= Montbeugny =

- Commune
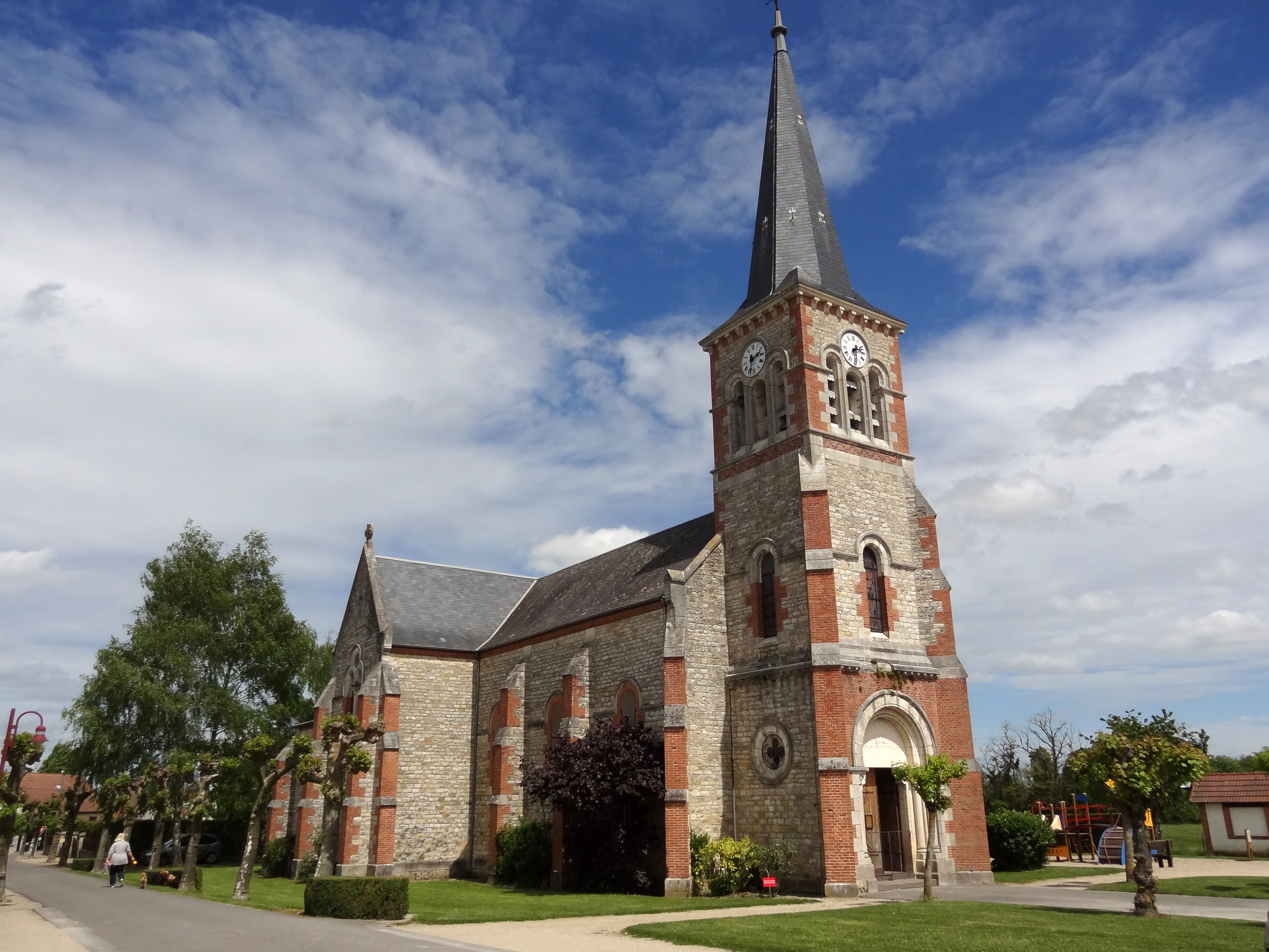
- The church in Montbeugny
- Location of Montbeugny
- Location within France Location within Auvergne-Rhône-Alpes
- Coordinates: 46°31′47″N 3°29′23″E
- Country: France
- Region: Auvergne-Rhône-Alpes
- Department: Allier
- Arrondissement: Moulins
- Canton: Moulins-2
- Intercommunality: CA Moulins Communauté

Government
  - Mayor (2026–32): Guy Charmetant
- Area^{1}: 32.65 km^{2} (12.61 sq mi)
- Elevation: 274 m (899 ft)
- Highest elevation: 287 m (942 ft)
- Lowest elevation: 238 m (781 ft)
- Population (2023): 638
  - Density: 19.5/km^{2} (50.6/sq mi)
- Time zone: UTC+01:00 (CET)
  - Summer (DST): UTC+02:00 (CEST)
- INSEE/Postal code: 03180 /03340
- ^{1} French Land Register data, which excludes lakes, ponds, glaciers > 1 km^{2} (0.386 sq mi or 247 acres) and river estuaries.

Montbeugny (French pronunciation: [mɔ̃bøɲi]) is a commune in the Allier department in central France.

== Population ==
Historical population
Year	Pop.	±% p.a.
1968	505	—
1975	457	−1.42%
1982	421	−1.17%
1990	557	+3.56%
1999	552	−0.10%
2007	616	+1.38%
2012	689	+2.27%
2017	681	−0.23%
2023	638	−1.08%
Source: INSEE

== See also ==
- Communes of the Allier department
