= Marcenat =

Marcenat may refer to the following places in France:

- Marcenat, Allier, a commune in the department of Allier
- Marcenat, Cantal, a commune in the department of Cantal
