= Paray-sous-Briailles =

- Commune
- Coat of arms
- Location of Paray-sous-Briailles
- Location within France Location within Auvergne-Rhône-Alpes
- Coordinates: 46°17′28″N 3°21′57″E
- Country: France
- Region: Auvergne-Rhône-Alpes
- Department: Allier
- Arrondissement: Vichy
- Canton: Saint-Pourçain-sur-Sioule

Government
  - Mayor (2026–32): Gilles Journet
- Area^{1}: 22.18 km^{2} (8.56 sq mi)
- Elevation: 234 m (768 ft)
- Highest elevation: 266 m (873 ft)
- Lowest elevation: 228 m (748 ft)
- Population (2023): 616
  - Density: 27.8/km^{2} (71.9/sq mi)
- Time zone: UTC+01:00 (CET)
  - Summer (DST): UTC+02:00 (CEST)
- INSEE/Postal code: 03204 /03500
- ^{1} French Land Register data, which excludes lakes, ponds, glaciers > 1 km^{2} (0.386 sq mi or 247 acres) and river estuaries.

Paray-sous-Briailles (French pronunciation: [paʁɛ su bʁijaj]; Occitan: Pareit de Bralhas) is a commune in the French department of Allier in the Auvergne-Rhône-Alpes region; before 2016, it belonged to the Auvergne region. Paray-sous-Briailles is located in the arrondissement (eng. administrative region) of Moulins and the canton of Saint-Pourçain-sur-Sioule.

== Geography ==
Paray-sous-Briailles lies about 35 kilometers south-southeast of Moulins and 23 kilometers north-northwest of Vichy on the Allier river, which borders the municipality from the east. Paray-sous-Briailles is bordered by the municipalities of Saint-Pourçain-sur-Sioule to the north and west, Varennes-sur-Allier to the north and east, Créchy to the southeast, Marcenat to the south, as well as Loriges to the south and southwest.

== Population ==
Its residents are called Parodiens in French.

Historical population
Year	Pop.	±% p.a.
1968	570	—
1975	513	−1.49%
1982	529	+0.44%
1990	495	−0.83%
1999	538	+0.93%
2007	613	+1.64%
2012	647	+1.09%
2017	633	−0.44%
2023	616	−0.45%
Source: INSEE

== See also ==
- Communes of the Allier department

== Places of interest ==
- Church of Saint-Julien from the 12th century
- Castle
- Tower of Villemouze

== Literature ==
Le Patrimoine des Communes de l'Allier. Volume 2. Flohic Editions, Paris 1999, ISBN 2-84234-053-1, p. 958-959.
