= Paray =

Paray may refer to:

== Places ==
- Paray-Douaville, Yvelines department, France
- Paray-le-Frésil, Allier department, France
- Paray-le-Monial, Saône-et-Loire department, France
- Paray-sous-Briailles, Allier department, France
- Paray-Vieille-Poste, Essonne department, France
- Pointe de Paray, mountain of the Swiss Prealps

== People ==
- Paul Paray (1886–1979), French conductor
- Rushton Paray, Trinidad and Tobago politician
