= 2007 European KF1 Championship =

KF1 is the top level of karting.

Round	Circuit	Date	Pole	Winner
1 2	(Italy) Ugento	6 May	(Italy) Marco Ardigò (Italy) Marco Ardigò	(Italy) Marco Ardigò (Italy) Marco Ardigò
3 4	(France) Varennes-sur-Allier	24 June	(France) Alban Varutti (Italy) Marco Ardigò	(Italy) Marco Ardigò (Italy) Marco Ardigò

== See also ==
- European KF1 Championship
