= Boucé =

Boucé may refer to the following places in France:

- Boucé, Allier, a commune in the department of Allier
- Boucé, Orne, a commune in the department of Orne
