= Guy Renne =

French painter

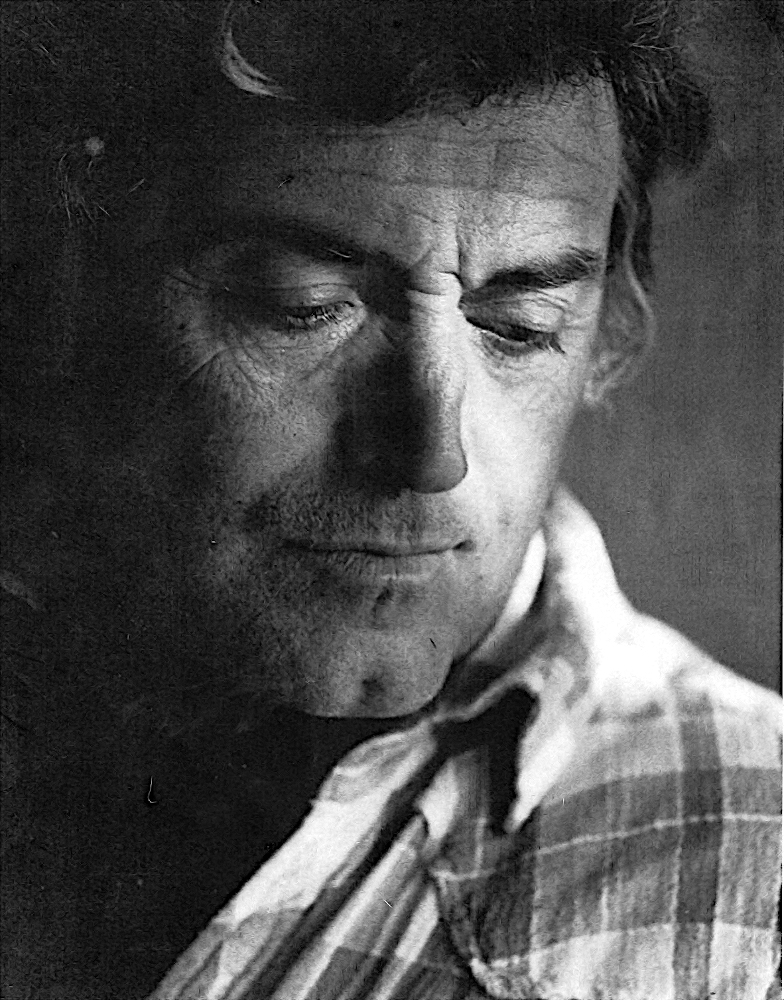
- Guy Renne in the mid-1980s
- Born: 21 October 1925; Moulins (Allier) - France
- Died: 27 June 1990 (aged 64); Montord (Allier) - France
- Notable work: Vénus trigonométriques, Les Baigneuses, Arbres et Pierres
- Memorials: Streets were named after him in Arles and Fontvieille (France)
- Website: http://guyrenne.com

Guy Renne (21 October 1925 in Moulins – 27 June 1990 in Montord) was a French painter, draughtsman, pastellist, engraver, sculptor. He was first a painter from Bourbonnais (Charroux), until his installation in Provence in Fontvieille, then in Arles where he would reside until his death.

== Biography ==
=== Childhood and youth ===
He was born in the Bourbonnais region in center of France in a bourgeois family. His father is a cavalry officer. His mother, cultivated and artist, watches over the intellectual and artistic education of her three children. She very quickly recognized the precocious artistic gifts of her son Guy, whom she strongly encouraged1. He made his first exhibition in Clermont-Ferrand in 1938, when he was only thirteen years old. Shortly after, he discovered with fascination the world of museums, especially the Louvre. Major dazzling, in particular in front of the Corots, Ruysdaël, the School of Barbizon - and Rembrandts.

At the end of the war, in 1944, he made a short stint at the Beaux-Arts in Paris, whose academicism he rejected.

In 1952, he left his native Bourbonnais to settle in Arles then Fontvieille, where he lived until his death; a street bears his name in each of these municipalities.

=== Private life ===
Guy Renne married Thérèse Touchet on November 10, 1952. They have two children: Gilles Renne (1954), guitarist and jazz composer, and Olivier Renne (1960), jazz drummer and painter.

=== Experience ===
==== Landscaper ====
Since his childhood, he has been fascinated and amazed by nature which he will never stop painting, from Bourbonnais until his arrival in Arles. Sketches, oils on paper or canvas mark his discovery of Provence.

==== Abstract Period ====
In the 60s, influenced among other contemporaries by Serge Poliakov and especially Nicolas De Staël, he painted abstract works. It is in particular the period of "Trigonometric Venus". a series of female figures with geometric shapes inspired by Bernard Buffet This evolution towards geometric expression will continue in particular with his Jazz Rhythms series in which he explores the relationship between music and painting.

==== Trees and Stones ====
In 1969, he began to graphically interpret the patterns, drawing trees and landscapes of Provence in the series "Trees and Stones", sketches of the Alpilles then developed in the workshop in large drawings in Indian ink, to feather or reed, sometimes on a light background of printing or colored wash, on the theme of Trees and stones.

==== Les Baigneuses (Bathers) ====
The end of the 1970s saw the emergence of the Baigneuses series, oils on paper organized in horizontal registers, in which voluptuous female silhouettes. Around 1985, the landscapes and silhouettes were reduced to rhythmic volumes.

== Exhibitions ==
=== Individual exhibitions ===
- 1938 - Clermont-Ferrand, Gallery Ondet : 1^{re} exposition Pastels du Bourbonnais.
- 1948 - Paris, Gallery Rey.
- 1951 - Aubusson, Gallery X.
- 1954 - Arles, Gallery La Jansonne.
- 1955 - Haguenau, Museum.
- 1955 - Arles, City Hall.
- 1956 - Berne (Suisse), Theater Workshop.
- 1957 - Berne (Suisse), Theater Workshop.
- 1958 - Zurich (Suisse), Gallery Arta.
- 1964 - Bagnols-sur-Cèze, Cultural Center : Jazz et peinture. Reportage FR3 Marseille.
- 1967 - Umeo (Suède) - Alliance française.
- 1969 - Nîmes, Cultural Center La Sada.
- 1970 - Marseille, Gallery Berthier.
- 1971 - Arles, Gallery Drivet.
- 1972 - Berne (Suisse), Gallery Zähringer.
- 1973 - Arles, City Hall.
- 1974 - Montpellier, Gallery Tessa.
- 1975 - Nancy, Gallery Wingerter.
- 1975 - Aix-en-Provence, Gallery les Maîtres contemporains.
- 1976 - Berne (Suisse), Gallery Zähringer.
- 1976 - Aix-en-Provence, Gallery les Maîtres contemporains.
- 1977 - Arles, Cultural Center Pablo Neruda.
- 1977 - Aix-en-Provence, Gallery les Maîtres contemporains.
- 1978 - Saint-Didier-la-Forêt (Allier), Abbaye Saint-Gilbert de Neuffonts : Les Baigneuses. Reportage FR3 Auvergne.
- 1978 - Berlin (Allemagne), Französisches Institut
- 1979 - Paris, le Bourger Airport.
- 1980 - Périgueux, Gallery Saint-Louis.
- 1980 - Neuchâtel (Suisse), Gallery du Pressoir.
- 1980 - Cavaillon, Chapelle du Grand Couvent.
- 1980 - Paris, Gallery Vienner.
- 1980 - Martigues, Gallery Sordini.
- 1981 - Berne/belp (Suisse), Wöln Gallery.
- 1981 - Lausanne (Suisse), Gallery du Ricochet.
- 1981 - Marseille, Gallery de la Maison portugaise.
- 1981 - Charroux, Museum.
- 1982 - Saint-Rémy-de-Provence, Chapelle des Ursulines.
- 1983 - Martigues, Gallery Sordini.
- 1985 - Nîmes, Gallery L'Atelier.
- 1986 - Saint-Didier-la-Forêt (Allier), Abbaye Saint-Gilbert de Neuffonts.
- 1986 - Autun, Gallery Treize.
- 1987 - Fontvieille, La Gallery.
- 1990 - La Chapelle Biron (Lot-et-Garonne).

=== Collective exhibitions ===
- 1952 - Saint-Rémy-de-Provence, Gallery la Jansonne : Painters of Provence.
- 1953, 1956 - Arles
- 1958 - Zurich (Suisse), Gallery Arta.
- 1974 - Arles, Cultural Center Pablo-Neruda.
- 1975 - Berne (Suisse), Gallery Zähringer.
- 1979 - Arles, Cultural Center Pablo-Neruda.
- 1979 - Montpellier, Cultural Center du Languedoc.
- 1979 - Marseille, Crédit Mutuel.
- 1982 - Aix-en-Provence, Gallery les Maîtres contemporains.
- 1982 - Martigues, Gallery Sordini.
- 1986 - Fontvieille, La Gallery.
- 1989 - Saint-Rémy-de-Provence, Museum of Alpilles : Artist workshop.

=== Trade fairs ===
- 1941 & 1942 - Vichy, Salon du Vernet.
- 1945 - Paris, Salon d'Automne.
- 1972 - Hyères, Salon d'Hyères.
- 1972 - Monaco, Salon de Monaco (Unesco).
- 1972 - Toulon, Salon de Toulon.
- 1973 - Montélimard, Salon de Montélimard.
- 1978 - Berlin (Allemagne), Neuen Kunz.
- 1978 - Arles, Salon des Arts plastiques de Provence (Cultural Center Pablo-Neruda).
- 1979 - Montpellier, Salon des Arts plastiques du Languedoc (Cultural Center).

=== Public Orders ===
- July 1954 - Decorative model for Jean Renoir's "Jules César" in the arenas of Arles, on the occasion of the two-millennium of the founding of the city.
- 1958 - Arles : Chemin de Croix (commandes des Monuments historiques).
- 1962 - Saint-Étienne-du-Grès, école maternelle : Contes pour enfants (peintures murales).
- 1974 - Arles, école Émile-Loubet : L'Enfant, l'homme et la nature (deux peintures murales de 60 m^{2}, variations harmoniques sur rondes d'enfants).
- 1980 - Fontvieille, école : La Bête (sculpture-jeu-monochrome).
- 1980 - Saint-Étienne-du-Grès, groupe scolaire : Les Paravents, (sculpture-jeu béton polychrome).
- 1981 - Raphèle-lès-Arles, école maternelle : Les Poissons (muret-jeu).
- 1983 - Fos-sur-Mer, groupe scolaire : Fos-sur-Mer (grand polychrome relief en 5 parties stylisant l'histoire de la ville de Fos et son évolution : Phéniciens, Romains, Fosses mariennes, Bassins industriels et de plaisance).

=== Private Orders ===
- 1950 - Les Naïades. Premières peintures murales.
- 1962 - Paris, rue des Beaux-Arts : Picking rice (large mural with Vietnamese motifs) - La Route mandarine (sculptures).
- 1963 Paris - Decor and sculptures for the Restaurant "La route Mandarine".
- 1964 - Eygalières, Club de jazz : Rythmes (polychrome relief and iron sculptures).
- 1974 - Zurich (Suisse) : Abstraction rythme (mural).
- 1977 - Fontvieille : Le Minotaure (polychrome relief).
- 1979 - Fontvieille, Hôtel La Peiriero : Baigneuse aquatique (polychrome relief).
- 1985 - Le Crestet (Drôme) : Rythmes.

=== Posthumous life of the work ===
==== Museum ====
- Museum d'Uzès (Gard)
  - Baigneuses, 1977 - oil on paper and India ink, 65 x 51 cm.
  - Le Minotaure, 1963 - Two oils on paper and India ink, 65 x 51 cm and 43 x 26.5 cm (presentation in the André-Gide room, for André Gide's Thésée).
  - Gift of several drawings, paintings on canvas and on paper.
- Museum of Charroux (Allier)
  - 2015 - Room dedicated to Guy Renne's Chinese inks.

==== Exhibitions ====
- 1990 - Fontvieille, La Gallery : « Latest works ».
- 1991 - Arles, Chapelle du Méjean : Baigneuses.
- 1992 - Uzès, Museum :works from 1970 to 1990, lithographs, drawings and oils on paper.
- 1994 - Fontvieille, La Gallery (on the occasion of the baptism of rue Guy-Renne): “Guy Renne et la Provence”.
- 1995 - Arles, Conference room of J. Imbert hospital: paintings and drawings, 1970–1990.
- 1996 - Martigues, Médiathèque : « Paintings and drawings, 1970-1990 ».
- 2005 - Arles, Chapelle Sainte-Anne, Place de l'Hotel-de-Ville: “Guy Renne, the adventure of creation: a quest for harmony. The years 1970-1990 ”(September 7 to October 21, 2005).
- 2008 - Séoul (Corée) : Exhibition project.
- 2012 - Arles / Gaston de Luppé "The adventure of an artist in Arles area".
- 2014 - Chantelle / Office du tourisme " Charroux ". Indian inks.
- 2015 - Musée de Charroux - (heritage days) Permanent exhibition of works by the painter in Charroux.
- 2016 - Arles / La maison du luthier " Baroque gestures " ( various drawings).
- 2017 - Verneuil en Bourbonnais " Romeo Vasquez - the young romantic painter "works of youth".
- 2018 - Fontvieille / Hotel de ville " Fontvieille 1950-1990 ".
- 2018- 2019 - Arles / Église St Julien " Commemoration of the 60th anniversary of the Stations of the Cross " ( commande de l'État ).

== Bibliography ==
- Thérèse Renne, Guy Renne, l'aventure d'une création, Cercle d'art, Paris, 2005 (ISBN 2-7022-0796-0).
- Arbres et pierres dans l'œuvre de Guy Renne, ou Du champ moissonné au chant exalté, Arles, 1994.
- Guy Renne et la Provence, livret de l'exposition, Fontvieille, 1994.
- Guy Renne, peintures et dessins, livret de l'exposition, Martigues, 1995.
- (ko) Guy Renne, Séoul, Ministère de la Culture, République de Corée, 2008 (ISBN 978-89-960857-0-6), ouvrage rédigé en coréen et en français à l'occasion de la grande exposition prévue en 2008 à Séoul19.
- Thérèse Renne, Guy Renne, l'aventure d'une création, DVD, 2008.
