= Saint-Loup, Allier =

Saint-Loup
- Commune
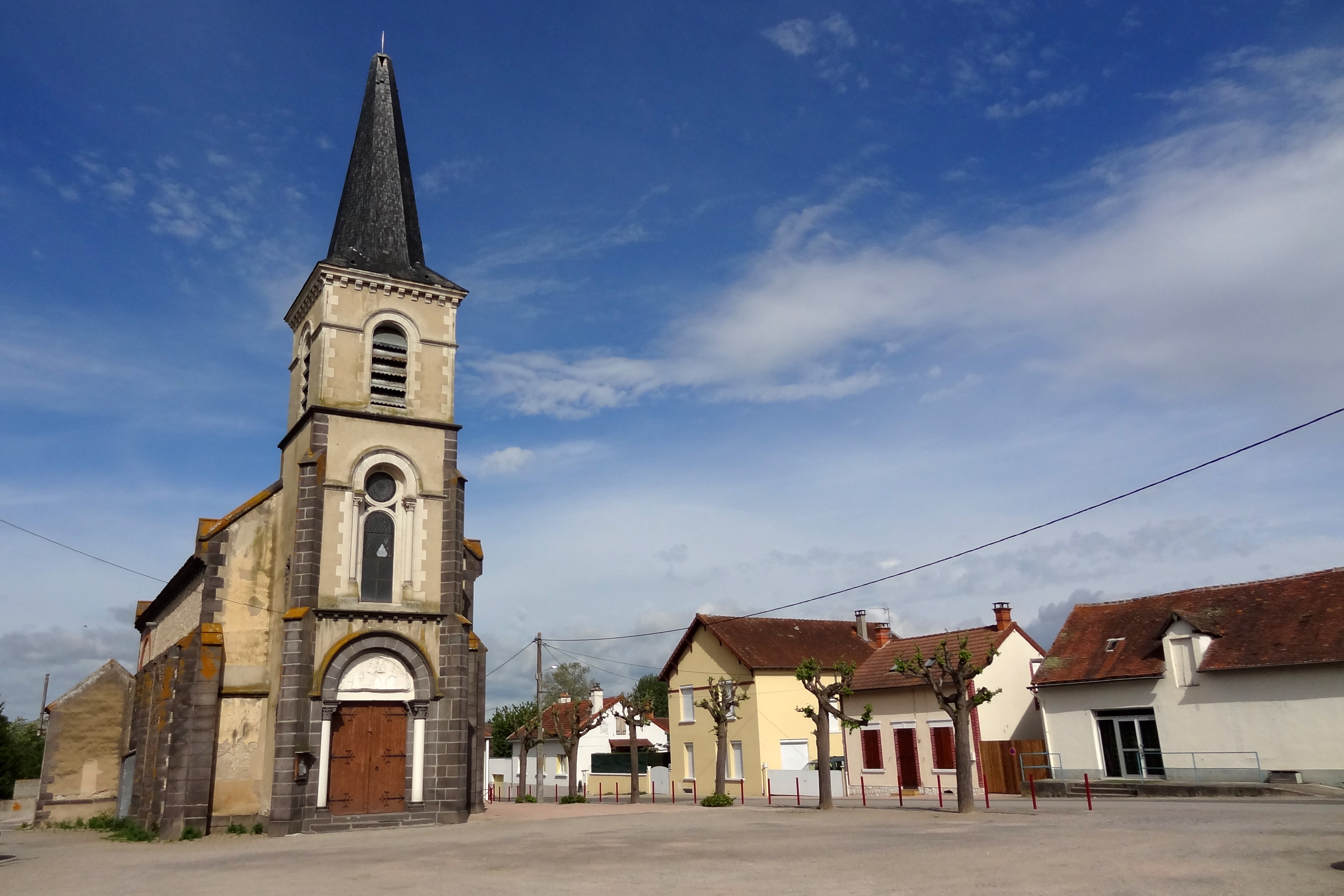
- The church in Saint-Loup

- Coat of arms
- Location of Saint-Loup
- Location within France Location within Auvergne-Rhône-Alpes
- Coordinates: 46°21′07″N 3°22′43″E
- Country: France
- Region: Auvergne-Rhône-Alpes
- Department: Allier
- Arrondissement: Vichy
- Canton: Saint-Pourçain-sur-Sioule
- Intercommunality: Saint-Pourçain Sioule Limagne

Government
  - Mayor (2026–32): Gérard Longeot
- Area^{1}: 17.62 km^{2} (6.80 sq mi)
- Elevation: 244 m (801 ft)
- Highest elevation: 292 m (958 ft)
- Lowest elevation: 225 m (738 ft)
- Population (2023): 575
  - Density: 32.6/km^{2} (84.5/sq mi)
- Time zone: UTC+01:00 (CET)
  - Summer (DST): UTC+02:00 (CEST)
- INSEE/Postal code: 03242 /03150
- ^{1} French Land Register data, which excludes lakes, ponds, glaciers > 1 km^{2} (0.386 sq mi or 247 acres) and river estuaries.

Saint-Loup (French pronunciation: [sɛ̃ lu]) is a commune in the Allier department in Auvergne-Rhône-Alpes in central France.

== Population ==
Historical population
Year	Pop.	±% p.a.
1968	597	—
1975	578	−0.46%
1982	621	+1.03%
1990	619	−0.04%
1999	585	−0.63%
2007	594	+0.19%
2012	545	−1.71%
2017	568	+0.83%
2023	575	+0.20%
Source: INSEE

== See also ==
- Communes of the Allier department
