= Sanssat =

- Commune
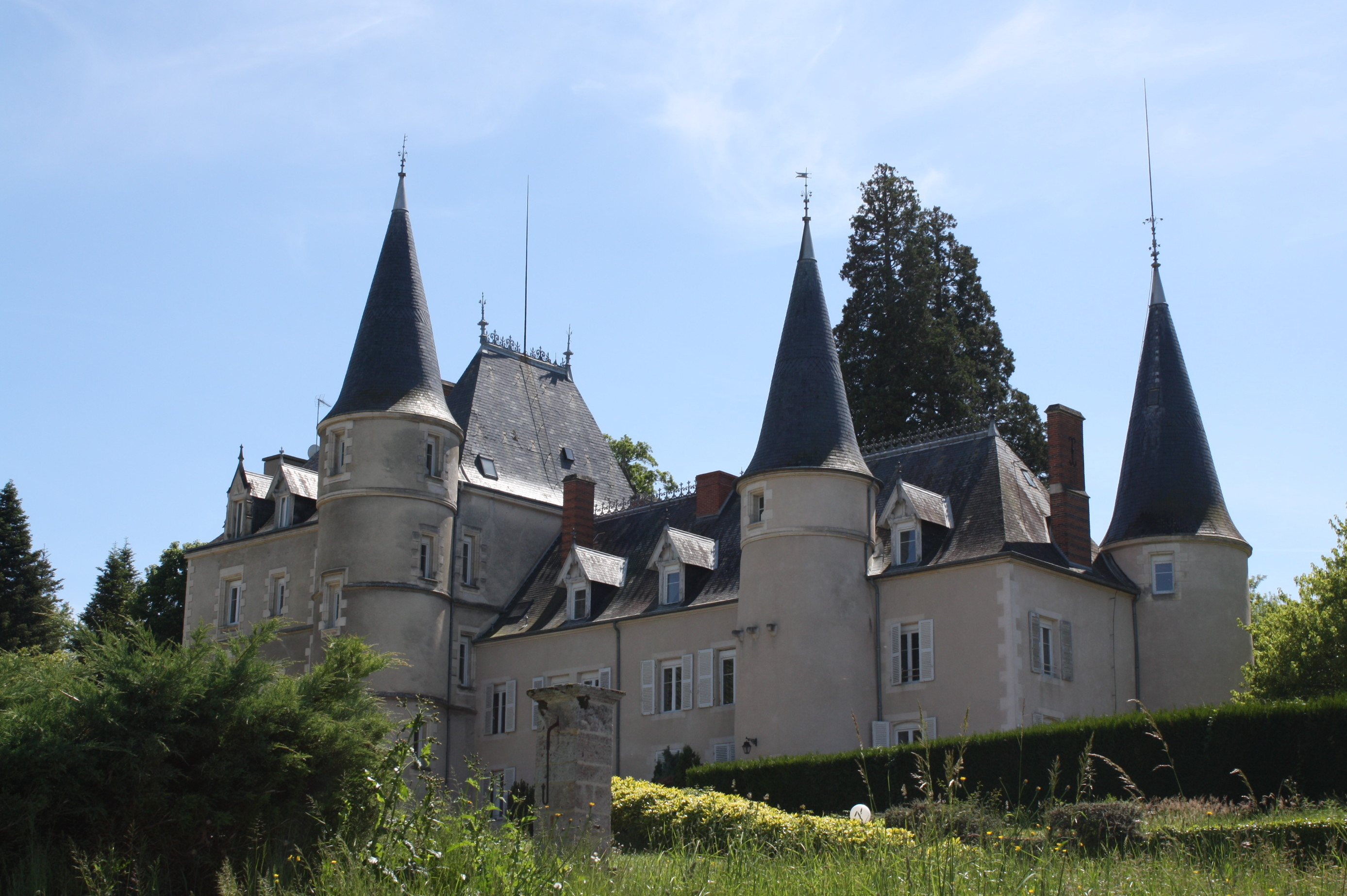
- The Château de Saint Alyre, in Sanssat
- Location of Sanssat
- Location within France Location within Auvergne-Rhône-Alpes
- Coordinates: 46°15′22″N 3°28′33″E
- Country: France
- Region: Auvergne-Rhône-Alpes
- Department: Allier
- Arrondissement: Vichy
- Canton: Saint-Pourçain-sur-Sioule

Government
  - Mayor (2026–32): Romain Guillaume
- Area^{1}: 8.4 km^{2} (3.2 sq mi)
- Elevation: 355 m (1,165 ft)
- Highest elevation: 367 m (1,204 ft)
- Lowest elevation: 249 m (817 ft)
- Population (2023): 276
  - Density: 33/km^{2} (85/sq mi)
- Time zone: UTC+01:00 (CET)
  - Summer (DST): UTC+02:00 (CEST)
- INSEE/Postal code: 03266 /03150
- ^{1} French Land Register data, which excludes lakes, ponds, glaciers > 1 km^{2} (0.386 sq mi or 247 acres) and river estuaries.

Sanssat (French pronunciation: [sɑ̃sa]) is a commune in the Allier department in Auvergne-Rhône-Alpes in central France.

== Population ==
Historical population
Year	Pop.	±% p.a.
1968	328	—
1975	309	−0.85%
1982	280	−1.40%
1990	287	+0.31%
1999	277	−0.39%
2007	293	+0.70%
2012	260	−2.36%
2017	259	−0.08%
2023	276	+1.07%
Source: INSEE

== See also ==
- Communes of the Allier department
