= Saint-Félix, Allier =

Saint-Félix
- Commune
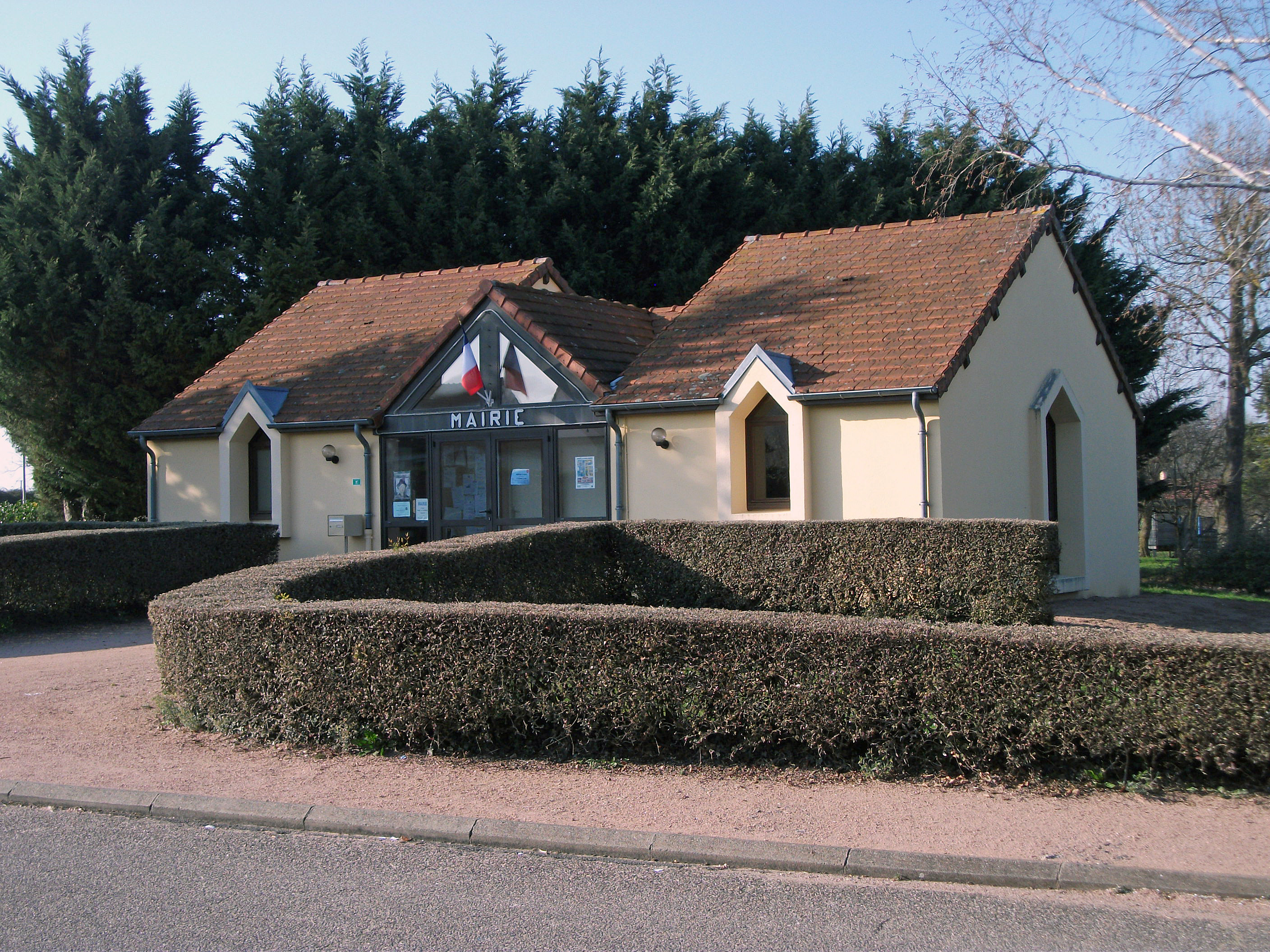
- Town hall
- Location of Saint-Félix
- Location within France Location within Auvergne-Rhône-Alpes
- Coordinates: 46°13′42″N 3°28′54″E
- Country: France
- Region: Auvergne-Rhône-Alpes
- Department: Allier
- Arrondissement: Vichy
- Canton: Saint-Pourçain-sur-Sioule

Government
  - Mayor (2026–32): Catherine Corti
- Area^{1}: 5.2 km^{2} (2.0 sq mi)
- Elevation: 350 m (1,150 ft)
- Highest elevation: 373 m (1,224 ft)
- Lowest elevation: 285 m (935 ft)
- Population (2023): 279
  - Density: 54/km^{2} (140/sq mi)
- Time zone: UTC+01:00 (CET)
  - Summer (DST): UTC+02:00 (CEST)
- INSEE/Postal code: 03232 /03260
- ^{1} French Land Register data, which excludes lakes, ponds, glaciers > 1 km^{2} (0.386 sq mi or 247 acres) and river estuaries.

Saint-Félix is a commune in the Allier department in Auvergne-Rhône-Alpes in central France.

== Population ==
Historical population
Year	Pop.	±% p.a.
1968	150	—
1975	148	−0.19%
1982	167	+1.74%
1990	248	+5.07%
1999	252	+0.18%
2007	325	+3.23%
2012	339	+0.85%
2017	315	−1.46%
2023	279	−2.00%
Source: INSEE

== See also ==
- Communes of the Allier department
