= Louchy-Montfand =

- Commune
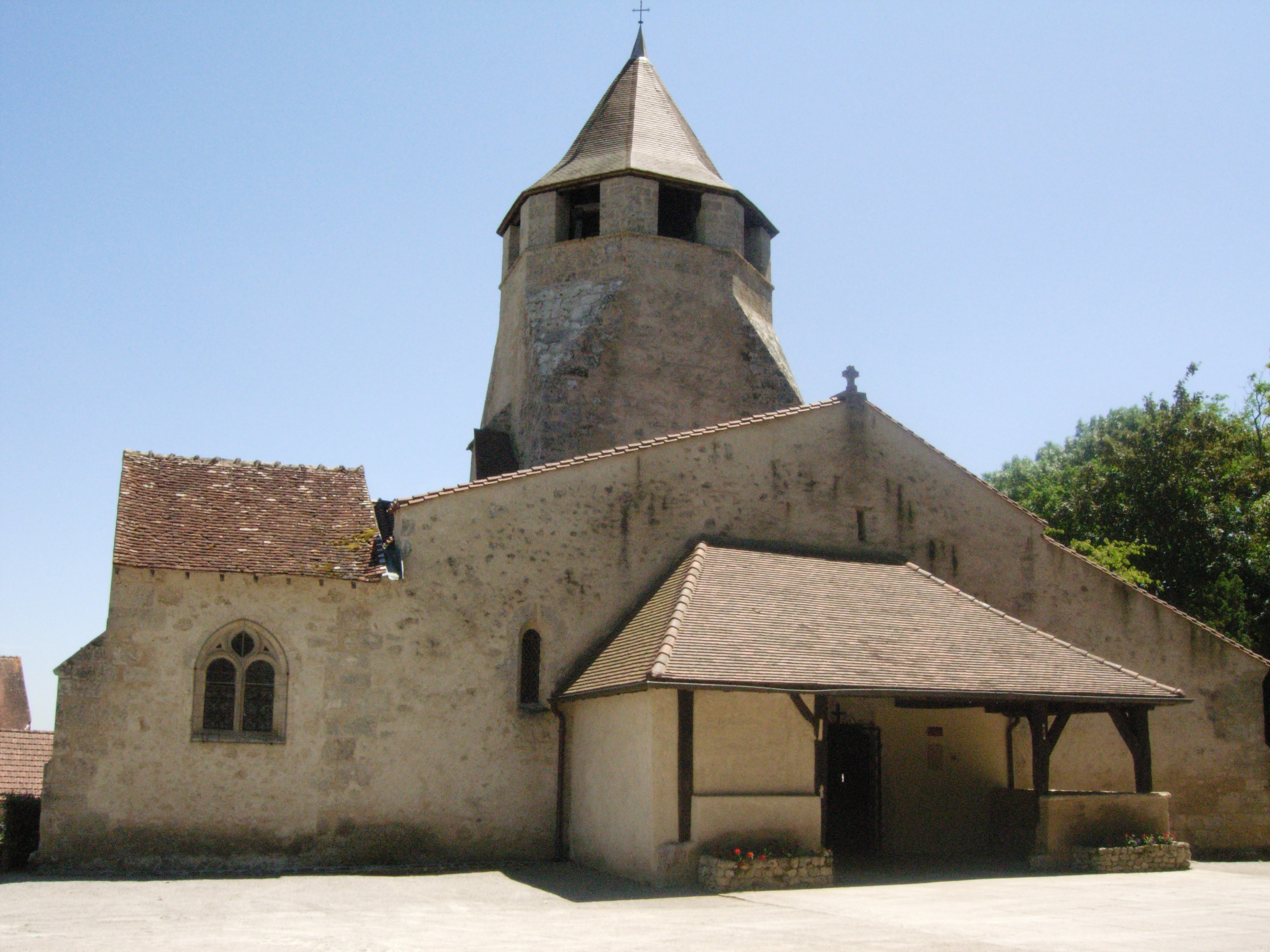
- The church in Louchy-Montfand
- Location of Louchy-Montfand
- Location within France Location within Auvergne-Rhône-Alpes
- Coordinates: 46°18′28″N 3°14′47″E
- Country: France
- Region: Auvergne-Rhône-Alpes
- Department: Allier
- Arrondissement: Vichy
- Canton: Saint-Pourçain-sur-Sioule
- Intercommunality: Saint-Pourçain Sioule Limagne

Government
  - Mayor (2026–32): Bruno Chanet
- Area^{1}: 5.33 km^{2} (2.06 sq mi)
- Elevation: 270 m (890 ft)
- Highest elevation: 342 m (1,122 ft)
- Lowest elevation: 241 m (791 ft)
- Population (2023): 397
  - Density: 74.5/km^{2} (193/sq mi)
- Time zone: UTC+01:00 (CET)
  - Summer (DST): UTC+02:00 (CEST)
- INSEE/Postal code: 03149 /03500
- ^{1} French Land Register data, which excludes lakes, ponds, glaciers > 1 km^{2} (0.386 sq mi or 247 acres) and river estuaries.

Louchy-Montfand (French pronunciation: [luʃi mɔ̃fɑ̃]; Occitan: Lochac e Montfand) is a commune in the Allier department in central France.

== Population ==
Historical population
Year	Pop.	±% p.a.
1968	385	—
1975	348	−1.43%
1982	361	+0.53%
1990	378	+0.58%
1999	424	+1.28%
2007	451	+0.77%
2012	431	−0.90%
2017	437	+0.28%
2023	397	−1.59%
Source: INSEE

== See also ==
- Communes of the Allier department
