= Rongères =

- Commune
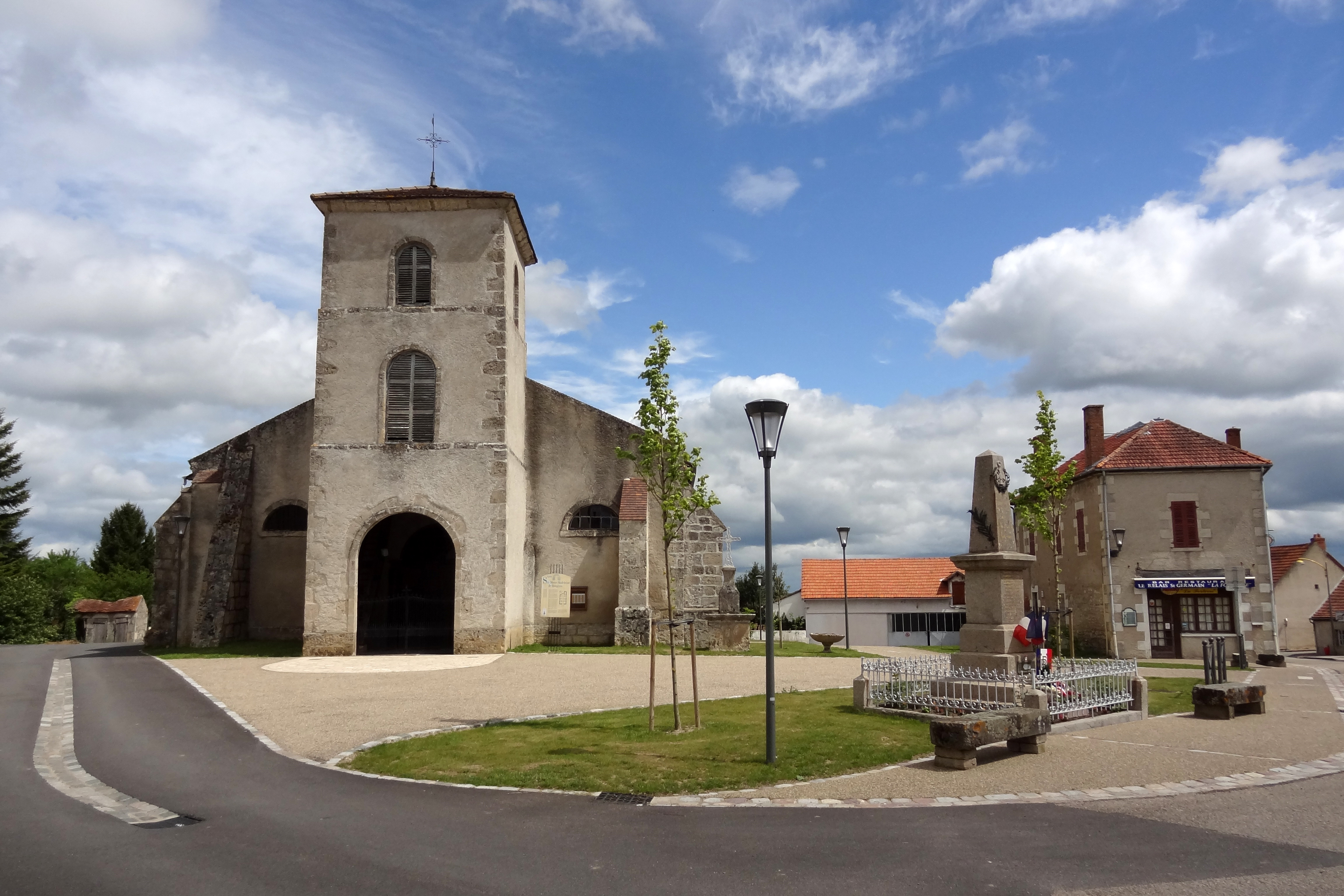
- The church in Rongères
- Location of Rongères
- Location within France Location within Auvergne-Rhône-Alpes
- Coordinates: 46°17′42″N 3°27′04″E
- Country: France
- Region: Auvergne-Rhône-Alpes
- Department: Allier
- Arrondissement: Vichy
- Canton: Saint-Pourçain-sur-Sioule

Government
  - Mayor (2026–32): Christophe Minet
- Area^{1}: 8.95 km^{2} (3.46 sq mi)
- Elevation: 275 m (902 ft)
- Highest elevation: 305 m (1,001 ft)
- Lowest elevation: 242 m (794 ft)
- Population (2023): 555
  - Density: 62.0/km^{2} (161/sq mi)
- Time zone: UTC+01:00 (CET)
  - Summer (DST): UTC+02:00 (CEST)
- INSEE/Postal code: 03215 /03150
- ^{1} French Land Register data, which excludes lakes, ponds, glaciers > 1 km^{2} (0.386 sq mi or 247 acres) and river estuaries.

Rongères (French pronunciation: [ʁɔ̃ʒɛʁ]; Occitan: Rongèiras) is a commune in the Allier department in Auvergne in central France.

== Population ==
Historical population
Year	Pop.	±% p.a.
1968	444	—
1975	430	−0.46%
1982	509	+2.44%
1990	570	+1.42%
1999	566	−0.08%
2007	535	−0.70%
2012	595	+2.15%
2017	565	−1.03%
2023	555	−0.30%
Source: INSEE

== Gallery ==
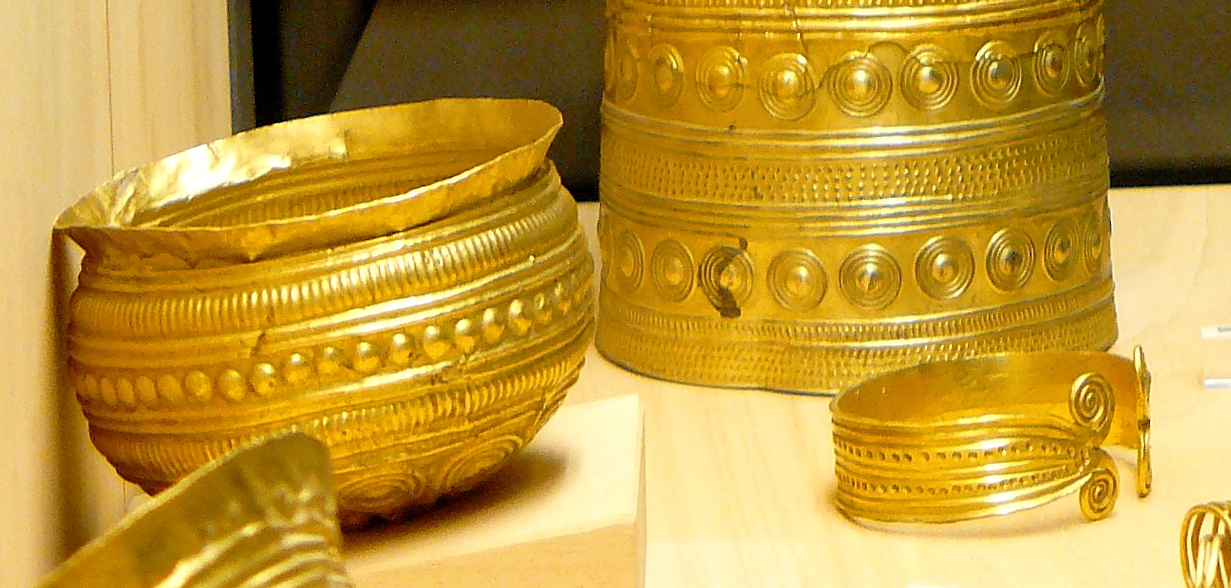
Bronze Age gold bowl and bracelet found in Rongères, Tumulus culture, c. 1400 BC.

== See also ==
- Communes of the Allier department
