= Canton of Saint-Pourçain-sur-Sioule =

Coordinates: 46°18′30″N 3°17′24″E

Saint-Pourçain-sur-Sioule
- Canton
- Interactive map of Saint-Pourçain-sur-Sioule
- Country: France
- Region: Auvergne-Rhône-Alpes
- Department: Allier
- No. of communes: {{{nbcomm}}}
- Area: 314.94 km^{2} (121.60 sq mi)
- Population (2023): 18,824
  - Density: 59.770/km^{2} (154.80/sq mi)
- INSEE code: 03 15

The canton of Saint-Pourçain-sur-Sioule is a French administrative division in the county of Allier and region Auvergne-Rhône-Alpes. At the French canton reorganisation which came into effect in March 2015, the canton was expanded from 14 to 22 communes:

1. Bayet
2. Billy
3. Boucé
4. Créchy
5. Langy
6. Loriges
7. Louchy-Montfand
8. Magnet
9. Marcenat
10. Montaigu-le-Blin
11. Montoldre
12. Montord
13. Paray-sous-Briailles
14. Rongères
15. Saint-Félix
16. Saint-Gérand-le-Puy
17. Saint-Loup
18. Saint-Pourçain-sur-Sioule
19. Sanssat
20. Saulcet
21. Seuillet
22. Varennes-sur-Allier
