= Langy =

- Commune
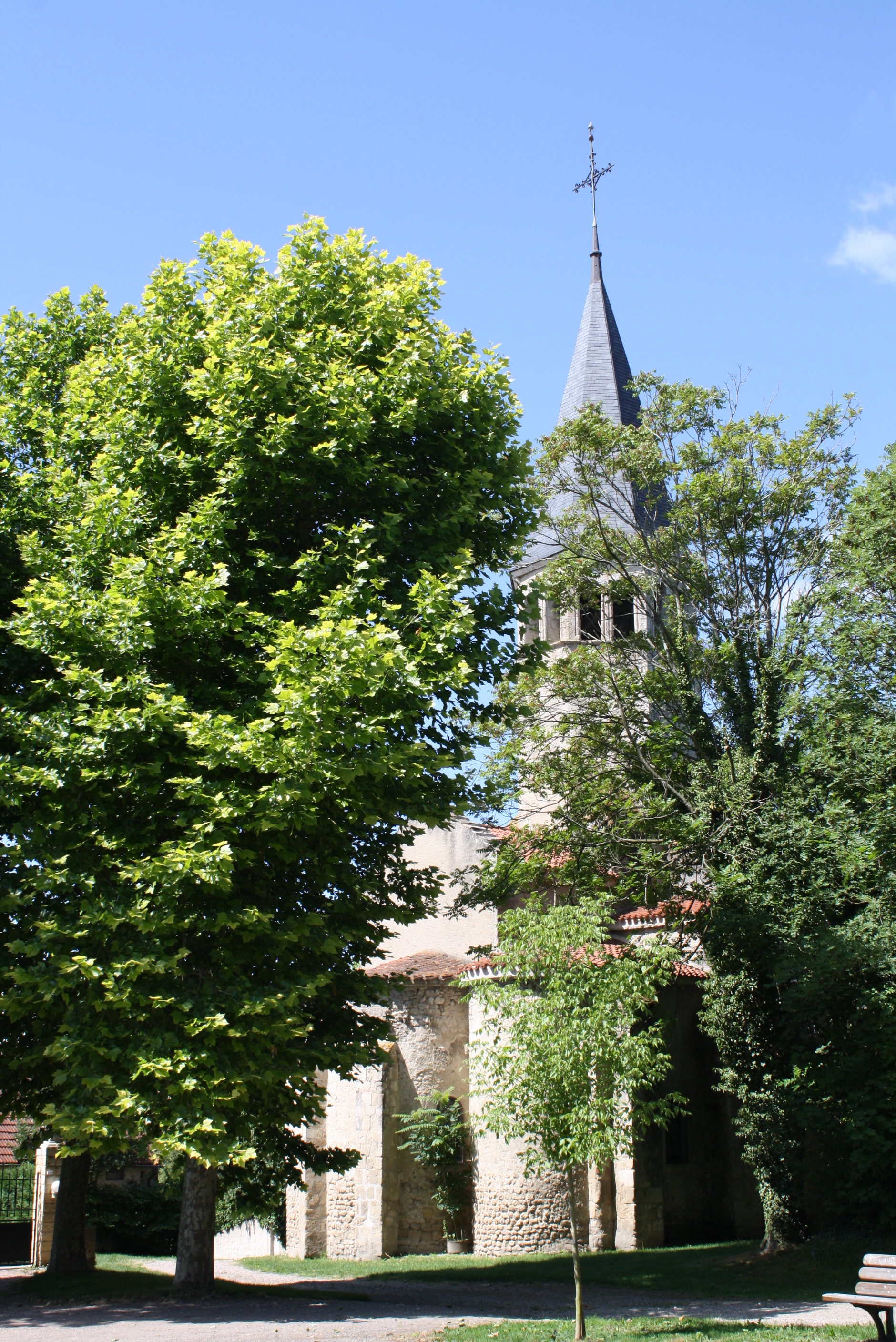
- The church in Langy
- Location of Langy
- Location within France Location within Auvergne-Rhône-Alpes
- Coordinates: 46°16′06″N 3°28′22″E
- Country: France
- Region: Auvergne-Rhône-Alpes
- Department: Allier
- Arrondissement: Vichy
- Canton: Saint-Pourçain-sur-Sioule
- Intercommunality: Entr'Allier Besbre et Loire

Government
  - Mayor (2026–32): Franck Fortin
- Area^{1}: 7.36 km^{2} (2.84 sq mi)
- Elevation: 336 m (1,102 ft)
- Highest elevation: 342 m (1,122 ft)
- Lowest elevation: 260 m (850 ft)
- Population (2023): 280
  - Density: 38/km^{2} (99/sq mi)
- Time zone: UTC+01:00 (CET)
  - Summer (DST): UTC+02:00 (CEST)
- INSEE/Postal code: 03137 /03150
- ^{1} French Land Register data, which excludes lakes, ponds, glaciers > 1 km^{2} (0.386 sq mi or 247 acres) and river estuaries.

Langy (French pronunciation: [lɑ̃ʒi]) is a commune in the Allier department in central France.

== Population ==
Historical population
Year	Pop.	±% p.a.
1968	259	—
1975	227	−1.87%
1982	187	−2.73%
1990	194	+0.46%
1999	218	+1.30%
2007	235	+0.94%
2012	262	+2.20%
2017	272	+0.75%
2023	280	+0.48%
Source: INSEE

== See also ==
- Communes of the Allier department
