= Montaigu-le-Blin =

- Commune
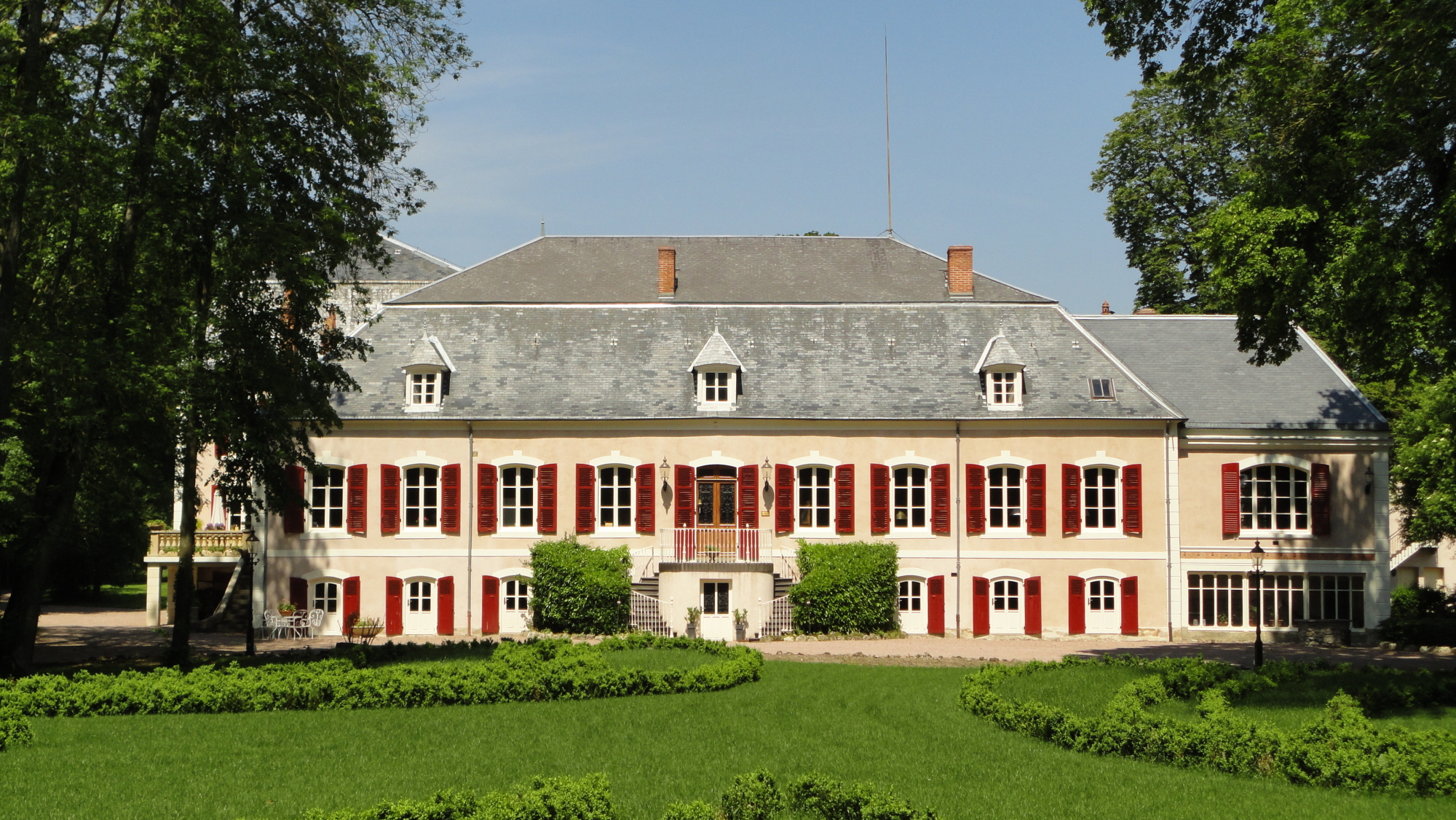
- The chateau in Montaigu-le-Blin
- Location of Montaigu-le-Blin
- Location within France Location within Auvergne-Rhône-Alpes
- Coordinates: 46°17′43″N 3°30′43″E
- Country: France
- Region: Auvergne-Rhône-Alpes
- Department: Allier
- Arrondissement: Vichy
- Canton: Saint-Pourçain-sur-Sioule
- Intercommunality: Entr'Allier Besbre et Loire

Government
  - Mayor (2026–32): Thierry Lafarge
- Area^{1}: 12.96 km^{2} (5.00 sq mi)
- Elevation: 331 m (1,086 ft)
- Highest elevation: 342 m (1,122 ft)
- Lowest elevation: 263 m (863 ft)
- Population (2023): 300
  - Density: 23/km^{2} (60/sq mi)
- Time zone: UTC+01:00 (CET)
  - Summer (DST): UTC+02:00 (CEST)
- INSEE/Postal code: 03179 /03150
- ^{1} French Land Register data, which excludes lakes, ponds, glaciers > 1 km^{2} (0.386 sq mi or 247 acres) and river estuaries.

Montaigu-le-Blin (French pronunciation: [mɔ̃tɛɡy lə blɛ̃]) is a commune in the Allier department in central France. It was first mentioned in the 10th century as Mons Acutus.

== Population ==
Historical population
| Year | Pop. | ±% p.a. |
|---|---|---|
| 1968 | 531 | — |
| 1975 | 475 | −1.58% |
| 1982 | 425 | −1.58% |
| 1990 | 374 | −1.59% |
| 1999 | 356 | −0.55% |
| 2007 | 307 | −1.83% |
| 2012 | 313 | +0.39% |
| 2017 | 302 | −0.71% |
| 2023 | 300 | −0.11% |
Source: INSEE

== See also ==
- Communes of the Allier department
