= Saulcet =

- Commune
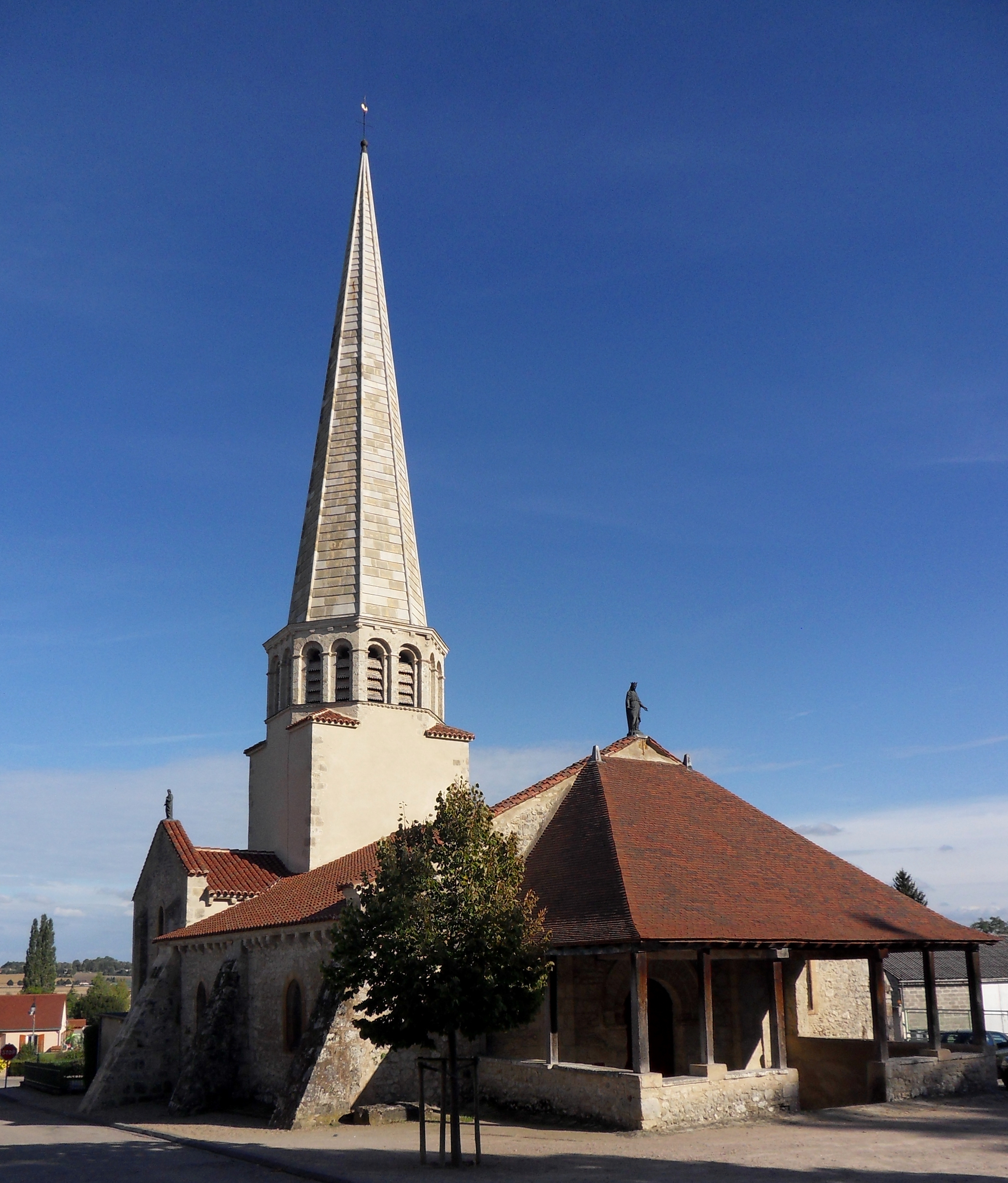
- The church in Saulcet
- Location of Saulcet
- Location within France Location within Auvergne-Rhône-Alpes
- Coordinates: 46°19′33″N 3°15′47″E
- Country: France
- Region: Auvergne-Rhône-Alpes
- Department: Allier
- Arrondissement: Vichy
- Canton: Saint-Pourçain-sur-Sioule

Government
  - Mayor (2026–32): Freddy Labussiere
- Area^{1}: 7.98 km^{2} (3.08 sq mi)
- Elevation: 254 m (833 ft)
- Highest elevation: 326 m (1,070 ft)
- Lowest elevation: 230 m (750 ft)
- Population (2023): 657
  - Density: 82.3/km^{2} (213/sq mi)
- Time zone: UTC+01:00 (CET)
  - Summer (DST): UTC+02:00 (CEST)
- INSEE/Postal code: 03267 /03500
- ^{1} French Land Register data, which excludes lakes, ponds, glaciers > 1 km^{2} (0.386 sq mi or 247 acres) and river estuaries.

Saulcet (French pronunciation: [solsɛ]) is a commune in the Allier department in Auvergne-Rhône-Alpes in central France.

== Population ==
Historical population
Year	Pop.	±% p.a.
1968	536	—
1975	519	−0.46%
1982	577	+1.52%
1990	589	+0.26%
1999	608	+0.35%
2007	655	+0.94%
2012	657	+0.06%
2017	693	+1.07%
2023	657	−0.89%
Source: INSEE

== See also ==
- Communes of the Allier department
