= Gilles Renne =

French jazz and fusion guitarist and composer

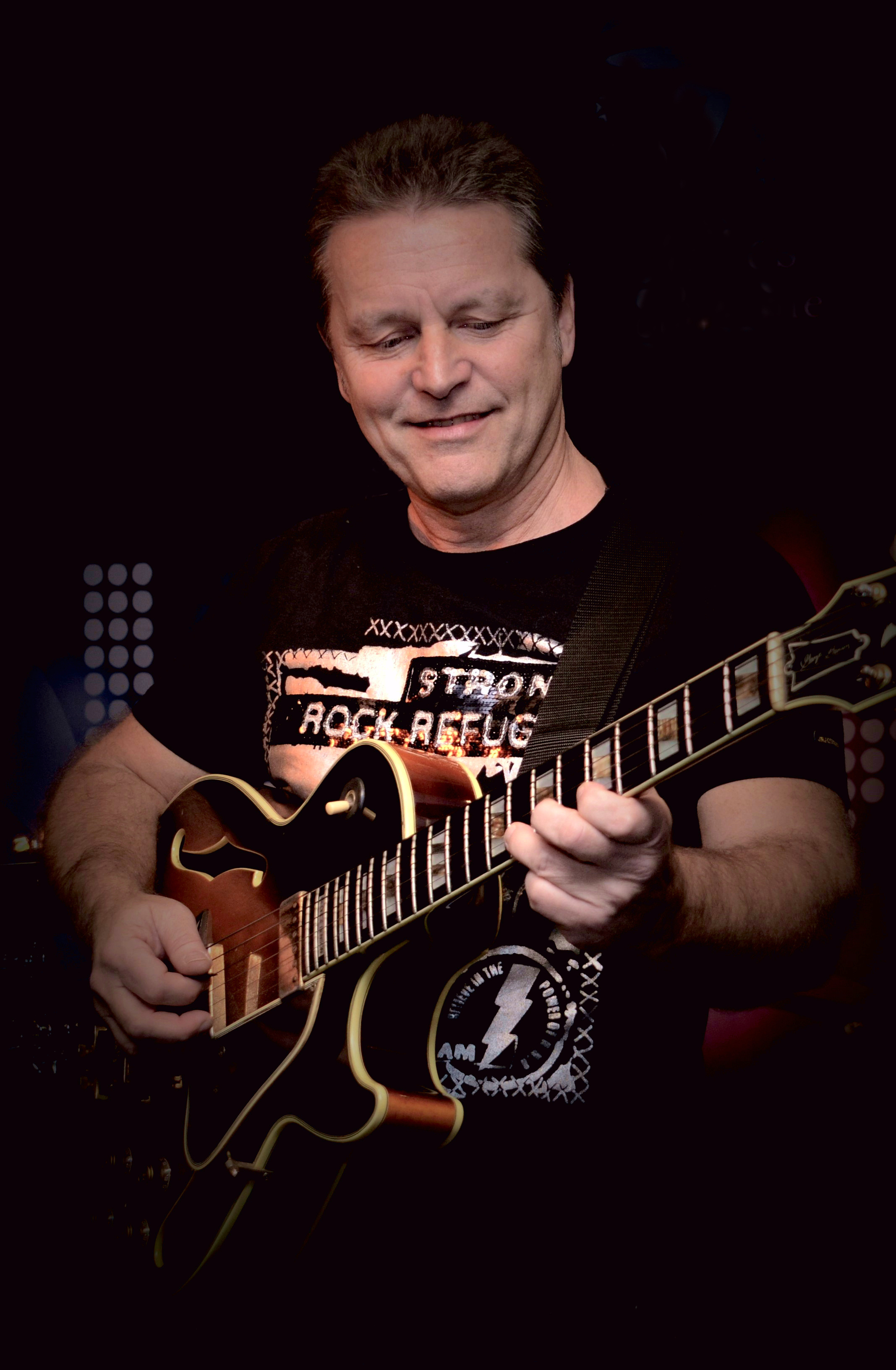

Background information
- Born: October 21, 1954 (age 72); Arles, France
- Genres: Jazz; Jazz fusion
- Occupations: guitarist, composer, arranger
- Instrument: guitar
- Label: Cristal Records

Gilles Renne (born October 21, 1954, in Arles) is a French jazz-fusion guitarist and composer.

== Biography ==
Gilles grew up in a family where art and culture hold an important place his father is the painter Guy Renne his mother Thérèse Renne teaches ancient letters and is a writer. He first started playing the guitar as an autodidact then obtained his admission to the Guitar Institute of Technology in Los Angeles from which he graduated in 1980. In 1984 he won the first prize for guitar at the national jazz competition in Paris, La Défense.

== Career ==
Gilles Renne met saxophonist Philippe Sellam with whom he successively founded the jazz quartet Sellam-Renne Quartet in 1986, then in 1992 the "African Project", a group resulting from multiple musical encounters during tours in black Africa. This group which mixes Jazz with traditional African music will notably include the balafon player Aly Keïta, Linley Marthe (bass), Thierry Arpino (drums). At the beginning of the 90s, he will be the guitarist of Bext'tet the group of organist Emmanuel Bex and will also be part of the Big Band "Quoi de neuf docteur".

In 1999, he founded with organist Philippe Petit the quartet "Myster Hyde", then "Jazz Runners", with which he toured in 2012 in Venezuela which resulted in a feature film "Venez jouer là".

In 2006, with Philippe Sellam, he created "No Spirit", a "Jazz-groove" quartet, including Fred Dupont (Hammond organ) and Christophe Bras (drums).

As sidemen or as a guest Gilles Renne had the opportunity to play with Rhoda Scott, Manu Dibango, Souad Massi, Linley Marthe, Dominique Di Piazza, Hadrien Ferraud, Jean-Philippe Fanfan, Stephane Huchard, Jean-Pierre Como, etc.

In addition to his activities as a musician, he leads numerous workshops and master-classes around the world.

== Discography ==
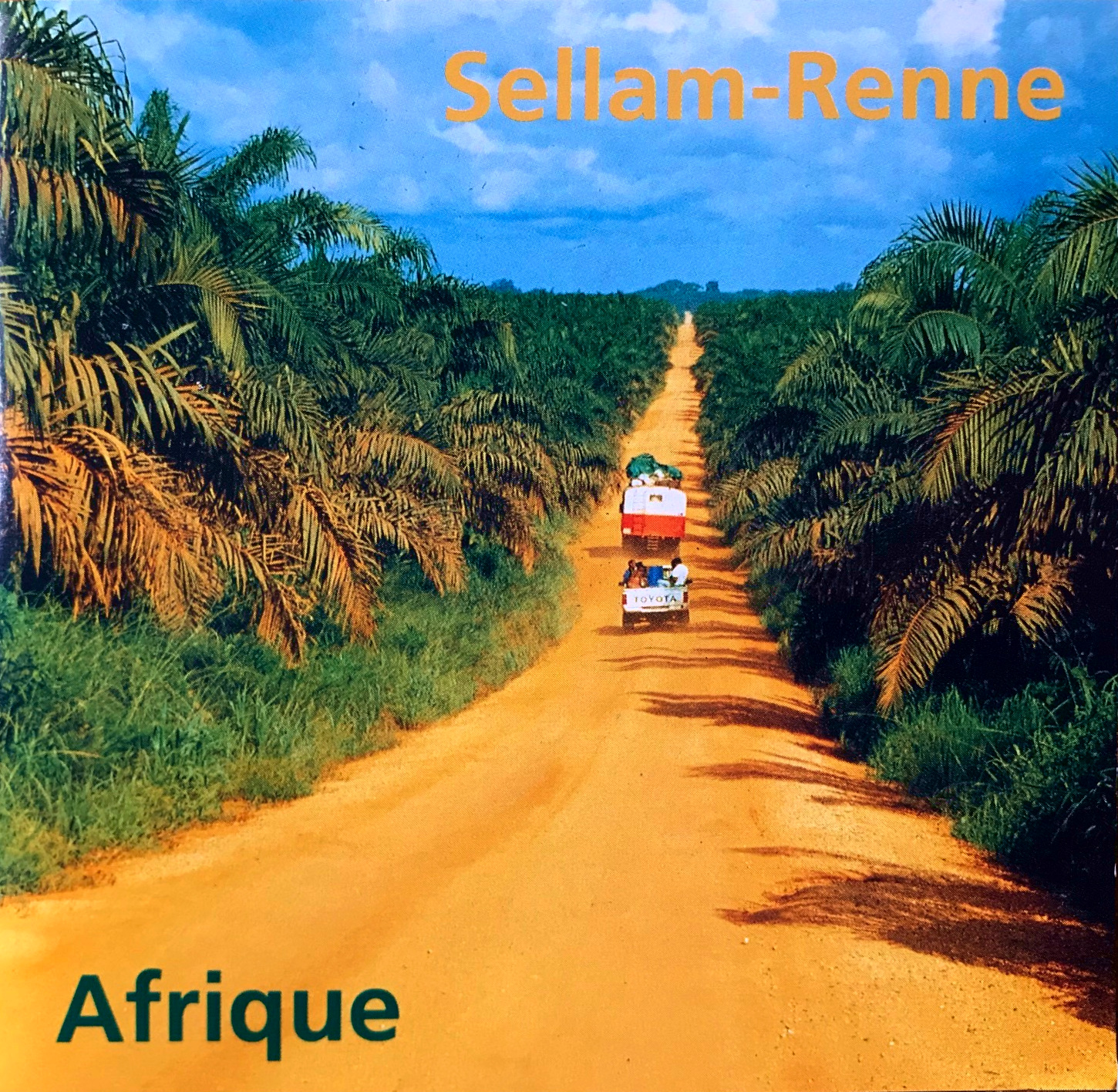
Sellam-Renne / African Project, "Afrique" (Live / Tour in 7 different central africa countries), 1993

GillesRenne has released or participated in more than thirty albums. Here below are the main ones.

=== As a leader or co-leader ===
- Sellam-Renne Quartet, Rendez-vous,1990.
- Quoi neuf docteur (Big Band), Le retour, 1991.
- Sellam-Renne Quartet, Vent d'Est,1992.
- Quoi neuf docteur (Big Band), En attendant la pluie,1993.
- Sellam-Renne / African Project, Afrique (Live / tournée dans 7 pays d'Afrique centrale), 1993
- Sellam-Renne / African Project, Embrasse moi (Gabon), 1995
- Sellam-Renne / African Project, Traditional Odyssey avec le bassiste Lynley Marthe (Océan Indien), 1996
- Sellam-Renne / African Project, Abidjan (Côte d'Ivoire & Burkina Fasso), 1998
- Mister Hyde Quartet, Mister Hyde, 1999
- Sellam-Renne / African Project, Live à Saint-Louis Sénégal, 2000
- Mister Hyde Quartet, Back to the beat, 2002
- Mister Hyde Quartet, Ultime atome Live, 2005
- Sellam-Renne / African Project, Sortilége Live Paris, 2006
- Sellam- Renne / No Spirit, No Spirit (CD Live Paris + DVD Live in Séoul), 2008
- Sellam- Renne / No Spirit, Give me 5, 2011
- Jazz Runners "Funky ways" Live Paris, 2016
- Hammond Legend "Black magic woman", 2018
- Hammond Legend "Sittin' on the dock of the B3", 2020

=== As sideman ===
==== Quoi de Neuf Docteur (Big band) ====
- Le retour, 1991.
- En attendant la pluie, 1993.

==== With Emmanuel Bex ====
- Enfance, Bextet ,1991
- Harlem nocturne, Jean- Michel Proust, 1996

==== With Stefan Patry ====
- Organic Jungle, 1998
- Live au Duc des Lombards, 2002
- Singer ,2012

==== With Others ====
- Rialzu (Rigiru 1978 / Réedition CD 2008)
- Tribute to the mother of groove (Philippe Combelle octet 2004)
- Obrigado, René Sopa quintet, 2011
- Rose & Blues, Rose quartet, 2017

== Films & DVD ==
- DVD "Live in Séoul" (No Spirit - 2008).
- DVD "African Project" (Sellam-Renne - 2009).
- FILM "Venez jouer là" (Jazz Runners - 2012).
