= Montoldre =

- Commune
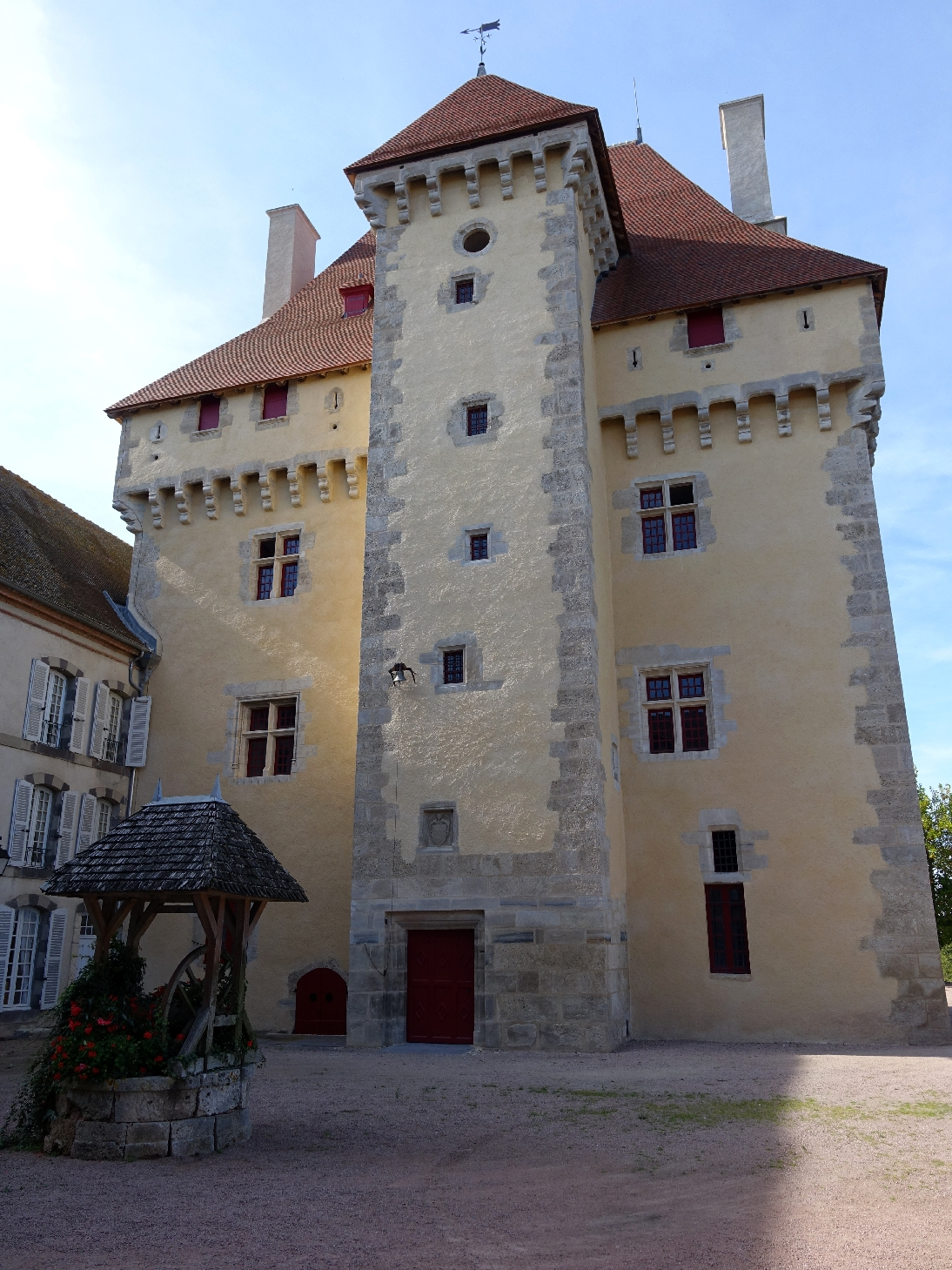
- The chateau of Gayette, in Montoldre
- Location of Montoldre
- Location within France Location within Auvergne-Rhône-Alpes
- Coordinates: 46°20′07″N 3°26′50″E
- Country: France
- Region: Auvergne-Rhône-Alpes
- Department: Allier
- Arrondissement: Vichy
- Canton: Saint-Pourçain-sur-Sioule

Government
  - Mayor (2026–32): Marie-Jo Margelidon-Fouquet
- Area^{1}: 18.9 km^{2} (7.3 sq mi)
- Elevation: 280 m (920 ft)
- Highest elevation: 307 m (1,007 ft)
- Lowest elevation: 239 m (784 ft)
- Population (2023): 590
  - Density: 31/km^{2} (81/sq mi)
- Time zone: UTC+01:00 (CET)
  - Summer (DST): UTC+02:00 (CEST)
- INSEE/Postal code: 03187 /03150
- ^{1} French Land Register data, which excludes lakes, ponds, glaciers > 1 km^{2} (0.386 sq mi or 247 acres) and river estuaries.

Montoldre (French pronunciation: [mɔ̃tɔldʁ]) is a commune in the Allier department in central France.

== Population ==
Historical population
Year	Pop.	±% p.a.
1968	702	—
1975	666	−0.75%
1982	647	−0.41%
1990	645	−0.04%
1999	605	−0.71%
2007	638	+0.67%
2012	634	−0.13%
2017	632	−0.06%
2023	590	−1.14%
Source: INSEE

== See also ==
- Communes of the Allier department
