= Montord =

- Commune
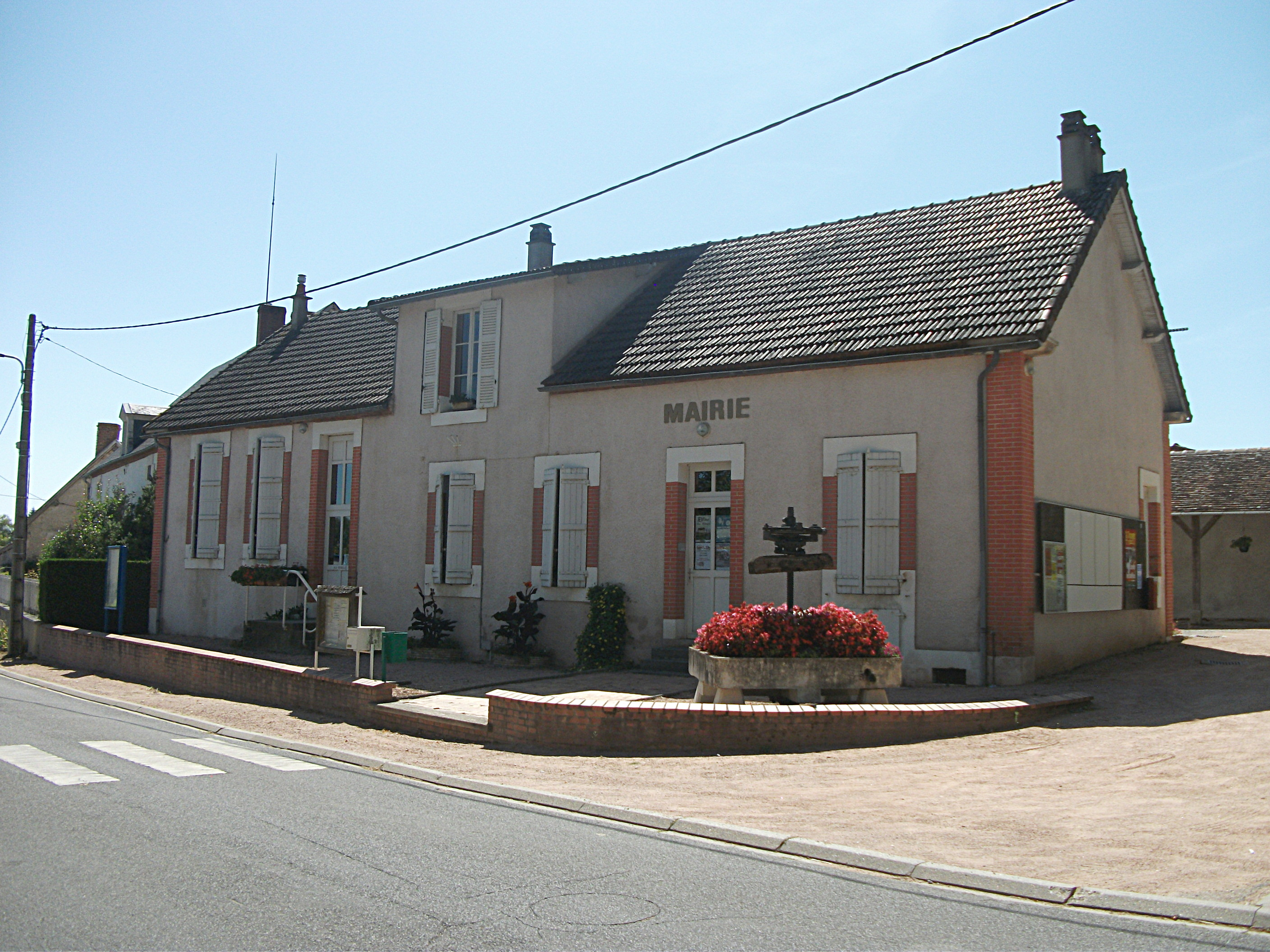
- Town hall
- Location of Montord
- Location within France Location within Auvergne-Rhône-Alpes
- Coordinates: 46°17′38″N 3°13′52″E
- Country: France
- Region: Auvergne-Rhône-Alpes
- Department: Allier
- Arrondissement: Vichy
- Canton: Saint-Pourçain-sur-Sioule
- Intercommunality: Saint-Pourçain Sioule Limagne

Government
  - Mayor (2026–32): Yannick Touzain
- Area^{1}: 4.44 km^{2} (1.71 sq mi)
- Elevation: 285 m (935 ft)
- Highest elevation: 338 m (1,109 ft)
- Lowest elevation: 255 m (837 ft)
- Population (2023): 211
  - Density: 47.5/km^{2} (123/sq mi)
- Time zone: UTC+01:00 (CET)
  - Summer (DST): UTC+02:00 (CEST)
- INSEE/Postal code: 03188 /03500
- ^{1} French Land Register data, which excludes lakes, ponds, glaciers > 1 km^{2} (0.386 sq mi or 247 acres) and river estuaries.

Montord (French pronunciation: [mɔ̃tɔʁ]; Occitan: Monttòrt) is a commune in the Allier department in central France.

== Population ==
Historical population
Year	Pop.	±% p.a.
1968	229	—
1975	286	+3.23%
1982	194	−5.39%
1990	208	+0.87%
1999	236	+1.41%
2007	248	+0.62%
2012	220	−2.37%
2017	215	−0.46%
2023	211	−0.31%
Source: INSEE

== See also ==
- Communes of the Allier department
