= Loriges =

- Commune
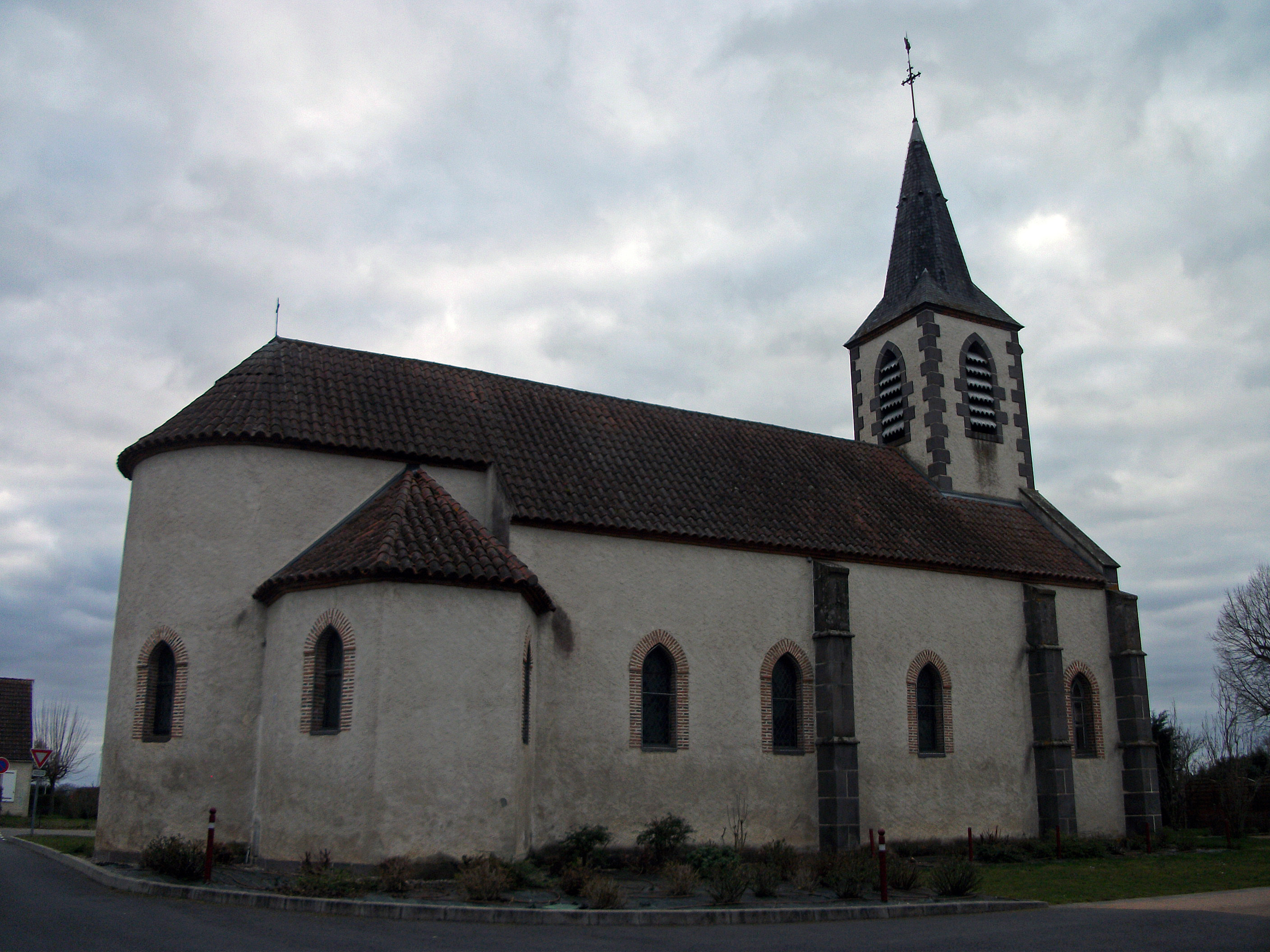
- Church

- Coat of arms
- Location of Loriges
- Location within France Location within Auvergne-Rhône-Alpes
- Coordinates: 46°16′12″N 3°20′51″E
- Country: France
- Region: Auvergne-Rhône-Alpes
- Department: Allier
- Arrondissement: Vichy
- Canton: Saint-Pourçain-sur-Sioule

Government
  - Mayor (2026–32): Christophe Delamare
- Area^{1}: 9.48 km^{2} (3.66 sq mi)
- Elevation: 266 m (873 ft)
- Highest elevation: 284 m (932 ft)
- Lowest elevation: 240 m (790 ft)
- Population (2023): 350
  - Density: 37/km^{2} (96/sq mi)
- Time zone: UTC+01:00 (CET)
  - Summer (DST): UTC+02:00 (CEST)
- INSEE/Postal code: 03148 /03500
- ^{1} French Land Register data, which excludes lakes, ponds, glaciers > 1 km^{2} (0.386 sq mi or 247 acres) and river estuaries.

Loriges (French pronunciation: [lɔʁiʒ]) is a commune in the Allier department in central France.

== Population ==
Historical population
Year	Pop.	±% p.a.
1968	296	—
1975	281	−0.74%
1982	271	−0.52%
1990	323	+2.22%
1999	326	+0.10%
2007	295	−1.24%
2012	354	+3.71%
2017	350	−0.23%
2023	350	+0.00%
Source: INSEE

== See also ==
- Communes of the Allier department
