= Marcenat, Allier =

Marcenat
- Commune
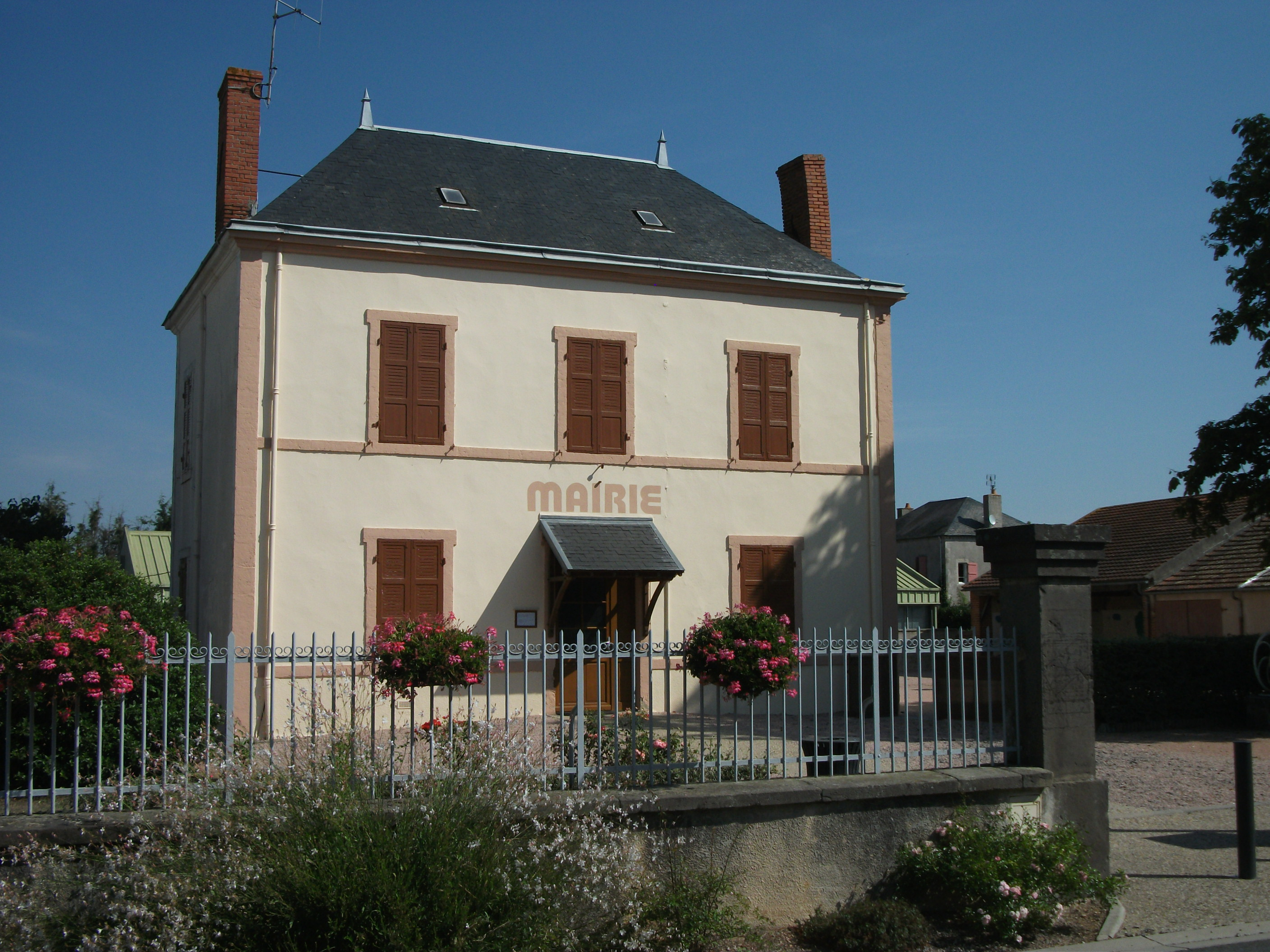
- Town hall

- Coat of arms
- Location of Marcenat
- Location within France Location within Auvergne-Rhône-Alpes
- Coordinates: 46°14′08″N 3°23′48″E
- Country: France
- Region: Auvergne-Rhône-Alpes
- Department: Allier
- Arrondissement: Vichy
- Canton: Saint-Pourçain-sur-Sioule
- Intercommunality: Saint-Pourçain Sioule Limagne

Government
  - Mayor (2026–32): Gilles Paris
- Area^{1}: 18.07 km^{2} (6.98 sq mi)
- Elevation: 265 m (869 ft)
- Highest elevation: 287 m (942 ft)
- Lowest elevation: 234 m (768 ft)
- Population (2023): 386
  - Density: 21.4/km^{2} (55.3/sq mi)
- Time zone: UTC+01:00 (CET)
  - Summer (DST): UTC+02:00 (CEST)
- INSEE/Postal code: 03160 /03260
- ^{1} French Land Register data, which excludes lakes, ponds, glaciers > 1 km^{2} (0.386 sq mi or 247 acres) and river estuaries.

Marcenat is a commune in the Allier department in central France.

== Population ==
Historical population
| Year | Pop. | ±% p.a. |
|---|---|---|
| 1968 | 359 | — |
| 1975 | 291 | −2.96% |
| 1982 | 349 | +2.63% |
| 1990 | 330 | −0.70% |
| 1999 | 303 | −0.94% |
| 2007 | 358 | +2.11% |
| 2012 | 371 | +0.72% |
| 2017 | 405 | +1.77% |
| 2023 | 386 | −0.80% |
Source: INSEE

== See also ==
- Communes of the Allier department
