= Boucé, Allier =

Boucé
- Commune
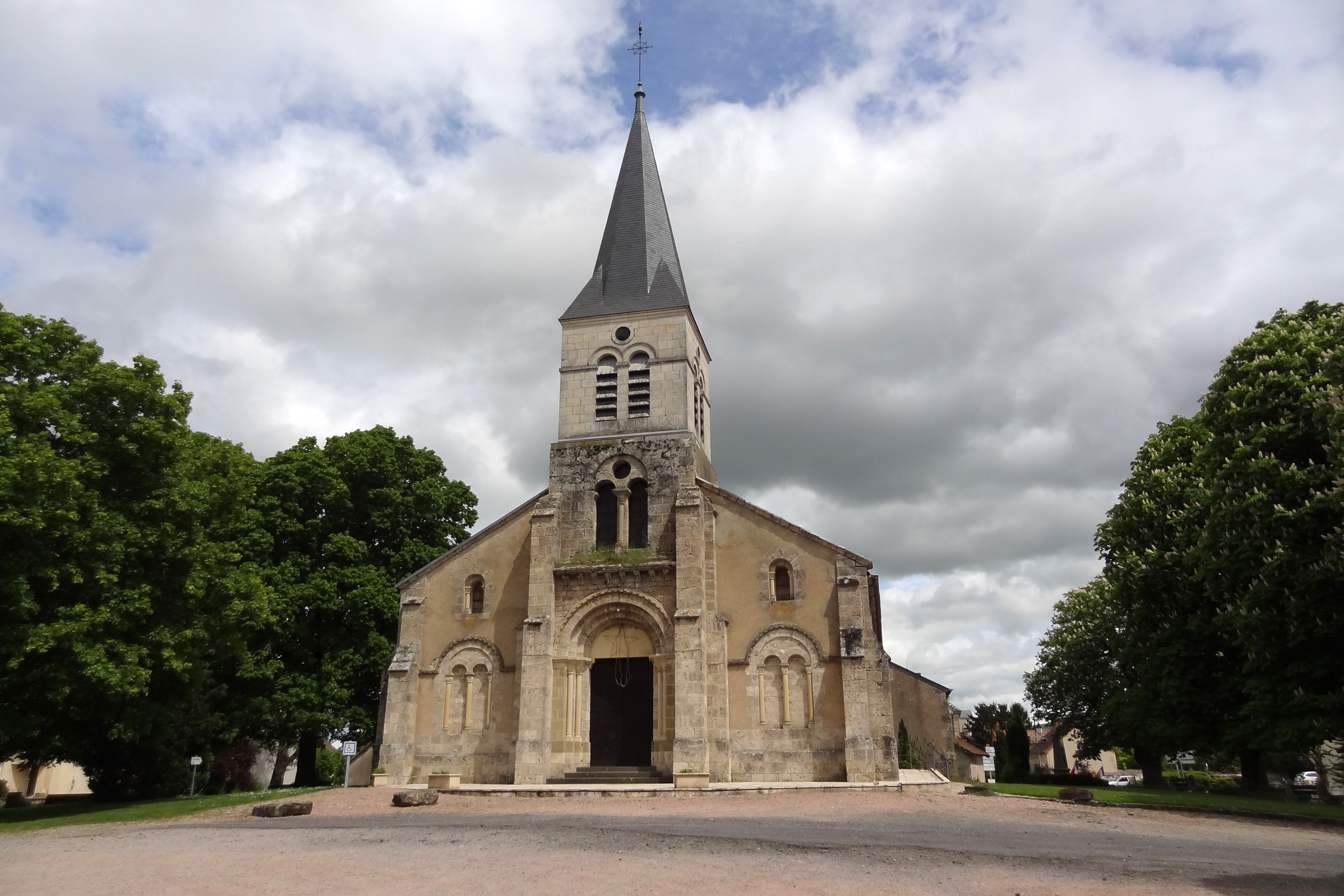
- The church in Boucé
- Location of Boucé
- Location within France Location within Auvergne-Rhône-Alpes
- Coordinates: 46°19′07″N 3°29′38″E
- Country: France
- Region: Auvergne-Rhône-Alpes
- Department: Allier
- Arrondissement: Vichy
- Canton: Saint-Pourçain-sur-Sioule

Government
  - Mayor (2026–32): Richard Ressot
- Area^{1}: 21.68 km^{2} (8.37 sq mi)
- Elevation: 265 m (869 ft)
- Highest elevation: 310 m (1,020 ft)
- Lowest elevation: 246 m (807 ft)
- Population (2023): 507
  - Density: 23.4/km^{2} (60.6/sq mi)
- Time zone: UTC+01:00 (CET)
  - Summer (DST): UTC+02:00 (CEST)
- INSEE/Postal code: 03034 /03150
- ^{1} French Land Register data, which excludes lakes, ponds, glaciers > 1 km^{2} (0.386 sq mi or 247 acres) and river estuaries.

Boucé (French pronunciation: [buse]; Occitan: Bocèc) is a commune in the Allier department in central France.

== Population ==
Historical population
Year	Pop.	±% p.a.
1968	650	—
1975	602	−1.09%
1982	575	−0.65%
1990	532	−0.97%
1999	512	−0.42%
2007	551	+0.92%
2012	535	−0.59%
2017	508	−1.03%
2023	507	−0.03%
Source: INSEE

== See also ==
- Communes of the Allier department
