= Varennes-sur-Allier =

- Commune
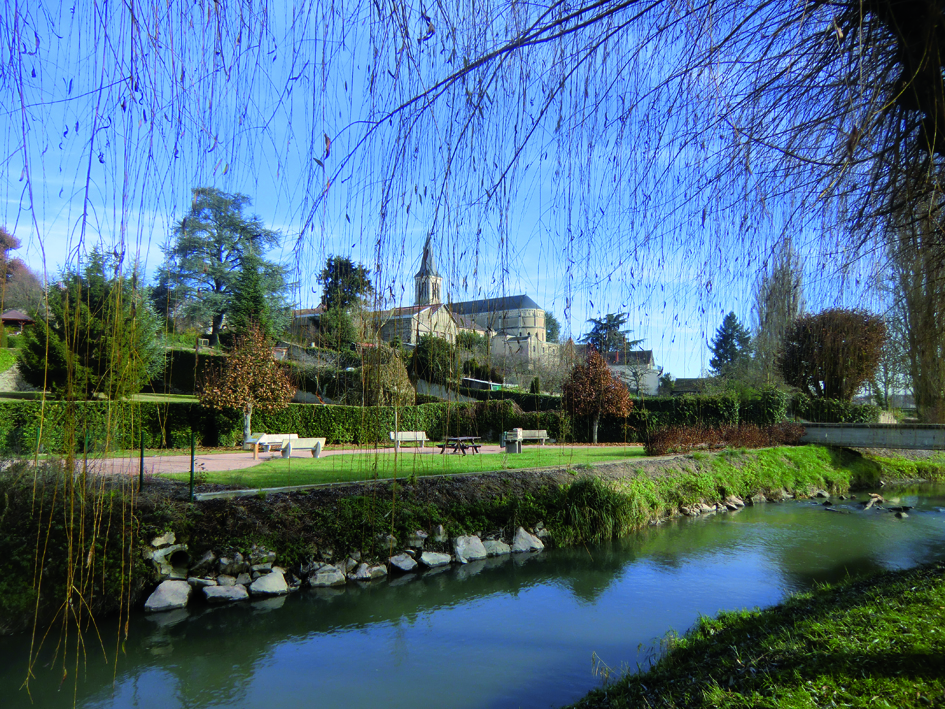
- A view within Varennes-sur-Allier

- Coat of arms
- Location of Varennes-sur-Allier
- Location within France Location within Auvergne-Rhône-Alpes
- Coordinates: 46°18′47″N 3°24′08″E
- Country: France
- Region: Auvergne-Rhône-Alpes
- Department: Allier
- Arrondissement: Vichy
- Canton: Saint-Pourçain-sur-Sioule
- Intercommunality: Entr'Allier Besbre et Loire

Government
  - Mayor (2026–32): Jean-Noël Monier
- Area^{1}: 24.1 km^{2} (9.3 sq mi)
- Elevation: 248 m (814 ft)
- Highest elevation: 292 m (958 ft)
- Lowest elevation: 228 m (748 ft)
- Population (2023): 3,549
  - Density: 147/km^{2} (381/sq mi)
- Time zone: UTC+01:00 (CET)
  - Summer (DST): UTC+02:00 (CEST)
- INSEE/Postal code: 03298 /03150
- ^{1} French Land Register data, which excludes lakes, ponds, glaciers > 1 km^{2} (0.386 sq mi or 247 acres) and river estuaries.

Varennes-sur-Allier (French pronunciation: [vaʁɛn syʁ alje], literally Varennes on Allier; Occitan: Varenas) is a commune in the Allier department in Auvergne-Rhône-Alpes in central France.

The commune is listed as a Village étape.

== History ==
=== Celtic settlement ===
From the 4th century BC, a Celtic settlement existed in Varennes-sur-Allier.

=== Gallic wars ===
In 52 BC during the Gallic Wars lived by Julius Caesar, Vercingetorix crossed the river Elave (moderne Loire), and started marching up and down the banks of the river Loire, mirroring Caesar's movements and destroying all the bridges to keep him from crossing, the purpose presumably being to destroy part of his force as he attempted to cross. Realizing Vercingetorix's plan, Caesar resolved to trick him and cross under his very nose.

Caesar one night camped near the town of Varennes, where there had previously been a bridge before Vercingetorix had destroyed it. That night, he divided his force into two parts, one part being 2/3 of the force, the other being 1/3 of the force. He ordered the larger force to march in 6 corps, as if it were in fact the full corps. He then ordered it to continue its march south. Vercingetorix, duped, took the bait and followed this part of the force.

Caesar, with the two legions still present at Varennes, speedily rebuilt the bridge that had been present there. He then sent for the other force, which during that next day stole a march on Vercingetorix, and completed a junction with the original force, and crossed the rebuilt bridge. Realizing that he had been duped, Vercingetorix set out south, to beat Caesar to Gergovia.

== Population ==
Historical population
Year	Pop.	±% p.a.
1968	4,712	—
1975	4,907	+0.58%
1982	4,751	−0.46%
1990	4,413	−0.92%
1999	4,072	−0.89%
2007	3,814	−0.81%
2012	3,542	−1.47%
2017	3,561	+0.11%
2023	3,549	−0.06%
Source: INSEE

== See also ==
- Communes of the Allier department
- List of medieval bridges in France
