= Marcenat, Cantal =

Commune in Auvergne-Rhône-Alpes, France

Marcenat
- Commune
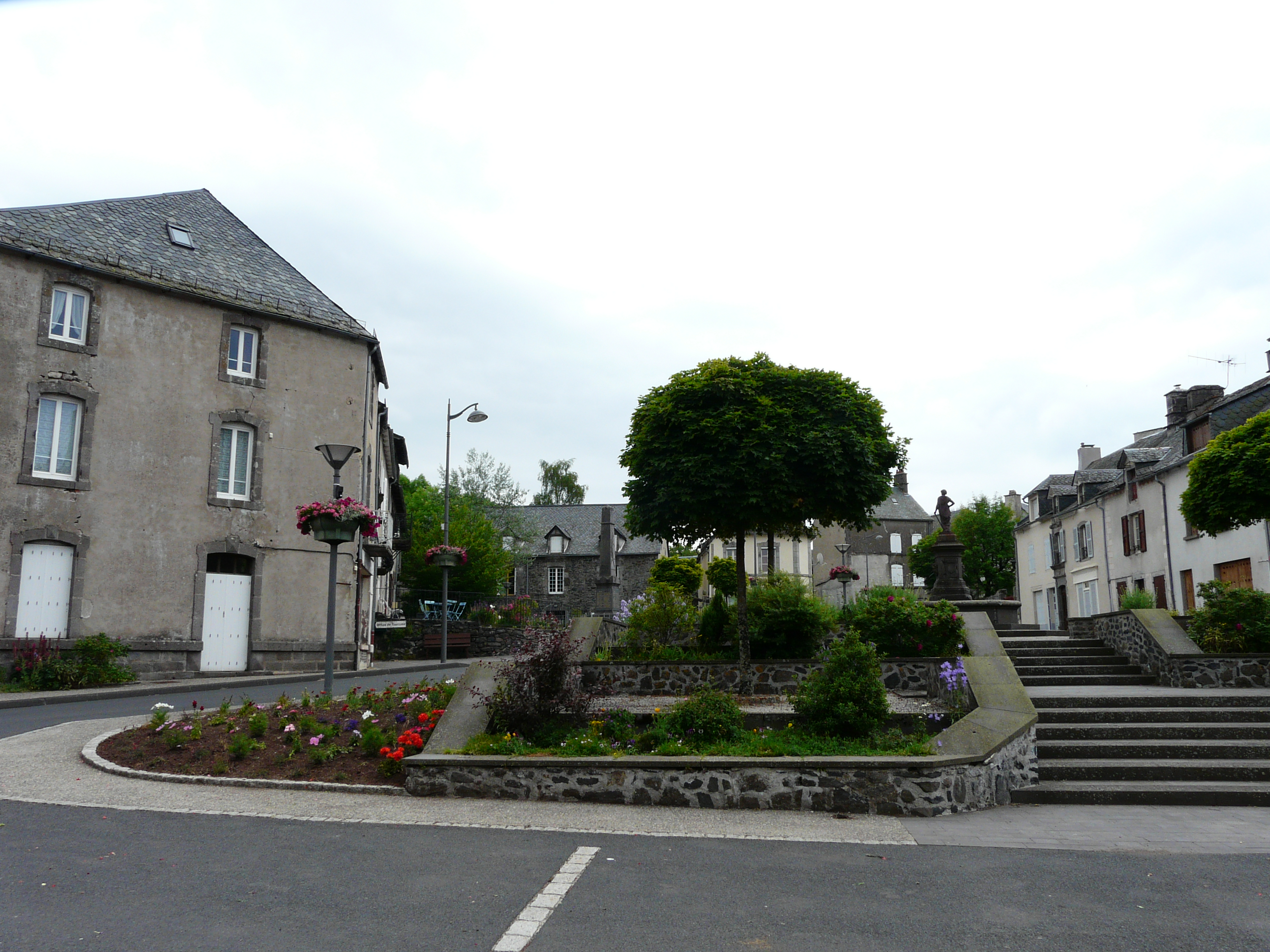
- The square in Marcenat

- Coat of arms
- Location of Marcenat
- Location within France Location within Auvergne-Rhône-Alpes
- Coordinates: 45°18′28″N 2°49′39″E
- Country: France
- Region: Auvergne-Rhône-Alpes
- Department: Cantal
- Arrondissement: Saint-Flour
- Canton: Riom-ès-Montagnes

Government
  - Mayor (2020–2026): Colette Ponchet-Passemard
- Area^{1}: 51.47 km^{2} (19.87 sq mi)
- Elevation: 1,060 m (3,480 ft)
- Highest elevation: 1,449 m (4,754 ft)
- Lowest elevation: 760 m (2,490 ft)
- Population (2023): 508
  - Density: 9.87/km^{2} (25.6/sq mi)
- Time zone: UTC+01:00 (CET)
  - Summer (DST): UTC+02:00 (CEST)
- INSEE/Postal code: 15114 /15190
- ^{1} French Land Register data, which excludes lakes, ponds, glaciers > 1 km^{2} (0.386 sq mi or 247 acres) and river estuaries.

Marcenat is a commune in the département of Cantal and Auvergne-Rhône-Alpes region in south-central France.

== Population ==
Historical population
Year	Pop.	±% p.a.
1968	1,218	—
1975	1,100	−1.45%
1982	928	−2.40%
1990	823	−1.49%
1999	627	−2.98%
2007	542	−1.80%
2012	509	−1.25%
2017	515	+0.23%
2023	508	−0.23%
Source: INSEE

== Sights ==
- The Château d'Aubijou, which belonged to the Castellane family.
- Orthodox monastery Russian architecture.

== Climate ==
Climate data for Marcenat (1991–2020 averages)
Month	Jan	Feb	Mar	Apr	May	Jun	Jul	Aug	Sep	Oct	Nov	Dec	Year
Record high °C (°F)	18.7 (65.7)	20.8 (69.4)	21.8 (71.2)	25.2 (77.4)	28.4 (83.1)	33.6 (92.5)	34.1 (93.4)	35.3 (95.5)	30.7 (87.3)	28.3 (82.9)	20.8 (69.4)	18.0 (64.4)	35.3 (95.5)
Mean daily maximum °C (°F)	3.8 (38.8)	4.4 (39.9)	8.0 (46.4)	10.9 (51.6)	15.0 (59.0)	18.9 (66.0)	21.3 (70.3)	21.4 (70.5)	17.2 (63.0)	13.0 (55.4)	7.5 (45.5)	4.8 (40.6)	12.2 (54.0)
Daily mean °C (°F)	0.5 (32.9)	0.6 (33.1)	3.7 (38.7)	6.2 (43.2)	10.1 (50.2)	13.7 (56.7)	15.7 (60.3)	15.7 (60.3)	12.1 (53.8)	8.8 (47.8)	4.1 (39.4)	1.5 (34.7)	7.7 (45.9)
Mean daily minimum °C (°F)	−2.8 (27.0)	−3.2 (26.2)	−0.5 (31.1)	1.5 (34.7)	5.2 (41.4)	8.4 (47.1)	10.1 (50.2)	10.1 (50.2)	7.0 (44.6)	4.6 (40.3)	0.7 (33.3)	−1.8 (28.8)	3.3 (37.9)
Record low °C (°F)	−16.3 (2.7)	−19.9 (−3.8)	−20.5 (−4.9)	−10.4 (13.3)	−3.6 (25.5)	−0.7 (30.7)	1.2 (34.2)	1.5 (34.7)	−1.9 (28.6)	−9.3 (15.3)	−13.8 (7.2)	−17.9 (−0.2)	−20.5 (−4.9)
Average precipitation mm (inches)	89.1 (3.51)	75.7 (2.98)	82.4 (3.24)	100.4 (3.95)	108.9 (4.29)	94.8 (3.73)	95.5 (3.76)	93.2 (3.67)	106.5 (4.19)	105.1 (4.14)	115.1 (4.53)	107.8 (4.24)	1,174.5 (46.24)
Average precipitation days (≥ 1.0 mm)	12.6	11.3	11.2	12.2	12.7	10.5	10.1	10.0	10.2	12.0	13.5	13.0	139.4
Mean monthly sunshine hours	106.8	131.0	164.5	169.7	188.3	230.2	249.5	219.2	188.2	147.6	101.7	100.4	1,997
Source: Meteociel

== See also ==
- Communes of the Cantal department
