= Pierre Culot =

Belgian sculptor and ceramist

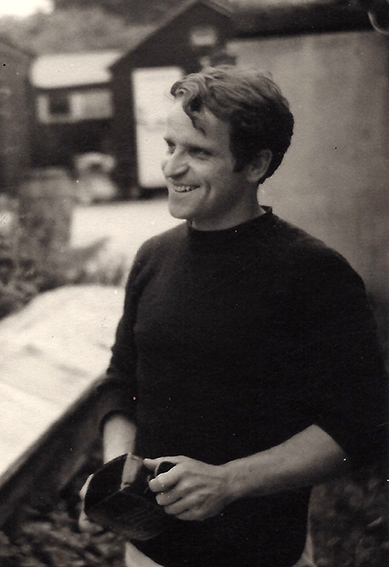
- Pierre Culot in 1958 at Bernard Leach's studio in St Ives
- Born: 12 January 1938
- Died: 9 March 2011 (aged 73); Roux-Miroir, Belgium
- Known for: Sculpture, ceramics
- Website: www.atelierpierreculot.com

Pierre Culot (12 January 1938 – 9 March 2011) was a Belgian sculptor and ceramicist.

== Biography ==
=== Education ===
Born into a family of teachers, Pierre Culot grew up in Namur. From his adolescence, he was attracted to the world of art and antiquity. In 1954, he joined the School of Artistic Crafts at Maredsous Abbey, where he studied ceramic art under Richard Owczarek. At weekends, he would visit the workshop of painter Yvonne Perin (1905–1967) in Namur, where he mixed with other artists and intellectuals. He left the school in Maredsous in 1957. He then went to study as an apprentice with Belgian ceramicist Antoine de Vinck and perfect his technical training. During his training, he discovered the Ratilly stoneware style, introduced to him by French ceramicists Jeanne Pierlot and Norbert Pierlot. He later met Jacqueline Lerat, Yves Mohy, Pierre Digan, Elisabeth Joulia and Robert Deblander. In 1958, he joined the La Cambre National School of Visual Arts in Brussels and attended the workshop of sculptor Charles Leplae. There, he met a whole generation of future artists, including illustrator Miche Wynants (born in 1934 in Louvain), whom he later married. He visited other artist's workshops that year, including that of Pierre Caille, and also convinced the English master potter Bernard Leach to host him at his workshop in Cornwall. His stay proved to be highly beneficial—he spent time among other apprentices and potters, some of whom went on to shape the art of ceramics in the second half of the 20th century, such as Michael Cardew or Gwyn Hanssen-Pigott.

=== Trips abroad ===
From 1959 to 1961, Pierre Culot carried out compulsory military service. He was posted to the Congo while the country sought independence, and discovered local ceramics during his time there. In 1963, Pierre et Miche went on their honeymoon. The couple passed through the Alps and Brindisi, and down through Italy to end up in Greece. They took also took advantage of the opportunity to visit painter and engraver Giorgio Morandi at his workshop during the trip. Pierre Culot later travelled to various European countries as well as spending time in Japan, where he met ceramicist Shoji Hamada in 1973. Hamada was linked to the Mingei movement, which would influence all of Culot's ceramic works. He returned to Japan for a second trip in 1974. In 1976, he travelled to India and discovered Chandigarh, a city that is home to countless architectural creations by Le Corbusier, Pierre Jeanneret and Matthew Nowicki. In 1988, Pierre Culot went to Yemen with a group of French architects. This trip cultivated his reflections on sculpture. The architecture in the cities of Al-Hudaydah, Sanaa and Taiz that he visited would inspire his ceramics and sculptures to take on new shapes, such as columns and walls built from brick and stoneware tiles.

=== Artistic life ===
==== Pierre Culot: Contemporary ceramicist ====
In 1962, Pierre Culot set up a workshop on the rue du Luxembourg in Brussels. He hosted artists at his workshop, including Lison Guerry-Verdet (1938–2001). He was frequently supported by Mr et Mrs Baucher-Féron, who worked in interior design and decoration and had a studio in Avenue Louise in Brussels. Culot's ceramics were regularly displayed there up to the 1980's. A year before their wedding in 1963, Culot exhibited with Miche Wynants at the Vendôme Gallery in Brussels. From 1963, Pierre Culot became affiliated with a variety of organisations that promoted Belgian artists and artisans. He has been featured in two successive editions of the Brabant Métiers d'Art directory. 1964 marked the start of a promising career: In Paris, Pierre Culot exhibited at the Robert Delpire Gallery. In London, his ceramics were hosted by the Primavera Gallery, which championed creations by Hans Coper, Lucie Rie, Bernard Leach and Michael Cardew at the time. In 1967, he entered the International Contemporary Ceramic Art Competition, organised by the Museum of Ceramics in Faenza, and was awarded the Ministry of Foreign Trade prize for his clay vases.

==== Pierre Culot: Potter ====
"More important to me than any award, is that my friends think of me each morning when they drink from my bowls" Pierre Culot affirmed. Throughout his life, as a potter, Pierre Culot worked with stoneware clay. The practice of turning pottery at the wheel was of great importance to him. It was through this practice that he made bowls, objects that constituted, for him, the fundamental and instantaneous architecture that prepared him to conquer space in sculpture: "The bowl is something of a primitive form, with its resemblance to the shape of a shell, it is the ultimate structure. Held between two hands, it presents an offering—the bowl is an extension of the hand. It is the hand that guides the eye and not the contrary." For the stoneware glazes that he developed from his own research and formulas, he fired his ceramics in electric ovens at temperatures up to 1,280 °C (2,340 °F). Pierre Culot's "mixed pots" blur the boundaries between pottery and sculpture. Formed using plaques, these vases were made up of two to four different materials, creating a visible "fragmentation of volume".

==== Pierre Culot: Sculptor-architect, sculptor-landscaper, sculptor-ceramicist ====
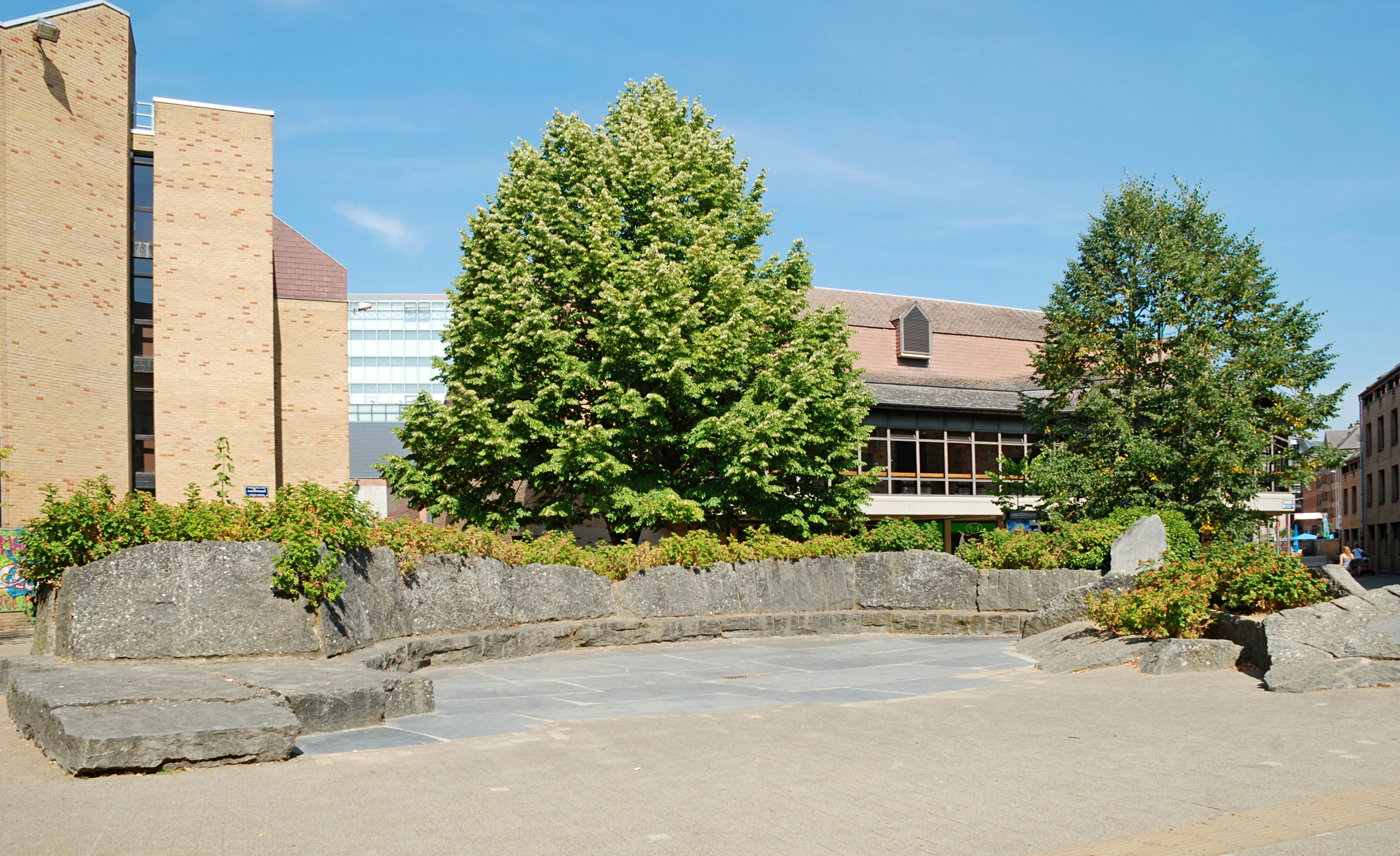
Ronde des menhirs (Place Montesquieu, Louvain-la-Neuve)

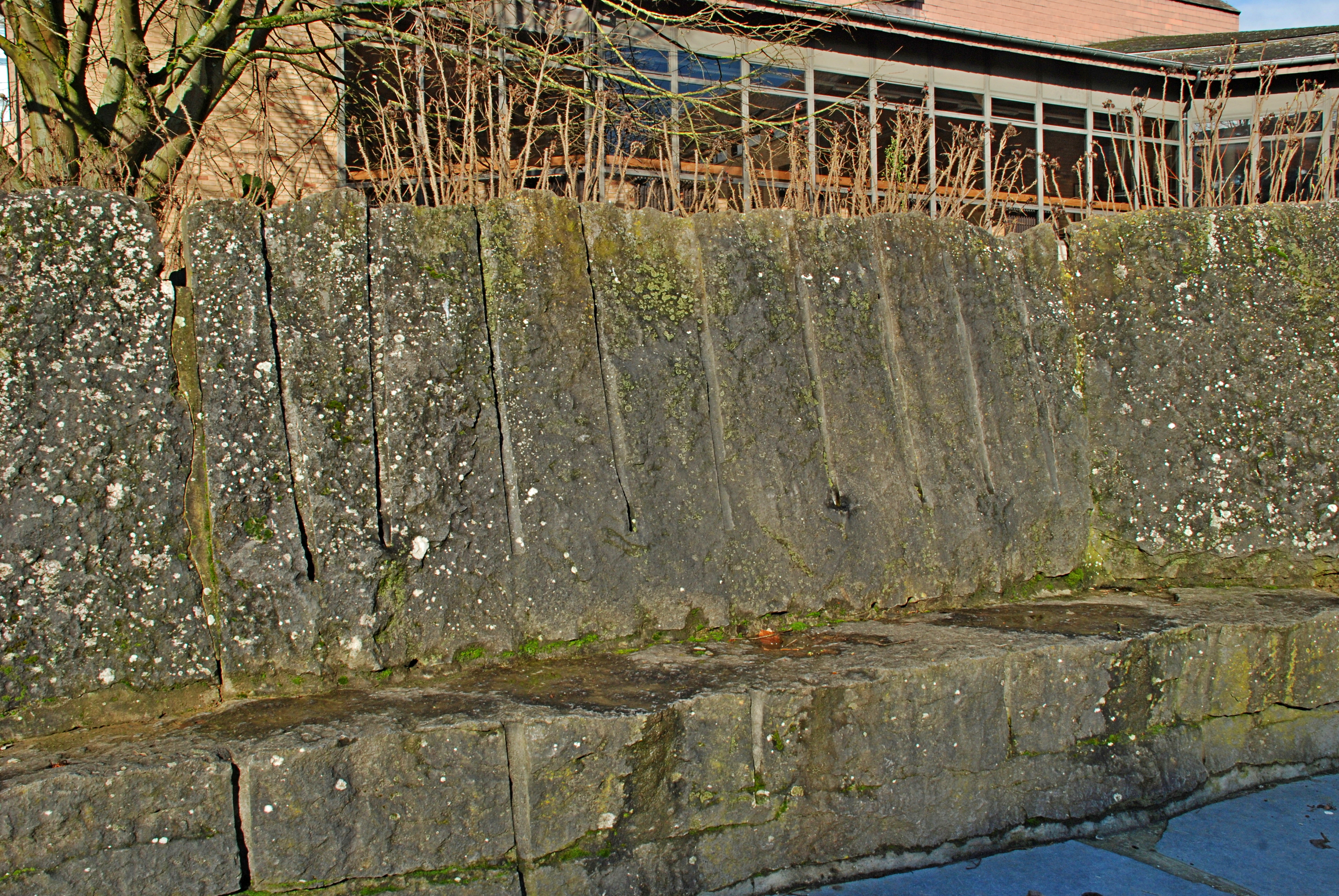
Ronde des menhirs (detail)

Pierre Culot was interested in sculpture throughout his career and became deeply dedicated to the craft as the years went by. Everything in his work relates to it, without being defined as such. "Pierre Culot, sculptor, architect, gardener or artist?" as questioned by Maurice Culot in the monograph "Jardins-sculptures, sculptures-jardins." Referring to the foreword to "Jardins enchantés, un romancero" by Ferdinand Bac (1925), the answer that the author gives could not be more fitting for Pierre Culot: "By being a gardener and geometrician from time to time, I have faced blame, which I accept in all its rigor. Perhaps I saw in that a way to restore the links with methods formerly used by artisans who felt enough childlike love in their hearts to love the universe and practice as many crafts as they pleased." In the 1960's, Pierre Culot received several commissions for "living walls". In 1965, he produced openwork panels and stoneware tiles, demonstrating an interest in the architectural arrangement of ceramic objects. The year after, he was requested to design an openwork wall for a conference room at the Tour du Midi in Brussels. In that same year, Pierre Culot also received a request from the University of Liège to devise a wall at the Sart Tilman Open Air Museum. He carried out this œuvre, which was halfway between sculpture and architecture, in collaboration with architects Claude Strebelle and Pierre Humblet in 1967. In 1988, inspired by his trip to Yemen, Pierre Culot began creating sculptures that he called "Architectures en terre" from a combination of stoneware and brick, held together by mortar—following a technique that he observed on his travels . These sculptures took the form of walls, pillars or steles. From 1993, he started on a new series of works that he referred to as "steles" and "capitals". These constituted pieces of stoneware moulded with imprints of varying depths in horizontal or diagonal lines. This resulted in a pleat-like effect, evocative of the wings and the clothing of the Victoire de Samothrace statue. Culot dedicated several exhibitions to these creations, notably one at the Stedelijk museum in Amsterdam in 1995. Pierre Culot's sculptures cannot be appreciated and understood for their true value without comprehension of their anchorage in place, their roots, and their space and elevation within an environment. His sculptures convey, to quote Claude Lorent,"an attitude towards life, that is at once humble et participative, determined and inventive, the aim of which would be to propose a long-lasting and unprecedented union between being and nature, through the intervention of art considered to be a cerebral and spiritual path and continuous trial".

==== Approaches to other materials (wood, brick, stone, metal) ====
Throughout his life, Pierre Culot was interested in materials besides stoneware, particularly in terms of creating sculptures with wood. In 1973, one of his wood sculptures won the "Young Belgian sculptor" competition. Pierre Culot also created numerous models, made using a combination of wood, stone and clay. He discovered the work of sculptor Eduardo Chillida in 1969 during a retrospective in Zürich, which would go on to have a considerable impact on him. His interest in materials led him to devise an exhibition on recycling in 2004 at the Tournay-Solvay park in Watermael-Boitsfort, which featured sculptures made of metal, corrugated iron, wood and stone.

==== Interest in design: Tables, chairs and lamps ====
From the 1960s, Pierre Culot developed an interest in interior design. Everyday objects and furniture appealed to him. In 1974, he built his first coffee table using Belgian Bluestone from Hainaut. He also sketched other models of tables and different furniture (designed with different types of stone and in wood). At the beginning of the 1980's, he set about making a prototype of a lamp with a triangular base made from a plaster mold, which meant it could be mass-produced. He created three molds of different heights from this one model and decided to make it available either with or without enamelling. He also designed wall lamps based on the same principle. Throughout his career, he continued to produce openwork panels, situated at the intersection of mural sculpture and design.

==== International recognition ====
Pierre Culot received international recognition early in his career. In 1964, the National Museum of Modern Art in Tokyo acquired one of his ceramic pieces. In 1974, the Victoria and Albert Museum in London hosted his works for a solo exhibition. Three years earlier in 1971, the Stedelijk Museum in Amsterdam held a dedicated exhibition on Pierre Culot's work and repeated the event from 1994 to 1995. Throughout his career, Pierre Culot saw his work exhibited in many different galleries and museums in France, Switzerland, Luxemburg and the Netherlands, as well as outside of Europe in Turkey (1972), Canada (1973) and Thailand in (2001). Museums that have exhibited the work of Pierre Culot include, the National Ceramics Museum in Sèvres, the Museum of Design and the Bellerive Museum in Zürich, the Museum of Contemporary Design and Applied Arts in Lausanne, the Royal Museums of Art and History in Brussels and the Newark Museum in New Jersey, USA.

==== Later years ====
In 2005, Pierre Culot was the victim of an attack. His condition left him unable to work for two years. In the workshop in Roux-Miroir, his collaborators continue their activities and sculptural projects and exhibitions go on. Pierre Culot died in Roux-Miroir on March 9, 2011.

== Significant locations ==
=== Roux-Miroir ===
==== Home ====
Pierre Culot and Miche Wynants married in 1963. They bought an abandoned farm in Roux-Miroir, in the province of Brabant Wallon. Their daughter Charlotte Culot was born in 1964 and went on to become a painter. In 1965, Eléonore Culot, was born but unfortunately died prematurely. In 1967, their son Joseph Culot was born, who was later responsible for the revival of activities at the Roux-Miroir workshops in 2015. From 1964, their home and workshop became a visible extension of their universe, thanks in part to the contribution of interior designer Louis Daliers to renovating the old farm.

==== Garden ====
Surrounding the farm was originally a piece of land just waiting to become a landscape. From there emerged the Roux-Miroir garden. Over the years, plants, trees and sculptures by Pierre Culot found their place in the garden, arranged in a peaceful, natural and subtly designed composition. The garden at Roux-Miroir is a testimony to the importance of sculpture in the artistic life of Pierre Culot.

=== Eppe-Sauvage (1991–2007) ===
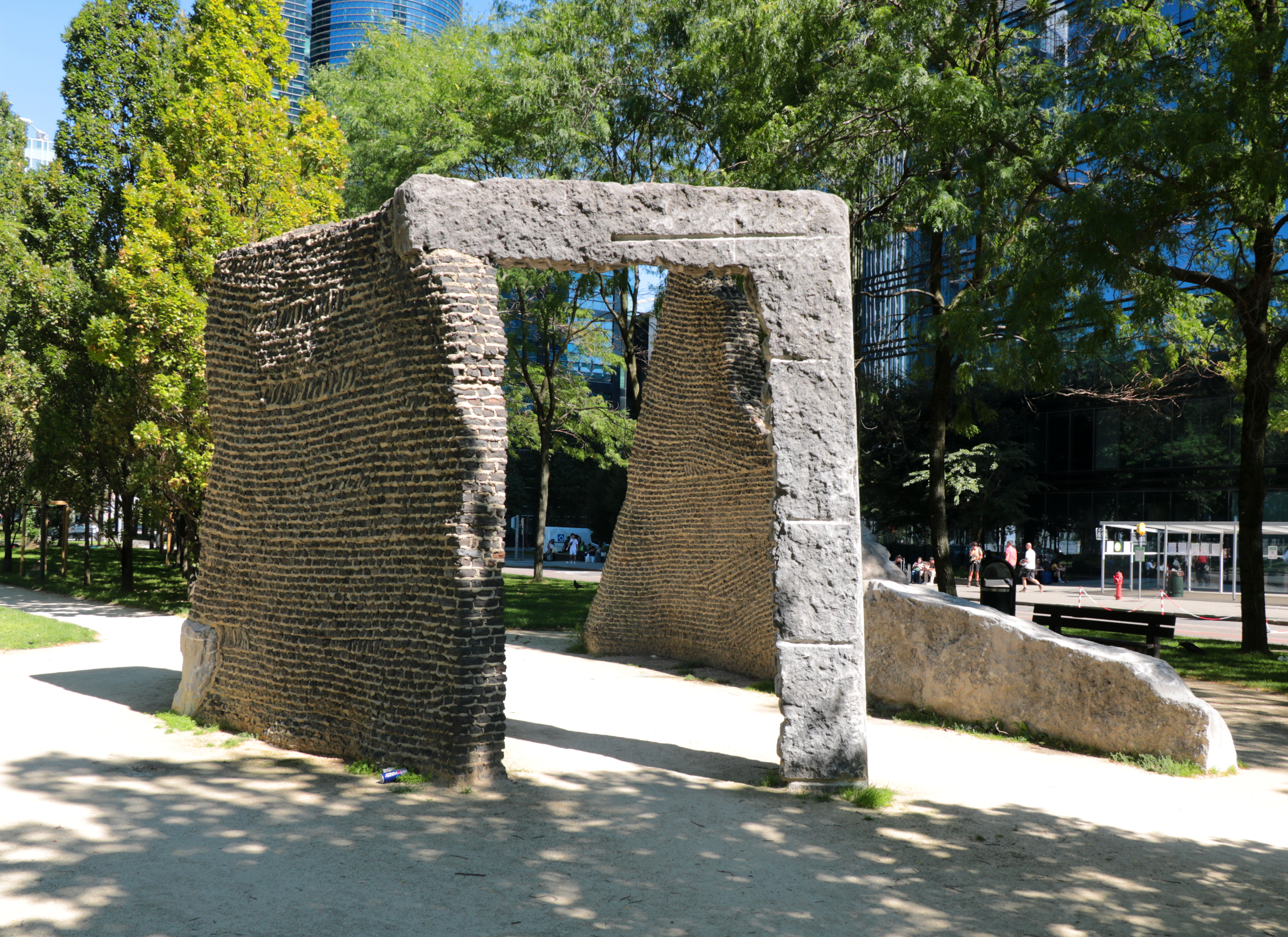
L'Arche (1997), Brussels

As time went by, Roux-Miroir turned out to be too small for Pierre Culot's monumental oeuvres. In 1991, Pierre Culot bought a 30-hectare estate in Eppe-Sauvage in northern France. There, in the heart of Avesnes-sur-Helpe, an area known as Avesnois, he brought to life immense sculptures in brick and granite, that he called "Arches". Weighing several dozen tonnes, constructing them required impressive methods. In 1997, one of these archways was erected on the boulevard du Roi Albert II in Brussels. Others took up residence in various private gardens, largely in France and Belgium.

== Collaborations and handover ==
=== Collaborations ===
Throughout his career, Pierre Culot received support from artist collaborations, notably with René Bosman (1921–2015), Thiébaut Chagué (1958) et Pascal Slootmakers (1966), all of whom left their mark on his workshop. They participated in the creation and development of utilitarian ceramics made from plaster molds, allowing series to be produced indefinitely.

=== Collections ===
During their travels and visits, Miche et Pierre Culot collected ceramics from diverse origins and time periods. On several occasions, Pierre Culot presented pieces from this collection alongside his own works. Constituting an important cultural heritage, an inventory of his collection was initiated in 2016.

== Revival in 2016 ==
Joseph Culot relaunched activities at Roux-Miroir with the support of a long-term collaborator of Pierre Culot, Pascal Slootmakers, his own childhood friend Arnaud Van Schevensteen, and artistic director Dimitri Jeurissen. Today, the Atelier Pierre Culot has several functions, including continuing the production of certain pieces based on original models, classifying and conserving the artist's archives and collections, collaborating with brands on specific projects, as well as hosting artist residencies for emerging talents. In 2020, Dimitri Jeurissen and Arnaud Van Schevensteen took a step back from their roles. Joseph Culot continues with the production of ceramics, lamps, tables and openwork panels—focusing on sorting the archives in order to carry out a monograph of the work of Pierre Culot, as well as spending time on putting together an inventory of his collection of ceramics.

== Timeline (major exhibitions and achievements) ==
1962	Exhibition with Miche Wynants (illustrator), at the Galerie Vendôme, Brussels
1964	Exhibition at the Robert Delpire Gallery, Paris
1964	Exhibition at the Baucher-Feron Gallery, Brussels
1964	Exhibition at the Primavera Gallery, London
1964	Acquisition of a ceramic piece by the National Museum of Modern Art, Tokyo
1965	Acquisition of a work by the Kunstgewerbemuseum (known since 2017 as the Museum für Gestaltung, or Museum of Design) Zurich
1965	Participation in the exhibition on international contemporary ceramics at the Cantini Museum, Marseille
1966	Exhibition at the Teo Jakob Gallery, Geneva
1966	Creation of an openwork wall for the Tour du Midi, Brussels
1967	Won the Ministry of Foreign Trade prize at the International Contemporary Ceramic Art Competition held by the Museum of Ceramic Art in Faenza
1967	In collaboration with architects Claude Strebelle and Pierre Humblet, creation of a wall for the University of Liège, in Sart Tilman
1967	Creation of a wall for the Hilton Hotel, Brussels
1968	Won the Chambre syndicale des céramistes et ateliers d'art prize, at the International Biennale of Ceramic Art, Vallauris
1969-1970	Creation of a sculpture wall in wood at the Romi Goldmuntz Centre, Antwerp
1969-1970	Exhibition of "mixed stoneware", at the Baucher-Feron Gallery, Brussels
1969-1970	Creation of the entrance hall for the head office and a concrete wall in the garden of the Banque du Crédit Communal on the boulevard Pacheco, Brussels
1971	Solo exhibition at the Stedelijk Museum of Dordrecht, Netherlands
1971	Solo exhibition at the Stedelijk Museum, Amsterdam
1971	Elected member for life of the l'Académie Internationale de la Céramique (AIC), Switzerland
1971	Exhibition at the Robert Delpire Gallery, Paris
1971	Won the gold medal in the International Contemporary Ceramic Art Competition in Faenza
1972	Creation of limited-edition ceramics for the French car manufacturer Citroën
1972	Exhibition at the Centrum de Vaart, in Hilversum (Netherlands) and Ankara (Turkey)
1972	Won the Koopal prize for sculpture, awarded by the Belgian government, Brussels
1973	Collective exhibition with Jean et Jacqueline Lerat, Elisabeth Joulia, Yves Mohy, Antoine de Vinck and Pierre Culot at Sars-Poteries (France)
1973	Design of a sculpture garden for the Caisse Générale d'Epargne et de Retraite (CGER), in Brussels
1973	Won the Young Belgian Sculptor prize, for a sculpture in wood, Brussels
1973	Participation in a collective exhibition in Calgary
1973	Exhibition of wooden sculptures at the Museum of Ixelles, Brussels
1973	Exhibition of "Sculptures by Pierre Culot", displaying sculptures in wood at Roux-Miroir
1974	Solo exhibition on "Ceramics by Pierre Culot" at the Victoria and Albert Museum, London
1974	Exhibition on "Ceramics by Pierre Culot" at the Créateurs et Industriel Gallery in Saint-Germain, Paris
1974	Exhibition of a sculpture at the Middelheim Open Air Sculpture Museum in Antwerp
1975	Exhibition at Jean-Charles de Castelbajac, Paris
1975	Acquisition of ceramics by the National Ceramics Museum in Sèvres, the Victoria and Albert Museum in London and the Stedelijk Museum in Amsterdam
1977	Exhibition at the Nouvel Observateur Gallery in Paris
1977	Exhibition on "Ceramics by Pierre Culot" at the Banque Bruxelles Lambert (BBL) in Wavre, Belgium
1979	Exhibition on "Antoine de Vinck and Pierre Culot" at the Baucher-Féron Gallery in Brussels
1979	Exhibition at the workshop in Roux-Miroir with the support of René Bosman (1921–2015) and apprentice Thiébaut Chagué (France–1958)
1979	Exhibition at the Carmes Gallery, Wavre
1980	Exhibition on "Arts, sciences et techniques" at the Musée L in Louvain-la-Neuve
1980	Exhibition at the Ecart international Gallery in Paris
1980	Exhibition on "Stone throughout the ages" at the Sart Tilman Open Air Museum, Liège
1981	Exhibition on "Drei Keramiker aus Belgien", displaying ceramics by Pierre Culot and from his collection (Antoine De Vinck, Dionysia Carmen Janssens, Shōji Hamada), at the Bellerive Museum in Zurich
1981	Exhibition at the Hetjens Museum, Düsseldorf
1981	Exhibition on "Pierre Culot, keramische Vormen" at the Het Kapelhuis Gallery, Amersfoort
1981	Exhibition on "Pierre Culot" at the Prévoté Gallery in Aix-en-Provence
1981	Creation of the Place Montesquieu in Louvain-la-Neuve
1981	Exhibition at Roux-Miroir
1982	Exhibition at the Ecart international Gallery, Paris
1982	Project on pillars and pyramids for the terrace at the Fridericianum museum, at the documenta 7 exhibition, in Kassel, Germany
1983	Creation of a stone sculpture of a book for the entrance of the Bibliotheca Wittockiana museum and library in Brussels
1983	Exhibition at Ligne 12 Gallery in Brussels
1983	Exhibition at Galuchat Gallery in Brussels
1983	Exhibition on "Pierre Culot" at Arboretum Kalmthout botanical gardens
1984	Creation of a garden for André Rousselet, Paris
1984	Exhibition "Sacrée terre" with ceramics by Hamada, Leach, Coper, DeVinck at the Maison de la Culture in Amiens
1985	Exhibition on "the ceramics of Pierre Culot" at Liberty London
1985	Exhibition on "Ceramics by Pierre Culot" at the Maison de la culture in Namur
1988	Exhibition "Architectures en terre" at Roux-Miroir
1988	Exhibition "Serres et folies" at the Triglyphe Gallery in Brussels
1989	Construction of a sculpture space on the Boulevard Bischoffsheim, Brussels
1989	Design of the entranceway for the Tractebel company in Brussels
1989	Exhibition at the Centre national de la photographie, Paris
1990	Solo exhibition on "Architectures en terre" at the Palais de Tokyo contemporary art centre in Paris
1990	Creation of a garden for the sugar factory known as the Raffinerie Tirlemontoise, in Tienen
1991	Exhibition at the Monochrome Gallery in Brussels
1991	Participation in the "Keramik als Leidenschaft" exhibition at the Bellerive Museum, Zurich
1992	Exhibition at the La Cité Gallery in Luxembourg
1992	Organisation of the "Chambre de verdure" exhibition in Roux-Miroir
1993	Exhibition at the Marquet de Vasselot Gallery in Paris
1993	Participation in the second edition of International Garden Festival in Chaumont-sur-Loire
1993	Exhibition at the Mémorial de la Vendée in Les Lucs-sur-Boulogne
1994	Solo exhibition at the Stedelijk Museum in Amsterdam
1994	Exhibition in Roux-Miroir
1995	Exhibition "Chapiteaux" at the La Cité Gallery in Luxembourg
1995	Exhibition "Jardin-sculptures, sculptures-jardin" at the Maison de l'architecture in Paris
1995	Creation of a wall for the University of Antwerp
1995	Exhibition at the open doors event for "ateliers d'artistes du Nord", Eppe-Sauvage
1996	Exhibition, at the Bibliotheca Wittockiana, Brussels
1996	Participation in a Samsung project in Korea, with architects Jean Nouvel et Rem Koolhaas (not carried out)
1996	Design of the entranceway for the Ceodeux factory in Luxembourg
1996	Creation of sculptures and gardens in Brussels for the industrial group CFE Belgium
1996	Creation of several sculptures for former flour mill Moulins de Beez in Namur
1997	Creation of a sculpture for the Paribas bank in Brussels
1997	Creation of a sculpture for the Arche de la Défense, Paris
1997	Creation of a sculpture for the sculpture garden at the Catholic University of Louvain, in Brussels
1998	Creation of an archway on the boulevard du Roi Albert II, Brussels
1999	Exhibition "jardin-sculpture, sculpture-jardin" at the Fondation pour l'architecture in Brussels
2000	Exhibition "jardin-sculpture, sculpture-jardin" at the Parc d'Egmont, Brussels
2000	Exhibition "jardin-sculpture, sculpture-jardin" at the Parc Heintz, Luxembourg City
2000	Exhibition at the First Time Gallery in Brussels
2001	Exhibition at the Ortillès-Fourcat Gallery in Paris
2002	Exhibition d'une sculpture monumentale, 4e biennale « patrimoine et création », Mons
2002	Creation of a portico, titled "Porte de la Connaissance" at the public library in Uccle
2004	Exhibition on "Recycling" at the Tournay-Solvay park in Brussels
2004	Creation of a sculpture for the Bocage de la transplantation at the Catholic University of Louvain in Woluwe-Saint-Lambert
2004	Exhibition at Roux-Miroir
2006-2007	Exhibition at Roux-Miroir
2008	Installation of a sculpture on the boulevard du Souverain in Brussels, commissioned by IBGE
2009	Exhibition at Roux-Miroir

== Bibliography ==
- Bony, Anne (2014). Pierre Culot 1938–2011 (in French). Piasa éditions. ISBN 9789462303409.
- Brancaleoni, David (2011). "Pierre Culot, potier et sculpteur". Sèvres. Revue de la Société des Amis du musée national de Céramique (20): 132–137.
- Fuchs, Rudi; Clément, Gilles; Culot, Maurice; Lorent, Claude (2000). Pierre Culot, Jardins-sculptures, Sculptures-Jardins. Skira/Seuil. ISBN 88-8118-781-7.
- Hennebert, Diane (Winter 2017–2018). "Pierre Culot: Un électron libre qui franchissait toutes les limites" (PDF). Magazine COLLECT (477): 35–37.
- Terrin, Jean-Jacques (December 1991 – January 1992). "Pierre Culot, terre cuite, pierres crues". Techniques et Architectures (399).
- Puttemans, Pierre; Hervé, Lucien (1974). Architecture moderne en Belgique (in French). Bruxelles – via Marc Vokaer éditeur.
- Amboldi, Sandra; Tolstoy, Marina; Vanmechelen, Marie-Ève (April 21, 2015). L'art dans la ville : Promenades à Woluwe-Saint-Lambert. Presses universitaires Louvain. ISBN 978-2-87558-369-7.
