= Beaurieux =

Beaurieux may refer to the following places in France:

- Beaurieux, Aisne, a commune in the department of Aisne
- Beaurieux, Nord, a commune in the department of Nord
