= Fourmies =

Fourmies may refer to:

- Canton of Fourmies, an administrative division of the Nord department, France
- Fourmies, Nord, a commune in France
- Grand Prix de Fourmies, a bicycle race held in the Fourmies, Nord, France
