= Baives =

- Commune
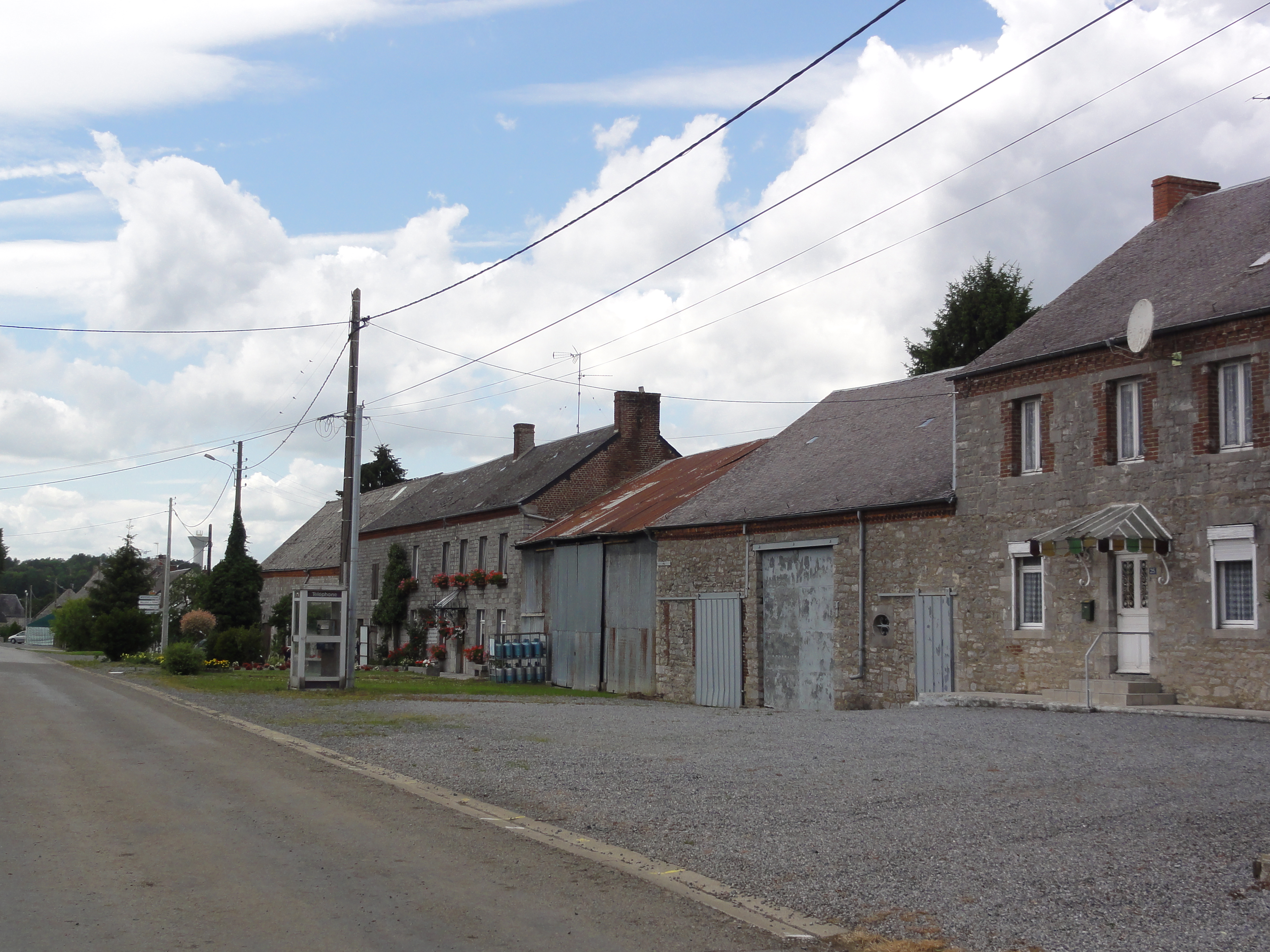
- A view within Baives

- Coat of arms
- Location of Baives
- Location within France Location within Hauts-de-France
- Coordinates: 50°03′49″N 4°12′14″E
- Country: France
- Region: Hauts-de-France
- Department: Nord
- Arrondissement: Avesnes-sur-Helpe
- Canton: Fourmies
- Intercommunality: Sud Avesnois

Government
  - Mayor (2020–2026): Claude Gary
- Area^{1}: 7.98 km^{2} (3.08 sq mi)
- Elevation: 250 m (820 ft)
- Highest elevation: 239 m (784 ft)
- Lowest elevation: 184 m (604 ft)
- Population (2023): 158
  - Density: 19.8/km^{2} (51.3/sq mi)
- Time zone: UTC+01:00 (CET)
  - Summer (DST): UTC+02:00 (CEST)
- INSEE/Postal code: 59045 /59132
- ^{1} French Land Register data, which excludes lakes, ponds, glaciers > 1 km^{2} (0.386 sq mi or 247 acres) and river estuaries.

Baives (French pronunciation: [bɛv]) is a commune in the Nord department in northern France. It is 10 km (6.2 mi) northeast of Fourmies and 25 km (16 mi) southeast of Maubeuge.

== Population ==
Historical population
Year	Pop.	±% p.a.
1968	193	—
1975	151	−3.45%
1982	123	−2.89%
1990	129	+0.60%
1999	141	+0.99%
2007	153	+1.03%
2012	160	+0.90%
2017	167	+0.86%
2023	158	−0.92%
Source: INSEE

== Heraldry ==
Arms of Baives	The arms of Baives are blazoned : Gules, 2 fesses embattled counterembattled argent, overall on a canton Gules, 3 pales vair and a chief Or. (Baives and Willies use the same arms.)

== See also ==
- Communes of the Nord department
