= Ohain =

Ohain may refer to:

- Ohain, Belgium
- Ohain, Nord, France
- Hans von Ohain (1911–1998), one of the inventors of the jet engine
