= Villers-Sire-Nicole =

- Commune
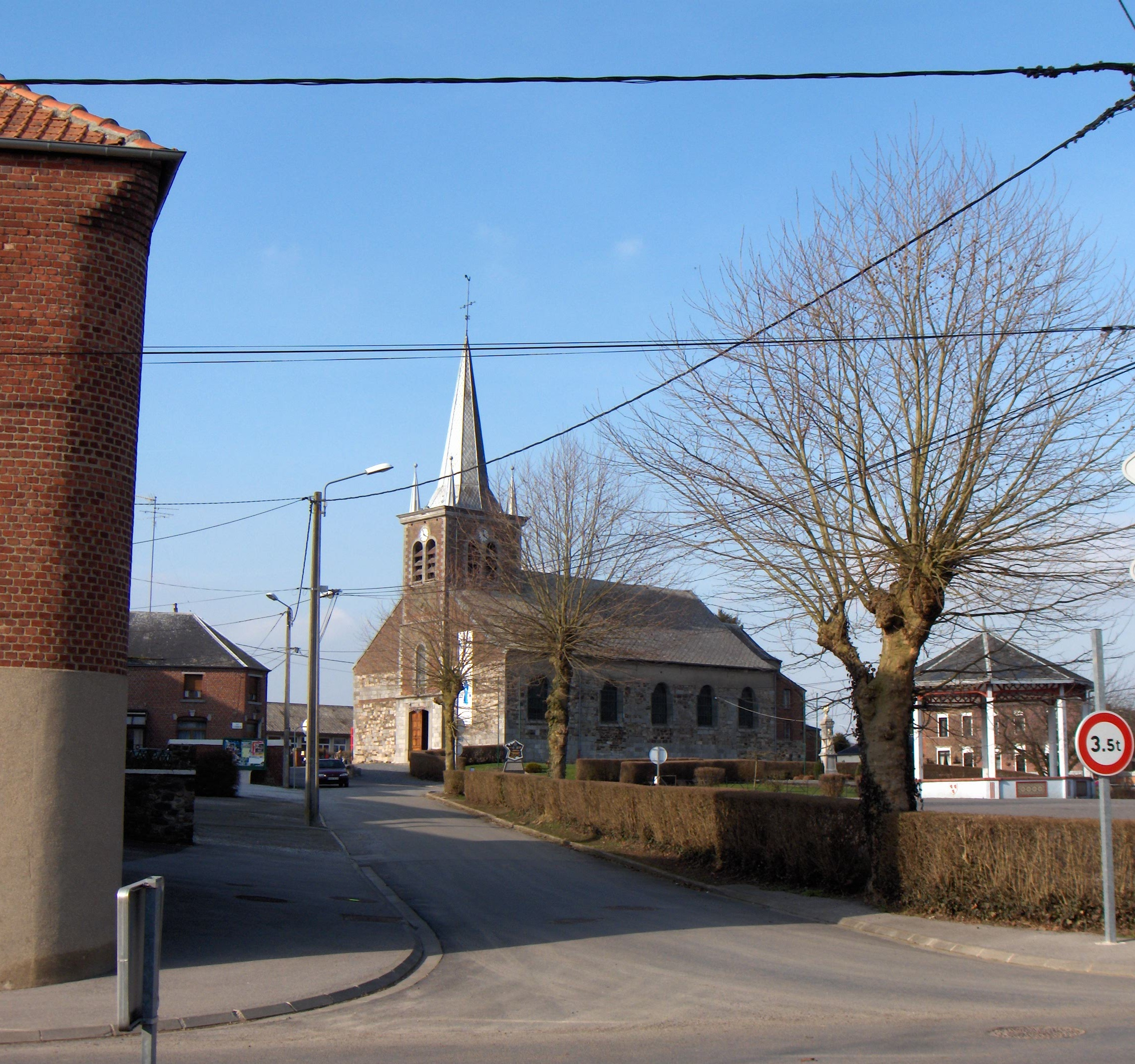
- The church in Villers-Sire-Nicole

- Coat of arms
- Location of Villers-Sire-Nicole
- Location within France Location within Hauts-de-France
- Coordinates: 50°20′27″N 4°00′58″E
- Country: France
- Region: Hauts-de-France
- Department: Nord
- Arrondissement: Avesnes-sur-Helpe
- Canton: Maubeuge
- Intercommunality: CA Maubeuge Val de Sambre

Government
  - Mayor (2020–2026): Hervé Pourbaix
- Area^{1}: 8.45 km^{2} (3.26 sq mi)
- Elevation: 100 m (330 ft)
- Highest elevation: 142 m (466 ft)
- Lowest elevation: 83 m (272 ft)
- Population (2023): 1,009
  - Density: 119/km^{2} (309/sq mi)
- Time zone: UTC+01:00 (CET)
  - Summer (DST): UTC+02:00 (CEST)
- INSEE/Postal code: 59627 /59600
- ^{1} French Land Register data, which excludes lakes, ponds, glaciers > 1 km^{2} (0.386 sq mi or 247 acres) and river estuaries.

Villers-Sire-Nicole is a commune in the Nord department in northern France.

== Heraldry ==
Arms of Villers-Sire-Nicole	The arms of Villers-Sire-Nicole are blazoned : Argent, 3 lions gules, armed, langued and crowned Or. (Eccles, Nord and Villers-Sire-Nicole use the same arms.)

== See also ==
- Communes of the Nord department
