= Eccles, Nord =

Eccles
- Commune
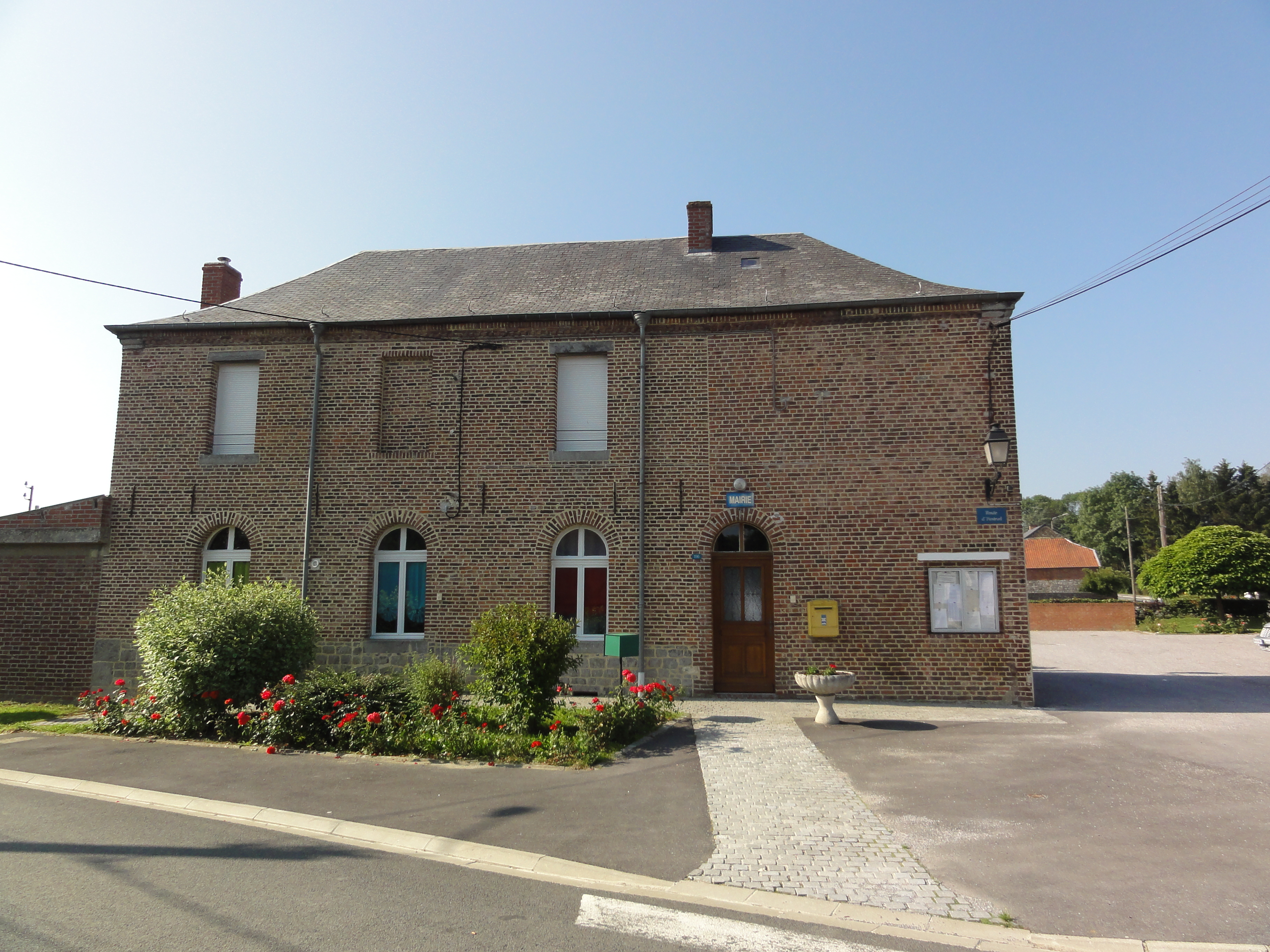
- The town hall in Eccles

- Coat of arms
- Location of Eccles
- Location within France Location within Hauts-de-France
- Coordinates: 50°12′21″N 4°06′10″E
- Country: France
- Region: Hauts-de-France
- Department: Nord
- Arrondissement: Avesnes-sur-Helpe
- Canton: Fourmies
- Intercommunality: CC Cœur de l'Avesnois

Government
  - Mayor (2022–2026): Pierre-Ange Leclercq
- Area^{1}: 3.54 km^{2} (1.37 sq mi)
- Elevation: 90 m (300 ft)
- Highest elevation: 223 m (732 ft)
- Lowest elevation: 170 m (560 ft)
- Population (2023): 94
  - Density: 27/km^{2} (69/sq mi)
- Time zone: UTC+01:00 (CET)
  - Summer (DST): UTC+02:00 (CEST)
- INSEE/Postal code: 59186 /59740
- ^{1} French Land Register data, which excludes lakes, ponds, glaciers > 1 km^{2} (0.386 sq mi or 247 acres) and river estuaries.

Eccles (French pronunciation: [ɛkl]) is a commune in the Nord department in northern France.

It is about 15 km (9.3 mi) southeast of Maubeuge.

== Heraldry ==
Arms of Eccles	The arms of Eccles are blazoned : Argent, 3 lions gules, armed, langued and crowned Or. (Eccles, Nord and Villers-Sire-Nicole use the same arms.)

== See also ==
- Communes of the Nord department
