= Rainsars =

- Commune
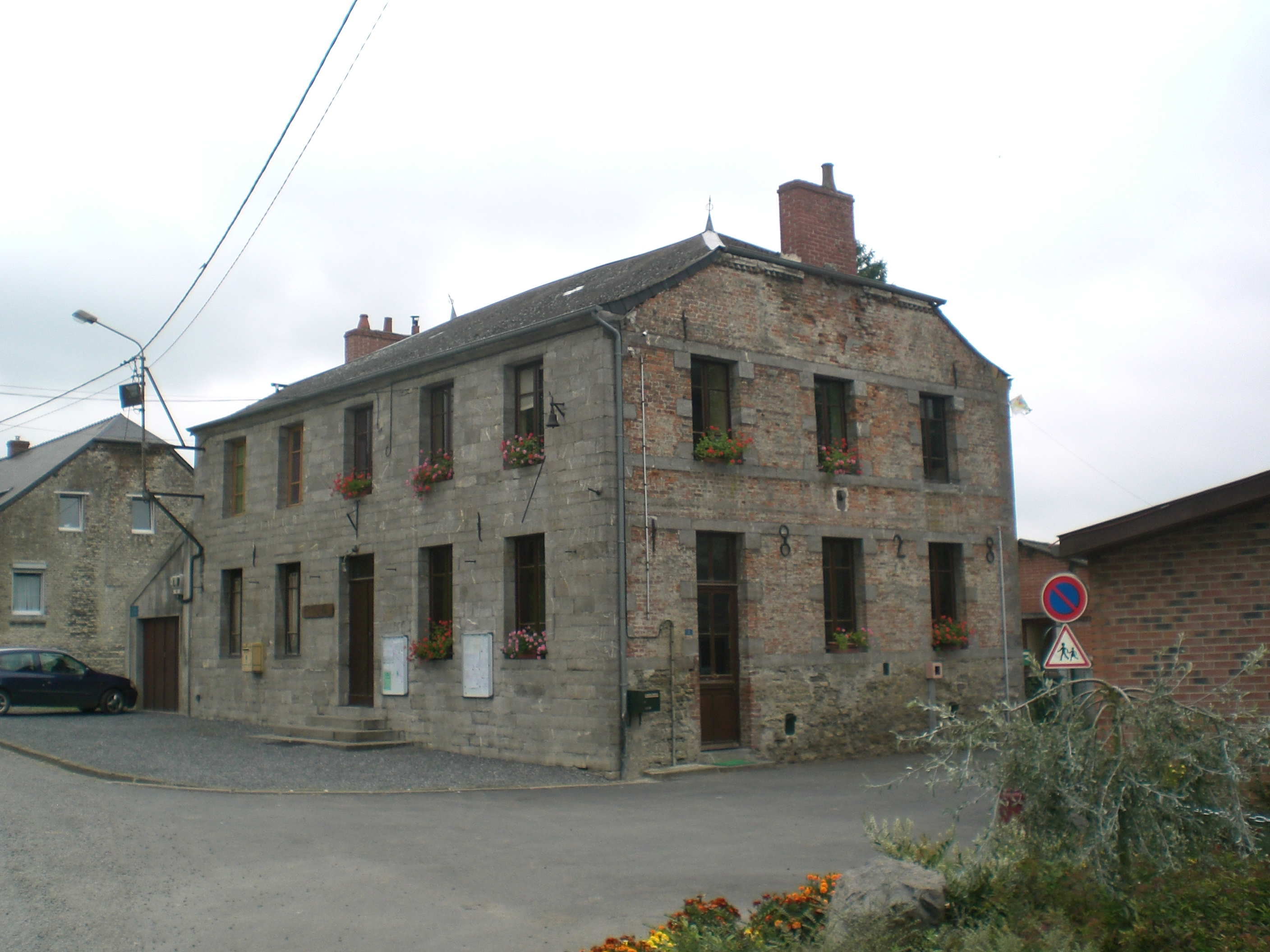
- The town hall in Rainsars

- Coat of arms
- Location of Rainsars
- Location within France Location within Hauts-de-France
- Coordinates: 50°04′21″N 3°59′32″E
- Country: France
- Region: Hauts-de-France
- Department: Nord
- Arrondissement: Avesnes-sur-Helpe
- Canton: Fourmies
- Intercommunality: Cœur de l'Avesnois

Government
  - Mayor (2020–2026): Colette Watremez
- Area^{1}: 6.16 km^{2} (2.38 sq mi)
- Elevation: 191 m (627 ft)
- Highest elevation: 223 m (732 ft)
- Lowest elevation: 160 m (520 ft)
- Population (2023): 197
  - Density: 32.0/km^{2} (82.8/sq mi)
- Time zone: UTC+01:00 (CET)
  - Summer (DST): UTC+02:00 (CEST)
- INSEE/Postal code: 59490 /59177
- ^{1} French Land Register data, which excludes lakes, ponds, glaciers > 1 km^{2} (0.386 sq mi or 247 acres) and river estuaries.

Rainsars is a commune in the Nord department in northern France.

== Heraldry ==
Arms of Rainsars	The arms of Rainsars are blazoned : Azure, a lion Or maintaining a key argent. (Dourlers, Pont-sur-Sambre and Rainsars use the same arms.)

== See also ==
- Communes of the Nord department
