= Beugnies =

- Commune
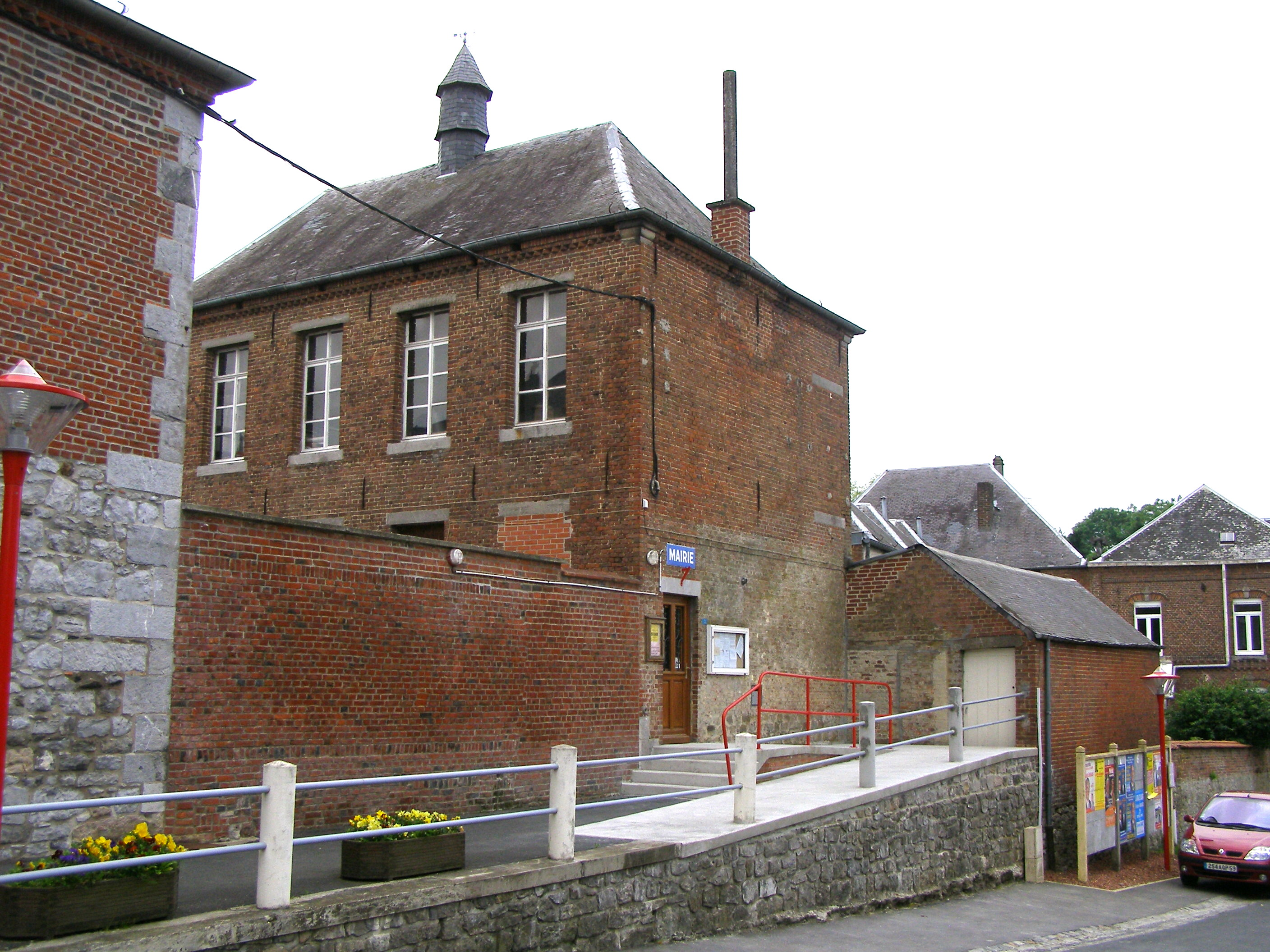
- Town hall

- Coat of arms
- Location of Beugnies
- Location within France Location within Hauts-de-France
- Coordinates: 50°09′44″N 4°00′56″E
- Country: France
- Region: Hauts-de-France
- Department: Nord
- Arrondissement: Avesnes-sur-Helpe
- Canton: Fourmies
- Intercommunality: CC Cœur de l'Avesnois

Government
  - Mayor (2020–2026): Frédéric Ernesti
- Area^{1}: 8.92 km^{2} (3.44 sq mi)
- Elevation: 192 m (630 ft)
- Highest elevation: 219 m (719 ft)
- Lowest elevation: 179 m (587 ft)
- Population (2023): 599
  - Density: 67.2/km^{2} (174/sq mi)
- Time zone: UTC+01:00 (CET)
  - Summer (DST): UTC+02:00 (CEST)
- INSEE/Postal code: 59078 /59216
- ^{1} French Land Register data, which excludes lakes, ponds, glaciers > 1 km^{2} (0.386 sq mi or 247 acres) and river estuaries.

Beugnies (French pronunciation: [bœɲi]) is a commune in the Nord department in northern France.

== Population ==
Historical population
| Year | Pop. | ±% p.a. |
|---|---|---|
| 1968 | 631 | — |
| 1975 | 555 | −1.82% |
| 1982 | 531 | −0.63% |
| 1990 | 509 | −0.53% |
| 1999 | 522 | +0.28% |
| 2007 | 494 | −0.69% |
| 2012 | 643 | +5.41% |
| 2017 | 635 | −0.25% |
| 2023 | 599 | −0.97% |
Source: INSEE

== Heraldry ==
| Arms of Beugnies | The arms of Beugnies are blazoned : Gules, 3 pales vair, and a chief Or. (Beugnies and Le Favril use the same arms.) |

== See also ==
- Communes of the Nord department
