= Bérelles =

- Commune
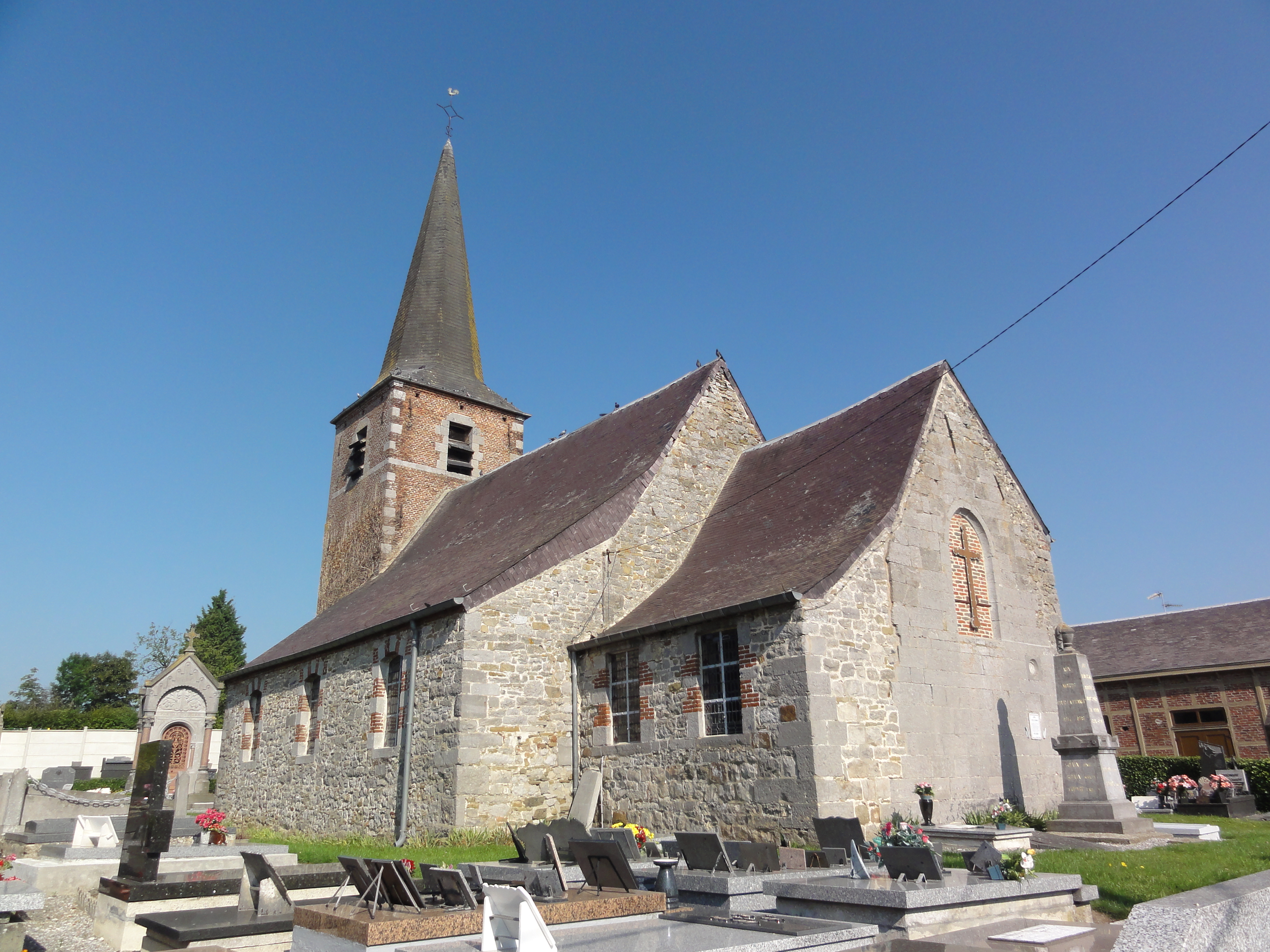
- The church in Bérelles

- Coat of arms
- Location of Bérelles
- Location within France Location within Hauts-de-France
- Coordinates: 50°12′59″N 4°05′55″E
- Country: France
- Region: Hauts-de-France
- Department: Nord
- Arrondissement: Avesnes-sur-Helpe
- Canton: Fourmies
- Intercommunality: CC Cœur de l'Avesnois

Government
  - Mayor (2020–2026): Orféo Rigoni
- Area^{1}: 5.78 km^{2} (2.23 sq mi)
- Elevation: 150 m (490 ft)
- Highest elevation: 229 m (751 ft)
- Lowest elevation: 168 m (551 ft)
- Population (2023): 163
  - Density: 28.2/km^{2} (73.0/sq mi)
- Time zone: UTC+01:00 (CET)
  - Summer (DST): UTC+02:00 (CEST)
- INSEE/Postal code: 59066 /59740
- ^{1} French Land Register data, which excludes lakes, ponds, glaciers > 1 km^{2} (0.386 sq mi or 247 acres) and river estuaries.

Bérelles (French pronunciation: [beʁɛl]) is a commune in the Nord department in northern France.

== Population ==
Historical population
Year	Pop.	±% p.a.
1968	165	—
1975	167	+0.17%
1982	144	−2.09%
1990	151	+0.60%
1999	156	+0.36%
2007	158	+0.16%
2012	170	+1.47%
2017	146	−3.00%
2023	163	+1.85%
Source: INSEE

== Heraldry ==
Arms of Bérelles	The arms of Bérelles are blazoned : Gules, in saltire 5 fleurs de lys.

== See also ==
- Communes of the Nord department
