= Willies, Nord =

Willies
- Commune
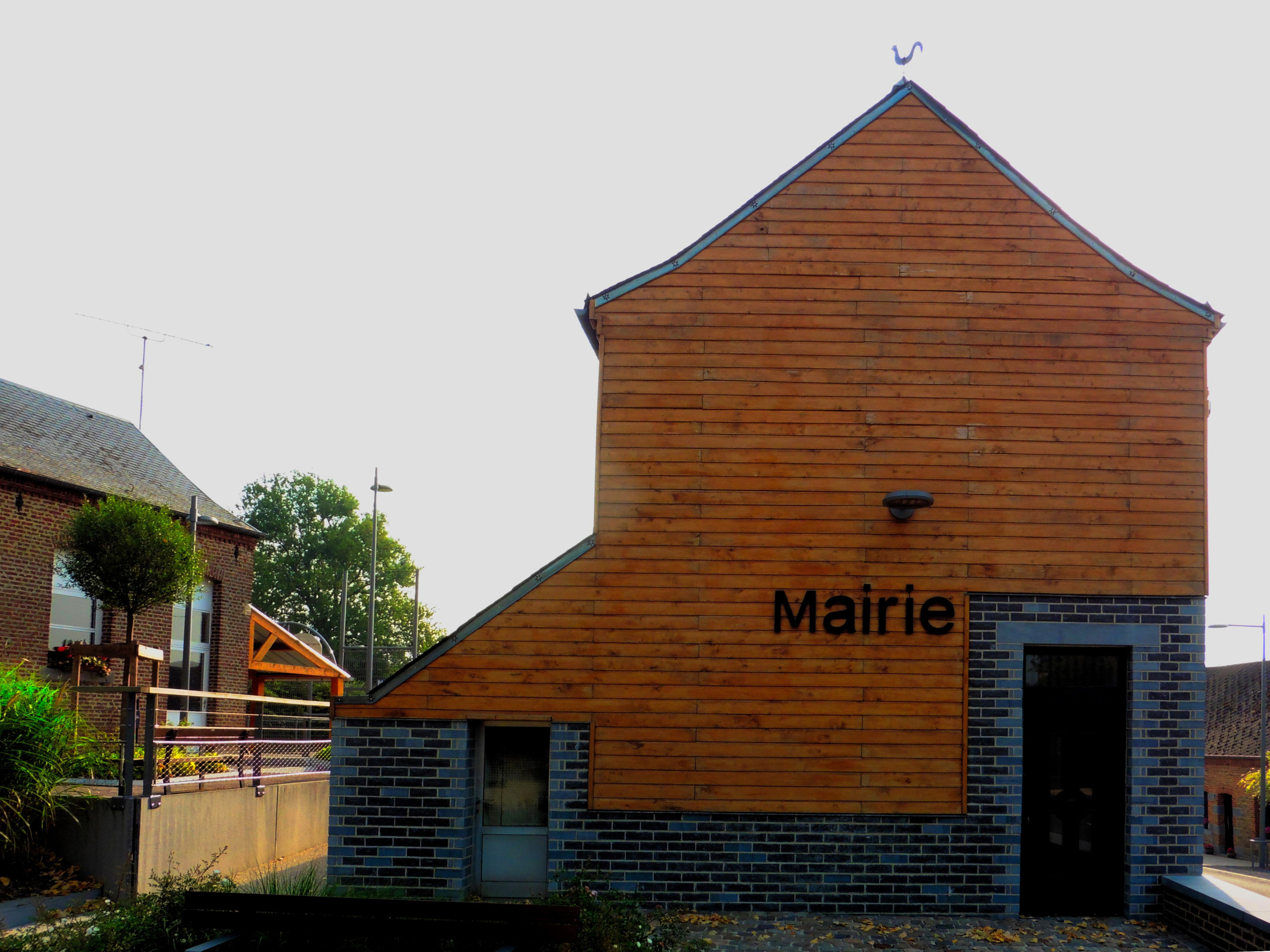
- The town hall in Willies

- Coat of arms
- Location of Willies
- Location within France Location within Hauts-de-France
- Coordinates: 50°07′18″N 4°05′56″E
- Country: France
- Region: Hauts-de-France
- Department: Nord
- Arrondissement: Avesnes-sur-Helpe
- Canton: Fourmies
- Intercommunality: Sud Avesnois

Government
  - Mayor (2020–2026): Patrick Landa
- Area^{1}: 4.14 km^{2} (1.60 sq mi)
- Elevation: 168 m (551 ft)
- Highest elevation: 230 m (750 ft)
- Lowest elevation: 162 m (531 ft)
- Population (2023): 128
  - Density: 30.9/km^{2} (80.1/sq mi)
- Time zone: UTC+01:00 (CET)
  - Summer (DST): UTC+02:00 (CEST)
- INSEE/Postal code: 59661 /59740
- ^{1} French Land Register data, which excludes lakes, ponds, glaciers > 1 km^{2} (0.386 sq mi or 247 acres) and river estuaries.

Willies is a commune in the Nord department in northern France. It is 10 km (6 mi) southeast of Maubeuge.

== Heraldry ==
Arms of Willies	The arms of Willies are blazoned : Gules, 2 fesses embattled counterembattled argent, overall on a canton Gules, 3 pales vair and a chief Or. (Baives and Willies use the same arms.)

== Population ==
Historical population
Year	Pop.	±% p.a.
1968	137	—
1975	107	−3.47%
1982	105	−0.27%
1990	128	+2.51%
1999	139	+0.92%
2007	150	+0.96%
2012	162	+1.55%
2017	148	−1.79%
2023	128	−2.39%
Source: INSEE

== See also ==
- Communes of the Nord department
