= Le Favril, Nord =

Le Favril
- Commune
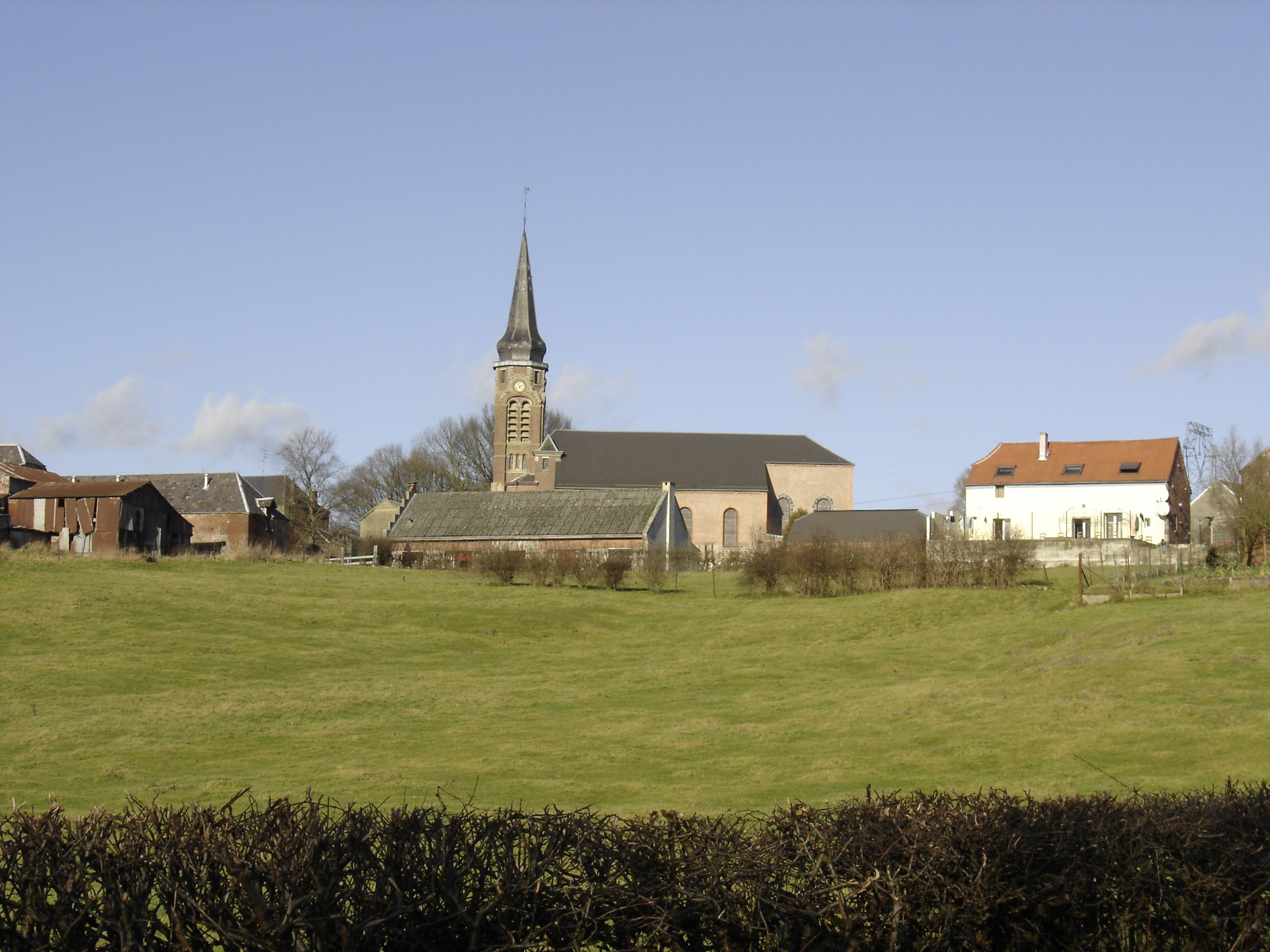
- The church in Le Favril

- Coat of arms
- Location of Le Favril
- Location within France Location within Hauts-de-France
- Coordinates: 50°06′13″N 3°43′22″E
- Country: France
- Region: Hauts-de-France
- Department: Nord
- Arrondissement: Avesnes-sur-Helpe
- Canton: Avesnes-sur-Helpe
- Intercommunality: CC Pays de Mormal

Government
  - Mayor (2020–2026): Nathalie Monier
- Area^{1}: 11.49 km^{2} (4.44 sq mi)
- Elevation: 166 m (545 ft)
- Highest elevation: 191 m (627 ft)
- Lowest elevation: 138 m (453 ft)
- Population (2023): 506
  - Density: 44.0/km^{2} (114/sq mi)
- Time zone: UTC+01:00 (CET)
  - Summer (DST): UTC+02:00 (CEST)
- INSEE/Postal code: 59223 /59550
- ^{1} French Land Register data, which excludes lakes, ponds, glaciers > 1 km^{2} (0.386 sq mi or 247 acres) and river estuaries.

Le Favril (French pronunciation: [lə favʁil], before 1962: Favril) is a commune in the Nord department in northern France.

== Heraldry ==
Arms of Le Favril	The arms of Le Favril are blazoned: Gules, 3 pales vair, and a chief Or. (Beugnies and Le Favril use the same arms.)

== See also ==
- Communes of the Nord department
