= Pont-sur-Sambre =

- Commune
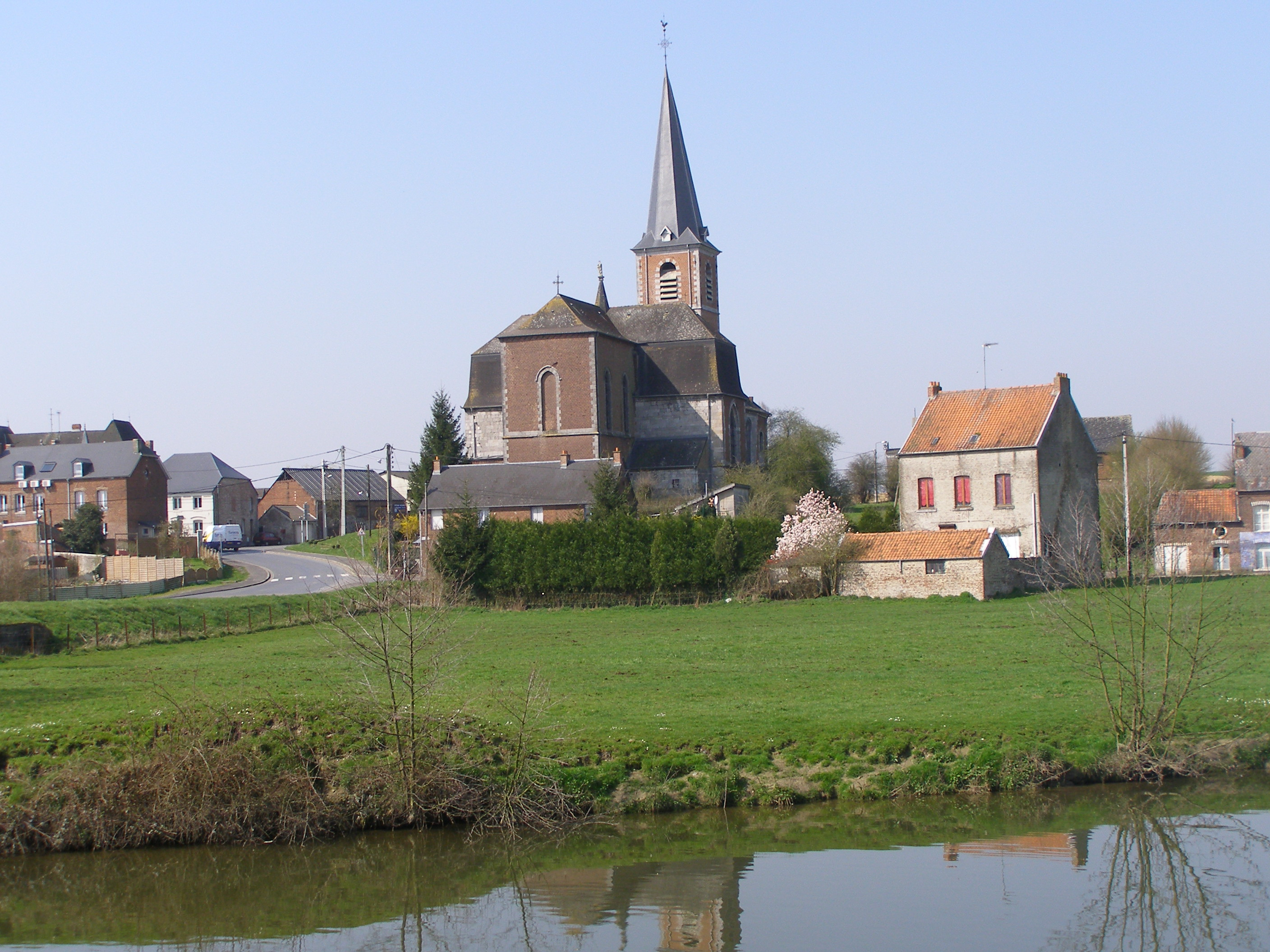
- Church neighborhood

- Coat of arms
- Location of Pont-sur-Sambre
- Location within France Location within Hauts-de-France
- Coordinates: 50°13′23″N 3°50′49″E
- Country: France
- Region: Hauts-de-France
- Department: Nord
- Arrondissement: Avesnes-sur-Helpe
- Canton: Aulnoye-Aymeries
- Intercommunality: CA Maubeuge Val de Sambre

Government
  - Mayor (2020–2026): Michel Détrait
- Area^{1}: 11.33 km^{2} (4.37 sq mi)
- Elevation: 143 m (469 ft)
- Highest elevation: 166 m (545 ft)
- Lowest elevation: 122 m (400 ft)
- Population (2023): 2,371
  - Density: 209.3/km^{2} (542.0/sq mi)
- Time zone: UTC+01:00 (CET)
  - Summer (DST): UTC+02:00 (CEST)
- INSEE/Postal code: 59467 /59138
- ^{1} French Land Register data, which excludes lakes, ponds, glaciers > 1 km^{2} (0.386 sq mi or 247 acres) and river estuaries.

Pont-sur-Sambre (French pronunciation: [pɔ̃ syʁ sɑ̃bʁ], literally Bridge on Sambre) is a commune in the Nord department in northern France.

== Population ==
Historical population
Year	Pop.	±% p.a.
1968	2,716	—
1975	2,749	+0.17%
1982	2,595	−0.82%
1990	2,443	−0.75%
1999	2,564	+0.54%
2007	2,604	+0.19%
2012	2,519	−0.66%
2017	2,541	+0.17%
2023	2,371	−1.15%
Source: INSEE

== Heraldry ==
Arms of Pont-sur-Sambre	The arms of Pont-sur-Sambre are blazoned : Azure, a lion Or maintaining a key argent. (Dourlers, Pont-sur-Sambre and Rainsars use the same arms.)

== See also ==
- Communes of the Nord department
