= Bas-Lieu =

- Commune
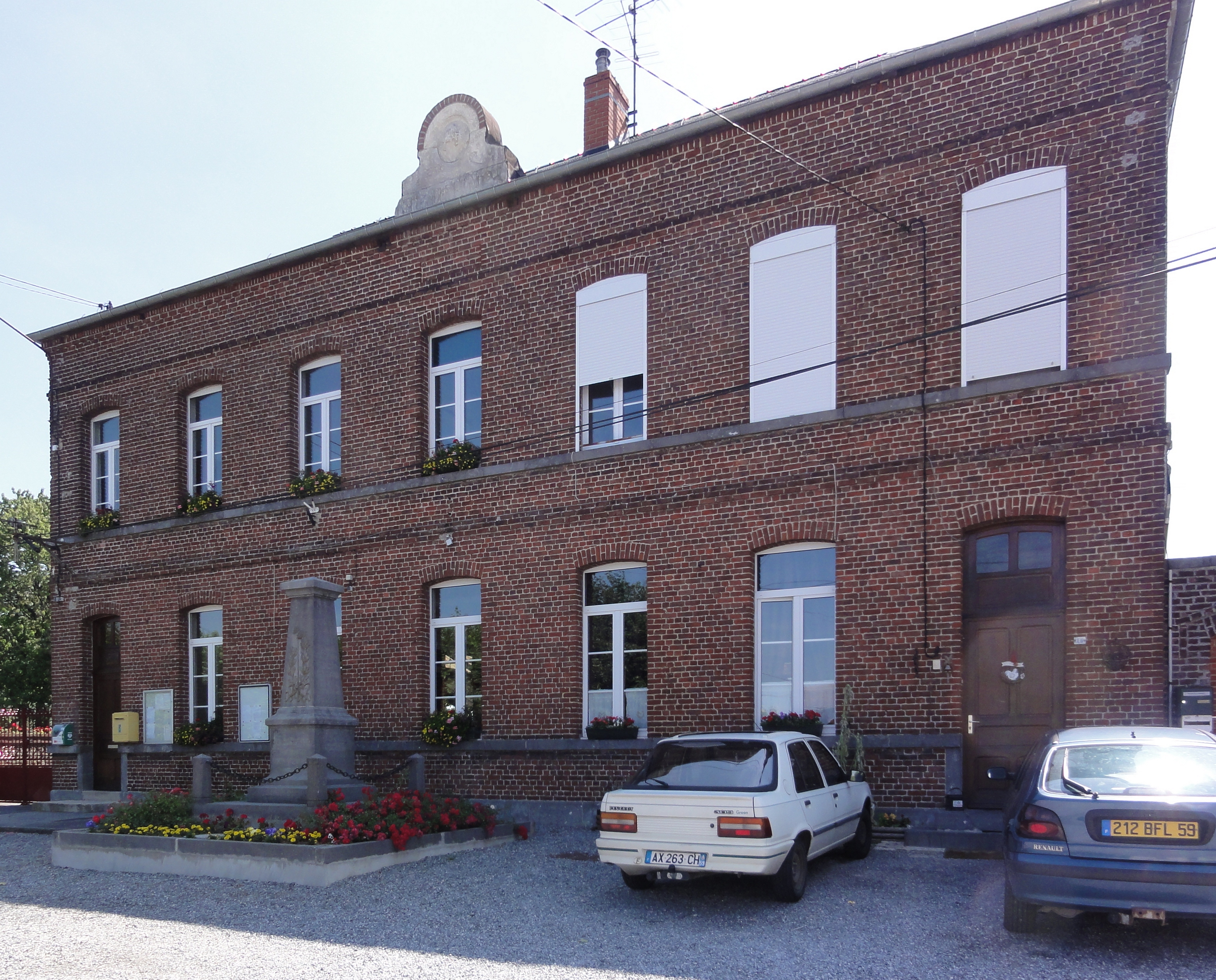
- The town hall in Bas-Lieu
- Location of Bas-Lieu
- Location within France Location within Hauts-de-France
- Coordinates: 50°08′05″N 3°56′30″E
- Country: France
- Region: Hauts-de-France
- Department: Nord
- Arrondissement: Avesnes-sur-Helpe
- Canton: Fourmies
- Intercommunality: Cœur de l'Avesnois

Government
  - Mayor (2020–2026): Ghislain Francois
- Area^{1}: 7.62 km^{2} (2.94 sq mi)
- Elevation: 180 m (590 ft)
- Highest elevation: 211 m (692 ft)
- Lowest elevation: 146 m (479 ft)
- Population (2023): 348
  - Density: 45.7/km^{2} (118/sq mi)
- Time zone: UTC+01:00 (CET)
  - Summer (DST): UTC+02:00 (CEST)
- INSEE/Postal code: 59050 /59440
- ^{1} French Land Register data, which excludes lakes, ponds, glaciers > 1 km^{2} (0.386 sq mi or 247 acres) and river estuaries.

Bas-Lieu (French pronunciation: [ba ljø]) is a commune in the Nord department in northern France.

== Population ==
Historical population
Year	Pop.	±% p.a.
1968	372	—
1975	355	−0.67%
1982	357	+0.08%
1990	349	−0.28%
1999	366	+0.53%
2007	322	−1.59%
2012	336	+0.85%
2017	349	+0.76%
2023	348	−0.05%
Source: INSEE

== See also ==
- Communes of the Nord department
