= Wallers-en-Fagne =

- Commune
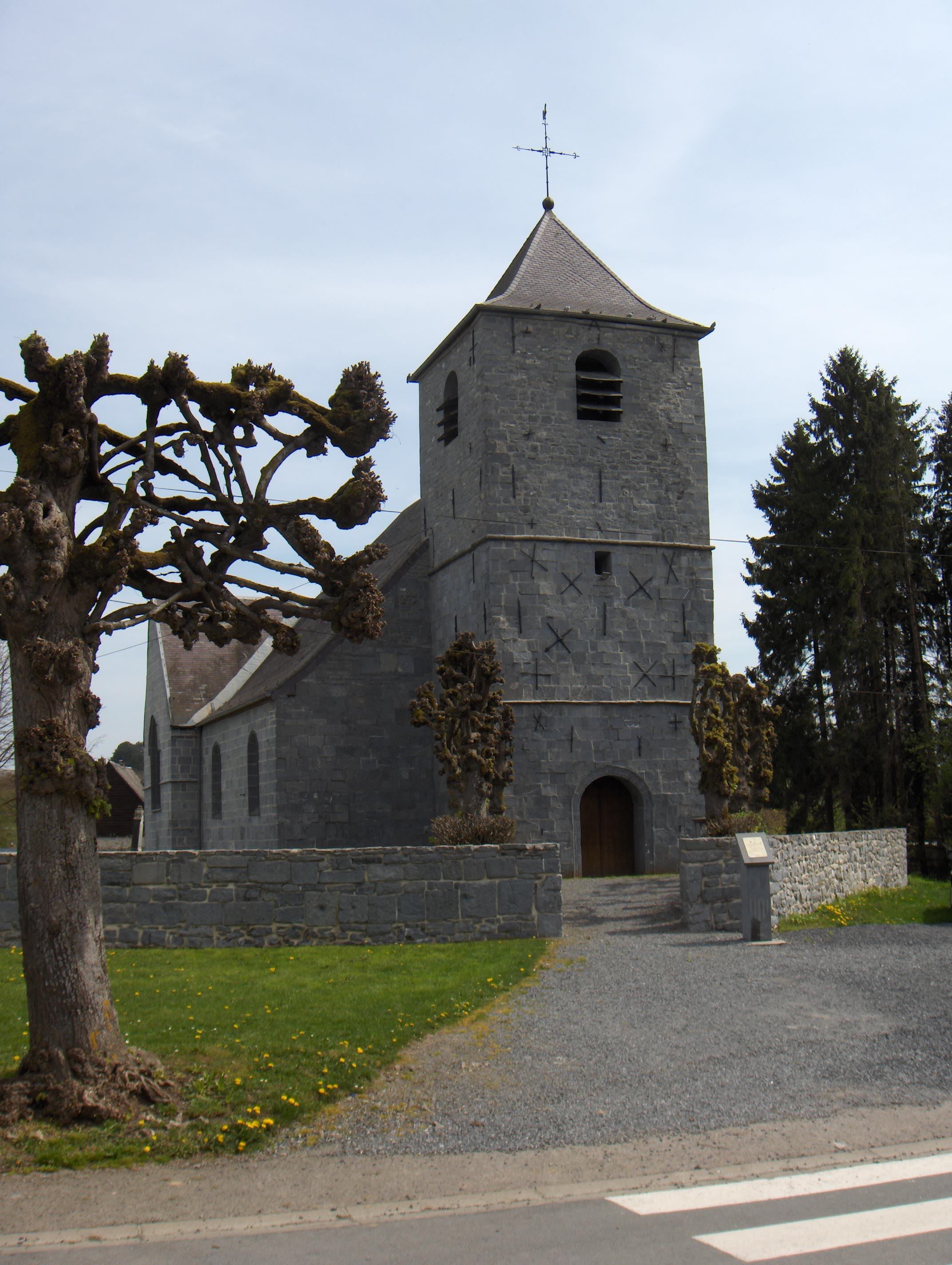
- The church in Wallers-en-Fagne

- Coat of arms
- Location of Wallers-en-Fagne
- Location within France Location within Hauts-de-France
- Coordinates: 50°03′51″N 4°10′35″E
- Country: France
- Region: Hauts-de-France
- Department: Nord
- Arrondissement: Avesnes-sur-Helpe
- Canton: Fourmies
- Intercommunality: CC Sud Avesnois

Government
  - Mayor (2020–2026): Bernard Navarre
- Area^{1}: 7.79 km^{2} (3.01 sq mi)
- Elevation: 222 m (728 ft)
- Highest elevation: 236 m (774 ft)
- Lowest elevation: 186 m (610 ft)
- Population (2023): 284
  - Density: 36.5/km^{2} (94.4/sq mi)
- Time zone: UTC+01:00 (CET)
  - Summer (DST): UTC+02:00 (CEST)
- INSEE/Postal code: 59633 /59132
- ^{1} French Land Register data, which excludes lakes, ponds, glaciers > 1 km^{2} (0.386 sq mi or 247 acres) and river estuaries.

Wallers-en-Fagne (before 2007: Wallers-Trélon) is a commune in the Nord department in northern France.

== Heraldry ==
Arms of Wallers-en-Fagne	The arms of Wallers-en-Fagne are blazoned : Or, 4 pales gules within a bordure engrailed azure. (Eppe-Sauvage, Ohain and Wallers-en-Fagne use the same arms.)

== Population ==
Historical population
Year	Pop.	±% p.a.
1968	257	—
1975	251	−0.34%
1982	225	−1.55%
1990	219	−0.34%
1999	215	−0.20%
2007	263	+2.55%
2012	299	+2.60%
2017	286	−0.89%
2023	284	−0.12%
Source: INSEE

== See also ==
- Communes of the Nord department
