= Avesnelles =

French commune

- Commune
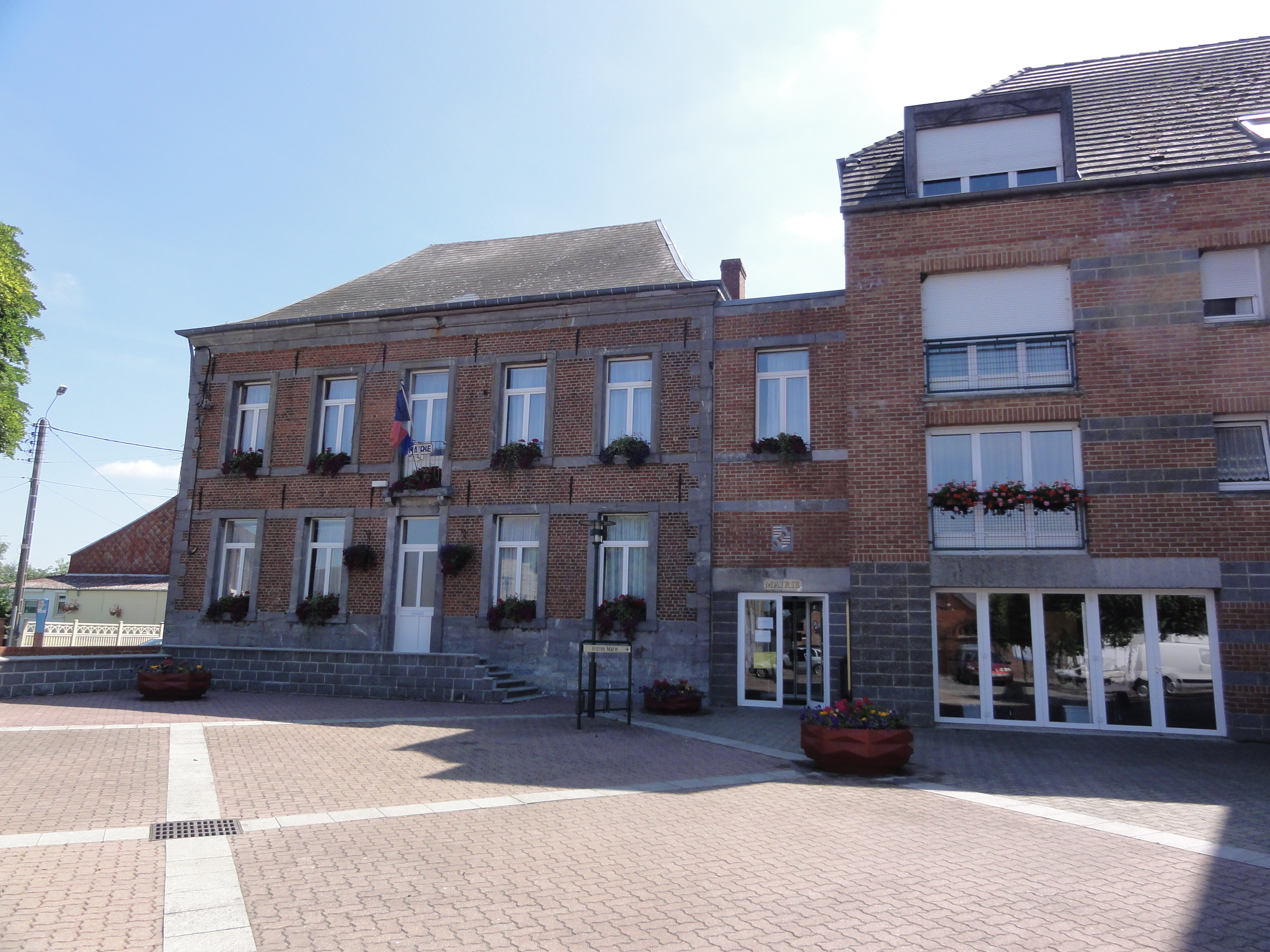
- The town hall in Avesnelles

- Coat of arms
- Location of Avesnelles
- Location within France Location within Hauts-de-France
- Coordinates: 50°07′06″N 3°56′38″E
- Country: France
- Region: Hauts-de-France
- Department: Nord
- Arrondissement: Avesnes-sur-Helpe
- Canton: Fourmies
- Intercommunality: CC Cœur de l'Avesnois

Government
  - Mayor (2020–2026): Antoine Badidi
- Area^{1}: 12.71 km^{2} (4.91 sq mi)
- Elevation: 206 m (676 ft)
- Highest elevation: 207 m (679 ft)
- Lowest elevation: 146 m (479 ft)
- Population (2023): 2,232
  - Density: 175.6/km^{2} (454.8/sq mi)
- Time zone: UTC+01:00 (CET)
  - Summer (DST): UTC+02:00 (CEST)
- INSEE/Postal code: 59035 /59440
- ^{1} French Land Register data, which excludes lakes, ponds, glaciers > 1 km^{2} (0.386 sq mi or 247 acres) and river estuaries.

Avesnelles (French pronunciation: [avɛnɛl]) is a commune in the Nord department in northern France.

== Population ==
Historical population

Year	Pop.	±% p.a.
1793	401	—
1821	635	+1.66%
1846	986	+1.78%
1872	1,596	+1.87%
1901	2,497	+1.56%
1926	2,554	+0.09%
1946	2,341	−0.43%
1962	2,564	+0.57%
1968	2,849	+1.77%

Year	Pop.	±% p.a.
1975	3,112	+1.27%
1982	3,031	−0.38%
1990	2,639	−1.72%
1999	2,572	−0.29%
2007	2,579	+0.03%
2012	2,492	−0.68%
2017	2,495	+0.02%
2023	2,232	−1.84%

Source: EHESS and INSEE (1968-2023)

== Heraldry ==
Arms of Avesnelles	The arms of Avesnelles are blazoned : Quarterly 1&4: Argent, 3 fesses gules (Croÿ); 2&4 Quarterly France and gules, overall an inescutcheon ermine (Brittany); over the whole arms an inescutcheon Gules, 3 roses Or (Arenberg).

== See also ==
- Communes of the Nord department
