= Choisies =

- Commune
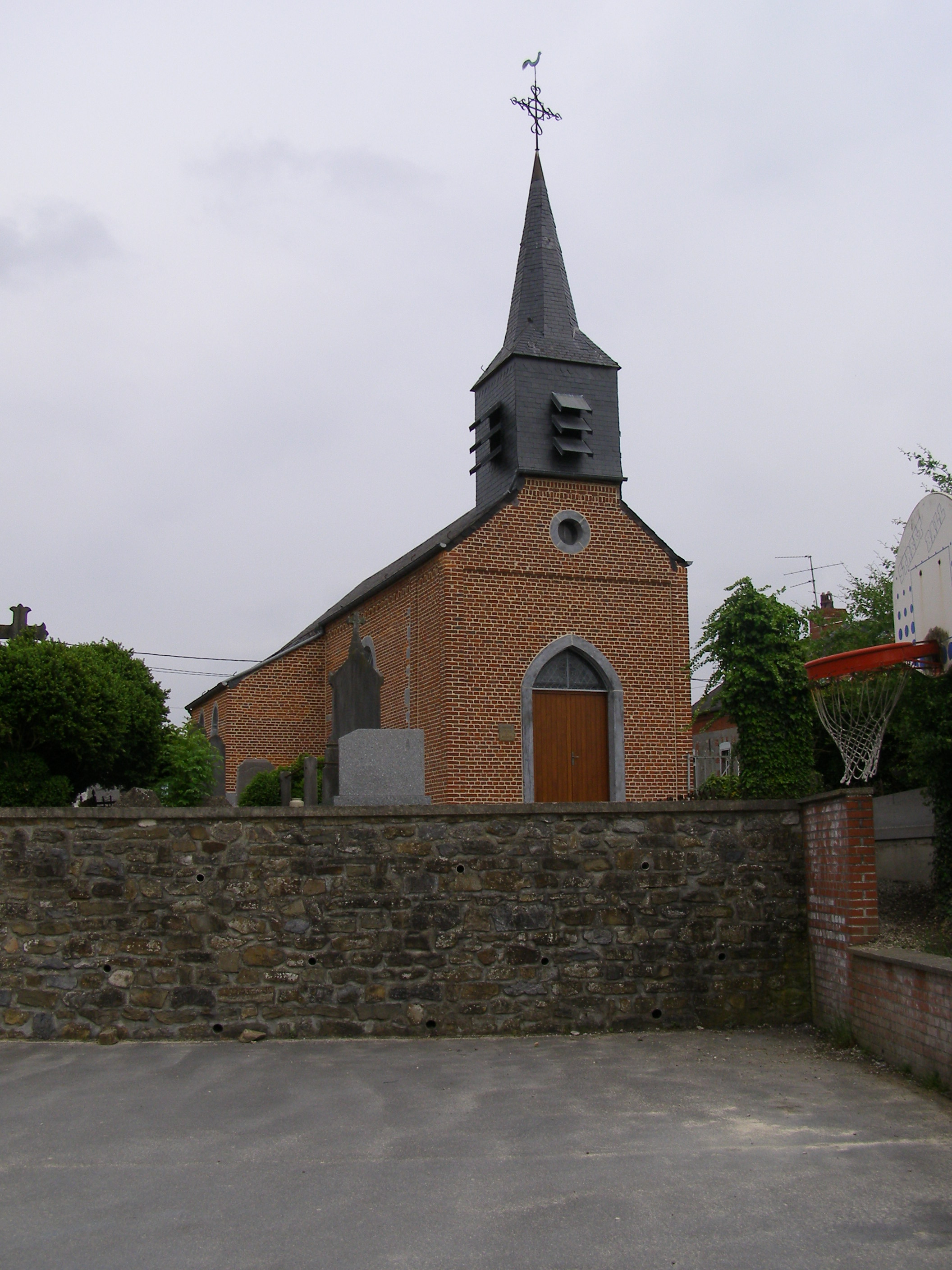
- The church in Choisies

- Coat of arms
- Location of Choisies
- Location within France Location within Hauts-de-France
- Coordinates: 50°12′53″N 4°02′34″E
- Country: France
- Region: Hauts-de-France
- Department: Nord
- Arrondissement: Avesnes-sur-Helpe
- Canton: Fourmies
- Intercommunality: Cœur de l'Avesnois

Government
  - Mayor (2020–2026): Bernard Paquet
- Area^{1}: 2.51 km^{2} (0.97 sq mi)
- Elevation: 148 m (486 ft)
- Highest elevation: 202 m (663 ft)
- Lowest elevation: 144 m (472 ft)
- Population (2023): 43
  - Density: 17/km^{2} (44/sq mi)
- Time zone: UTC+01:00 (CET)
  - Summer (DST): UTC+02:00 (CEST)
- INSEE/Postal code: 59147 /59740
- ^{1} French Land Register data, which excludes lakes, ponds, glaciers > 1 km^{2} (0.386 sq mi or 247 acres) and river estuaries.

Choisies (French pronunciation: [ʃwazi]) is a commune of the Nord department in northern France.

== Heraldry ==
Arms of Choisies	The arms of Choisies are blazoned : Ermine, on an inescutcheon sable semy of billets, a lion Or, armed and langued gules.

== See also ==
- Communes of the Nord department
