= Dourlers =

- Commune
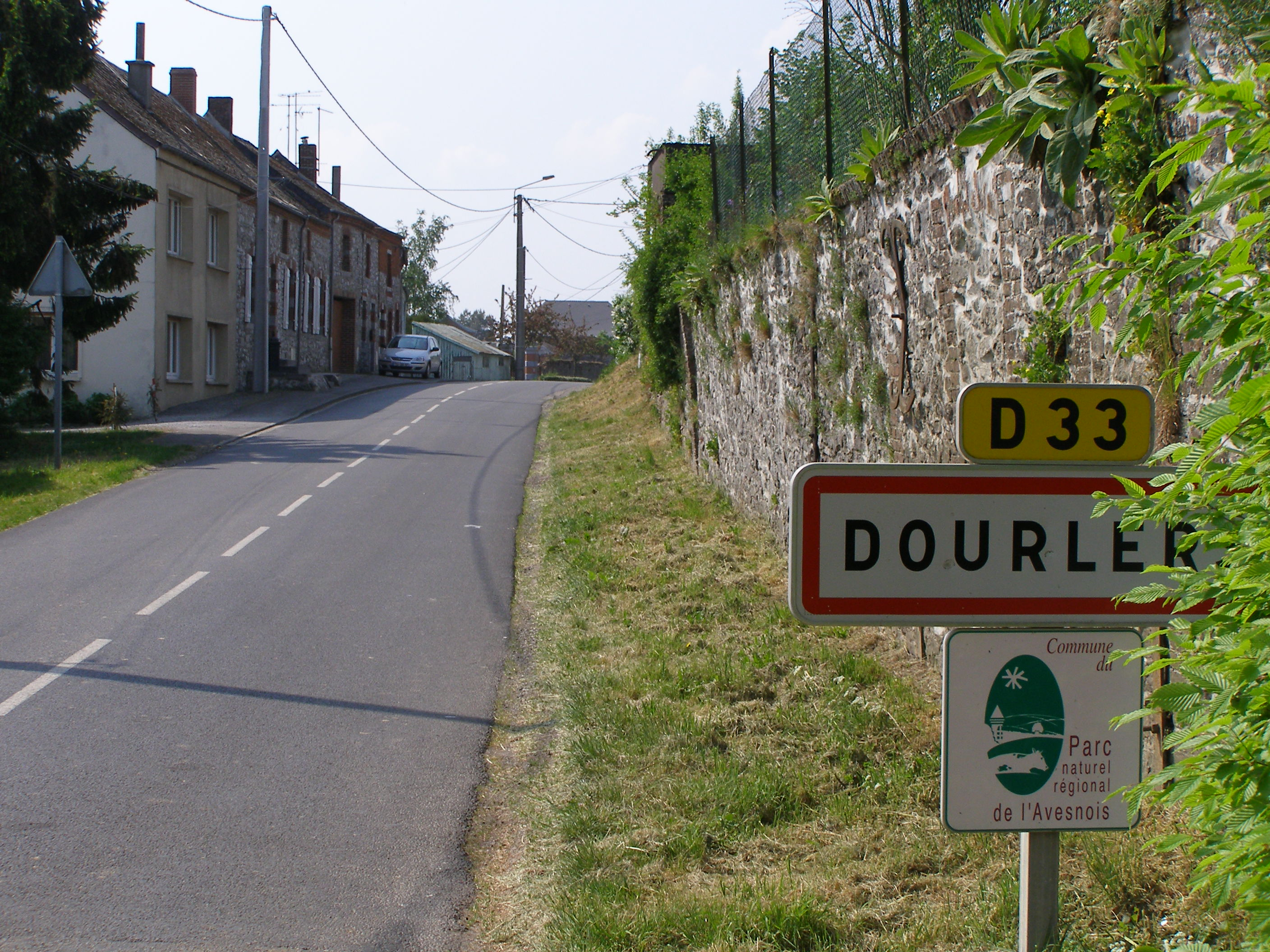
- The road into Dourlers

- Coat of arms
- Location of Dourlers
- Location within France Location within Hauts-de-France
- Coordinates: 50°10′37″N 3°56′14″E
- Country: France
- Region: Hauts-de-France
- Department: Nord
- Arrondissement: Avesnes-sur-Helpe
- Canton: Avesnes-sur-Helpe
- Intercommunality: CC Cœur de l'Avesnois

Government
  - Mayor (2020–2026): Freddy Thery
- Area^{1}: 8.74 km^{2} (3.37 sq mi)
- Elevation: 171 m (561 ft)
- Highest elevation: 205 m (673 ft)
- Lowest elevation: 158 m (518 ft)
- Population (2023): 536
  - Density: 61.3/km^{2} (159/sq mi)
- Time zone: UTC+01:00 (CET)
  - Summer (DST): UTC+02:00 (CEST)
- INSEE/Postal code: 59181 /59440
- ^{1} French Land Register data, which excludes lakes, ponds, glaciers > 1 km^{2} (0.386 sq mi or 247 acres) and river estuaries.

Dourlers is a commune in the Nord department (district) of northern France.

== Heraldry ==
Arms of Dourlers	The arms of Dourlers are blazoned : Azure, a lion Or maintaining a key argent. (Dourlers, Pont-sur-Sambre and Rainsars use the same arms.)

== See also ==
- Communes of the Nord department
