= Ohain, Nord =

Ohain
- Commune
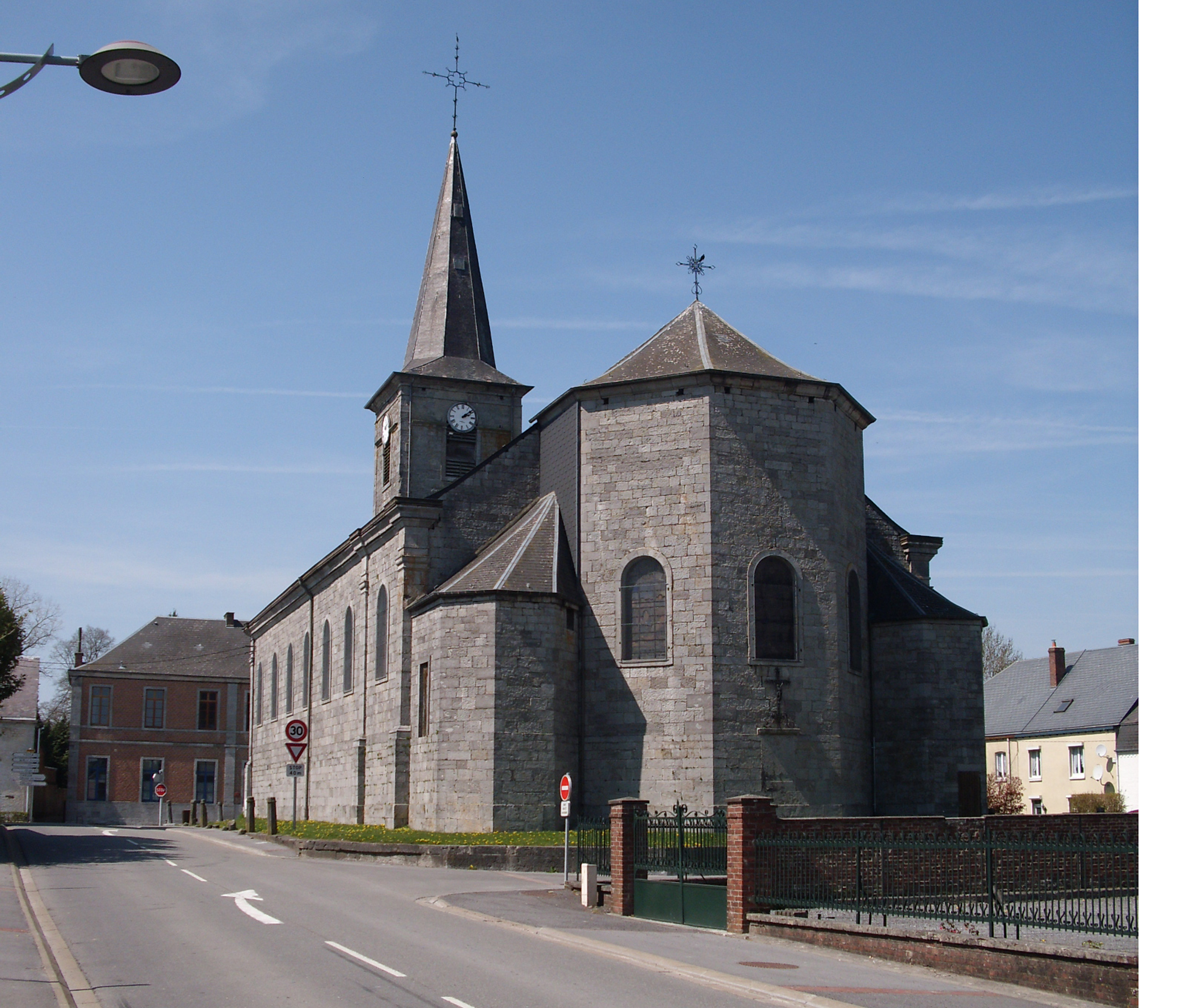
- The church in Ohain

- Coat of arms
- Location of Ohain
- Location within France Location within Hauts-de-France
- Coordinates: 50°02′27″N 4°07′10″E
- Country: France
- Region: Hauts-de-France
- Department: Nord
- Arrondissement: Avesnes-sur-Helpe
- Canton: Fourmies
- Intercommunality: CC Sud Avesnois

Government
  - Mayor (2020–2026): Sylvain Oxoby
- Area^{1}: 11.88 km^{2} (4.59 sq mi)
- Elevation: 250 m (820 ft)
- Highest elevation: 255 m (837 ft)
- Lowest elevation: 204 m (669 ft)
- Population (2023): 1,171
  - Density: 98.57/km^{2} (255.3/sq mi)
- Time zone: UTC+01:00 (CET)
  - Summer (DST): UTC+02:00 (CEST)
- INSEE/Postal code: 59445 /59132
- ^{1} French Land Register data, which excludes lakes, ponds, glaciers > 1 km^{2} (0.386 sq mi or 247 acres) and river estuaries.

Ohain (French pronunciation: [ɔ.ɛ̃]) is a commune in the Nord department in northern France.

== Heraldry ==
Arms of Ohain	The arms of Ohain are blazoned : Or, 4 pales gules within a bordure engrailed azure. (Eppe-Sauvage, Ohain and Wallers-en-Fagne use the same arms.)

== See also ==
- Communes of the Nord department
