= Beaurieux, Nord =

Beaurieux
- Commune
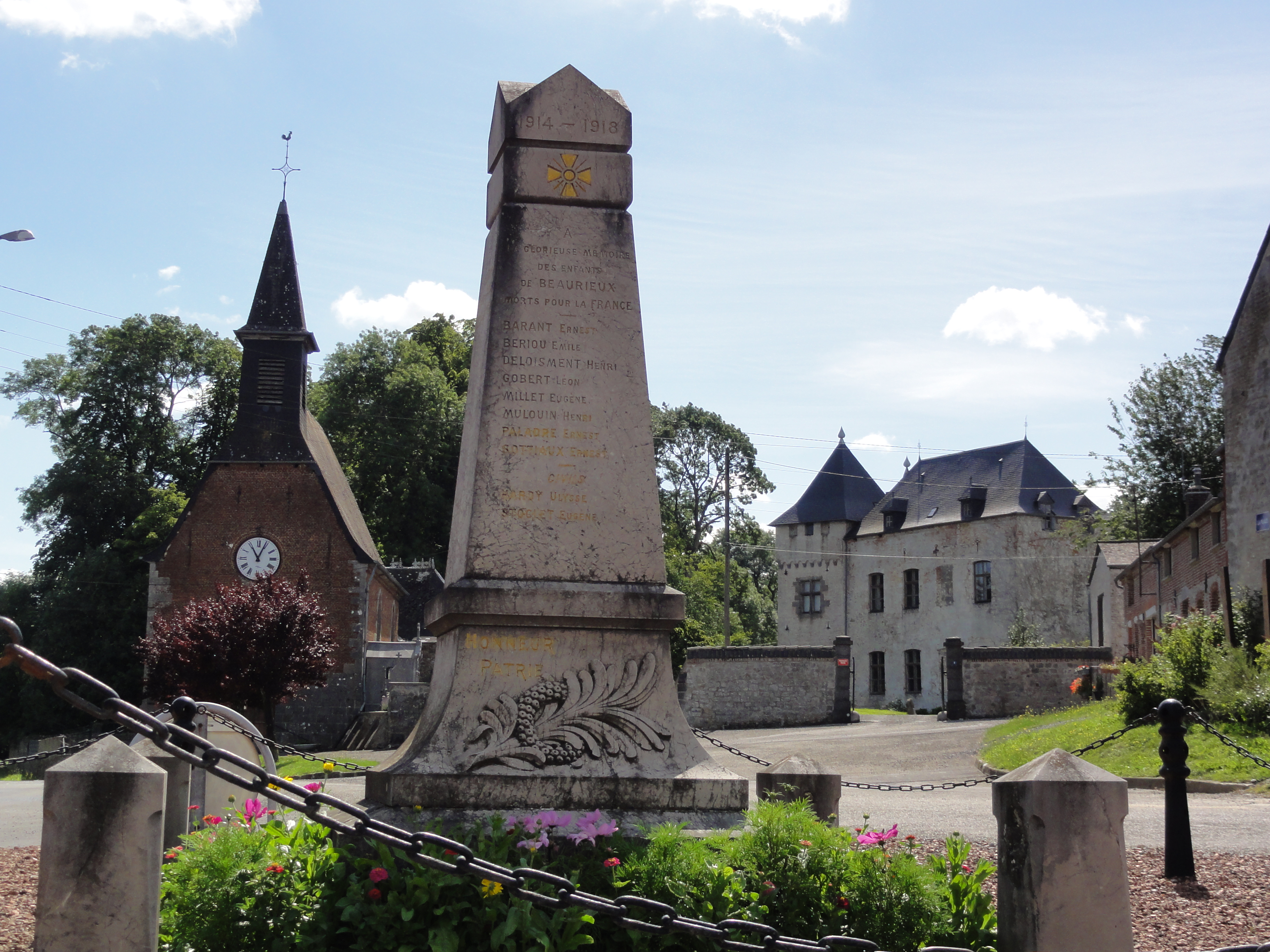
- A view within Beaurieux

- Coat of arms
- Location of Beaurieux
- Location within France Location within Hauts-de-France
- Coordinates: 50°10′40″N 4°07′40″E
- Country: France
- Region: Hauts-de-France
- Department: Nord
- Arrondissement: Avesnes-sur-Helpe
- Canton: Fourmies
- Intercommunality: Cœur de l'Avesnois

Government
  - Mayor (2020–2026): Emmanuel Dursent
- Area^{1}: 7.39 km^{2} (2.85 sq mi)
- Elevation: 200 m (660 ft)
- Highest elevation: 243 m (797 ft)
- Lowest elevation: 176 m (577 ft)
- Population (2023): 169
  - Density: 22.9/km^{2} (59.2/sq mi)
- Time zone: UTC+01:00 (CET)
  - Summer (DST): UTC+02:00 (CEST)
- INSEE/Postal code: 59062 /59740
- ^{1} French Land Register data, which excludes lakes, ponds, glaciers > 1 km^{2} (0.386 sq mi or 247 acres) and river estuaries.

Beaurieux (French pronunciation: [boʁjø]) is a commune in the Nord department in northern France. It is about 1.5 km from the Belgian border, and about 25 km from Charleroi.

== Population ==
Historical population
Year	Pop.	±% p.a.
1968	207	—
1975	191	−1.14%
1982	176	−1.16%
1990	182	+0.42%
1999	178	−0.25%
2007	167	−0.79%
2012	166	−0.12%
2017	165	−0.12%
2023	169	+0.40%
Source: INSEE

== Heraldry ==
Arms of Beaurieux	The arms of Beaurieux are blazoned : Sable, a chief indented Or.

== See also ==
- Communes of the Nord department
