= Eppe-Sauvage =

- Commune
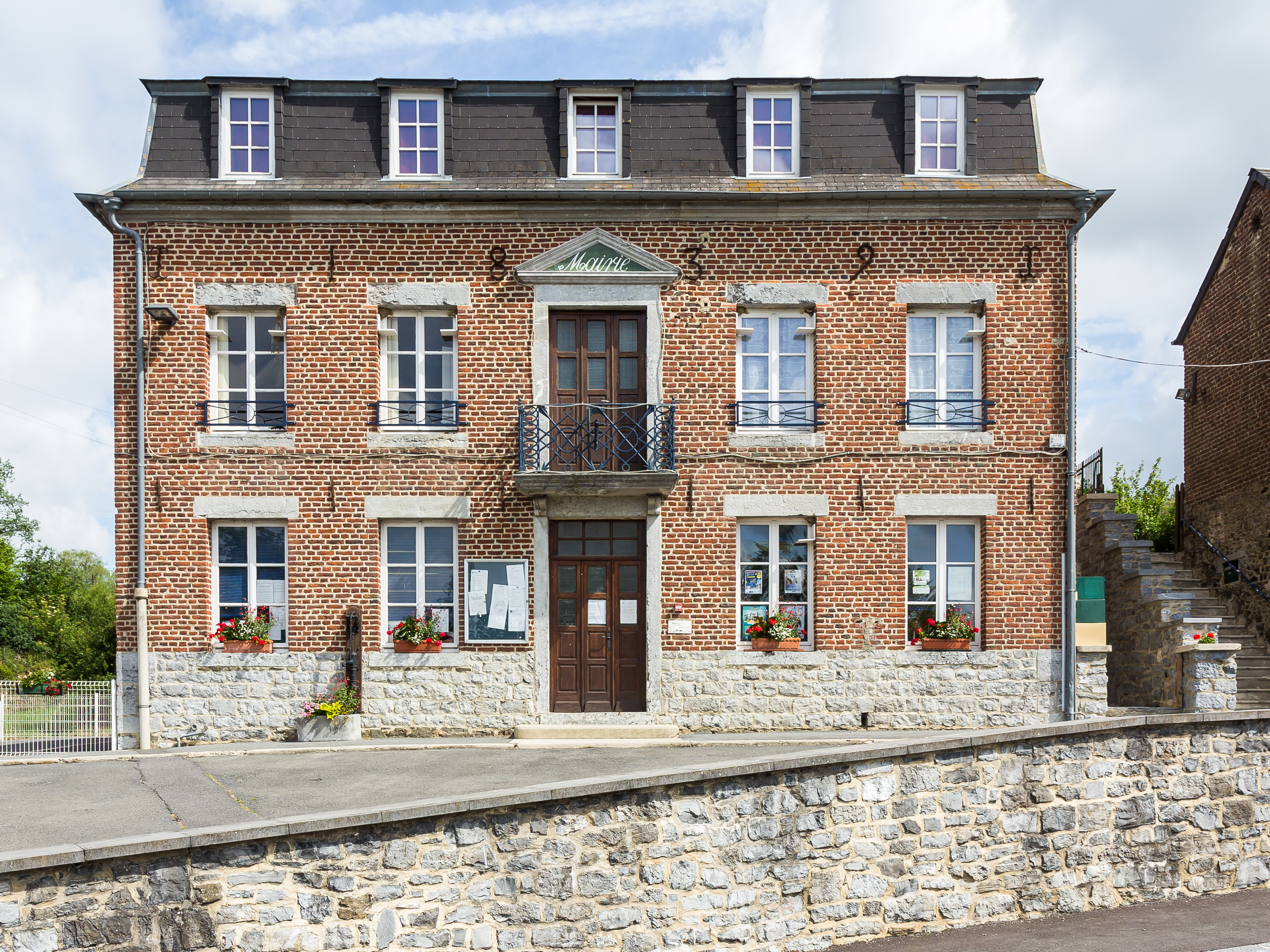
- The town hall in Eppe-Sauvage

- Coat of arms
- Location of Eppe-Sauvage
- Location within France Location within Hauts-de-France
- Coordinates: 50°07′13″N 4°10′45″E
- Country: France
- Region: Hauts-de-France
- Department: Nord
- Arrondissement: Avesnes-sur-Helpe
- Canton: Fourmies
- Intercommunality: Sud Avesnois

Government
  - Mayor (2020–2026): Viviane Desmarchelier
- Area^{1}: 16.67 km^{2} (6.44 sq mi)
- Elevation: 223 m (732 ft)
- Highest elevation: 257 m (843 ft)
- Lowest elevation: 172 m (564 ft)
- Population (2023): 237
  - Density: 14.2/km^{2} (36.8/sq mi)
- Time zone: UTC+01:00 (CET)
  - Summer (DST): UTC+02:00 (CEST)
- INSEE/Postal code: 59198 /59132
- ^{1} French Land Register data, which excludes lakes, ponds, glaciers > 1 km^{2} (0.386 sq mi or 247 acres) and river estuaries.

Eppe-Sauvage (French pronunciation: [ɛp sovaʒ]) is a commune in the Nord department in the region of Hauts-de-France in northern France.

== Heraldry ==
Arms of Eppe-Sauvage	The arms of Eppe-Sauvage are blazoned : Or, 4 pales gules within a bordure engrailed azure. (Eppe-Sauvage, Ohain and Wallers-en-Fagne use the same arms.)

== See also ==
- Communes of the Nord department
