= Antoine de Vinck =

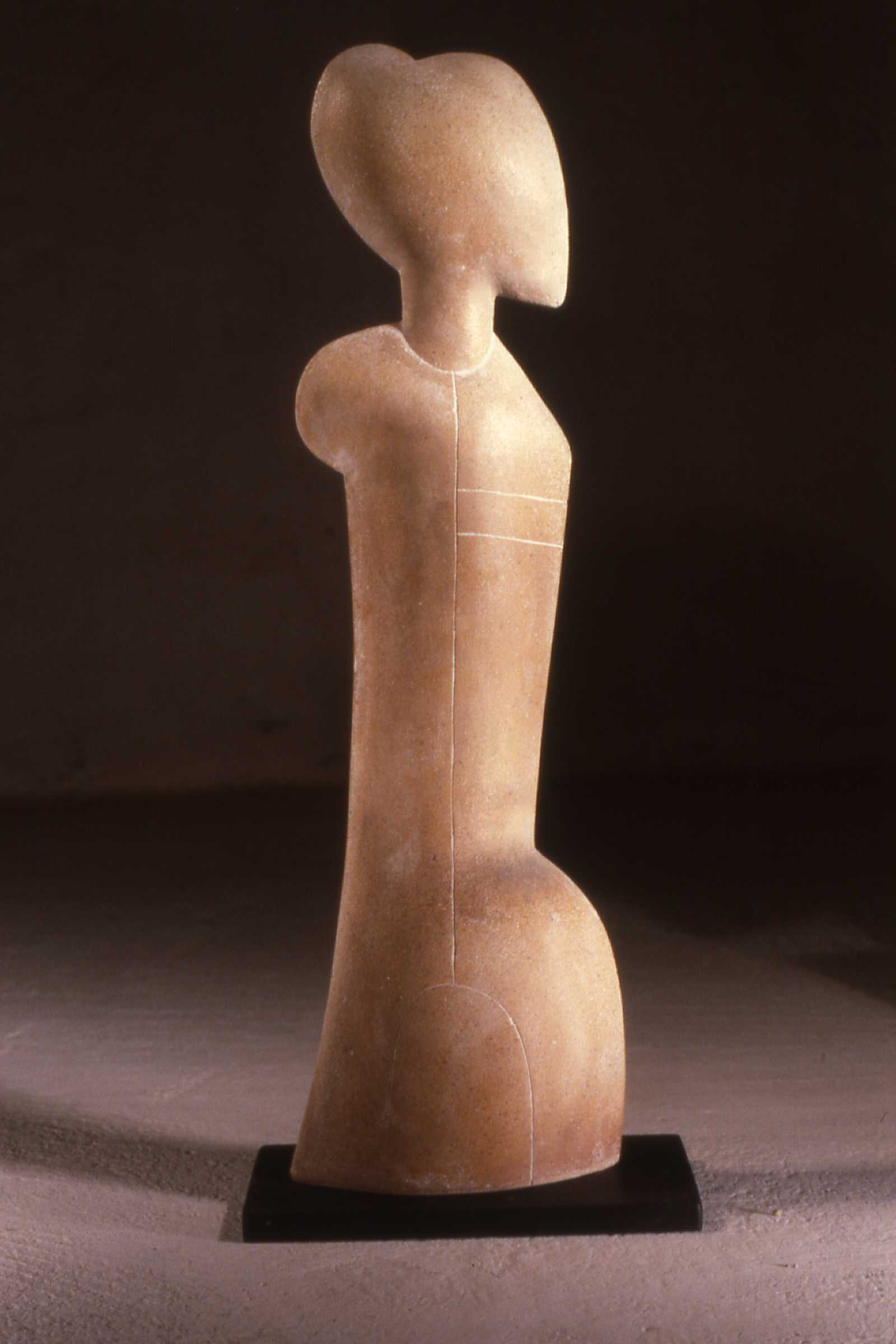
Ceramic sculpture (stoneware) by Antoine de Vinck, from the series Atlantes (1987)

Antoine de Vinck, Baron (16 April 1924 in Kortenaken, Belgium – 13 May 1992 in Auxerre, France), was a Belgian ceramist, designer and sculptor.

== Biography ==
After completing his studies in philosophy and theology, Antoine de Vinck took up art in 1948 mainly concentrating on drawing, book illustration, and wood carving. Thanks to A Potter's Book by Bernard Leach, he and a friend, Guy de Sauvage, taught themselves ceramics and built a wood-fired kiln. In 1951 and 1952, he attended the workshops of the ceramist Pierre Caille and the sculptor Oscar Jespers in La Cambre School (Ecole nationale supérieure d’architecture et des arts décoratifs) in Brussels . He then travelled through France, meeting potters Jean and Jacqueline Lerat in La Borne, Norbert and Jeannette Pierlot in Ratilly and Daniel de Montmollin in Taizé.

In 1954, he started his own studio in Kraainem near Brussels, where he built his second wood-fired kiln. After meeting Barnard Leach, he took on the task of translating his book into French. For the Universal Exhibition held in Brussels in 1958, he designed, in close collaboration with his sculptor friend Jean-Paul Edmonds-Alt, a large ceramics mural for the pavilion of the Congo Mines’ Union.

From 1960 to 1975, in addition to his work as ceramics sculptor, de Vinck did industrial design and got involved in the World Crafts Council (WCC). He applied this experience in design to a part of his ceramics production, making dishes, vases, wash-basins, ashtrays, etc. His sculpture Arbre (Tree) was awarded a prize at the international ceramics competition of Faenza.

In 1984 he settled near Treigny, in Burgundy, France. There he took part in the activities and exhibitions of the APCP (The Association of artist potters of Puisaye).

== Work ==
Antoine de Vinck is regarded as one of the main players in the renewal of ceramic art in Post-War Europe. His work includes pieces of pottery such as dishes, pots, bowls, etc. as well as sculptures.

He was an untiring advocate for potters’ producing high quality work, and applied his demands to his own work.

"The object must serve its purpose as well as possible, while being pleasing to the senses of the user. Its use must be apparent at first glance."

For his sculptural work, he developed a technique of assembling clay panels, which can be compared to a dress-maker putting together pieces of material to make a garment. He also used molds in which he laid layers of clay so as to create different designs and textures especially for his Stèles (Stelae) and Bétyles (Baetuli). Most of his works were made from clay, but he also made porcelain and raku ware.

As de Vinck was a skilled drawer, he used his talent in the conception of each work, making many sketches from which he later chose the best.

He found the inspiration for his work in the ancient civilizations of Africa, South America, Asia and pre-Christian Celtic Europe. His works show his constant awareness of the sacred, transcending all forms of formal religious worship. This polarity can be found in the naming of "families" of sculptures: the "Idols" (from the late 1970s), "Atlantes", "Cippes" (Cippi), "Trophies", "Soul Mirrors", etc.

== Exhibitions and museums ==
Individual exhibitions from 1951 in Brussels and other Belgian cities and towns, as well as Lyon, Hanover, Paris, and Munich. An important retrospective exhibition of his work was held in 1986 in the Royal Museum of Mariemont, Belgium. Posthumous exhibitions: The Centre Culturel de l’Yonne in Avallon, France in 1993. The Musée du Grès (Stoneware Museum) in St-Amand-en-Puisaye, France in 2007. Antoine de Vinck participated in numerous collective exhibitions in most European countries, as well as in South Africa, Canada and Japan. Many of his works were bought by the Belgian State, by museums and by art collectors. Several of his works can be seen in the permanent collection of the Musée du Cinquantenaire (Royal Museums of Fine Arts of Belgium) in Brussels.
