= Sars-Poteries =

- Commune
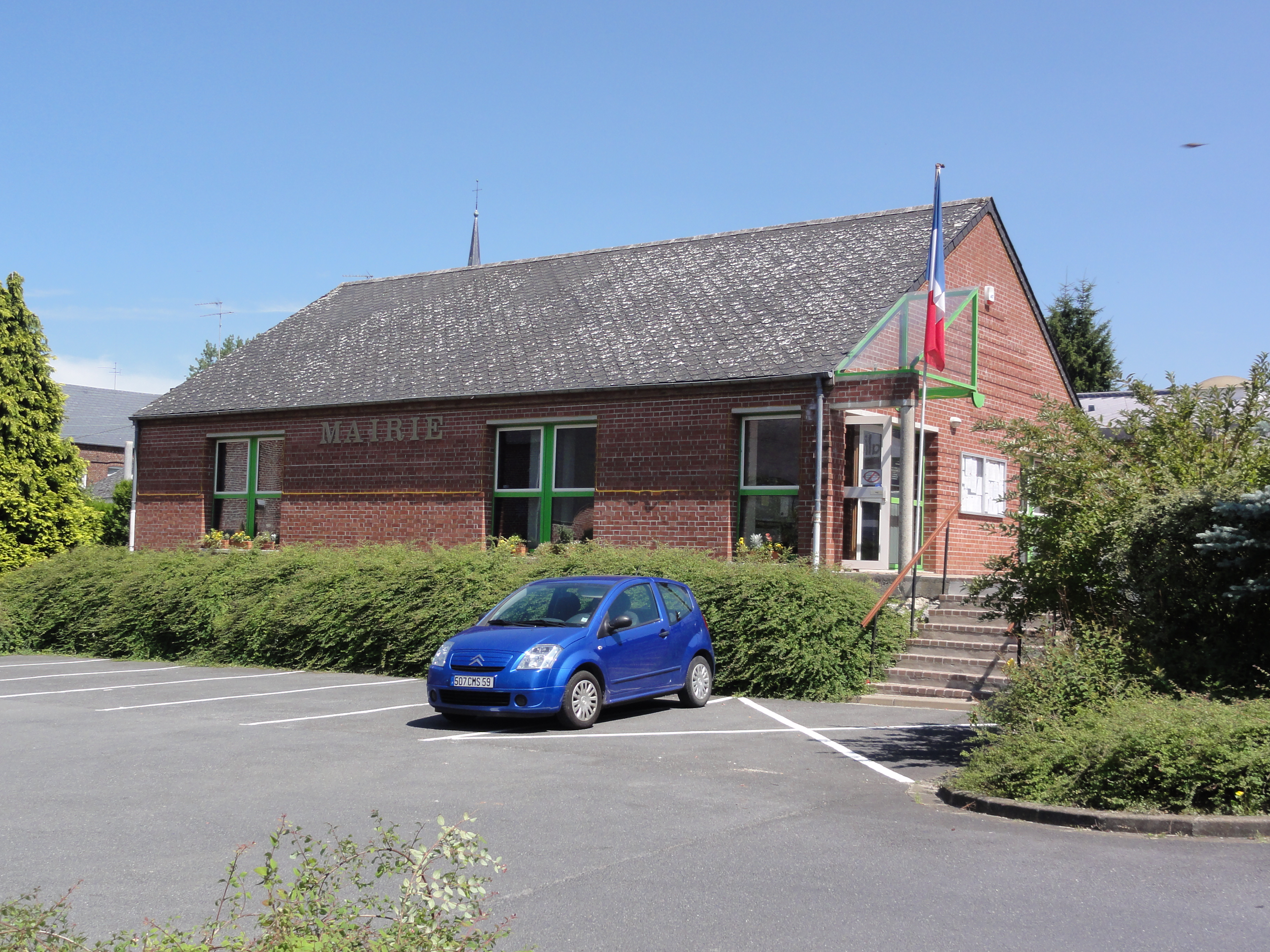
- The town hall in Sars-Poteries

- Coat of arms
- Location of Sars-Poteries
- Location within France Location within Hauts-de-France
- Coordinates: 50°10′12″N 4°01′38″E
- Country: France
- Region: Hauts-de-France
- Department: Nord
- Arrondissement: Avesnes-sur-Helpe
- Canton: Fourmies
- Intercommunality: CC Cœur de l'Avesnois

Government
  - Mayor (2025–2026): Bernard Molitor
- Area^{1}: 7.88 km^{2} (3.04 sq mi)
- Elevation: 183 m (600 ft)
- Highest elevation: 229 m (751 ft)
- Lowest elevation: 163 m (535 ft)
- Population (2023): 1,402
  - Density: 178/km^{2} (461/sq mi)
- Time zone: UTC+01:00 (CET)
  - Summer (DST): UTC+02:00 (CEST)
- INSEE/Postal code: 59555 /59216
- ^{1} French Land Register data, which excludes lakes, ponds, glaciers > 1 km^{2} (0.386 sq mi or 247 acres) and river estuaries.

Sars-Poteries (French pronunciation: [saʁ pɔtʁi]) is a commune in the Nord department in northern France.

== Heraldry ==
Arms of Sars-Poteries	The arms of Sars-Poteries are blazoned : Or, on a bend gules, 3 lions argent.

== See also ==
- Communes of the Nord department
