= Canton of Fourmies =

Canton of France

Coordinates: 50.02°N 4.05°E

The canton of Fourmies is an administrative division of the Nord department, northern France. It was created at the French canton reorganisation which came into effect in March 2015. Its seat is in Fourmies.

It consists of the following communes:

1. Aibes
2. Anor
3. Avesnelles
4. Baives
5. Bas-Lieu
6. Beaurieux
7. Bérelles
8. Beugnies
9. Bousignies-sur-Roc
10. Cerfontaine
11. Choisies
12. Clairfayts
13. Colleret
14. Cousolre
15. Damousies
16. Dimechaux
17. Dimont
18. Eccles
19. Eppe-Sauvage
20. Felleries
21. Féron
22. Ferrière-la-Petite
23. Flaumont-Waudrechies
24. Fourmies
25. Glageon
26. Hestrud
27. Lez-Fontaine
28. Liessies
29. Moustier-en-Fagne
30. Obrechies
31. Ohain
32. Quiévelon
33. Rainsars
34. Ramousies
35. Recquignies
36. Rousies
37. Sains-du-Nord
38. Sars-Poteries
39. Sémeries
40. Solre-le-Château
41. Solrinnes
42. Trélon
43. Wallers-en-Fagne
44. Wattignies-la-Victoire
45. Wignehies
46. Willies
