= Beaurieux, Aisne =

Beaurieux
- Commune
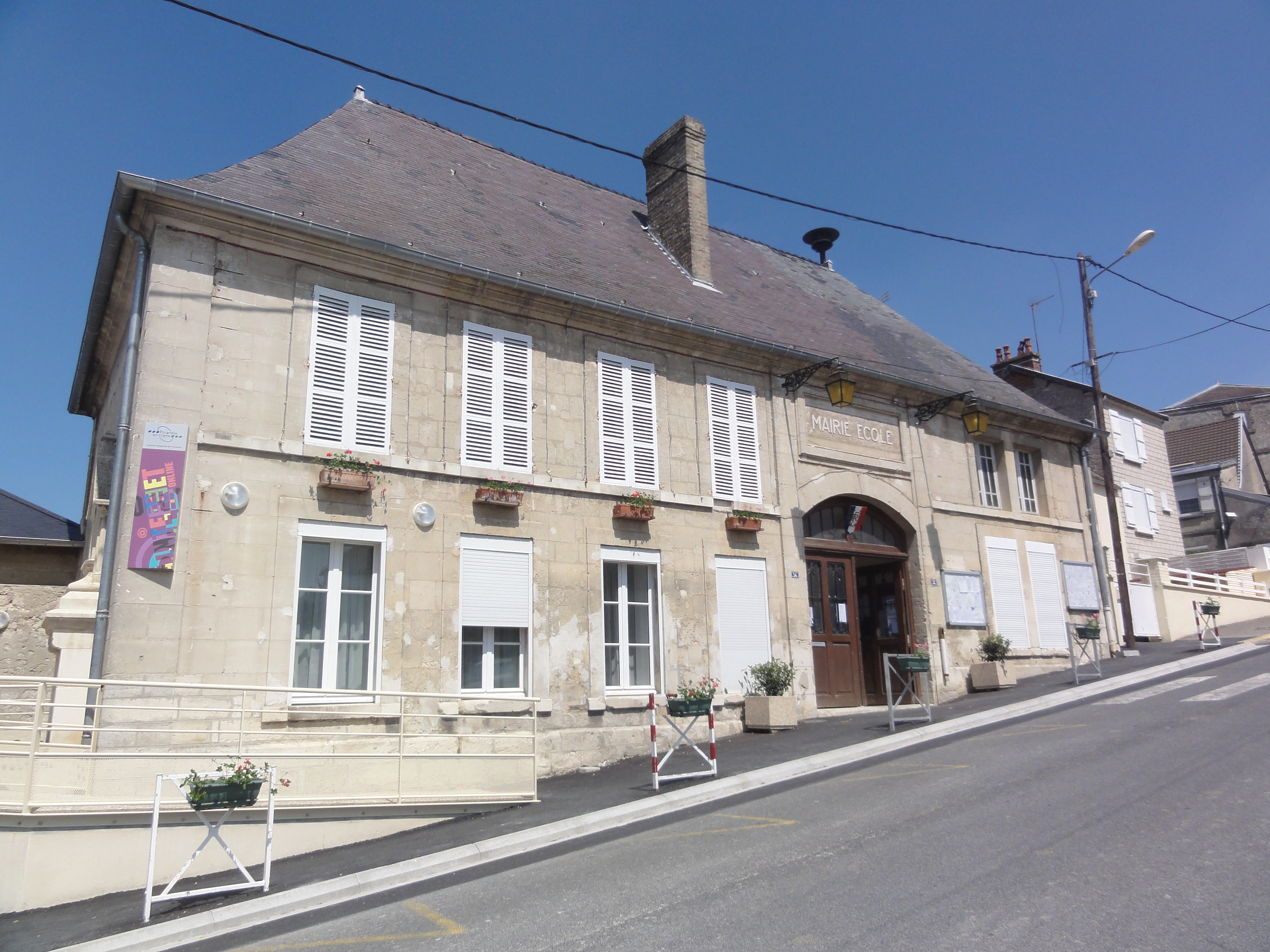
- Town hall
- Location of Beaurieux
- Location within France Location within Hauts-de-France
- Coordinates: 49°23′34″N 3°44′16″E
- Country: France
- Region: Hauts-de-France
- Department: Aisne
- Arrondissement: Laon
- Canton: Villeneuve-sur-Aisne
- Intercommunality: Chemin des Dames

Government
  - Mayor (2026–32): Richard Jannin
- Area^{1}: 9.69 km^{2} (3.74 sq mi)
- Elevation: 165 m (541 ft)
- Highest elevation: 176 m (577 ft)
- Lowest elevation: 46 m (151 ft)
- Population (2023): 794
  - Density: 81.9/km^{2} (212/sq mi)
- Time zone: UTC+01:00 (CET)
  - Summer (DST): UTC+02:00 (CEST)
- INSEE/Postal code: 02058 /02160
- ^{1} French Land Register data, which excludes lakes, ponds, glaciers > 1 km^{2} (0.386 sq mi or 247 acres) and river estuaries.

Beaurieux (French pronunciation: [boʁjø]) is a commune in the département of Aisne in Hauts-de-France in northern France.

At this site, the remnants of an iron-age farm have been excavated by Le Greves. He found that the site was slowly adapted to form a Gallo-Roman villa.

== Population ==
Historical population
Year	Pop.	±% p.a.
1968	566	—
1975	577	+0.28%
1982	652	+1.76%
1990	654	+0.04%
1999	704	+0.82%
2007	793	+1.50%
2012	776	−0.43%
2017	844	+1.69%
2023	794	−1.01%
Source: INSEE
