= Fourmies, Nord =

Fourmies
- Commune
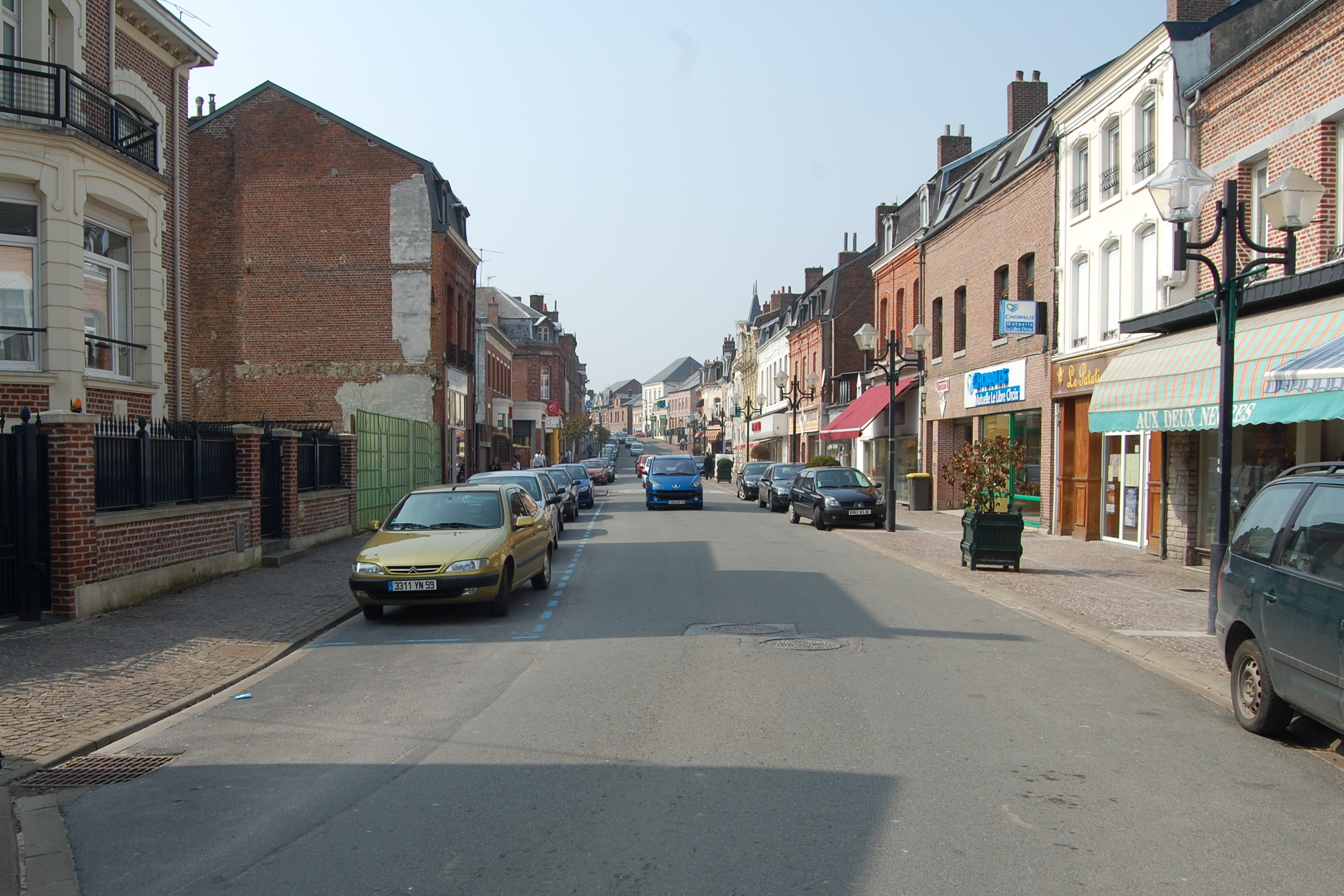
- A view within Fourmies

- Coat of arms
- Location of Fourmies
- Location within France Location within Hauts-de-France
- Coordinates: 50°01′05″N 4°03′14″E
- Country: France
- Region: Hauts-de-France
- Department: Nord
- Arrondissement: Avesnes-sur-Helpe
- Canton: Fourmies
- Intercommunality: CC Sud Avesnois

Government
  - Mayor (2020–2026): Mickaël Hiraux
- Area^{1}: 22.98 km^{2} (8.87 sq mi)
- Elevation: 202 m (663 ft)
- Highest elevation: 247 m (810 ft)
- Lowest elevation: 174 m (571 ft)
- Population (2023): 11,449
  - Density: 498.2/km^{2} (1,290/sq mi)
- Time zone: UTC+01:00 (CET)
  - Summer (DST): UTC+02:00 (CEST)
- INSEE/Postal code: 59249 /59610
- ^{1} French Land Register data, which excludes lakes, ponds, glaciers > 1 km^{2} (0.386 sq mi or 247 acres) and river estuaries.

Fourmies (French pronunciation: [fuʁmi]) is a commune in the Nord department in northern France. The inhabitants are called Fourmisiens. It lies on the river Helpe Mineure (Helpe Minor or Little Helpe). Since 2015, Fourmies has been the seat of the Canton of Fourmies, an administrative division of the Nord department. The canton was created at the French canton reorganization which came into effect in March 2015.

== Geography ==
Fourmies is situated in the Euroregion of Thiérache, a region of Northern France and Southern Belgium. It is 50 km (31 mi) from Valenciennes, 100 km (62 mi) from Lille, and 175 km (109 mi) from Paris. The city is surrounded by forests and ponds.

== History ==
Roman coins have been discovered in Fourmies. In the 11th century, the town was first mentioned under the name "Formeias", which may refer to the swamp area in the valley of the river Helpe Mineure. Since the 12th century, the village has been called Formies, Furmies, Formies, Formiis and Fourmies. At one time it was property of the Avesnes family, and the Liessies Abbey.

Glassworks were created in Fourmies in 1599. They were the first established in northern France.

=== Fusillade de Fourmies - May 1891 ===
May 1, 1891 was the first French and international celebration of International Workers' Day on May Day. Workers in Fourmies faced falling wages and twelve to fifteen hour working days. In Fourmies, troops shot at peaceful strikers: nine died, including eight demonstrators under 21 years old, among whom a young worker who would remain a symbol, Marie Blondeau. Thirty five others were injured in the shooting. Government troops fired upon a peaceful demonstration of workers claiming "C'est les huit heures qu'il nous faut !" (It's the eight-hour day we need!).

The shooting of 1 May in Fourmies evoked strong emotions in France. It is regarded today as one of the founding events of the French Section of the Workers' International. Jean Jaurès visited Fourmies afterwards to make a speech there while Georges Clemenceau declared in front of the French Parliament that "it is the Fourth estate which rose" (« c'est le Quatrième état qui s'est levé ». ).

=== Heraldry ===
Arms of Fourmies	The arms of Fourmies are blazoned : Gules, 3 fesses argent (Croÿ) dimidiated with Bendy Or and gules (Avesnes)

== Population ==
Historical population
Year	Pop.	±% p.a.
1968	15,117	—
1975	15,505	+0.36%
1982	15,242	−0.24%
1990	14,505	−0.62%
1999	13,867	−0.50%
2007	13,233	−0.58%
2012	12,663	−0.88%
2017	11,727	−1.52%
2023	11,449	−0.40%
Source: INSEE

== Events ==
- Every year, since 1928, the city hosts the Grand Prix de Fourmies, a professional cycle race.
- The music festival (fête de la musique)
- The traditional fun fair (traditionnelle fête foraine) attracts many people each summer.

== Economy ==
Medtronic has an assembly plant in Fourmies.

== Transportation ==
Fourmies is on the rail line between Lille and Hirson. The SNCF station (Gare de Formies) is served by the TER Nord-Pas-de-Calais.

It is planned to be crossed by the Trans-European Cycle Route Paris-Moscow knowns as EV3 The Pilgrims Route.

The Arc-en-Ciel (réseau interurbain du Nord) interurban departmental network in Hauts de France Nord provides bus service to the city of Fourmies in the 4 region (lines 402 express, 402, 433, 438 and 439).

== Twin towns – sister cities ==
Fourmies is twinned with:

- Fridley, United States (1978)
- Bernburg, Germany (1967)

== See also ==
- Communes of the Nord department
