= Maubeuge-Fourmies rail line =

French railway line

The Maubeuge-Fourmies rail line was a French non-electrified, single track railway line, inaugurated August 29, 1885 between Maubeuge station and Fourmies. The line started as branch line for industrial use that was commissioned on October 29, 1860.

It is line No. 240 000 of the French national railway network.

== History ==
Pierre François Dumont, a French industrialist, built blast furnaces in Ferrière-la-Grande, but was having difficulty delivering his product, mostly due to the poor state of roads in the region. He sought permission to build a branch line that would link his factories to the station at Maubeuge. Following a decree of April 23, 1859, a prefectural decree dated January 14, 1860 was given which provided for the creation of a station at Ferrière-la-Grande and a judgment of the Avesnes court on the expropriation of land for the public good on March 28, 1860, the industrialist started building (at his own cost), the portion of the line from Maubeuge to Ferrière-la-Grande. Construction work first took place on October 29, 1860. This branch line marked the beginning of the eventual Maubeuge - Fourmies line.

On April 9, 1861, the Maubeuge - Ferrière-la-Grande "industrial railway line" was put into service.

The line from Erquelinnes to Fourmies was granted by an agreement signed May 22, 1869 between the Minister of Public Works and Messrs Anatole de Melun, tale Charles Werner de Mérode, Louis Dupont, Florimond de Coussemaker, Isidore-David Portau, Benjamin Labarbe. This agreement was approved on the same date by an imperial decree. The concessionaires then formed the Compagnie des chemins de fer du Nord-Est that replaced them as legal parties to the agreement.

A law dated September 15, 1871 made a declaration of public utility and gave the final concession to the Compagnie des chemins de fer du Nord-Est for the construction of a railway line, starting at a point located between Erquelinnes and Jeumont, terminating at Fourmies or Anor and going through Cousolre, Solre-le-Château, Liessies and Trélon. Two routes were then studied. The first left from Erquelinnes (B) station. It had the disadvantage of crossing Belgian territory over 6 km and requiring a customs office. The second left from Jeumont station to reach Solre-le-Château via Colleret, Cousolre, Aibes and Bérelles. This line would find reservations with the military authorities because, according to them, it represented serious danger in the event of an invasion across the Belgian border.

A law dated December 25, 1878 proposed a third path which had the line beginning at Maubeuge and heading towards Solre-le-Château through Ferrière-la-Grande, Cousolre and Hestrud. Here too, the army had serious reservations.

For military reasons but also as a result of numerous interventions by local elected officials and industrialists, a law was enacted on July 22, 1881 that modified the route and designated Maubeuge as the start of the line which would join Fourmies, terminus station, via Solre-le-Château. The town of Cousolre would be served by a branch line starting at Ferrière-la-Grande. Construction started in September 1881, first on the Solre-le-Château - Fourmies section of line and would continue for the next four years.

The line from Maubeuge to Fourmies, including the Cousolre branch, is part of the Compagnie des chemins de fer du Nord's network under the terms of an agreement signed between the company and the Minister of Public Works on June 5, 1883. This agreement was given formal approval in a law signed on November 20, 1883. However, the Compagnie des chemins de fer du Nord would only gain full ownership of the line following a treaty signed with the Compagnie des chemins de fer du Nord-Est on March 30, 1889 and approved by law on February 7, 1890.

Work on the line was completed on August 20, 1885. On August 29 of that same year, the single-track rail line from Maubeuge to Fourmies was inaugurated. Present at the opening were Charles Demole, Minister of Public Works and Pierre Legrand, Minister of Commerce. The line departs from the Paris - Liège international artery at Maubeuge station, following the course of Solre river towards Rousies, La Machine (serving Ferrière-la-Grande), Ferrière-la-Grande station and heads south towards Ferrière-la-Petite, Obrechies, Dimechaux and Dimont, before turning east at Sars-Poteries station to head towards Lez-Fontaine and Solre-le-Château. The line would then follow a north–south orientation serving Liessies (as a flag stop), Trélon-Glageon station, Couplevoie (a hamlet of Glageon), then joining the Lille - Hirson line before arriving at Fourmies.

Commercial use of the line started on September 1, 1885. Passenger service also started in 1885 with four daily return trips between Maubeuge and Fourmies. The trip took around an hour and ten minutes to complete, with an average speed of 34 km/h. On Saturday, October 3, 1885, the Ferrière-la-Grande - Cousolre line opened. The branch line went through Cerfontaine, Colleret, Quiévelon and Aibes. On October 4, 1885, the line from Ferrière-la-Grande to Cousolre was officially opened for traffic. Passenger service ended on July 1, 1939; the only stop between Ferrière-la-Grande and Cousolre was at Colleret.

The station at Rousies was the last one built along the line in 1890.

At Sars-Poteries, a junction was added to the Avesnes-Sars-Poteries line, opening in July 1901.

The station at Rousies was destroyed on September 18, 1914. It was rebuilt in 1921.

In 1945, service in the Nord region was limited to two return trips, including a bi-weekly trip. After 1945, Series 230 A and 230 D were used for passenger service, freight service using Series 140 G and 040 D. In 1948 service returned to three daily Maubeuge - Hirson rotations plus an additional Fourmies - Sars-Poteries shuttle in the evening.

Midday service was terminated on Mondays, Tuesdays, Thursdays and Fridays in 1952. In 1958 two of the trips were provided by railcars, the third trip remained by light rail, in the evening, departing from Maubeuge, arriving in the morning. In 1963, BB 63000 and 63500 were used on the line. Starting on May 26, 1968, railcars were sufficient to cover the three daily services. A victim of ever increasing personal vehicle usage, passenger service along the entire line ended on September 28, 1969. There was also very little freight traffic along this central part of the line, the Lille segment to which the line was attached in 1972, closed on April 3 following the Ferrière-la Petite - Trélon-Glageon section.

The line was officially downgraded on March 8, 1975 and the track was removed between Ferrière-la-Petite and Sars-Poteries. The track between Sars-Poteries and Trélon was purchased by the Conseil Général du Nord for the creation of a tourist train. The Sambre-Avesnois railway association became involved in the project in 1983, and by 1989, after having acquired a railcar, restarted the tourist railway project. Unfortunately, this project never got off the ground. A rail trail association "Autour du sentier Emeraude" was created at this time.

Dismantling of the tracks took place in 1996 and the station at Rousies was demolished a year later; it was the last station built on the line and was the first to be taken down.

== Tourism along the line ==
In October 2003 a rail-trail was opened along the former trackage in the area, named the Emeraude Trail. This was later expanded from Ferrière-la-Grande to Glageon and the Emeraude Trail was incorporated into Avesnois Greenway system.

The greenway is reserved for non-motorized vehicle usage, including bicycles and pedestrial traffic. The line is included in the European long-distance cycling route EuroVelo 3, known as the Pilgrims Route, linking Trondheim, Norway with Santiago de Compostela in Spain.

== Additional Sources ==
- Jacques Guillot, member of the Sambre-Avesnois (Maubeuge) Railway Association
- Les Racines De Florentine de Bernard Fosse - Chemins de fer du Nord et ses tramways

=== External links ===
- Map of the former rail network in the Nord-Pas de Calais region
- Maubeuge - Fourmies line (site)
