= Fagne (natural region) =

Area on the border of Belgium and France

Coordinates: 50°11′44″N 4°43′46″E

Map of the Fagne in south-western Belgium

The Fagne (French; lit. 'fen') is a natural region in Belgium and France which is sometimes grouped with Famenne as Fagne-Famenne. It should not be confused with the High Fens (French: Hautes Fagnes), which are further east and straddle the border of Belgium and Germany.

== Etymology ==
The word Fagne comes from the Walloon language, and means "swampy ground". This term comes from the Old Low Franconian *fanja 'mud', in turn coming from the Gothic fani 'mud'. The English term 'fen' is a cognate. The Haute Fagnes in eastern Belgium share the same etymology.

== Geography ==
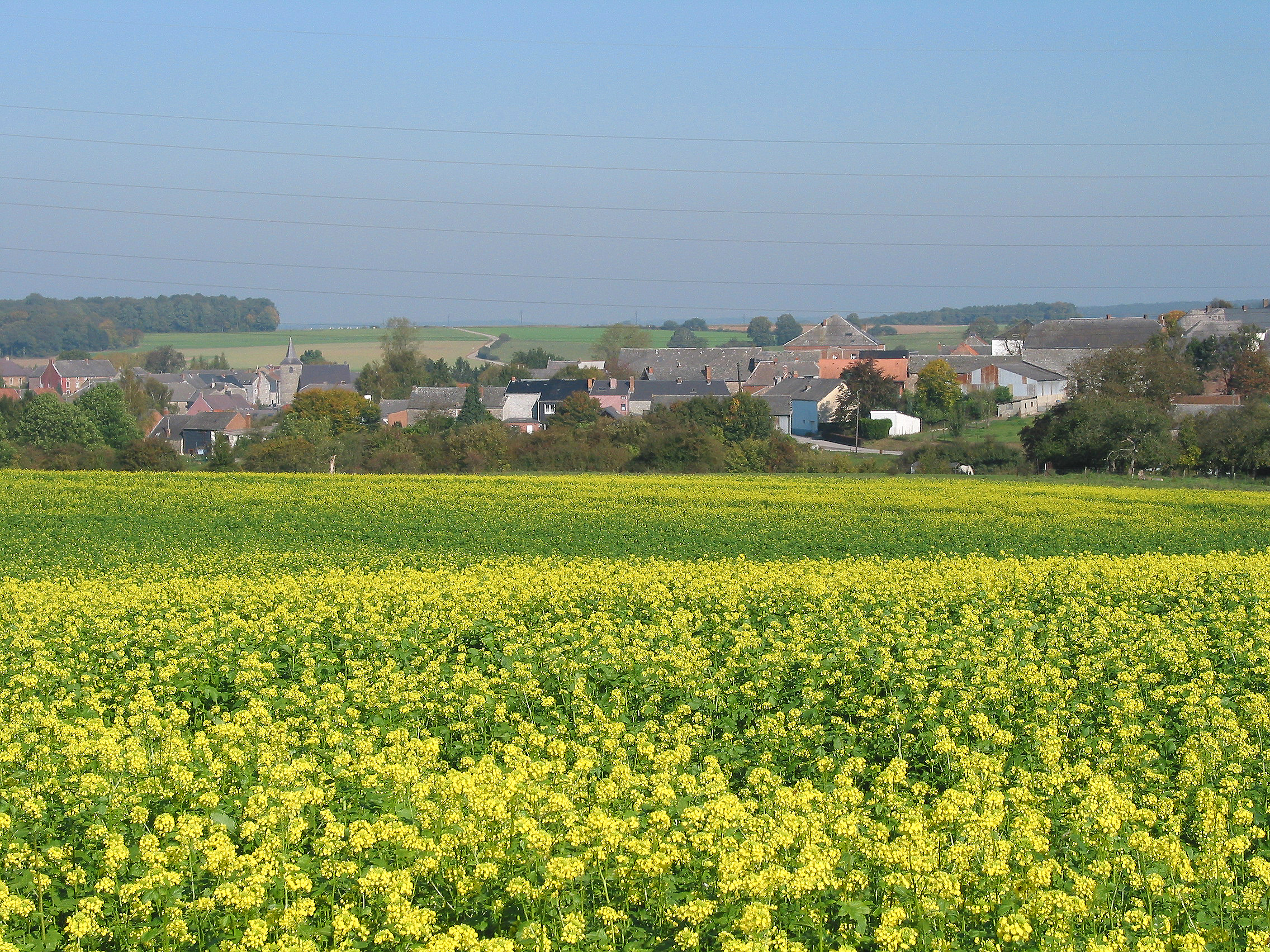
View of the countryside near Daussois (Cerfontaine) in the Fagne

The Fagne is mostly in the provinces of Namur and Hainaut in Wallonia in southern Belgium. It extends west into the French Arrondissement of Avesnes-sur-Helpe in the Nord department, in the Nord-Pas de Calais region. It is bounded on the east by the river Meuse, east of the natural region of Famenne which is similar to the Fagne both geographically and naturally. To the north of both lies the Condroz natural region. The Fagne and Famennes are at the western edge of the Ardennes mountain range.

Philippeville is the largest and most important town in The Fagne, and considered an unofficial capital of sorts. Other settlements of note include Couvin, Cerfontaine, Rance, Trélon and Solre-le-Château.
