= Fagne =

Fagne (French: fen) or Fagnes can refer to:

- Fagne, a natural region in southern Belgium and northern France, sometimes grouped with Famenne as Fagne-Famenne.
- The High Fens (French: Hautes Fagnes), a marshy area in eastern Belgium and western Germany.
- 1593 Fagnes, an asteroid.
