= La Flamengrie =

La Flamengrie may refer to the following places in France:

- La Flamengrie, Aisne, a commune in the department of Aisne
- La Flamengrie, Nord, a commune in the department of Nord
