= Étrœungt =

- Commune
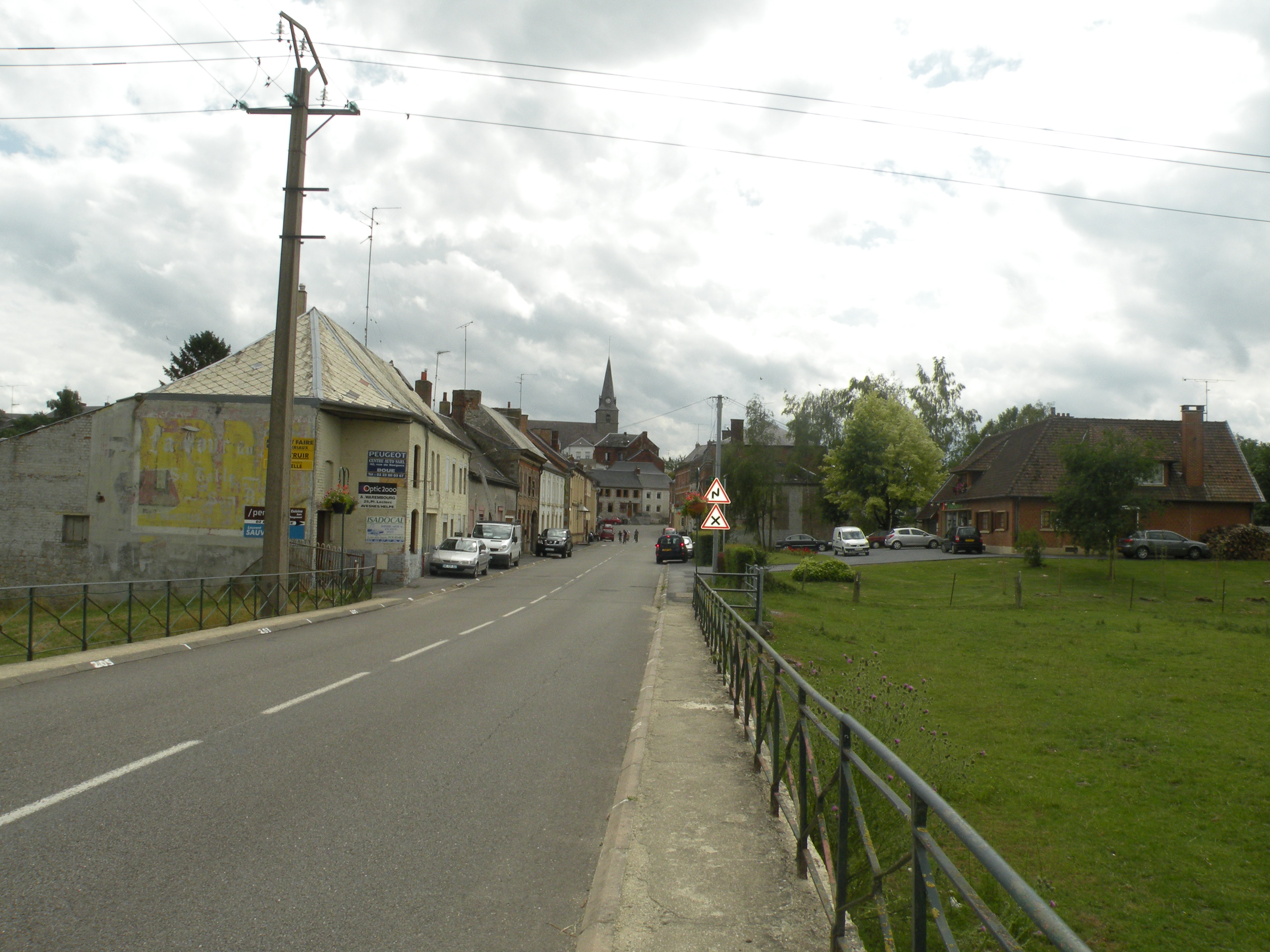
- A view within Étrœungt

- Coat of arms
- Location of Étrœungt
- Location within France Location within Hauts-de-France
- Coordinates: 50°03′29″N 3°55′42″E
- Country: France
- Region: Hauts-de-France
- Department: Nord
- Arrondissement: Avesnes-sur-Helpe
- Canton: Avesnes-sur-Helpe
- Intercommunality: Cœur de l'Avesnois

Government
  - Mayor (2020–2026): Vincent Justice
- Area^{1}: 25.1 km^{2} (9.7 sq mi)
- Highest elevation: 217 m (712 ft)
- Lowest elevation: 148 m (486 ft)
- Population (2023): 1,233
  - Density: 49.1/km^{2} (127/sq mi)
- Time zone: UTC+01:00 (CET)
  - Summer (DST): UTC+02:00 (CEST)
- INSEE/Postal code: 59218 /59219
- ^{1} French Land Register data, which excludes lakes, ponds, glaciers > 1 km^{2} (0.386 sq mi or 247 acres) and river estuaries.

Étrœungt (French pronunciation: [e.tʁœ̃]) is a commune in the Nord department in northern France.

== Geography ==
The river Helpe Mineure (one of Sambre's affluents) runs through the village. The river is subject to occasional flooding. Étrœungt is bordered by ten other communes, including two from Aisne department: Avesnelles, Boulogne-sur-Helpe, Féron, Floyon, Haut-Lieu, La Flamengrie (Aisne), Larouillies, Rainsars, Rocquigny (Aisne), Sémeries. The nearest train station is (SNCF) Avesnes-sur-Helpe. It is 110 km from Lille (Préfecture du Nord), Brussels and Reims (Marne); 55 km from Valenciennes, Laon, Mons and Charleroi; 22 km from Maubeuge; 10 km from Fourmies and 7 km from Avesnes-sur-Helpe. Highways leading to Étrœungt are the RN2 from Paris to Brussels. Belgium is just 15 km away.

== Heraldry ==
Arms of Étrœungt	The arms of Étrœungt are blazoned : Quarterly 1&4: Argent, 3 fesses gules; 2&3: Argent, 3 wagoner's axes top 2 addorsed gules. (Bermerain, Étrœungt, Féron, Ferrière-la-Grande, Lez-Fontaine, Rousies, Solre-le-Château and Solrinnes use the same arms.)

== Gallery ==
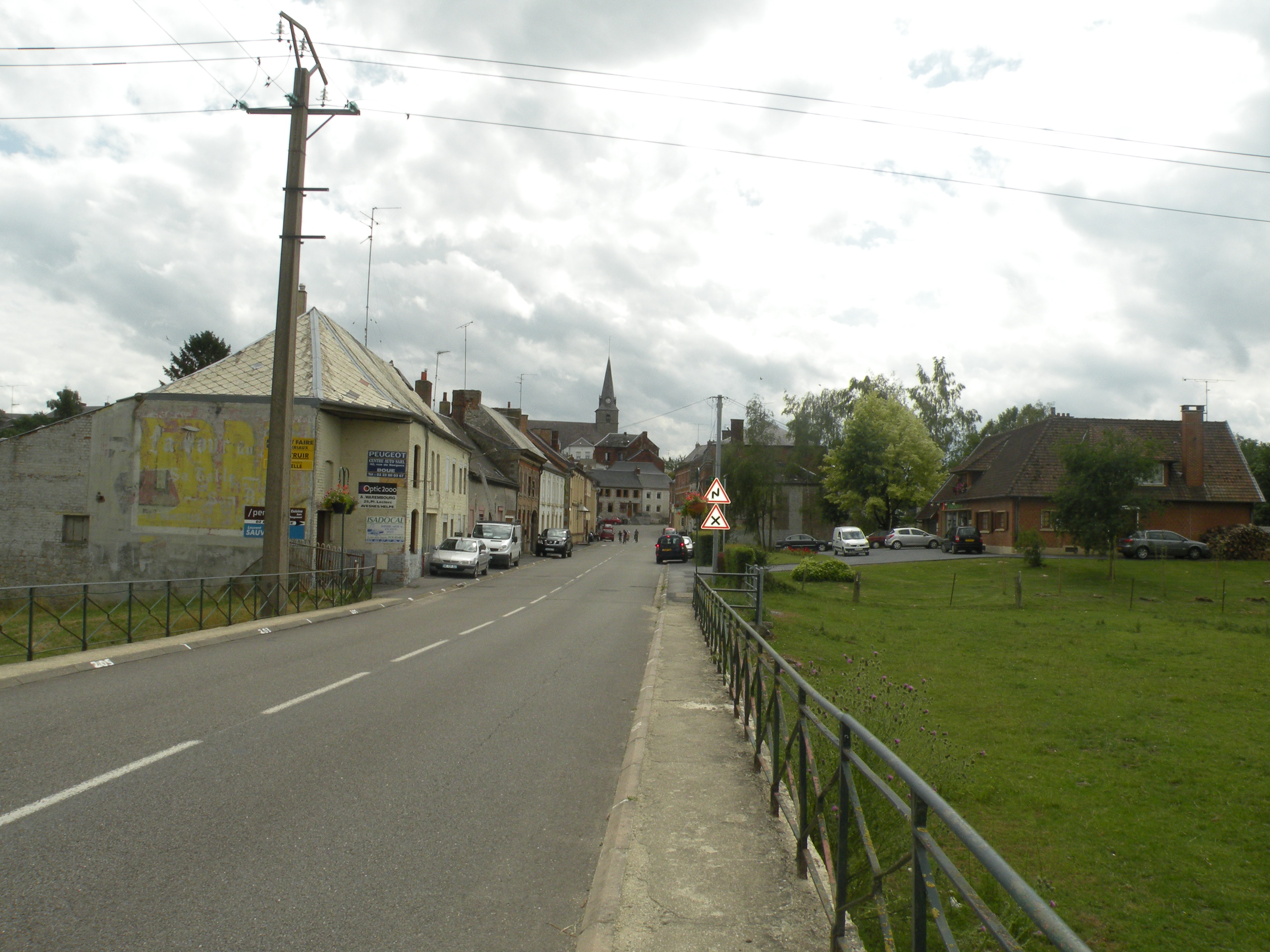
Road

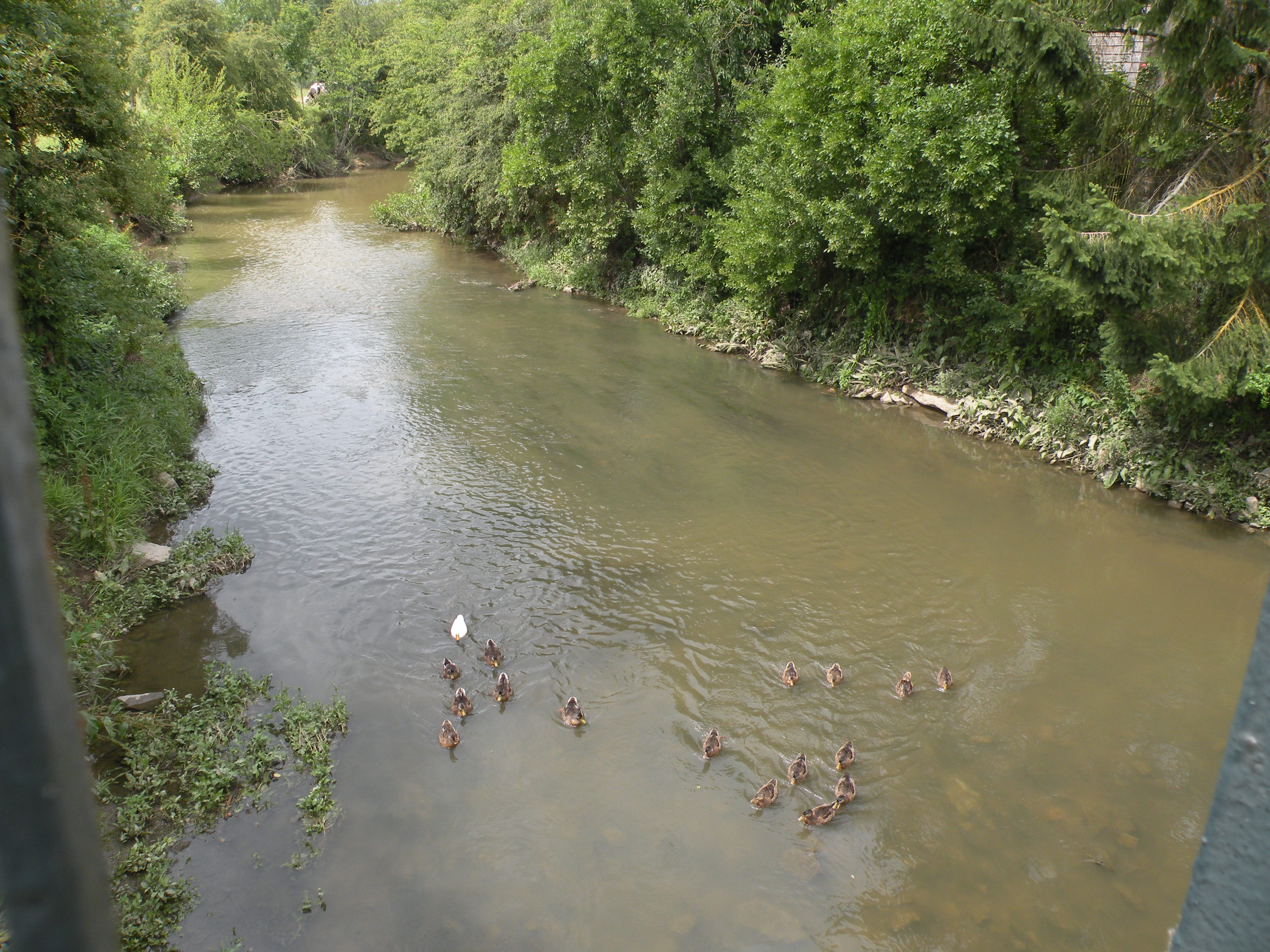

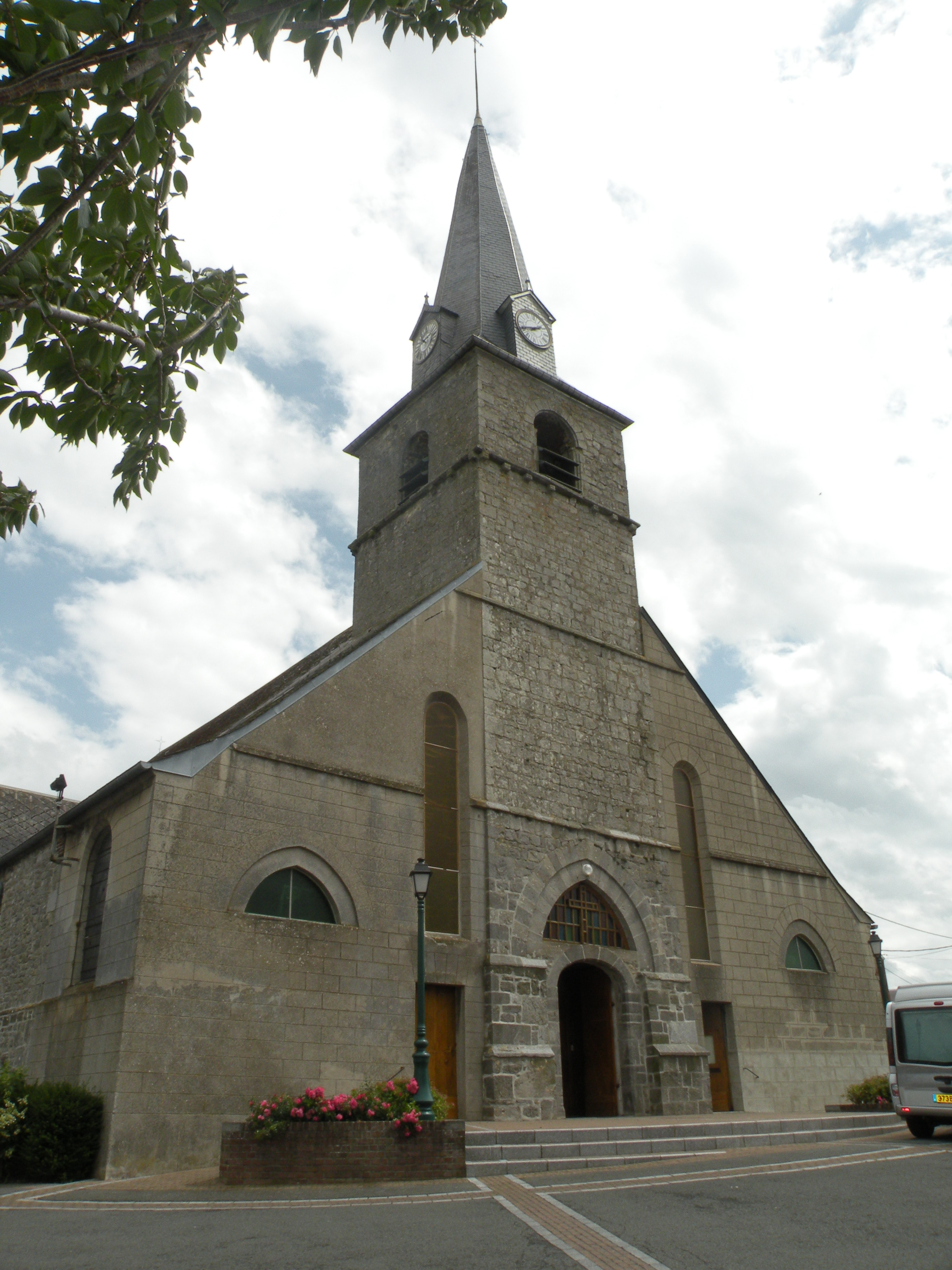
Étrœungt Church

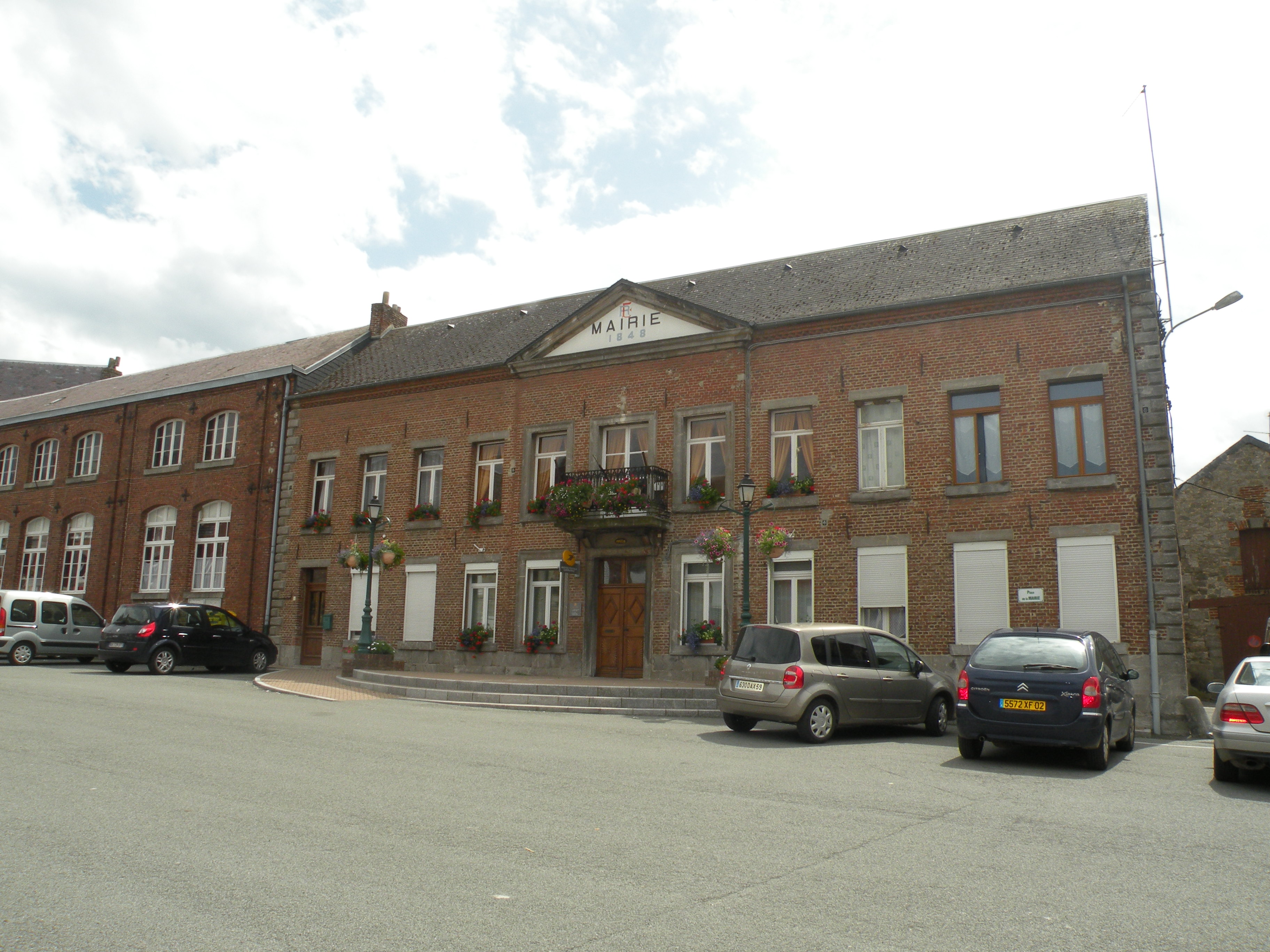
Town Hall

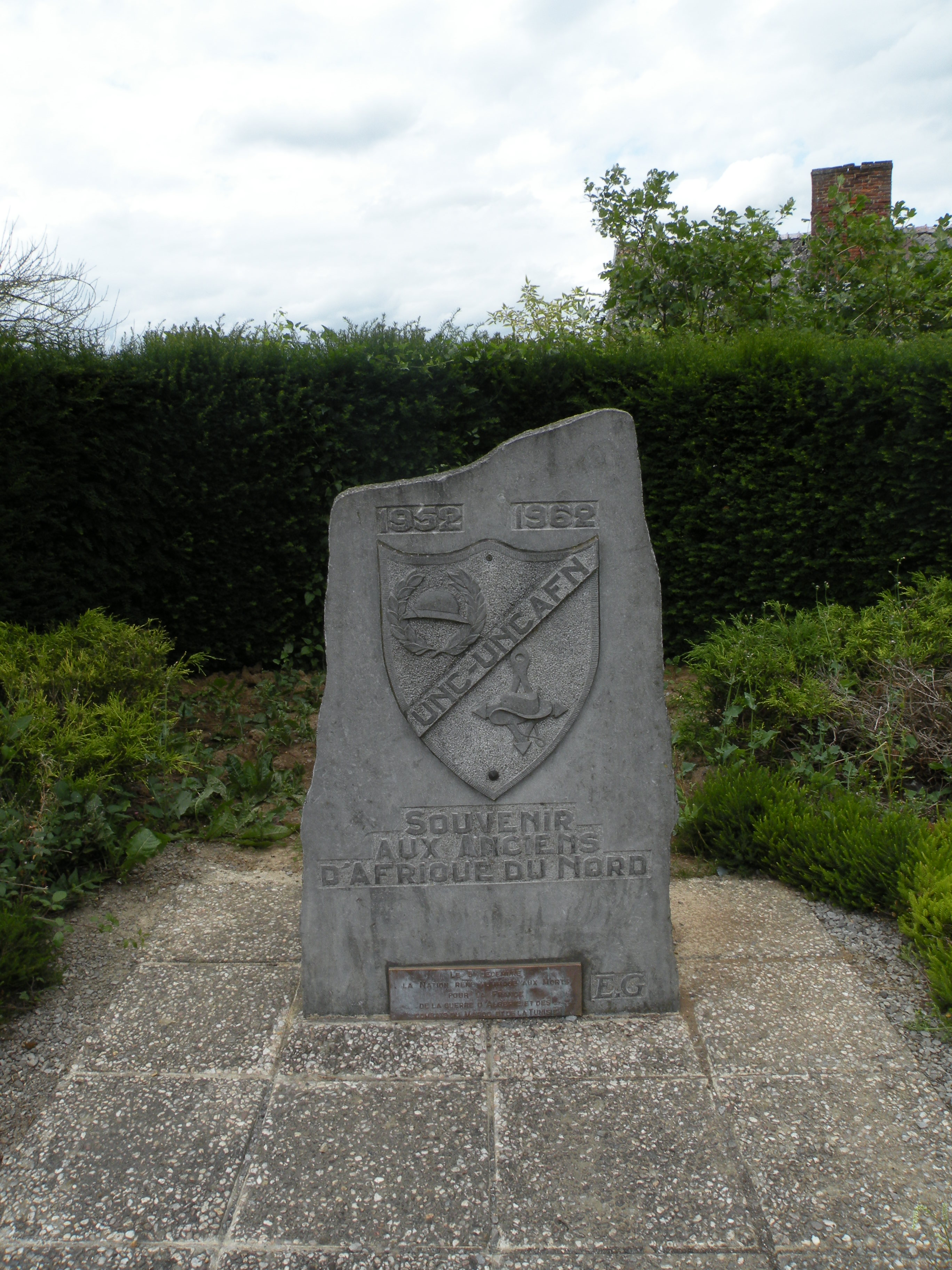
Memorial to the Algerian War Casualties

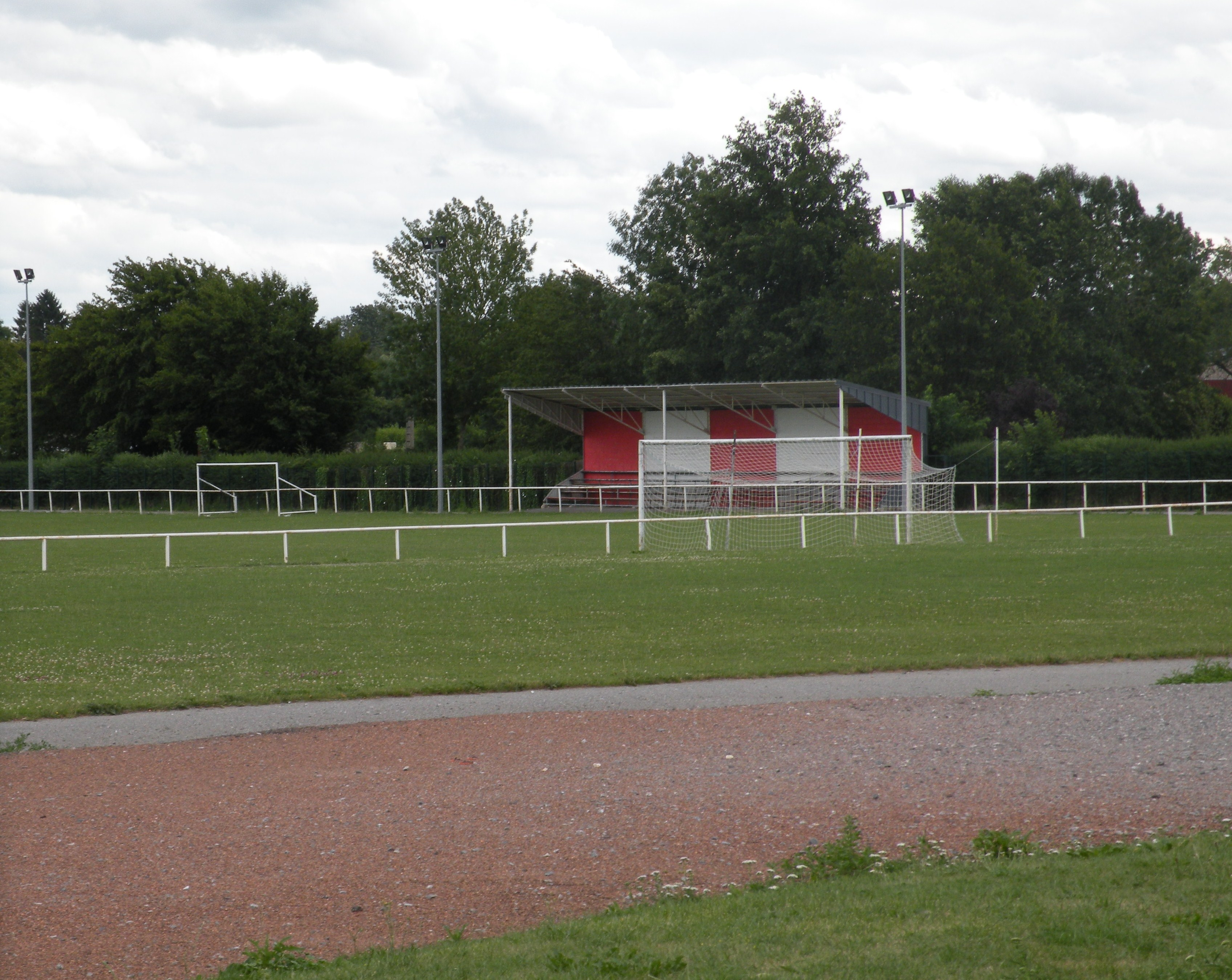
Stadium

== See also ==
- Communes of the Nord department
