= Pierre Dumont =

Pierre Dumont may refer to:

- Pierre Dumont (painter) (1884–1936), French painter
- Pierre Dumont (sculptor) (1650–?), French sculptor
- Pierre Étienne Louis Dumont (1759–1829), French/Swiss political writer
- Pierre François Dumont (1789–1864), French industrialist
- Pierre-Henri Dumont (born 1987), French politician
