= Famenne =

Natural region of Belgium

Coordinates: 50.26°N 5.4°E

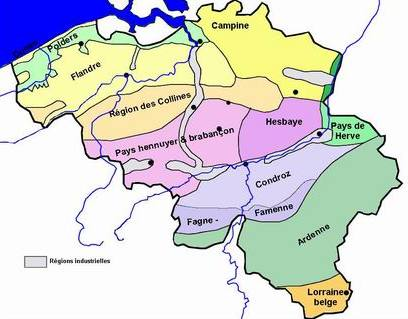
The natural regions of Belgium Condroz Fagne-Fammene

Famenne (French: [famɛn]; Walloon: Fåmene [fɑːmɛn]) is a natural region in Wallonia (southern Belgium). Together with the Fagne to the west which is geographically similar, it is often considered part of a wider natural region called the Fagne-Famenne.

== Etymology ==
The hypothesis that the name of the Famenne region may derive from Paemani, an ancient Germanic tribe, following the influence of the Germanic sound shift from p- to f-, is now considered doubtful by most scholars.

In the first medieval mentions, the Famenne is spelled in Latin in forms with an "l", for example Falmenna.

== Geography ==
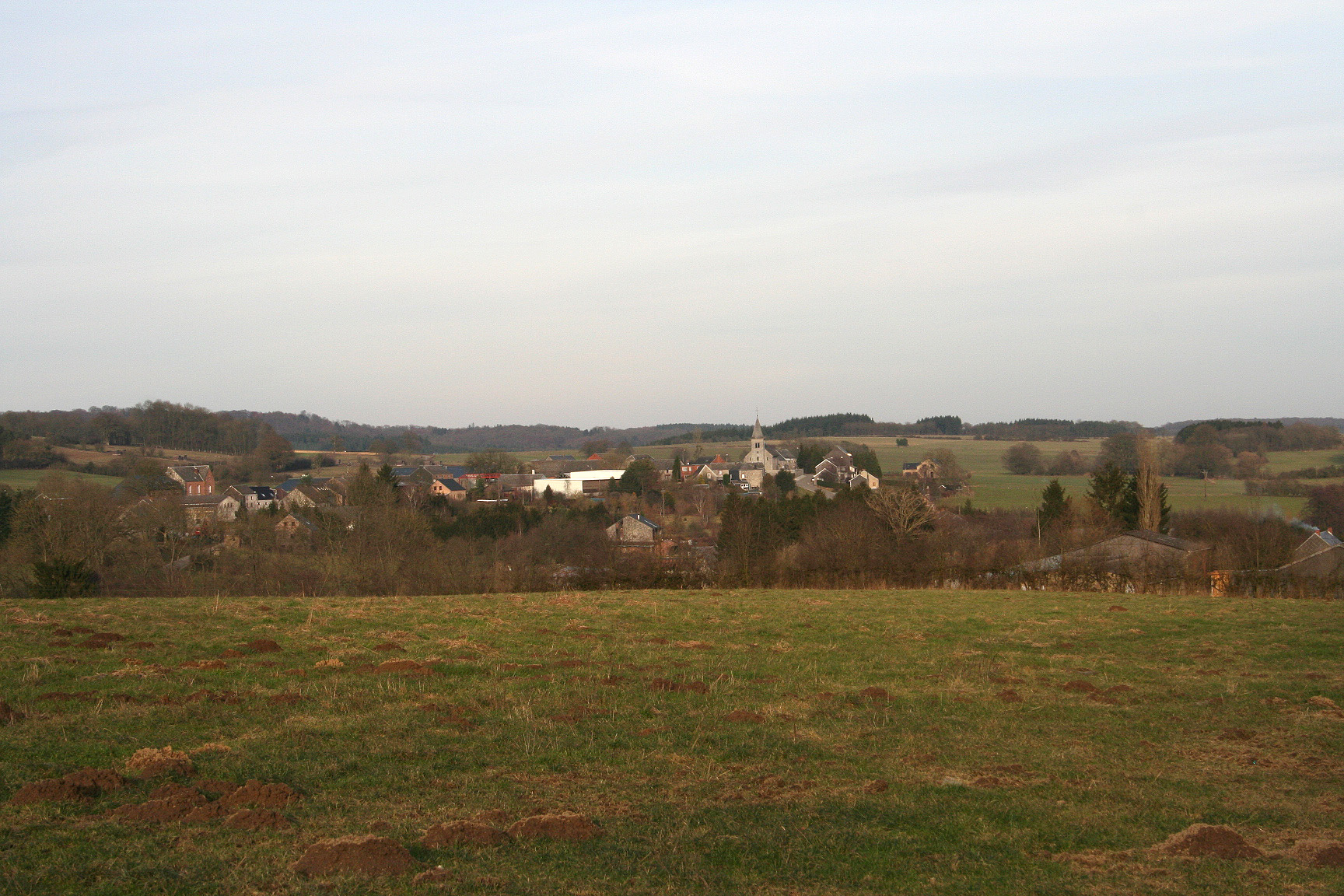
View of the village of Nettinne in the Famenne region

=== Natural geography ===
Famenne is mostly in the provinces of Namur and Luxembourg in Wallonia in southern Belgium. Its northeastern tip extends into the province of Liège. It is bounded on the west by the river Meuse, west of which lies Fagne, similar to Famenne both geographically and naturally. To the north of both lies the Condroz natural region. Famenne is at the western edge of the Ardennes mountain range.

Famenne is traversed by the Calestienne, a band of limestone resulting in calcium-rich soil and a corresponding concentration of calcicole plants. The rivers Lesse and Lomme cross the Calestienne, forming substantial cave systems. The caves of Han-sur-Lesse, the caves of Hotton and Rochefort's Lorette cave are the most notable examples.

=== Human geography ===
The most important city and unofficial capital of Famenne is Marche-en-Famenne. Other towns include Beauraing, Rochefort, Hotton and Durbuy.

== Economy ==
The agriculture and forestry sectors are the main sources of employment in the region, although tourism also plays an important role.
