= Féron =

- Commune
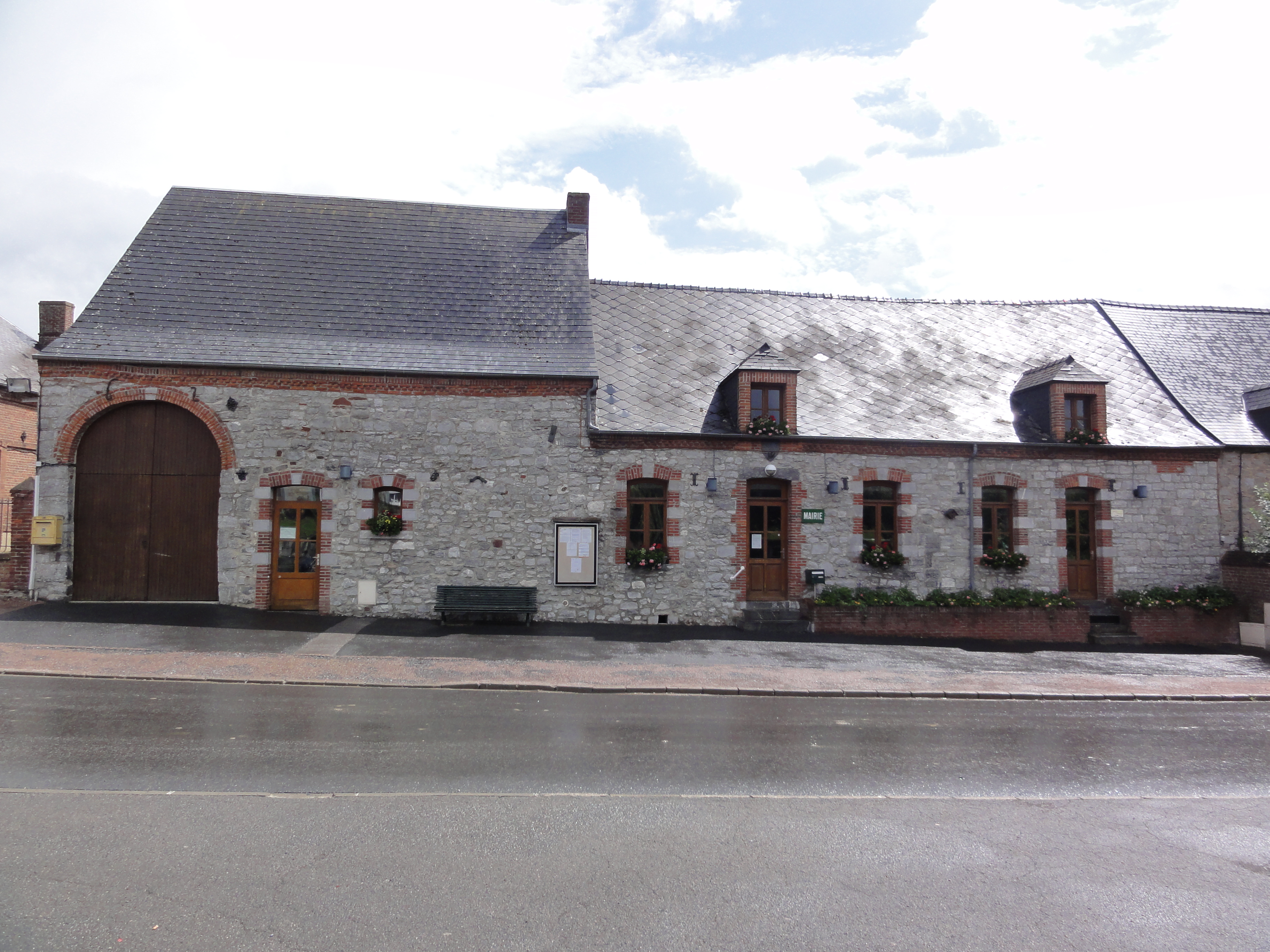
- The town hall in Féron

- Coat of arms
- Location of Féron
- Location within France Location within Hauts-de-France
- Coordinates: 50°02′48″N 4°01′32″E
- Country: France
- Region: Hauts-de-France
- Department: Nord
- Arrondissement: Avesnes-sur-Helpe
- Canton: Fourmies
- Intercommunality: Sud Avesnois

Government
  - Mayor (2020–2026): Jean-François Baudry
- Area^{1}: 13.39 km^{2} (5.17 sq mi)
- Elevation: 172 m (564 ft)
- Highest elevation: 223 m (732 ft)
- Lowest elevation: 158 m (518 ft)
- Population (2023): 514
  - Density: 38.4/km^{2} (99.4/sq mi)
- Time zone: UTC+01:00 (CET)
  - Summer (DST): UTC+02:00 (CEST)
- INSEE/Postal code: 59229 /59610
- ^{1} French Land Register data, which excludes lakes, ponds, glaciers > 1 km^{2} (0.386 sq mi or 247 acres) and river estuaries.

Féron (French pronunciation: [feʁɔ̃]) is a commune in the Nord department in northern France.

It is around 3 km (1.9 mi) north of Fourmies. Its population in 2019 was 564. The current mayor, elected in 2020, is Jean-François Baudry. There is an annual festival "Féron'Arts".

== Heraldry ==
Arms of Féron	The arms of Féron are blazoned : Quarterly 1&4: Argent, 3 fesses gules; 2&3: Argent, 3 wagoner's axes top 2 addorsed gules. (Bermerain, Étrœungt, Féron, Ferrière-la-Grande, Lez-Fontaine, Rousies, Solre-le-Château and Solrinnes use the same arms.)

== See also ==
- Communes of the Nord department
