= Eau d'Heure lakes =

Complex of five artificial lakes in Belgium

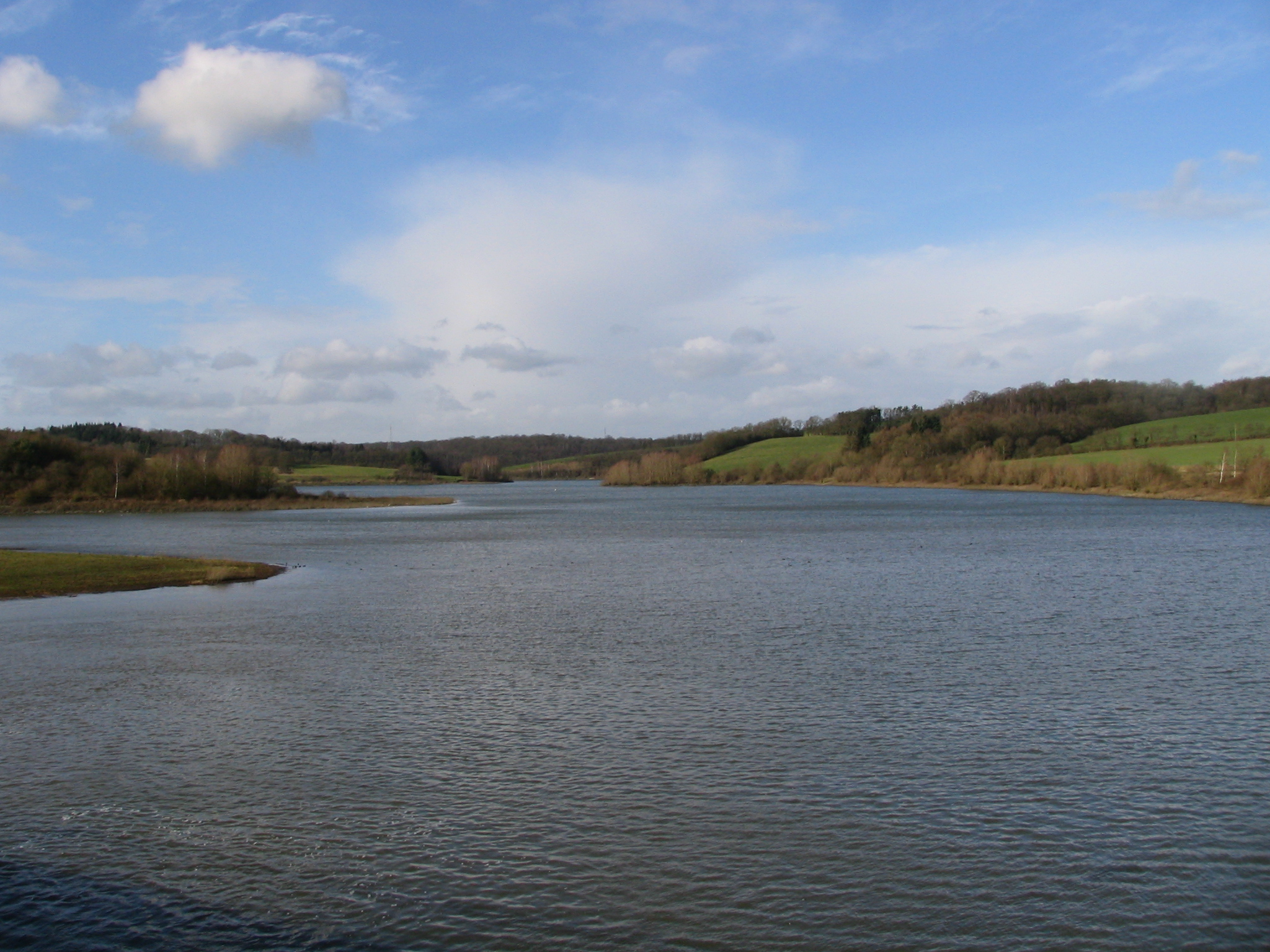

- Location within Belgium
- Coordinates: 50°11′01″N 04°22′10″E
- Type: artificial lake
- Basin countries: Wallonia, Belgium
- Max. length: 4 km (2.5 mi)
- Max. width: 2 km (1.2 mi)
- Surface area: 6.17 km^{2} (2.38 sq mi)
- Max. depth: 43 m (141 ft)
- Water volume: 86,000,000 m^{3} (70,000 acre⋅ft)
- Shore length^{1}: 50 km (31 mi)
- Surface elevation: 243 m (797 ft)
- Islands: 1
- Settlements: Cerfontaine
- ^{1} Shore length is not a well-defined measure.

The Eau d'Heure lakes (French: lacs de l'Eau d'Heure) is a complex of five artificial lakes in Wallonia, forming the largest lake area in Belgium.

The dams were built during the 1970s. The lakes are not far from the village of Cerfontaine, 50 kilometres (31 mi) south of the city of Charleroi, and 15 km east of the border with France. They are within the municipalities of Cerfontaine (province of Namur) and Froidchapelle (province of Hainaut).

The primary river feeding the lakes is the Eau d'Heure. There are five dams and one hydro-electric power station. The largest lake, the Lac de la Plate Taille, is itself the largest single lake in the country, at 3.74 square kilometres (1.44 mi^{2}), while together the lakes have a surface area of 6.17 square kilometres (2.38 mi^{2}).

It is a popular tourist attraction, with water sports, including fishing, kayaking, diving and windsurfing.

The five lakes are:

- Lac de l'Eau d'Heure, the central lake of the complex
- Lac de Falemprise, a medium-sized lake to the south-east
- Lac de Féronval, a small lake at the north end of Lac de l'Eau d'Heure
- Lac de la Plate Taille, the largest lake at 3.74 square kilometres (1.44 mi^{2}), at the south-west of the group
- Lac du Ry Jaune (sometimes spelled Ri Jaune), a small lake on the east side
