= List of protected heritage sites in Cerfontaine, Belgium =

This table shows an overview of the protected heritage sites in the Walloon town Cerfontaine, Belgium. This list is part of Belgium's national heritage.

Object	Year/architect	Town/section	Address	Coordinates	Number^{?}	Image
The church of Saint-Vaast at Daussois and the wall around the cemetery ^{(nl)} ^{(fr)}		Cerfontaine		50.221638°N 4.454628°E	93010-CLT-0001-01 Info	
Castle of Senzeilles ^{(nl)} ^{(fr)}		Cerfontaine		50.176582°N 4.461346°E	93010-CLT-0002-01 Info	Het kasteel te Senzeilles
The train station of Cerfontaine, platform, access ramps and stairs with the retaining wall ^{(nl)} ^{(fr)}		Cerfontaine		50.170877°N 4.409092°E	93010-CLT-0003-01 Info	Het station van Cerfontaine, het platform, de toegangstrappen met hellingen en de keermuur
The quarry of the Beau Chateau and its surroundings in Senzeilles ^{(nl)} ^{(fr)}		Cerfontaine		50.162609°N 4.474915°E	93010-CLT-0004-01 Info	
The music pavilion on the Molenweg (rue du Moulin) in Cerfontaine, its retaining walls and the wrought iron railings around the area of the pavilion (M) and the square where it is situated (ZP) ^{(nl)} ^{(fr)}		Cerfontaine	rue du Moulin	50.171566°N 4.413347°E	93010-CLT-0005-01 Info	Het muziekpaviljoen aan de Molenweg (rue du Moulin) in Cerfontaine, haar keermuren en de smeedijzeren balustrades om het gebied van het paviljoen (M) en het plein waar het paviljoe ligt (ZP)

== See also ==
- List of protected heritage sites in Namur (province)
- Cerfontaine, Belgium
