= Daussois =

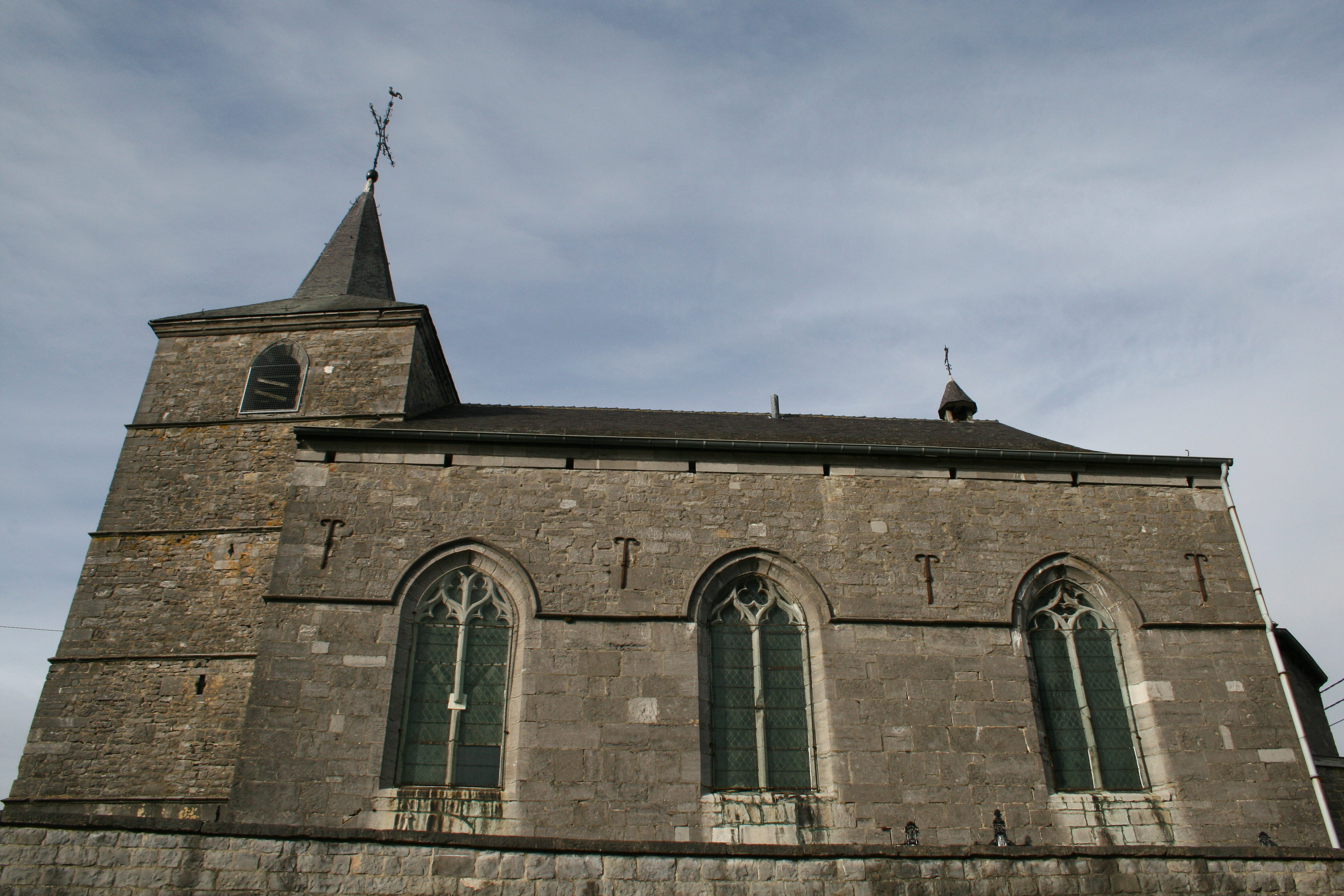
- The church of Saint Vedast, Daussois

- Location within Belgium Location within Europe
- Coordinates: 50°13′18″N 04°27′06″E
- Country: Belgium
- Region: Wallonia
- Province: Namur
- Municipality: Cerfontaine

Daussois (in Walloon, Dausseu) is a village of Wallonia in the municipality of Cerfontaine, located in the province of Namur, Belgium. It has 552 inhabitants, as of January 2024.

Daussois is situated at the center of the Entre-Sambre-et-Meuse region, which is not an administrative region; its borders are not clearly defined, but it includes villages that are south of the Sambre River and north of the Meuse.

Nearby villages include Vogenée and Yves-Gomezée to the south, Silenrieux to the east, Villers-deux-Églises and Soumoy to the north, and Jamiolle to the west.

In the Middle Ages, the village was part of the County of Hainaut, and later it briefly belonged to France. The village has been burnt down twice: in 1794 by French troops during the French Revolutionary Wars, and in 1914 by German troops during World War I. The village church, dedicated to Saint Vedast, is largely from the early 16th century and Gothic in style.
