= Solre =

River in France

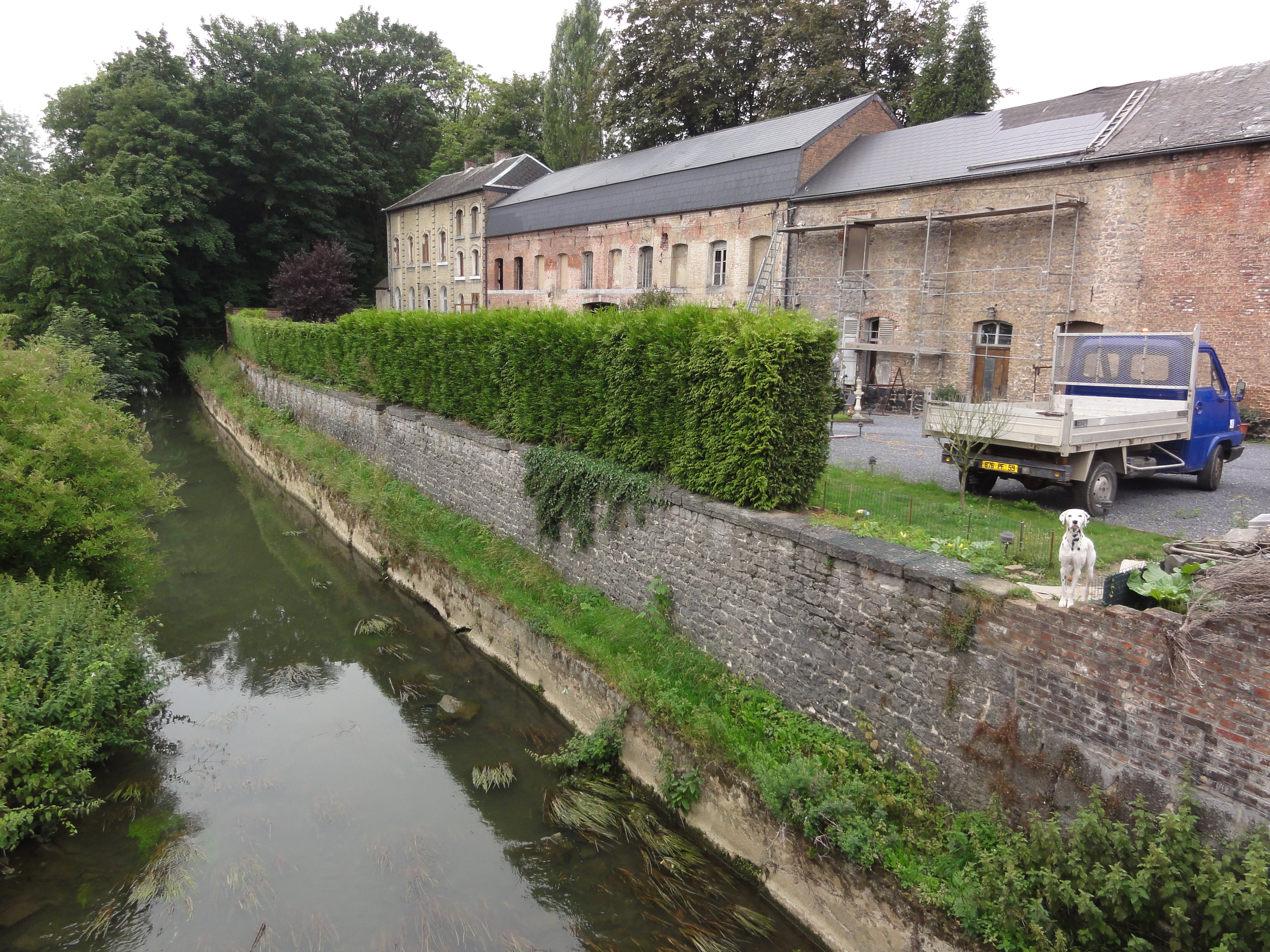
- The river in Ferrière-la-Grande

- Location within France Location within Hauts-de-France

Location
- Country: France

Physical characteristics
- Source
  - location: in the municipality of Solre-le-Château
  - elevation: 180 m (590 ft)
- Mouth
  - location: in the municipality of Rousies in the canalized Sambre
  - coordinates: 50°17′2″N 4°0′52″E
- Length: 22.4 km (13.9 mi)
- Basin size: 2,740 square kilometres (1,060 mi^{2})

Basin features
- Progression: Sambre→ Meuse→ North Sea

Solre is a river in France that runs in the Département Nord in the region Hauts-de-France. It originates from the confluence of two source streams at Solre-le-Château, in the Avesnois Regional Nature Park. The river generally drains to the northwest and empties at 22.4 kilometers east of Maubeuge, in the municipality of Rousies, as a right tributary to the channeled Sambre.

== Places on the river ==
- Solre-le-Château
- Obrechies
- Ferrière-la-Petite
- Ferrière-la-Grande
- Rousies
