= List of protected heritage sites in Froidchapelle =

This table shows an overview of the protected heritage sites in the Walloon town Froidchapelle. This list is part of Belgium's national heritage.

Object	Year/architect	Town/section	Address	Coordinates	Number^{?}	Image
Castle Farm of Vergnies: four-sided entrance and veranda surrounds the building (walls and roofs) ^{(nl)} ^{(fr)}		Froidchapelle	route de Renlies n°1	50.199029°N 4.301561°E	56029-CLT-0001-01 Info	Kasteelboerderij van Vergnies: vierzijdige ingang en gebouw dat de veranda omsluit (gevels en daken)
St. Martin's Church ^{(nl)} ^{(fr)}		Froidchapelle		50.198784°N 4.305433°E	56029-CLT-0002-01 Info	
Castle Farm of Septanes: main (facades and roofs) ^{(nl)} ^{(fr)}		Froidchapelle	Septanne, n°1	50.217282°N 4.339563°E	56029-CLT-0003-01 Info	

== See also ==
- List of protected heritage sites in Hainaut (province)
- Froidchapelle
