= Froidchapelle =

Municipality in Hainaut Province, Wallonia, Belgium

Froidchapelle Fritchapelle (Walloon)
- Municipality
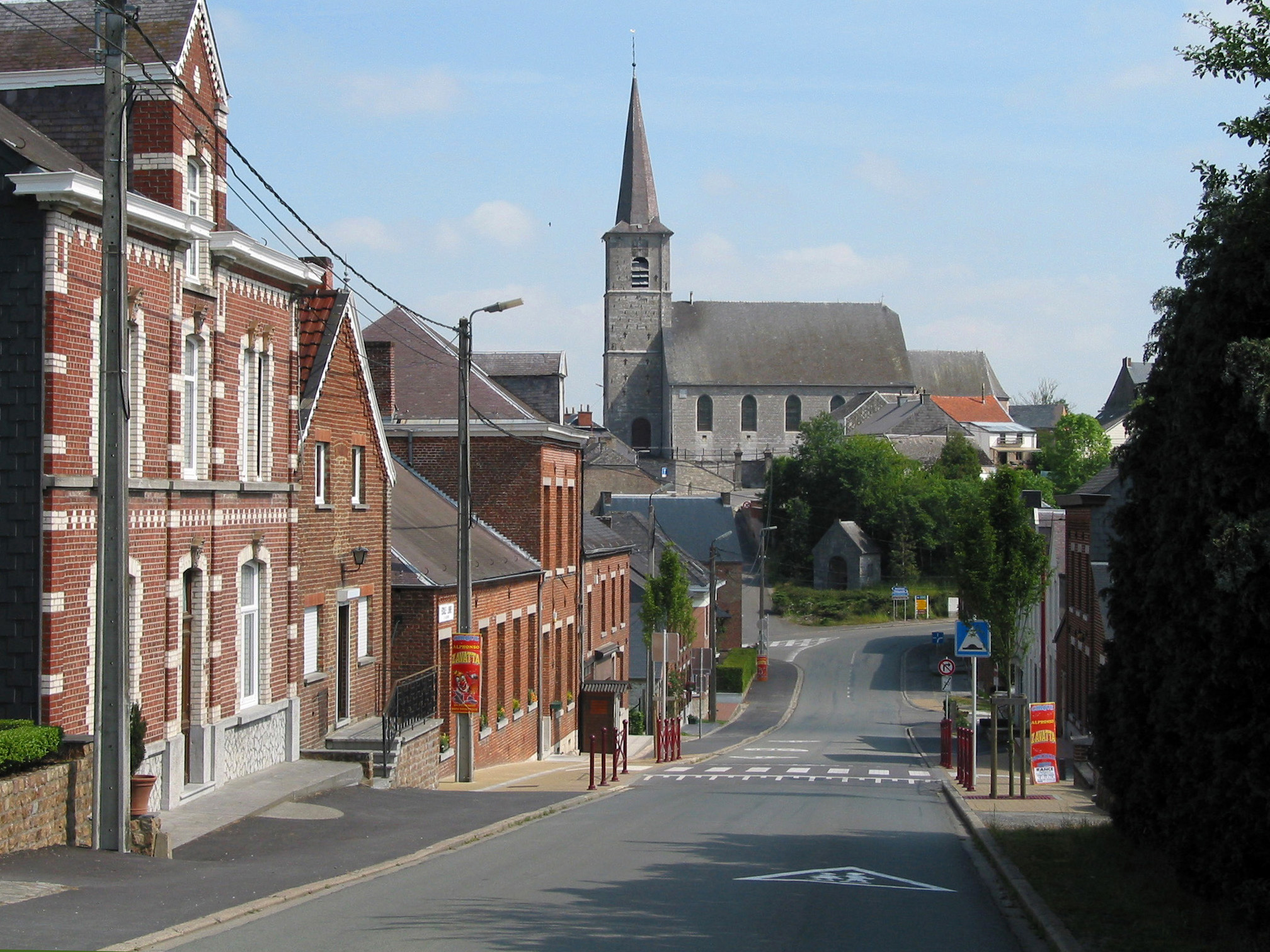

- Flag Coat of arms

- Location of Froidchapelle in Hainaut
- Interactive map of Froidchapelle
- Location in Belgium
- Coordinates: 50°09′N 04°19′E
- Country: Belgium
- Community: French Community
- Region: Wallonia
- Province: Hainaut
- Arrondissement: Thuin

Government
  - Mayor: Alain Vandromme
  - Governing parties: MR, EC

Area
  - Total: 86.54 km^{2} (33.41 sq mi)

Population (2018-01-01)
  - Total: 3,953
  - Density: 45.68/km^{2} (118.3/sq mi)
- Postal codes: 6440, 6441
- NIS code: 56029
- Area codes: 060
- Website: www.froidchapelle.be

Froidchapelle (French pronunciation: [fʁwa.ʃa.pɛl]; Picard: Frèchecapelle; Walloon: Fritchapelle) is a municipality of Wallonia located in the province of Hainaut, Belgium.

On 1 January 2006 Froidchapelle had a total population of 3,626. The total area is 86.03 km^{2} which gives a population density of 42 inhabitants per km^{2}.

The municipality consists of the following districts: Boussu-lez-Walcourt, Erpion, Fourbechies, Froidchapelle, and Vergnies.

The Eau d'Heure lakes are situated partly in this municipality and partly in neighbouring Cerfontaine.

== See also ==
- List of protected heritage sites in Froidchapelle
