= Solrinnes =

- Commune
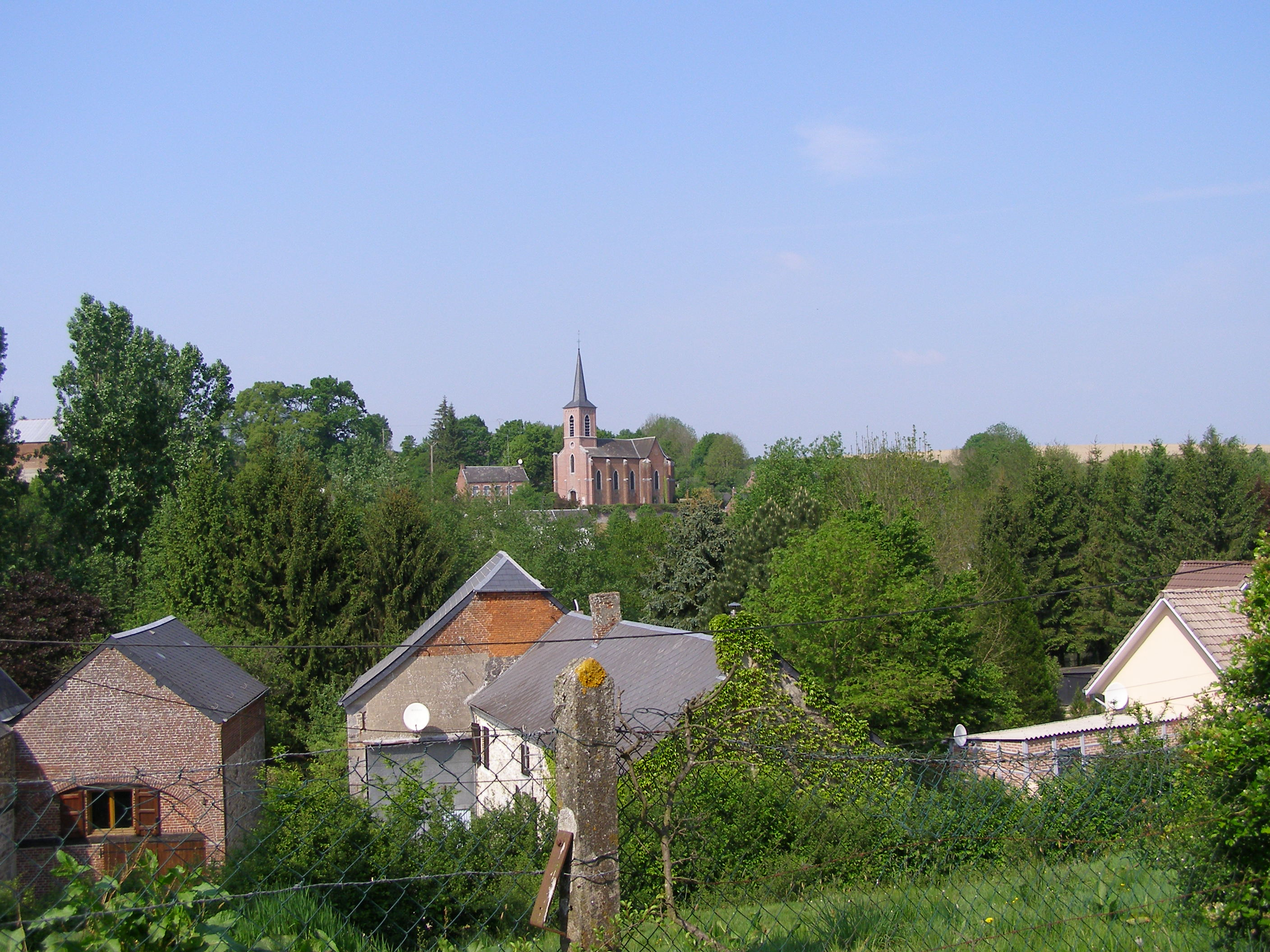
- A general view of Solrinnes

- Coat of arms
- Location of Solrinnes
- Location within France Location within Hauts-de-France
- Coordinates: 50°12′25″N 4°04′29″E
- Country: France
- Region: Hauts-de-France
- Department: Nord
- Arrondissement: Avesnes-sur-Helpe
- Canton: Fourmies
- Intercommunality: CC Cœur de l'Avesnois

Government
  - Mayor (2022–2026): Rémi Le Rouzic
- Area^{1}: 5.42 km^{2} (2.09 sq mi)
- Elevation: 200 m (660 ft)
- Highest elevation: 218 m (715 ft)
- Lowest elevation: 152 m (499 ft)
- Population (2023): 142
  - Density: 26.2/km^{2} (67.9/sq mi)
- Time zone: UTC+01:00 (CET)
  - Summer (DST): UTC+02:00 (CEST)
- INSEE/Postal code: 59573 /59740
- ^{1} French Land Register data, which excludes lakes, ponds, glaciers > 1 km^{2} (0.386 sq mi or 247 acres) and river estuaries.

Solrinnes is a commune in the Nord department in northern France.

== Heraldry ==
Arms of Solrinnes	The arms of Solrinnes are blazoned : Quarterly 1&4: Argent, 3 fesses gules; 2&3: Argent, 3 wagoner's axes top 2 addorsed gules. (Bermerain, Étrœungt, Féron, Ferrière-la-Grande, Lez-Fontaine, Rousies, Solre-le-Château and Solrinnes use the same arms.)

== See also ==
- Communes of the Nord department
