= Boussu-lez-Walcourt =

Coordinates: 50.225739°N 4.376442°E

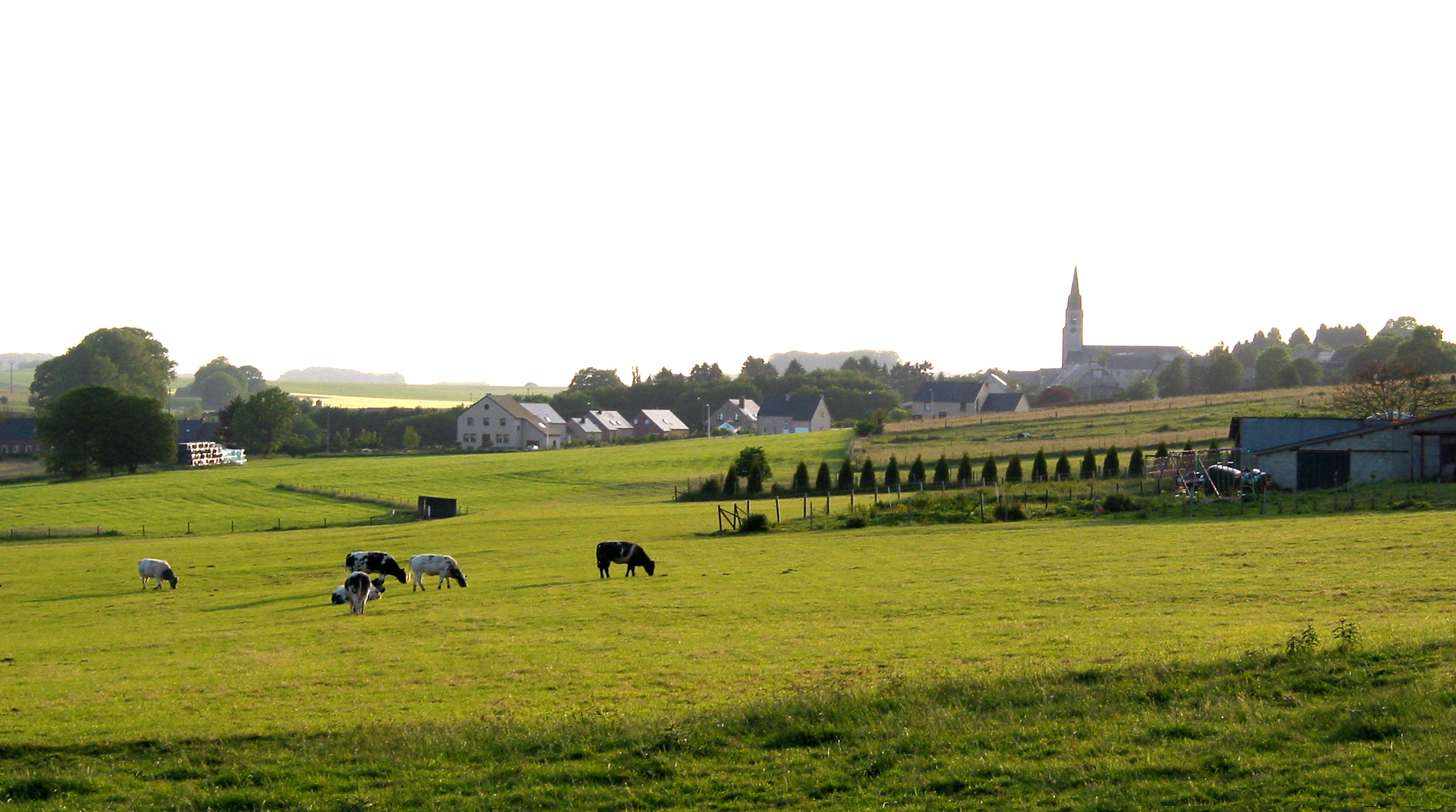
Boussu-lez-Walcourt seen from the chausée du Beaumont.

Boussu-lez-Walcourt (Walloon: Boussu-dlé-Walcoû) is a village of Wallonia and a district of the municipality of Froidchapelle, located in the province of Hainaut, Belgium.
