= Bermerain =

- Commune
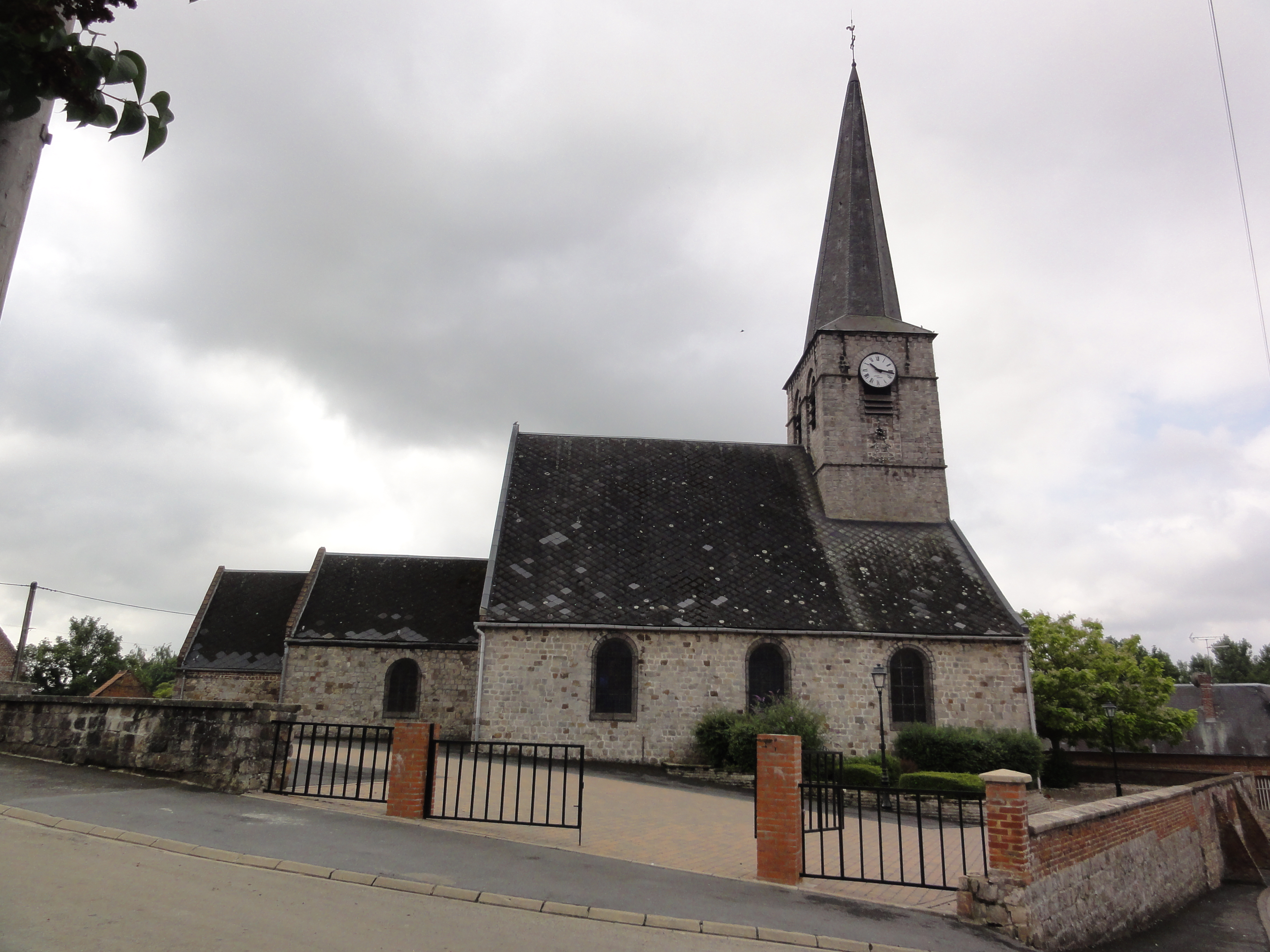
- The church in Bermerain

- Coat of arms
- Location of Bermerain
- Location within France Location within Hauts-de-France
- Coordinates: 50°15′10″N 3°32′02″E
- Country: France
- Region: Hauts-de-France
- Department: Nord
- Arrondissement: Cambrai
- Canton: Caudry
- Intercommunality: CC Pays Solesmois

Government
  - Mayor (2020–2026): Yvan Bruniau
- Area^{1}: 6.66 km^{2} (2.57 sq mi)
- Elevation: 104 m (341 ft)
- Highest elevation: 107 m (351 ft)
- Lowest elevation: 47 m (154 ft)
- Population (2023): 778
  - Density: 117/km^{2} (303/sq mi)
- Time zone: UTC+01:00 (CET)
  - Summer (DST): UTC+02:00 (CEST)
- INSEE/Postal code: 59069 /59213
- ^{1} French Land Register data, which excludes lakes, ponds, glaciers > 1 km^{2} (0.386 sq mi or 247 acres) and river estuaries.

Bermerain (French pronunciation: [bɛʁməʁɛ̃]) is a commune in the Nord department in northern France.

== History ==
Bermerain was the scene of action to drive back the Germans at the end of World War I. A dramatic account of fighting that took place between Bermerain and Sepmeries is provided by A S Bullock in his wartime memoir, which also illustrates one of only six maps thought to have been in circulation on the day in question (27 October 1918).

== Population ==
Historical population
Year	Pop.	±% p.a.
1968	697	—
1975	664	−0.69%
1982	707	+0.90%
1990	693	−0.25%
1999	710	+0.27%
2007	653	−1.04%
2012	667	+0.43%
2017	723	+1.63%
2023	778	+1.23%
Source: INSEE

== Heraldry ==
Arms of Bermerain	The arms of Bermerain are blazoned : Quarterly 1&4: Argent, 3 fesses gules; 2&3: Argent, 3 wagoner's axes top 2 addorsed gules. (Bermerain, Étrœungt, Féron, Ferrière-la-Grande, Lez-Fontaine, Rousies, Solre-le-Château and Solrinnes use the same arms.)

== See also ==
- Communes of the Nord department
