= Trélon =

- Commune
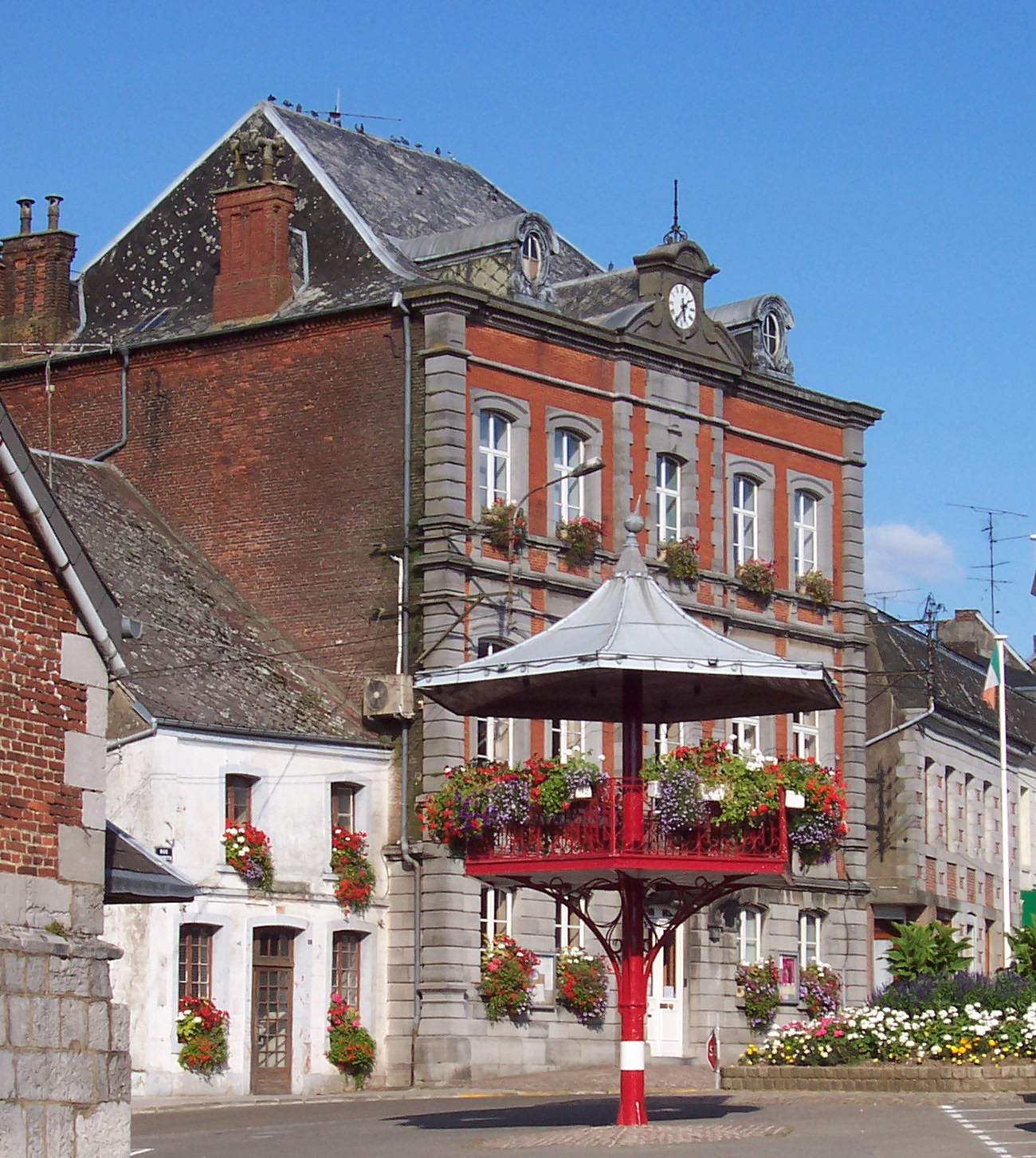
- The town hall in Trélon

- Coat of arms
- Location of Trélon
- Location within France Location within Hauts-de-France
- Coordinates: 50°03′32″N 4°06′12″E
- Country: France
- Region: Hauts-de-France
- Department: Nord
- Arrondissement: Avesnes-sur-Helpe
- Canton: Fourmies
- Intercommunality: CC Sud Avesnois

Government
  - Mayor (2020–2026): Thierry Reghem
- Area^{1}: 39.15 km^{2} (15.12 sq mi)
- Elevation: 250 m (820 ft)
- Highest elevation: 251 m (823 ft)
- Lowest elevation: 170 m (560 ft)
- Population (2023): 2,604
  - Density: 66.51/km^{2} (172.3/sq mi)
- Time zone: UTC+01:00 (CET)
  - Summer (DST): UTC+02:00 (CEST)
- INSEE/Postal code: 59601 /59132
- ^{1} French Land Register data, which excludes lakes, ponds, glaciers > 1 km^{2} (0.386 sq mi or 247 acres) and river estuaries.

Trélon (French pronunciation: [tʁelɔ̃]) is a commune in the Nord department in northern France.

Trélon forms the western edge of the Calestienne region.

== Population ==
Historical population
Year	Pop.	±% p.a.
1968	3,214	—
1975	3,438	+0.97%
1982	3,166	−1.17%
1990	2,923	−0.99%
1999	2,828	−0.37%
2007	2,984	+0.67%
2012	2,974	−0.07%
2017	2,856	−0.81%
2023	2,604	−1.53%
Source: INSEE

== Heraldry ==
Arms of Trélon	The arms of Trélon are blazoned : Gules, 2 fesses embattled counter-embattled argent, overall a sinister canton ermine with a chief argent.

== See also ==
- Communes of the Nord department
