= Pierre François Dumont =

French industrialist

Deputy for Nord
- In office 21 June 1834 – 12 June 1842

Personal details
- Born: 12 January 1789 Bouchain, Nord, France
- Died: 25 July 1864 (aged 75) Ferrières, Nord, France

Pierre François Dumont (12 January 1789 – 27 July 1864) was a French industrialist involved in mining and iron making in the Nord department. He was elected to the Chamber of Deputies during the July Monarchy.

== Early years ==
Pierre François Dumont was born on 12 January 1789 in Bouchain, Nord. His parents were Jean Baptiste Dumont and Marie Félicité Joseph Rémy. His father was a wealthy baker in Bouchain. During the Napoleonic Wars he enlisted as a simple soldier in 1808, and served in Spain until 1814. He received the cross of the Legion of Honour on the battlefield of Arapiles. He rose to the rank of captain of the light infantry. He fought at the battles of Toulouse and Waterloo.

== Industrialist ==
Dumont was placed on half pay at the Bourbon Restoration, and retired to Bouchain. There he became an associate in exploiting the Raismes foundry. Dumont became a knight of the Legion of Honour on 10 October 1816. Around 1824 Dumont et Cie was founded "to exploit the first establishments of forges and rolling mills of Valenciennes". In 1828 Dumont applied for a concession to operate iron mines in the canton of Maubeuge, and for authorization to establish two iron furnaces at Ferrière-la-Grande powered by steam. Dumont founded the factories at Ferrière-la-Grande in 1830, the first coke-fired blast furnaces in the north of France to produce and mould pig-iron from the local minerals.

In 1834, Dumont bought half of the land for the Denain iron factory, the other half belonging to Serret and Lelièvre. The Société Serret, Lelièvre et Cie was constituted in 1834 to build and run the Forges de Denain. The partners were Georges Serret, Isidore Charpentier-Odolant and Charles Lelièvre. Dumont also participated. Serret and Dumont were also partners in the Forges de Raismes (Renaux, Dumont et Cie). The factory in Denain was located beside the Escaut river, which had been canalized between Valenciennes and Cambrai since 1775. The Mines d'Anzin operated three coal mines 100 metres (330 ft) below the Denain factory. The first coke-fired blast furnaces of the Forges de Denain began operations in 1836.

Dumont married Aglaé-Renelde-Marianne-Antoinette de Martigny des Roches on 18 October 1841. In 1849 Léon Talabot took control of the Denain and Anzin forges and merged them. Talabot combined the Forges et Laminoirs d'Anzin with the Serret, Lelièvre, Dumont et Cie company of Denain to form the Société des hauts-fourneaux et des forges de Denain et Anzin, the largest metallurgical company in the Nord Department. By decree of 23 April 1859 Dumont was granted a concession to build a railway line to link the factories Ferrière-la-Grande to the Saint-Quentin line at Erquelinnes. The line was built on land acquired by Dumont or expropriated on the grounds of public utility.

== Politician ==
Dumont became a municipal councilor and a general councilor in the department of Nord. On 21 June 1834 he was elected deputy for the constituency of Valenciennes, Nord. At first he sat with the center left, but then joined the dynastic opposition led by Odilon Barrot. He was reelected on 4 November 1837 and on 2 March 1839. He left office on 12 June 1842 and retired from national politics. Dumont was mayor of Ferrière-la-Grande from 1860 to 1864. He was awarded the Saint Helena Medal.

Pierre François Dumont died on 27 July 1864 in Ferrière-la-Grande, Nord. He was survived by his widow and by his son and sole heir Alphonse-Edgard Dumont. There is a Rue Pierre-François Dumont in Ferrière-la-Grande.

== See also ==
- Maubeuge-Fourmies rail line

== Sources ==
- "19 Rue Pierre-François Dumont, 59680 Ferrière-la-grande", Jestime (in French)
- Barbier, Frédéric; Daviet, Jean-Pierre (1989), Le patronat du Nord sous le Second Empire: une approche prosopographique, Librairie Droz, ISBN 978-2-600-03408-1
- "Etablissements metallurgiques de Ferrière-la-grande", Bulletin de le Societe de l'Industrie Minerale (in French), vol. IV, Société de l'industrie minérale, 1890
- Carnot, Sadi (1881), Annales des ponts et chaussees. 2. partie: Partie administrative (in French)
- Cazot, Jules (1881), Bulletin des lois de la République franc̜aise (in French), Imprimerie nationale
- Delvaux, Claudette, Les Grands Hommes (in French), Ferrière-la-Grande
- Hardy-Hemery, Odette (October–December 1983), "Une nébuleuse en expansion aux XIXe et XXe siècles: l'espace de l'usine sidérurgique de Denain", Le Mouvement social (in French), 125 (125), Editions l'Atelier on behalf of Association Le Mouvement Social: 57–78, doi:10.2307/3777682, JSTOR 3777682
- Hardy-Hémery, Odette (2002), Trith-Saint-Léger: du premier âge industriel à nos jours (in French), Presses Univ. Septentrion, ISBN 978-2-85939-768-5
- Pierre, François Dumont (in French), Assemblée nationale
- Reconstitution des Matricules (in French), Legion of Honour, 4 February 1872 – via Leonore: Ministry of Culture
- Robert, Adolphefirst2=Gaston; Cougny (1889), "Dumont (Pierre François)", Dictionnaire des parlementaires français de 1789 à 1889 (in French)
- Smith, Michael Stephen (2006), The Emergence of Modern Business Enterprise in France, 1800–1930, Harvard University Press, ISBN 978-0-674-01939-3
