= Glageon =

- Commune
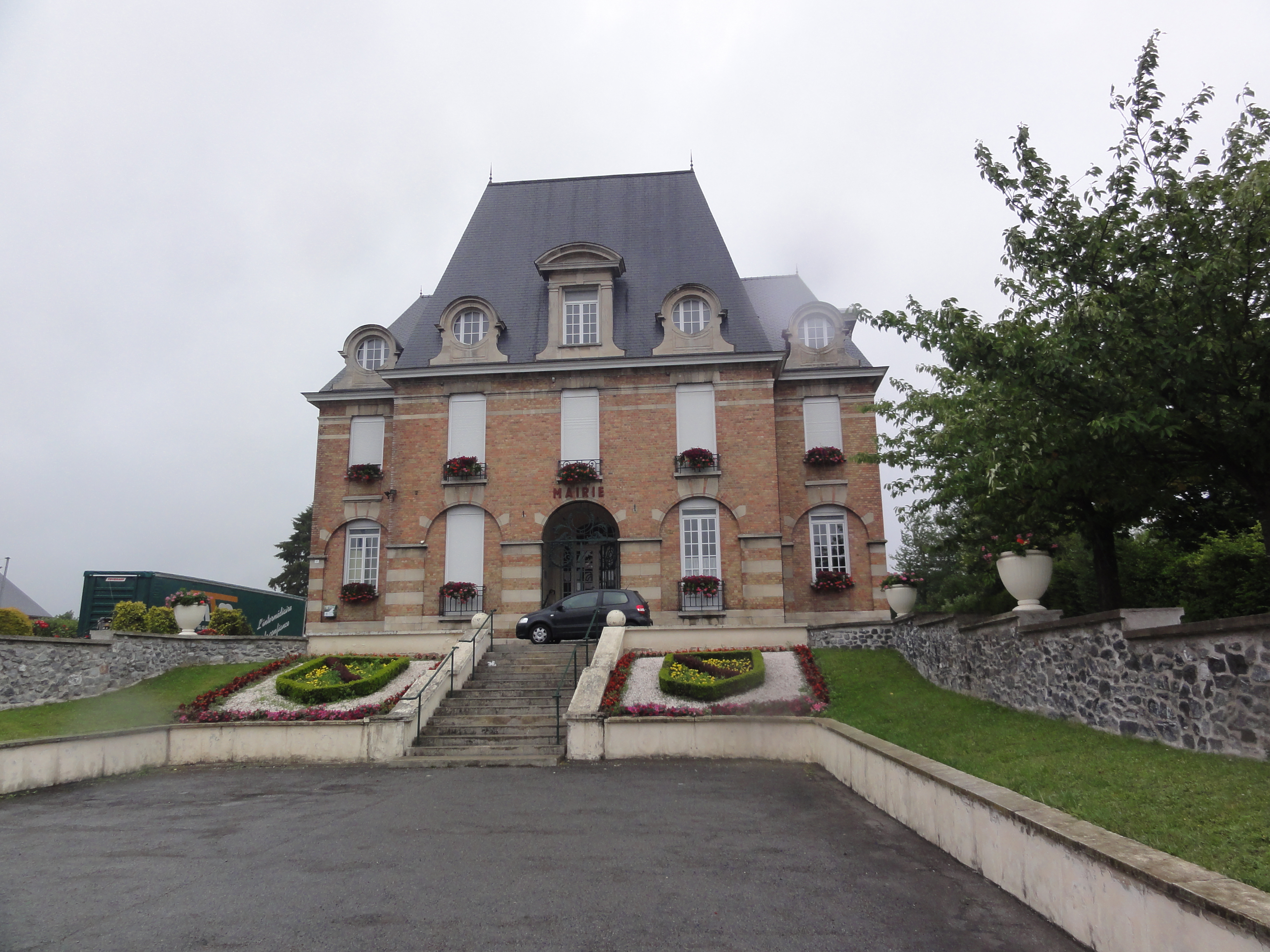
- The town hall in Glageon

- Coat of arms
- Location of Glageon
- Location within France Location within Hauts-de-France
- Coordinates: 50°03′25″N 4°04′32″E
- Country: France
- Region: Hauts-de-France
- Department: Nord
- Arrondissement: Avesnes-sur-Helpe
- Canton: Fourmies
- Intercommunality: CC Sud Avesnois

Government
  - Mayor (2020–2026): Frédéric Bettignies
- Area^{1}: 11.77 km^{2} (4.54 sq mi)
- Elevation: 189 m (620 ft)
- Highest elevation: 244 m (801 ft)
- Lowest elevation: 168 m (551 ft)
- Population (2023): 1,699
  - Density: 144.4/km^{2} (373.9/sq mi)
- Time zone: UTC+01:00 (CET)
  - Summer (DST): UTC+02:00 (CEST)
- INSEE/Postal code: 59261 /59132
- ^{1} French Land Register data, which excludes lakes, ponds, glaciers > 1 km^{2} (0.386 sq mi or 247 acres) and river estuaries.

Glageon (French pronunciation: [ɡlaʒɔ̃]) is a commune in the Nord department in northern France.

== Heraldry ==
Arms of Glageon	The arms of Glageon are blazoned : Ermine, a bend gules.

== See also ==
- Communes of the Nord department
