= Cerfontaine, Belgium =

Municipality of Namur in Wallonia, Belgium

Cerfontaine Cerfontinne (Walloon)
- Municipality
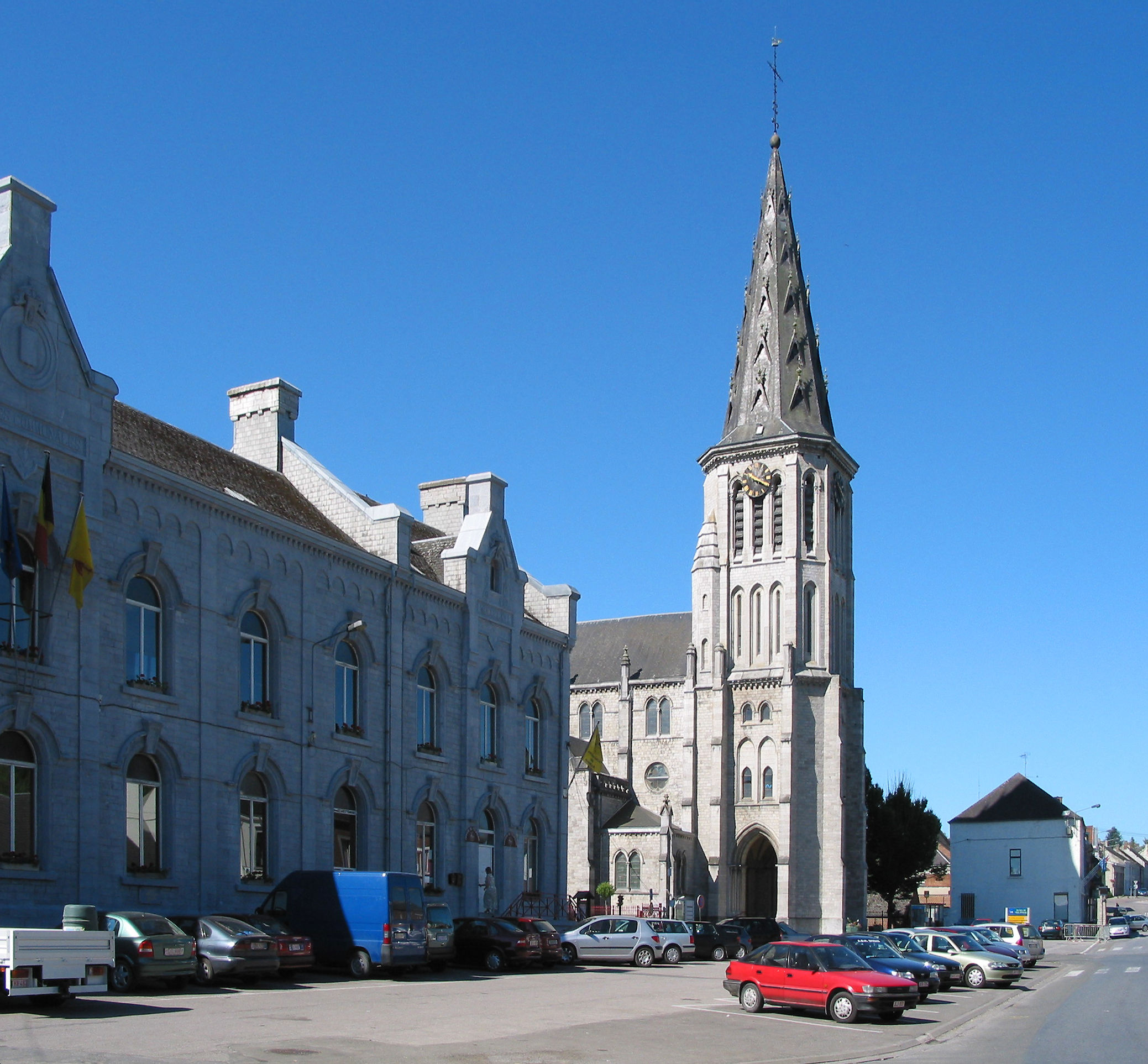

- Coat of arms

- Location of Cerfontaine in the province of Namur
- Interactive map of Cerfontaine
- Location in Belgium
- Coordinates: 50°10′N 04°25′E
- Country: Belgium
- Community: French Community
- Region: Wallonia
- Province: Namur
- Arrondissement: Philippeville

Government
  - Mayor: Christophe Bombled
  - Governing party: MR-IC MR

Area
  - Total: 83.44 km^{2} (32.22 sq mi)

Population (2018-01-01)
  - Total: 4,927
  - Density: 59.05/km^{2} (152.9/sq mi)
- Postal codes: 5630
- NIS code: 93010
- Area codes: 071
- Website: www.cerfontaine.be

Cerfontaine (French pronunciation: [sɛʁfɔ̃tɛn]; Walloon: Cerfontinne) is a municipality of Wallonia located in the province of Namur, Belgium.

On January 1, 2006, Cerfontaine had a total population of 4,546. The total area is 83.45 km^{2} which gives a population density of 54 inhabitants per km^{2}.

The municipality consists of the following districts: Cerfontaine, Daussois, Senzeille, Silenrieux, Soumoy, and Villers-Deux-Églises.

The Eau d'Heure lakes are situated partly in this municipality and partly in neighbouring Froidchapelle.

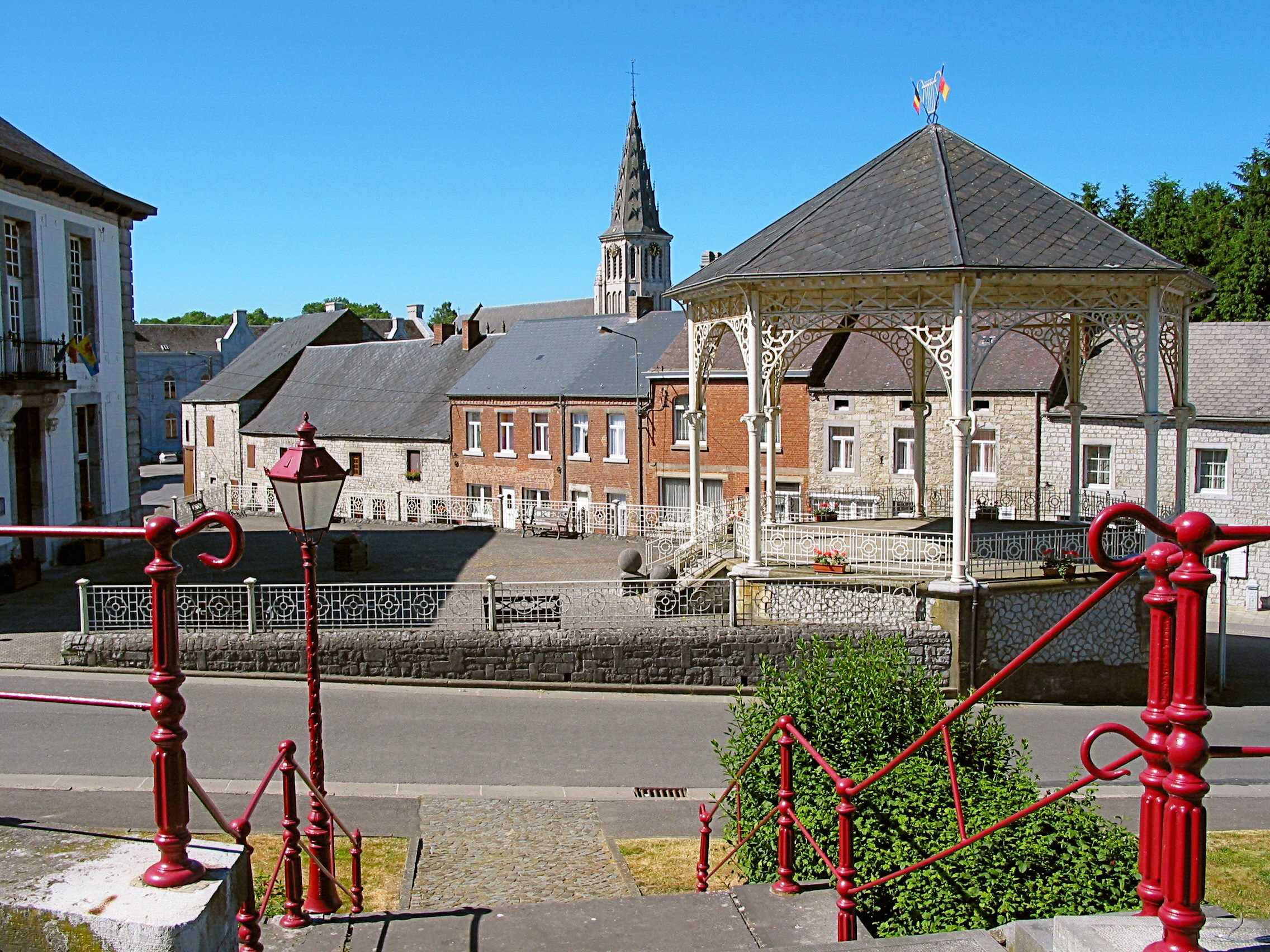
Rue du Moulin, the pavilion and the St. Lambertus church

== History ==
=== Postal history ===
The CERFONTAINE post-office opened on 25 February 1860. It used a Distribution code 98 with vertical bars (before 1864), and 75 with points before 1874. The SILENRIEUX post-office opened on 9 December 1899; SENZEILLES on 21 August 1906.

Code 5630 since at least 1990.

Postal codes in 1969 (before the merger of municipalities in 1977): - 6355 Villers-Deux-Églises - 6444 Silenrieux - 6445 Daussois - 6450 Cerfontaine - 6451 Soumoy - 6452 Senzeille.

== Town twinning ==
- Louiseville, Quebec, Canada

== See also ==
- List of protected heritage sites in Cerfontaine, Belgium
