= Lez-Fontaine =

- Commune
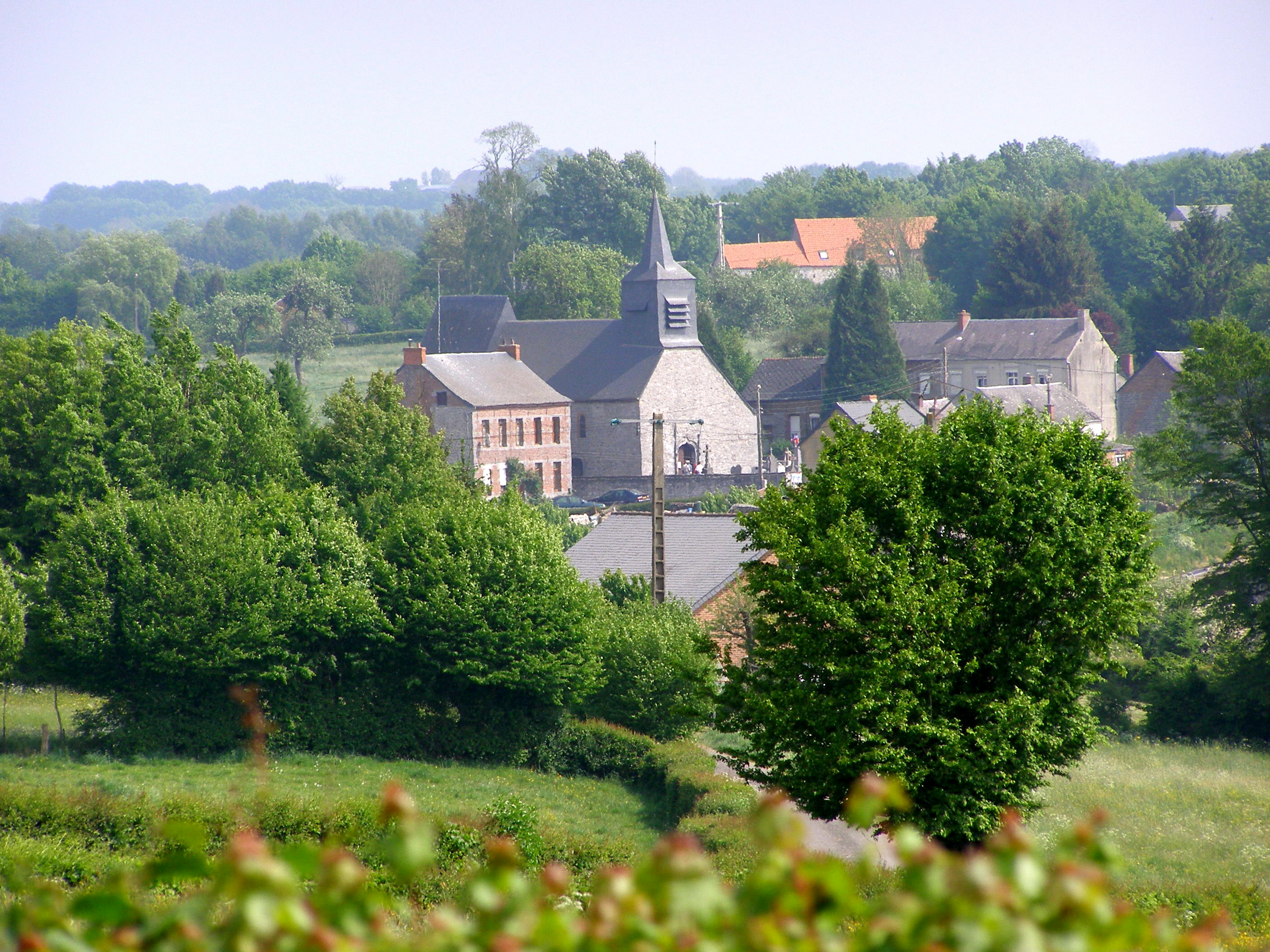
- A general view of Lez-Fontaine

- Coat of arms
- Location of Lez-Fontaine
- Location within France Location within Hauts-de-France
- Coordinates: 50°10′41″N 4°03′45″E
- Country: France
- Region: Hauts-de-France
- Department: Nord
- Arrondissement: Avesnes-sur-Helpe
- Canton: Fourmies
- Intercommunality: CC Cœur de l'Avesnois

Government
  - Mayor (2020–2026): Philippe Hanot
- Area^{1}: 4.51 km^{2} (1.74 sq mi)
- Elevation: 179 m (587 ft)
- Highest elevation: 225 m (738 ft)
- Lowest elevation: 167 m (548 ft)
- Population (2023): 236
  - Density: 52.3/km^{2} (136/sq mi)
- Time zone: UTC+01:00 (CET)
  - Summer (DST): UTC+02:00 (CEST)
- INSEE/Postal code: 59342 /59740
- ^{1} French Land Register data, which excludes lakes, ponds, glaciers > 1 km^{2} (0.386 sq mi or 247 acres) and river estuaries.

Lez-Fontaine is a commune in the Nord department in northern France.

== Heraldry ==
Arms of Lez-Fontaine	The arms of Lez-Fontaine are blazoned : Quarterly 1&4: Argent, 3 fesses gules; 2&3: Argent, 3 wagoner's axes top 2 addorsed gules. (Bermerain, Étrœungt, Féron, Ferrière-la-Grande, Lez-Fontaine, Rousies, Solre-le-Château and Solrinnes use the same arms.)

== See also ==
- Communes of the Nord department
