= Fagne-Famenne =

Natural region in Belgium and France

Coordinates: 50.17°N 4.85°E

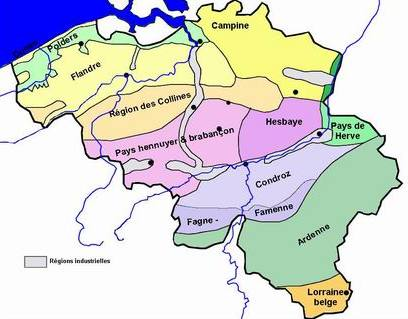
The natural regions of Belgium Fagne-Fammene

Fagne-Famenne is a natural region in southern Belgium and northern France. It consists of The Fagne or la Fagne west of the river Meuse, and Famenne to the east. The two regions are often grouped together because they are quite similar both geographically and naturally.
