= Calestienne =

Geological region of Belgium made up of a narrow band of limestone terrains

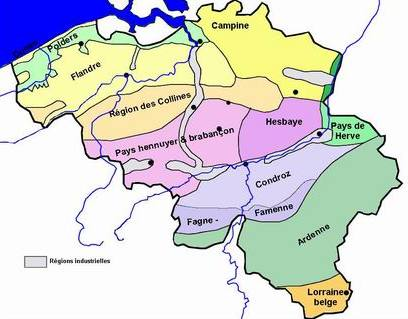
The natural regions of Belgium

The Calestienne (Walloon: Calistinne), a 130-kilometer-long, narrow strip primarily composed of limestone rock (mainly Givetian), stretches across both Belgium's Wallonia region and a small portion of France. Reaching a maximum altitude of nearly 300 meters, this region's distinctive relief is the result of significant erosion.

Situated between the lower Fagne-Famenne and the higher Ardennes, the Calestienne extends from the communes of Fourmies and Wallers-en-Fagne in France to Louveigné in Belgium's Liège Province.
