= Silenrieux =

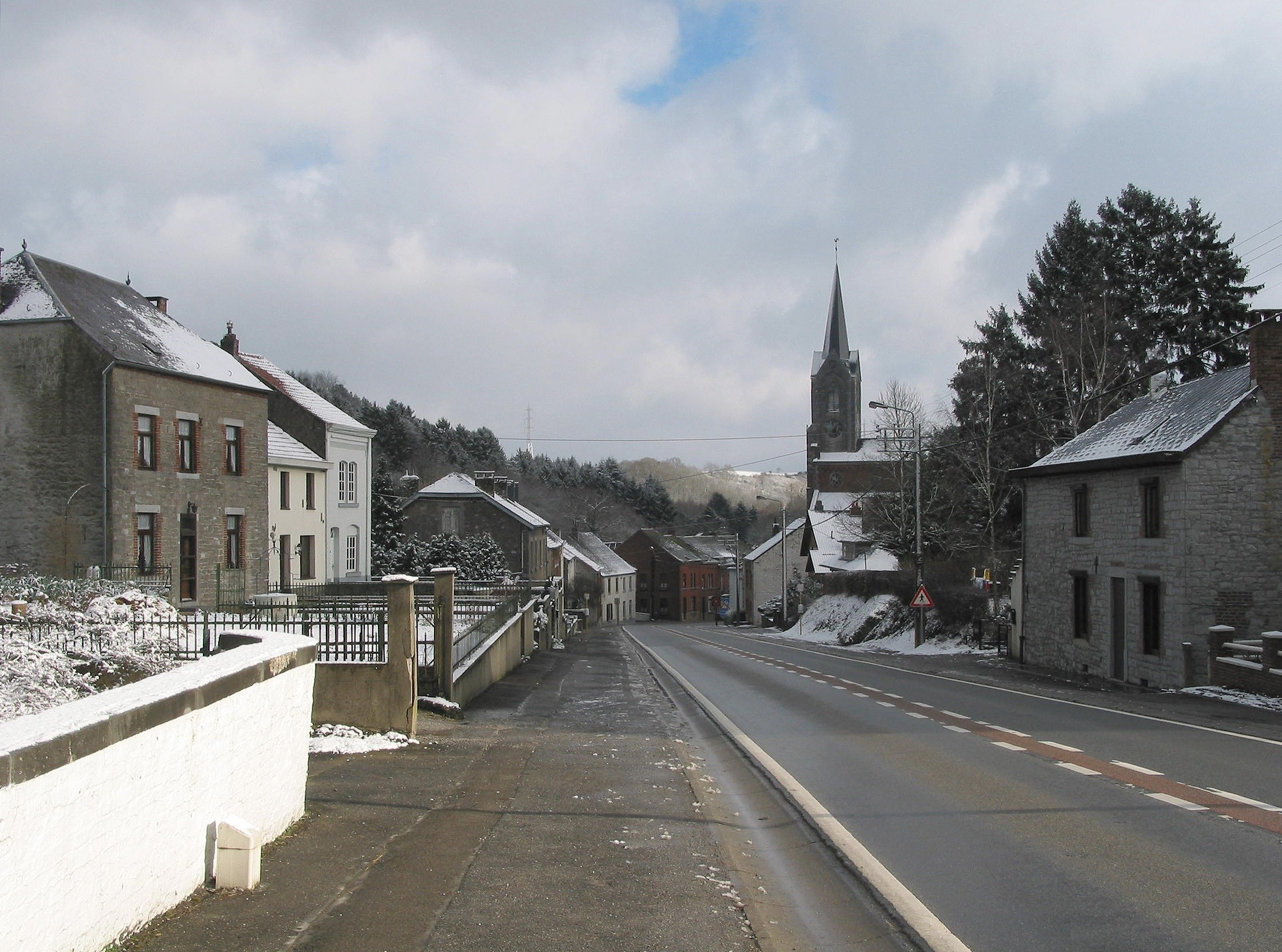
- Silenrieux

- Location within Belgium Location within Europe
- Coordinates: 50°13′28″N 04°24′34″E
- Country: Belgium
- Region: Wallonia
- Province: Namur
- Municipality: Cerfontaine

Silenrieux is a village of Wallonia in the municipality of Cerfontaine, located in the province of Namur, Belgium.

The earliest evidence of human settlement in the area date from the Iron Age. During the Middle Ages, the Jardinet Abbey in Walcourt held extensive rights in the area, including from 1543 a mill. From 1852 until 1970, the village was connected to the railway and had a railway station. Fighting took place in the village both during World War I and World War II.
