= Rousies =

- Commune
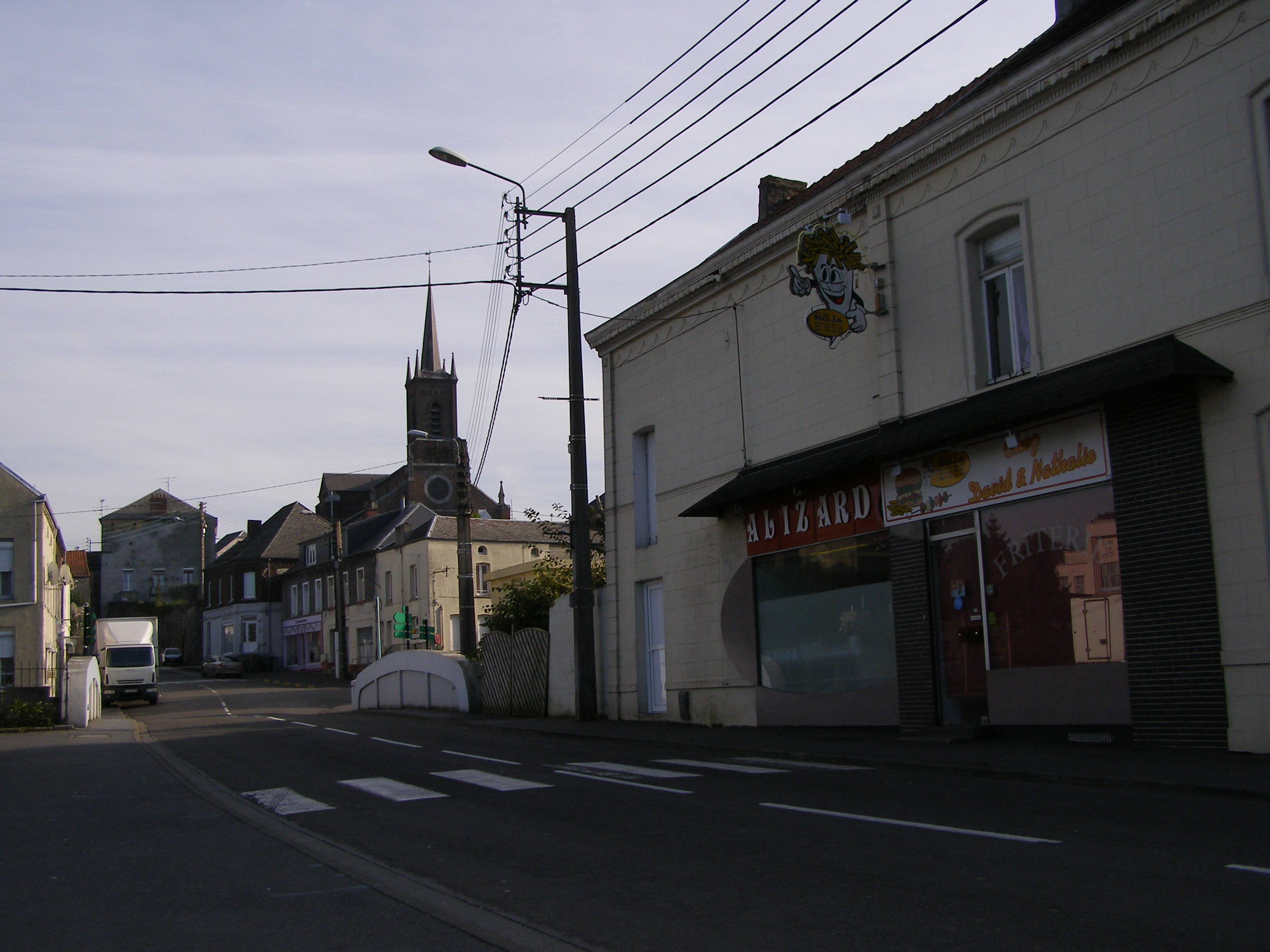
- A view within Rousies

- Coat of arms
- Location of Rousies
- Location within France Location within Hauts-de-France
- Coordinates: 50°16′20″N 4°00′24″E
- Country: France
- Region: Hauts-de-France
- Department: Nord
- Arrondissement: Avesnes-sur-Helpe
- Canton: Fourmies
- Intercommunality: CA Maubeuge Val de Sambre

Government
  - Mayor (2020–2026): Josiane Suleck
- Area^{1}: 5.79 km^{2} (2.24 sq mi)
- Highest elevation: 167 m (548 ft)
- Lowest elevation: 122 m (400 ft)
- Population (2023): 3,980
  - Density: 687/km^{2} (1,780/sq mi)
- Time zone: UTC+01:00 (CET)
  - Summer (DST): UTC+02:00 (CEST)
- INSEE/Postal code: 59514 /59131
- ^{1} French Land Register data, which excludes lakes, ponds, glaciers > 1 km^{2} (0.386 sq mi or 247 acres) and river estuaries.

Rousies (French pronunciation: [ʁuzi]) is a commune in the Nord department in northern France.

It is located south of Maubeuge, on the river Solre.

== Population ==
Historical population
Year	Pop.	±% p.a.
1968	5,002	—
1975	4,522	−1.43%
1982	4,377	−0.46%
1990	4,302	−0.22%
1999	4,257	−0.12%
2007	4,202	−0.16%
2012	4,273	+0.34%
2017	4,016	−1.23%
2023	3,980	−0.15%
Source: INSEE

== Heraldry ==
Arms of Rousies	The arms of Rousies are blazoned : Quarterly 1&4: Argent, 3 fesses gules; 2&3: Argent, 3 wagoner's axes top 2 addorsed gules. (Bermerain, Étrœungt, Féron, Ferrière-la-Grande, Lez-Fontaine, Rousies, Solre-le-Château and Solrinnes use the same arms.)

== See also ==
- Communes of the Nord department
