= Ferrière-la-Grande =

- Commune
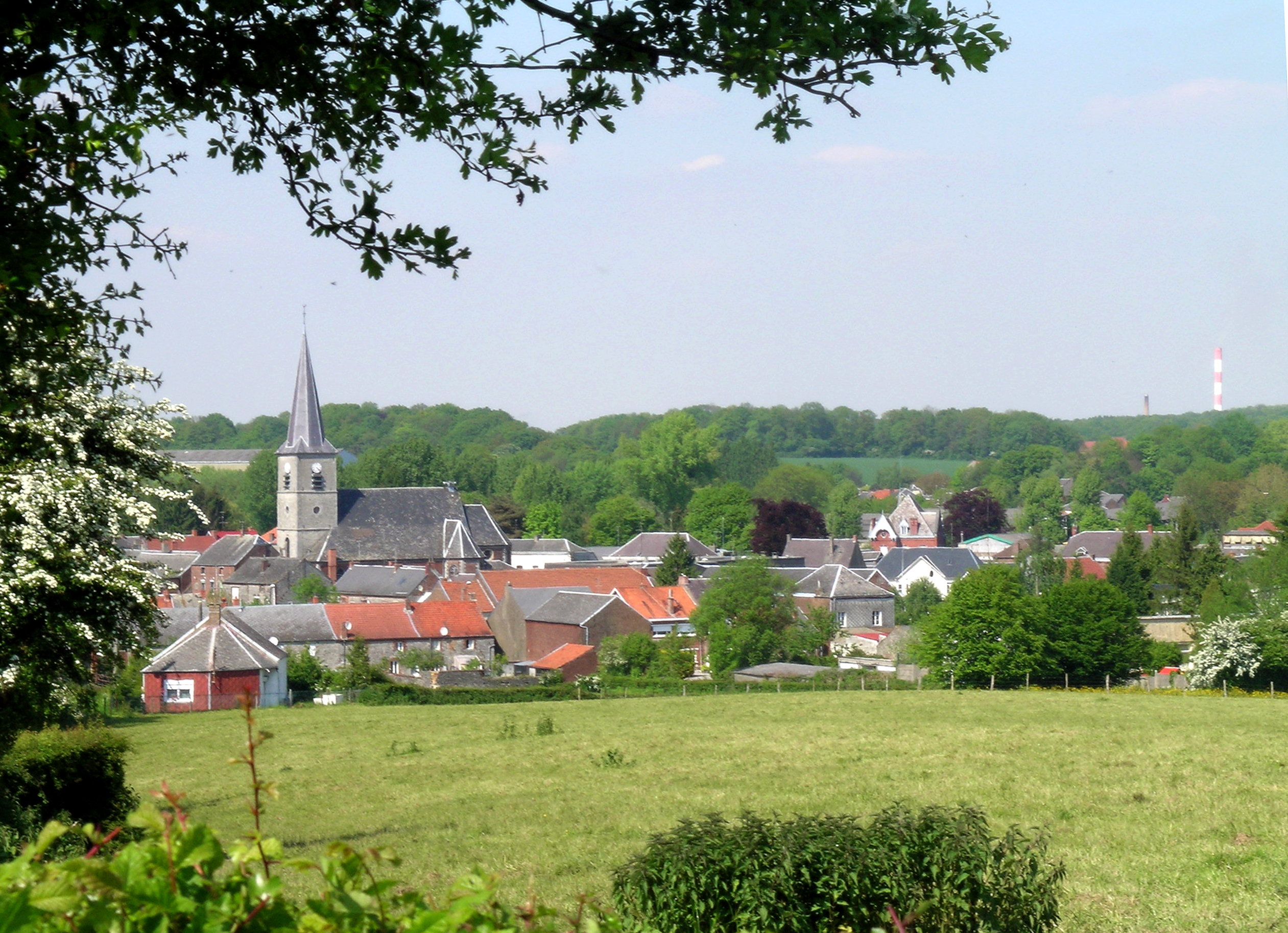
- Global view

- Coat of arms
- Location of Ferrière-la-Grande
- Location within France Location within Hauts-de-France
- Coordinates: 50°15′20″N 3°59′36″E
- Country: France
- Region: Hauts-de-France
- Department: Nord
- Arrondissement: Avesnes-sur-Helpe
- Canton: Maubeuge
- Intercommunality: CA Maubeuge Val de Sambre

Government
  - Mayor (2020–2026): Benoît Courtin
- Area^{1}: 10.01 km^{2} (3.86 sq mi)
- Elevation: 149 m (489 ft)
- Highest elevation: 184 m (604 ft)
- Lowest elevation: 127 m (417 ft)
- Population (2023): 5,131
  - Density: 512.6/km^{2} (1,328/sq mi)
- Time zone: UTC+01:00 (CET)
  - Summer (DST): UTC+02:00 (CEST)
- INSEE/Postal code: 59230 /59680
- ^{1} French Land Register data, which excludes lakes, ponds, glaciers > 1 km^{2} (0.386 sq mi or 247 acres) and river estuaries.

Ferrière-la-Grande (French pronunciation: [fɛʁjɛʁ la ɡʁɑ̃d]) is a commune in the Nord department in northern France. The river Solre flows through the commune.

In 1828 Pierre François Dumont applied for a concession to operate iron mines in the canton of Maubeuge, and for authorization to establish two iron furnaces at Ferrière-la-Grande powered by steam. Dumont founded the factories at Ferrière-la-grande in 1830, the first coke-fired blast furnaces in the north of France to produce and mould pig-iron from the local minerals. By decree of 23 April 1859 Dumont was granted a concession to build a railway line to link the factories Ferrière-la-Grande to the Saint-Quentin line at Erquelinnes. The line was built on land acquired by Dumont or expropriated on the grounds of public utility.

== Population ==
Historical population
Year	Pop.	±% p.a.
1968	5,346	—
1975	5,703	+0.93%
1982	5,611	−0.23%
1990	5,746	+0.30%
1999	5,672	−0.14%
2007	5,457	−0.48%
2012	5,365	−0.34%
2017	5,301	−0.24%
2023	5,131	−0.54%
Source: INSEE

== Heraldry ==
Arms of Ferrière-la-Grande	The arms of Ferrière-la-Grande are blazoned : Quarterly 1&4: Argent, 3 fesses gules; 2&3: Argent, 3 wagoner's axes top 2 addorsed gules. (Bermerain, Étrœungt, Féron, Ferrière-la-Grande, Lez-Fontaine, Rousies, Solre-le-Château and Solrinnes use the same arms.)

== See also ==
- Communes of the Nord department

== Sources ==
- Barbier, Frédéric; Daviet, Jean-Pierre (1989), Le patronat du Nord sous le Second Empire: une approche prosopographique, Librairie Droz, ISBN 978-2-600-03408-1
- "Etablissements metallurgiques de Ferrière-la-grande", Bulletin de le Societe de l'Industrie Minerale (in French), vol. IV, Société de l'industrie minérale, 1890
- Carnot, Sadi (1881), Annales des ponts et chaussees. 2. partie: Partie administrative (in French)
