= Solre-le-Château =

- Commune
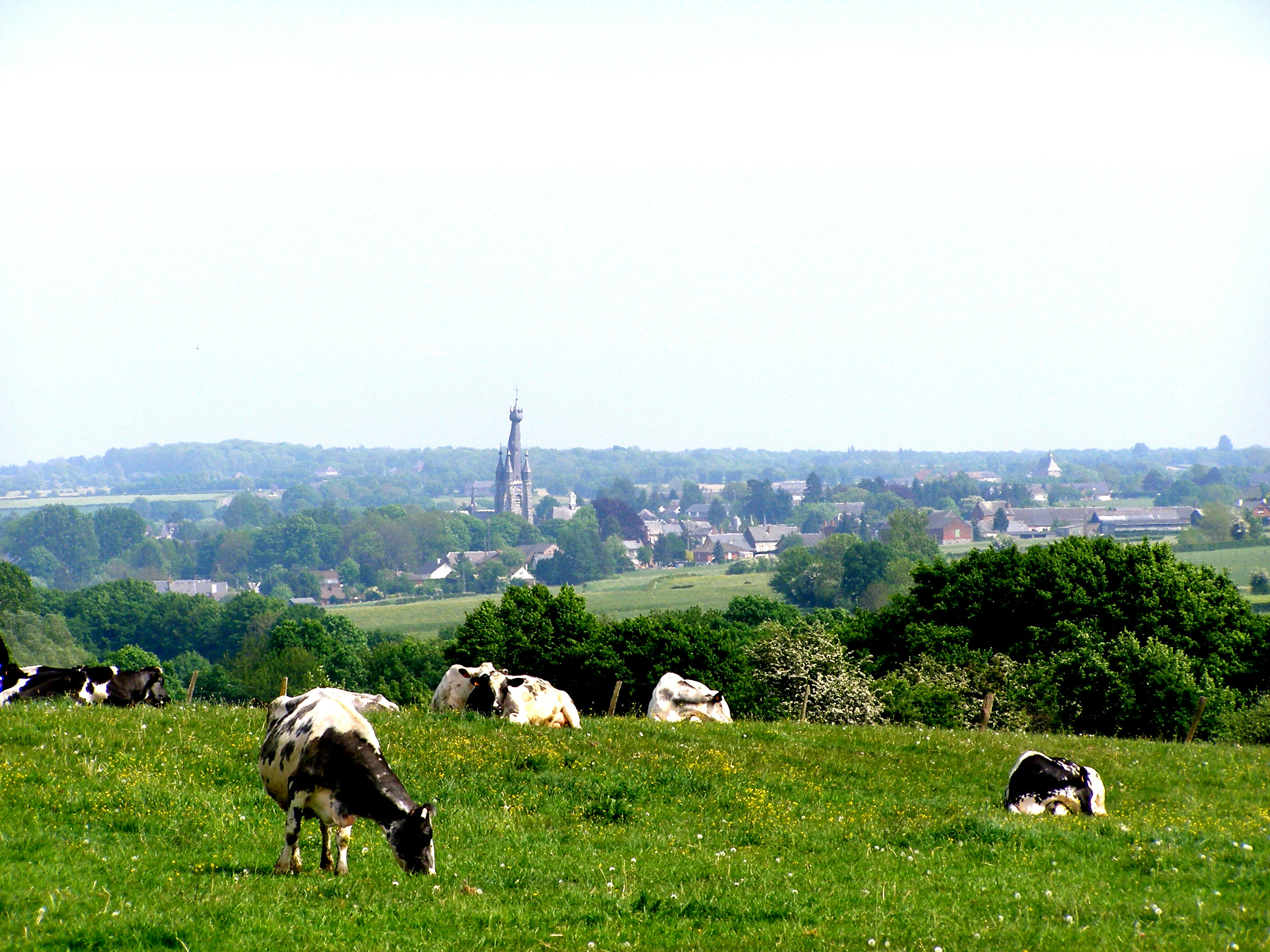
- A general view of Solre-le-Château

- Coat of arms
- Location of Solre-le-Château
- Location within France Location within Hauts-de-France
- Coordinates: 50°10′31″N 4°05′33″E
- Country: France
- Region: Hauts-de-France
- Department: Nord
- Arrondissement: Avesnes-sur-Helpe
- Canton: Fourmies
- Intercommunality: CC Cœur de l'Avesnois

Government
  - Mayor (2020–2026): Patrick Dehen
- Area^{1}: 13.76 km^{2} (5.31 sq mi)
- Elevation: 200 m (660 ft)
- Highest elevation: 236 m (774 ft)
- Lowest elevation: 168 m (551 ft)
- Population (2023): 1,796
  - Density: 130.5/km^{2} (338.1/sq mi)
- Time zone: UTC+01:00 (CET)
  - Summer (DST): UTC+02:00 (CEST)
- INSEE/Postal code: 59572 /59740
- ^{1} French Land Register data, which excludes lakes, ponds, glaciers > 1 km^{2} (0.386 sq mi or 247 acres) and river estuaries.

Solre-le-Château (French pronunciation: [sɔʁ lə ʃɑto]) is a commune in the Nord department in northern France. The river Solre flows through the commune.

== Heraldry ==
Arms of Solre-le-Château	The arms of Solre-le-Château are blazoned : Quarterly 1&4: Argent, 3 fesses gules; 2&3: Argent, 3 wagoner's axes top 2 addorsed gules. (Bermerain, Étrœungt, Féron, Ferrière-la-Grande, Lez-Fontaine, Rousies, Solre-le-Château and Solrinnes use the same arms.)

== See also ==
- Communes of the Nord department
