= La Flamengrie, Aisne =

La Flamengrie
- Commune
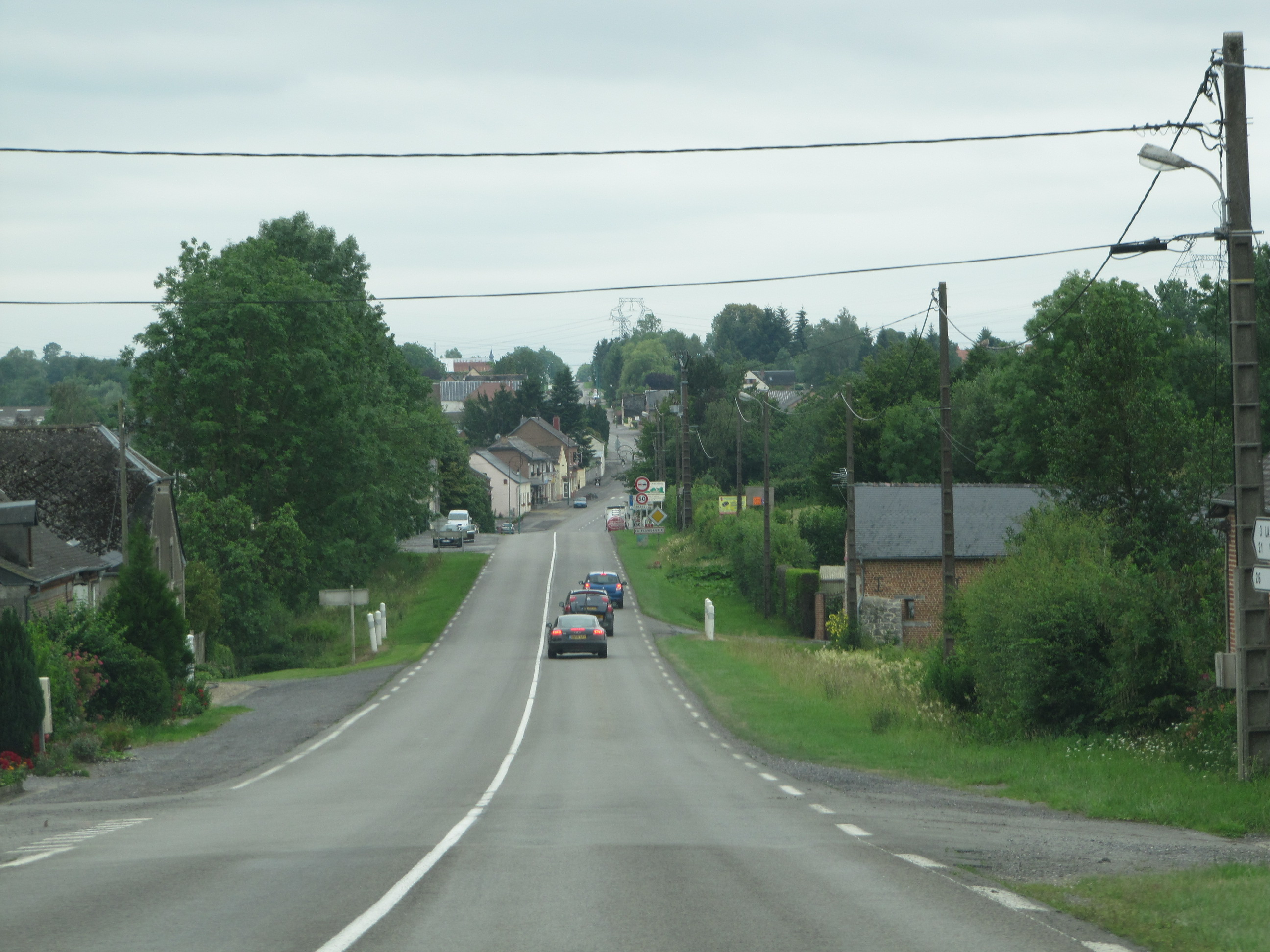
- A general view of La Flamengrie
- Location of La Flamengrie
- Location within France Location within Hauts-de-France
- Coordinates: 50°00′17″N 3°55′16″E
- Country: France
- Region: Hauts-de-France
- Department: Aisne
- Arrondissement: Vervins
- Canton: Vervins
- Intercommunality: Thiérache du Centre

Government
  - Mayor (2026–32): Jean Fourdrignier
- Area^{1}: 26.43 km^{2} (10.20 sq mi)
- Elevation: 193 m (633 ft)
- Highest elevation: 232 m (761 ft)
- Lowest elevation: 171 m (561 ft)
- Population (2023): 1,103
  - Density: 41.73/km^{2} (108.1/sq mi)
- Time zone: UTC+01:00 (CET)
  - Summer (DST): UTC+02:00 (CEST)
- INSEE/Postal code: 02312 /02260
- ^{1} French Land Register data, which excludes lakes, ponds, glaciers > 1 km^{2} (0.386 sq mi or 247 acres) and river estuaries.

La Flamengrie (French pronunciation: [la flamɑ̃ɡʁi]) is a commune in the Aisne department and Hauts-de-France region of northern France.

== Population ==
Historical population
Year	Pop.	±% p.a.
1968	1,041	—
1975	951	−1.28%
1982	1,023	+1.05%
1990	1,073	+0.60%
1999	1,099	+0.27%
2007	1,048	−0.59%
2012	1,138	+1.66%
2017	1,118	−0.35%
2023	1,103	−0.22%
Source: INSEE

== See also ==
- Communes of the Aisne department
