= Barzy =

Barzy may refer to:

- Barzy-en-Thiérache, France
- Barzy-sur-Marne, France
