= Helpe Majeure =

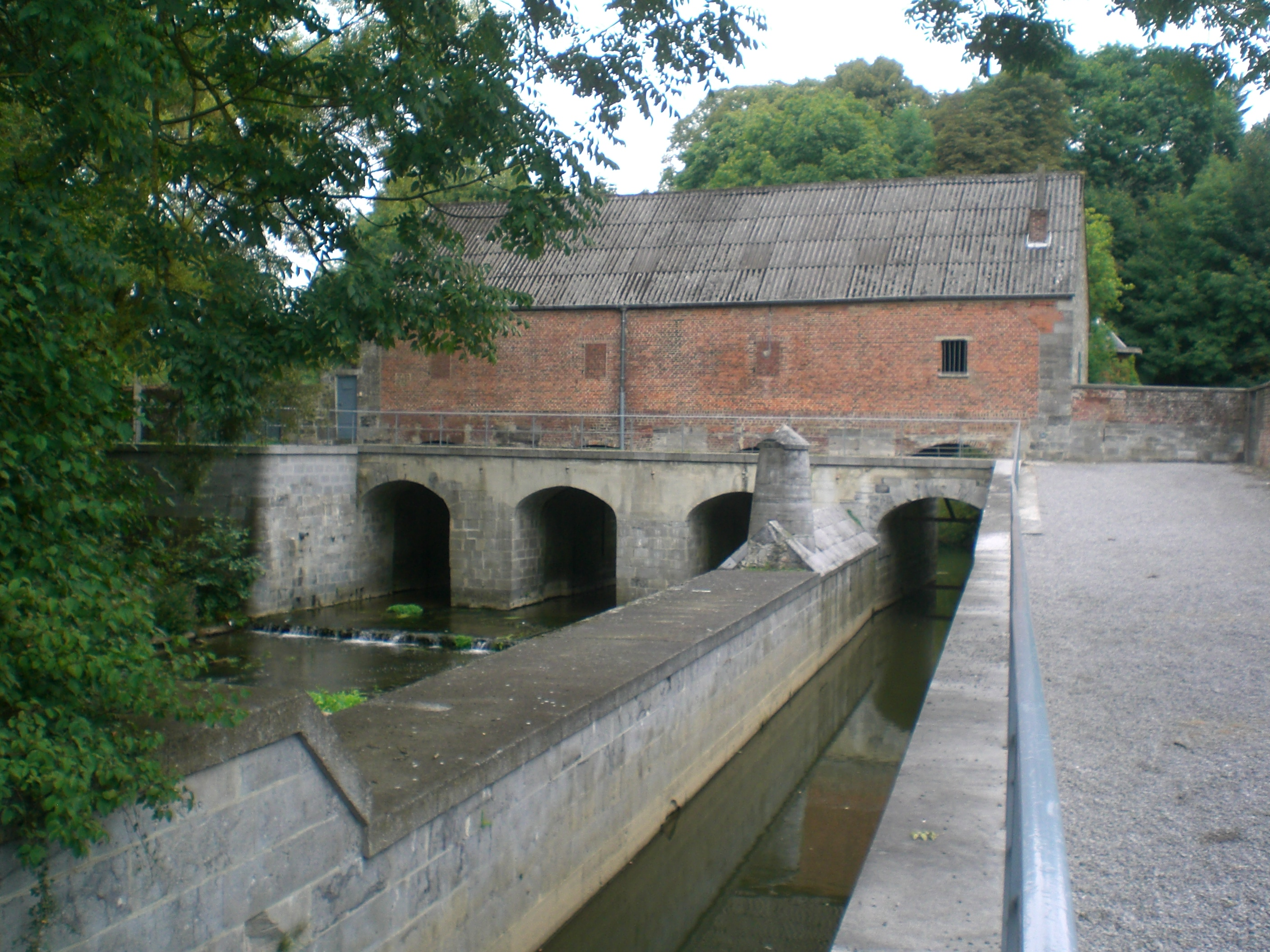
- The weir in Avesnes-sur-Helpe

- Location within France Location within Hauts-de-France

Location
- Country: France

Physical characteristics
- Mouth: Sambre
  - coordinates: 50°10′21″N 3°47′46″E
- Length: 69.1 km (42.9 mi)
- Basin size: 329 km^{2} (127 mi^{2})
- Discharge
  - average: 3.86 m^{3}/s (136 cu ft/s)

Basin features
- Progression: Sambre→ Meuse→ North Sea

Helpe Majeure (French pronunciation: [ɛlp maʒœʁ]) is a river that runs through the Nord department in the Hauts-de-France region of France. It rises in the municipality of Ohain, with about a third of its watershed in Belgium, near the town of Momignies. The river initially marks the Franco-Belgian border as it flows north. Then it turns west and flows for 69 kilometres (43 mi) to its confluence north of Noyelles-sur-Sambre, as a southern tributary of the Sambre.

== See also ==
- Lac du Val-Joly, an artificial lake in France, created by damming the Helpe Majeure
