= Larouillies =

- Commune
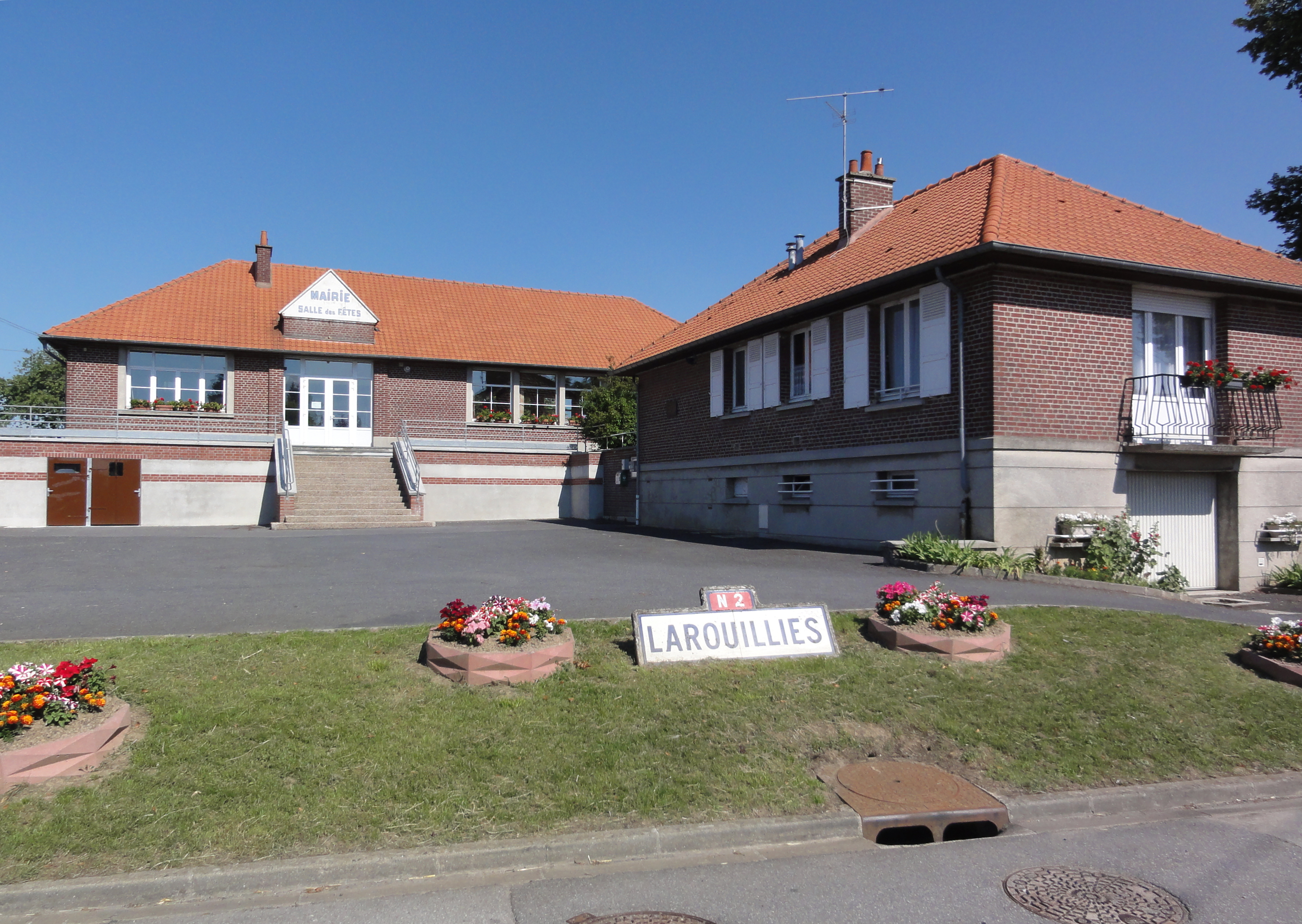
- The town hall in Larouillies

- Coat of arms
- Location of Larouillies
- Location within France Location within Hauts-de-France
- Coordinates: 50°02′05″N 3°55′33″E
- Country: France
- Region: Hauts-de-France
- Department: Nord
- Arrondissement: Avesnes-sur-Helpe
- Canton: Avesnes-sur-Helpe
- Intercommunality: Cœur de l'Avesnois

Government
  - Mayor (2020–2026): Wilfrid Salmon
- Area^{1}: 5.4 km^{2} (2.1 sq mi)
- Elevation: 230 m (750 ft)
- Highest elevation: 231 m (758 ft)
- Lowest elevation: 168 m (551 ft)
- Population (2023): 231
  - Density: 43/km^{2} (110/sq mi)
- Time zone: UTC+01:00 (CET)
  - Summer (DST): UTC+02:00 (CEST)
- INSEE/Postal code: 59333 /59219
- ^{1} French Land Register data, which excludes lakes, ponds, glaciers > 1 km^{2} (0.386 sq mi or 247 acres) and river estuaries.

Larouillies (French pronunciation: [laʁuji]) is a commune in the Nord department in northern France.

== Heraldry ==
| Arms of Larouillies | The arms of Larouillies are blazoned : Bendy Or and gules. (Avesnes-sur-Helpe, Cartignies, Damousies, Dimechaux, Dimont, Felleries, Larouillies, Lomme, and Ramousies use the same arms.) |

== See also ==
- Communes of the Nord department
