= Hanzinne =

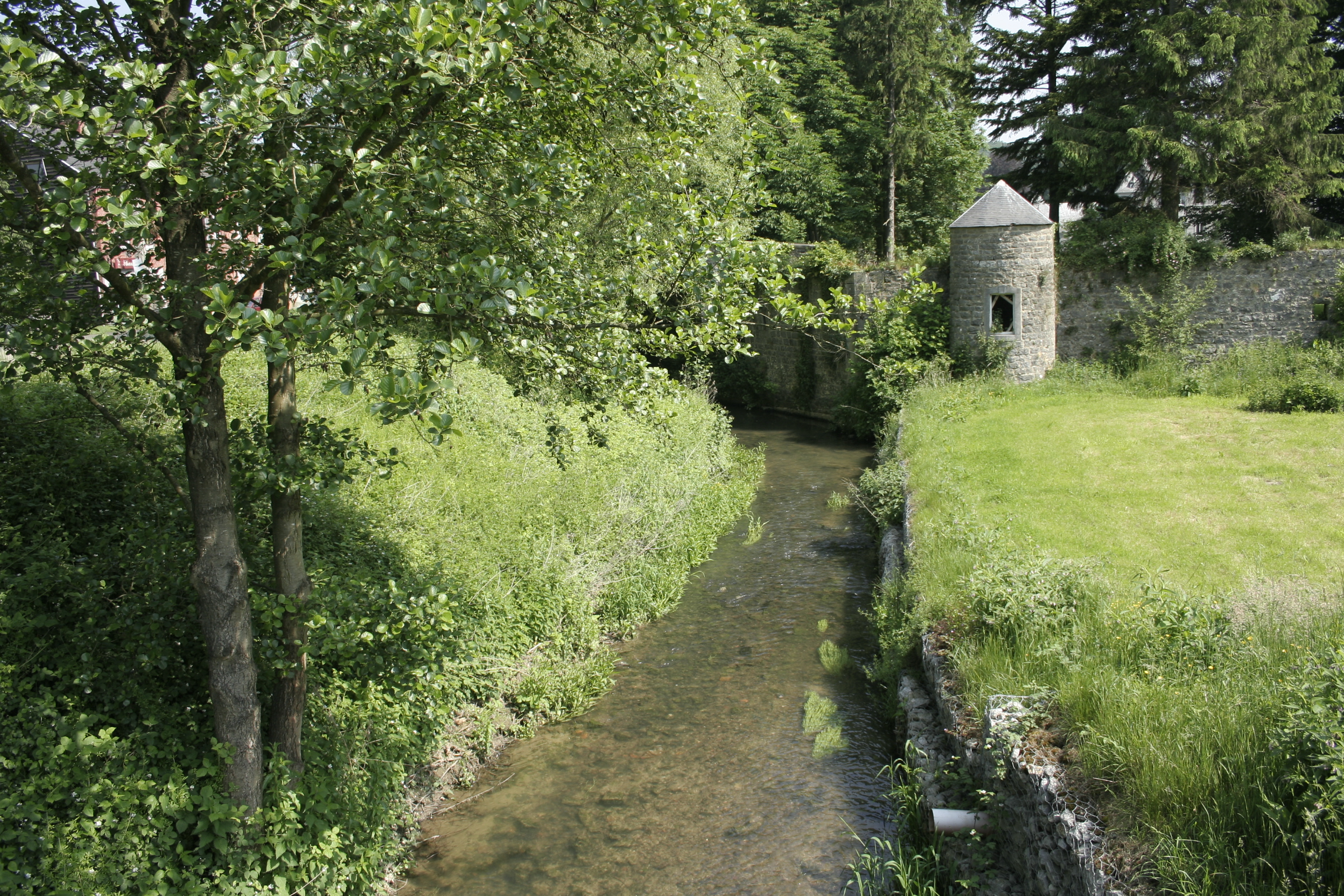
- Hanzinne near Acoz Castle

Location
- Country: Belgium
- Province: Hainaut, Namur

Physical characteristics
- Source
  - location: Hanzinne
- Mouth
  - location: Châtelet
  - coordinates: 50.4°N 4.52°E
- Length: 15 km (9.3 mi)

Basin features
- Progression: Sambre→ Meuse→ North Sea

The Hanzinne is a stream, and a tributary of the river Sambre, in Belgium.

Its source is located in Hanzinne, a part of the Florennes municipality in the province of Namur.

It passes through Hymiée, Gerpinnes, Acoz and Bouffioulx and is connected with river Sambre in Châtelet.

== See also ==
- Meuse (river)
- List of rivers of Belgium
