= Cartignies =

- Commune
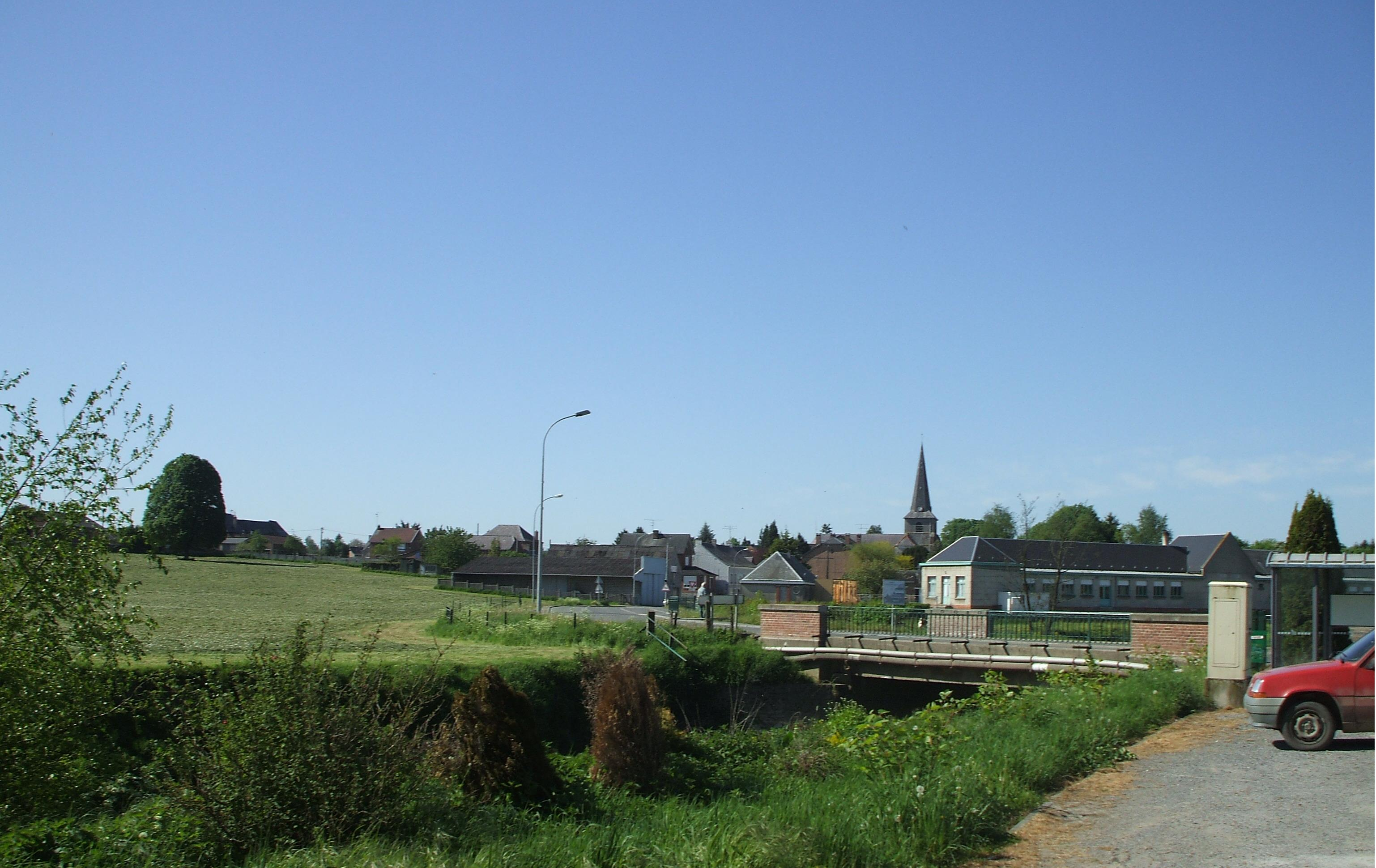
- A general view of Cartignies

- Coat of arms
- Location of Cartignies
- Location within France Location within Hauts-de-France
- Coordinates: 50°05′36″N 3°50′48″E
- Country: France
- Region: Hauts-de-France
- Department: Nord
- Arrondissement: Avesnes-sur-Helpe
- Canton: Avesnes-sur-Helpe
- Intercommunality: CC Cœur de l'Avesnois

Government
  - Mayor (2020–2026): Sabine Caufapé-Soumier
- Area^{1}: 26.41 km^{2} (10.20 sq mi)
- Elevation: 150 m (490 ft)
- Highest elevation: 213 m (699 ft)
- Lowest elevation: 140 m (460 ft)
- Population (2023): 1,209
  - Density: 45.78/km^{2} (118.6/sq mi)
- Time zone: UTC+01:00 (CET)
  - Summer (DST): UTC+02:00 (CEST)
- INSEE/Postal code: 59134 /59244
- ^{1} French Land Register data, which excludes lakes, ponds, glaciers > 1 km^{2} (0.386 sq mi or 247 acres) and river estuaries.

Cartignies (French pronunciation: [kaʁtiɲi]) is a commune in the Nord department in northern France.

== Heraldry ==
Arms of Cartignies	The arms of Cartignies are blazoned : Bendy Or and gules. (Avesnes-sur-Helpe, Cartignies, Damousies, Dimechaux, Dimont, Felleries, Larouillies, Lomme, and Ramousies use the same arms.)

== See also ==
- Communes of the Nord department
