= Round robin (document) =

Technique to conceal signatory roles

A round robin is a document signed by multiple parties in a circle to make it more difficult to determine the order in which it was signed, thus preventing a ringleader from being identified.

== Europe ==
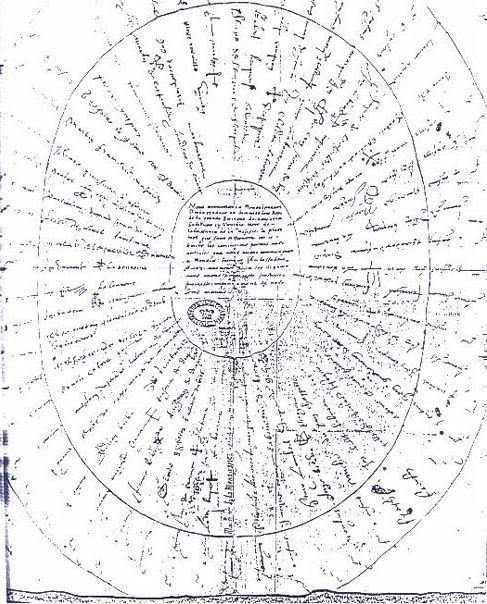
Jessé de Forest's round robin from 1621

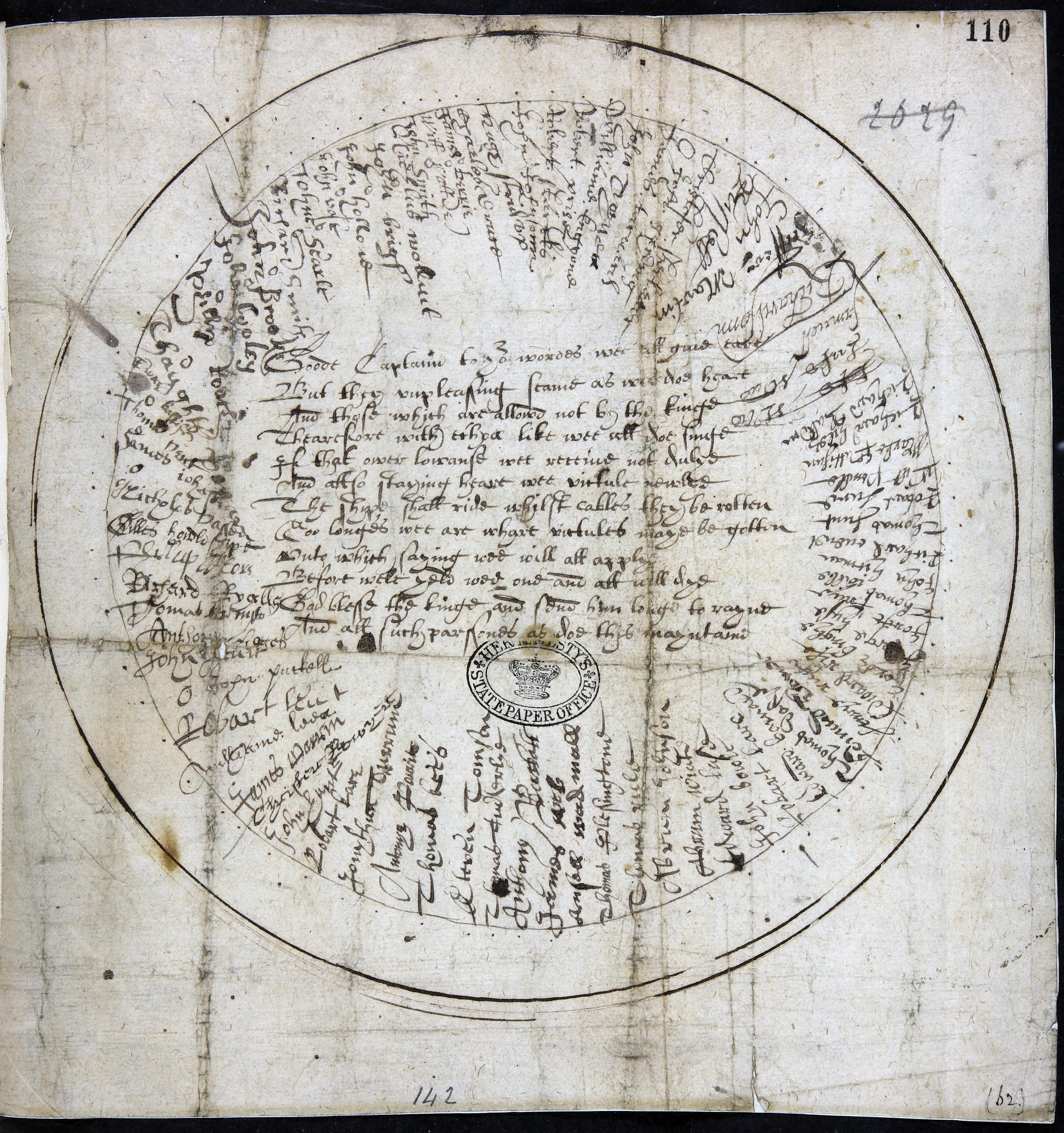
A sailors' round robin from early 1600s, England

The term dates from the 17th-century French: rond ruban, lit. 'round ribbon', which described the practice of signatories to petitions against authority, usually government officials petitioning the Crown, doing so in a circle or ribbon pattern. This disguised the order in which they signed, so that none may be identified as a ringleader. The practice was adopted by sailors petitioning officers in the Royal Navy.

== Asia ==
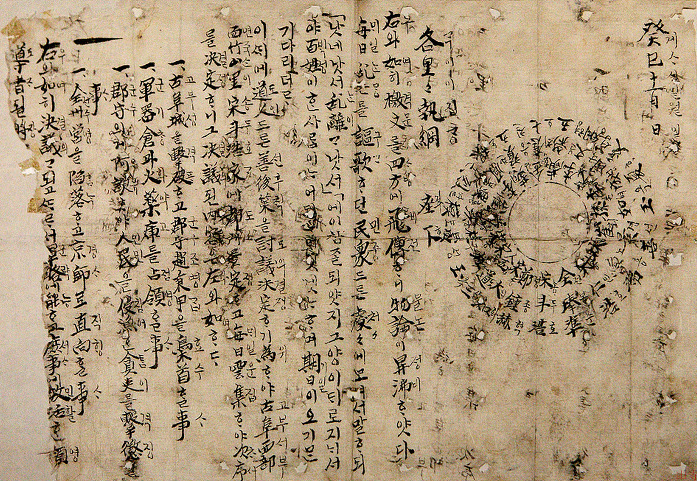
A round robin used in the Tonghak Peasant Revolution, dated 1893

In Asia, this type of document was occasionally used when challenging an authoritarian group. It was used in the Tonghak Peasant Revolution in Korea.

=== Japan ===
The practice was known as Karakasarenban (傘連判状) in feudal Japan. Early examples of it, such as 1557 treaty including Mōri Motonari as a prominent signer, were used for signing alliances between multiple military clans and were intended more for removing the hierarchy and emphasizing the equal status between signers rather than for a disguise. Later usages, including 1681 plea signed by a group of farmers in 25 villages and a similar plea in 1754 signed by 30 local village lords, has more emphasis on hiding the ringleader. In modern Japan, there are more casual usages of the similar style of signing for ceremonial purposes including school graduation and significant events in group sports.

== Spanish–American War ==
A round-robin letter was authored in Cuba after the cessation of hostilities in 1898 by a committee of 10 brigade commanders of the American Army's V Corps including acting brigade commander Theodore Roosevelt during the Spanish–American War, to accelerate the departure of the American Army back to the United States during the rainy disease-plagued summer season. This letter was leaked to the press and embarrassed the administration of US President William McKinley.
