= Damousies =

- Commune
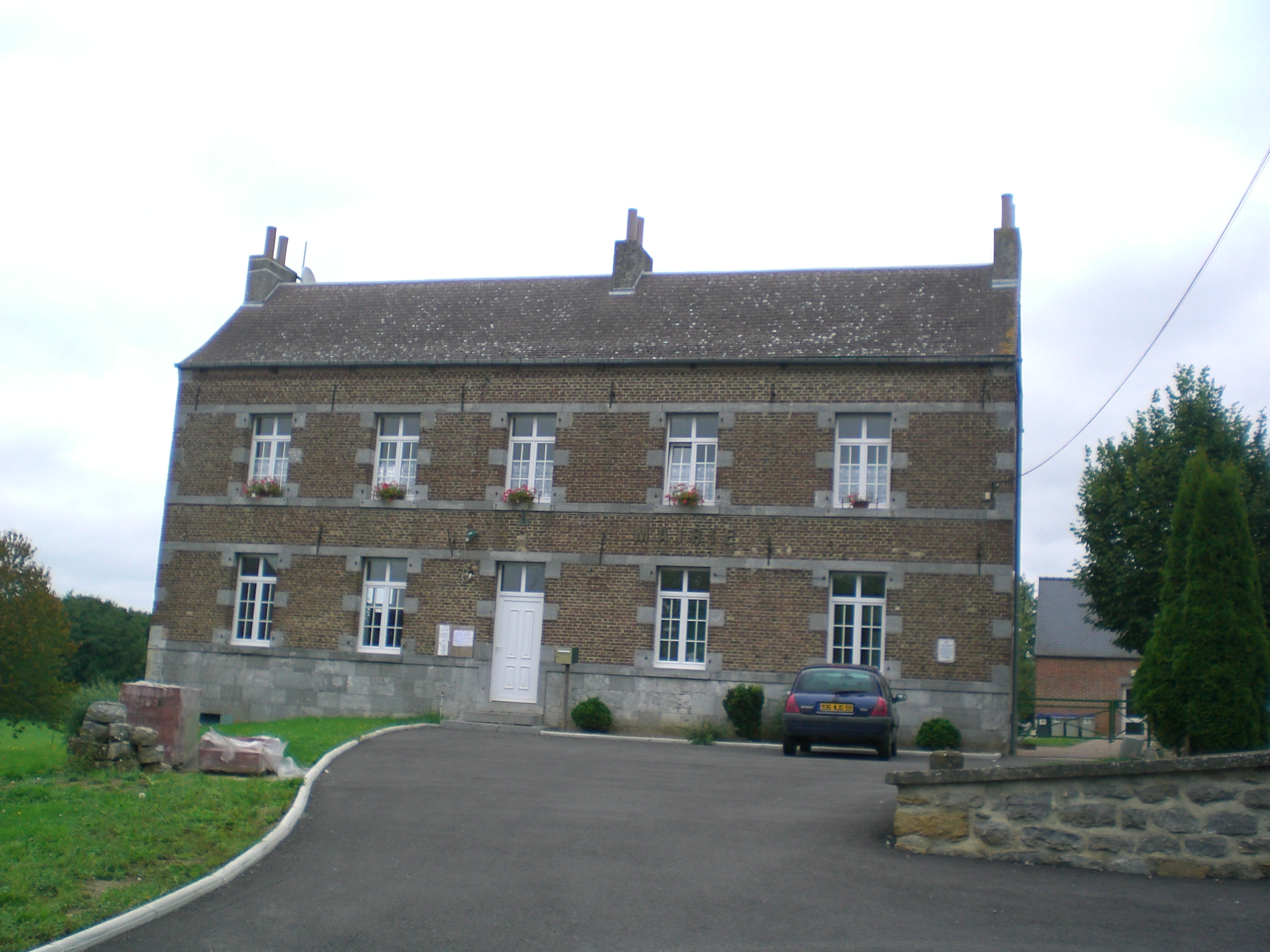
- The town hall in Damousies

- Coat of arms
- Location of Damousies
- Location within France Location within Hauts-de-France
- Coordinates: 50°13′12″N 4°00′52″E
- Country: France
- Region: Hauts-de-France
- Department: Nord
- Arrondissement: Avesnes-sur-Helpe
- Canton: Fourmies
- Intercommunality: CC Cœur de l'Avesnois

Government
  - Mayor (2023–2026): Reinold Masure
- Area^{1}: 5 km^{2} (1.9 sq mi)
- Elevation: 143 m (469 ft)
- Highest elevation: 190 m (620 ft)
- Lowest elevation: 137 m (449 ft)
- Population (2023): 205
  - Density: 41/km^{2} (110/sq mi)
- Time zone: UTC+01:00 (CET)
  - Summer (DST): UTC+02:00 (CEST)
- INSEE/Postal code: 59169 /59680
- ^{1} French Land Register data, which excludes lakes, ponds, glaciers > 1 km^{2} (0.386 sq mi or 247 acres) and river estuaries.

Damousies (French pronunciation: [damuzi]) is a commune in the Nord department in northern France.

== Heraldry ==
Arms of Damousies	The arms of Damousies are blazoned : Bendy Or and gules. (Avesnes-sur-Helpe, Cartignies, Damousies, Dimechaux, Dimont, Felleries, Larouillies, Lomme, and Ramousies use the same arms.)

== See also ==
- Communes of the Nord department
