= Ramousies =

- Commune
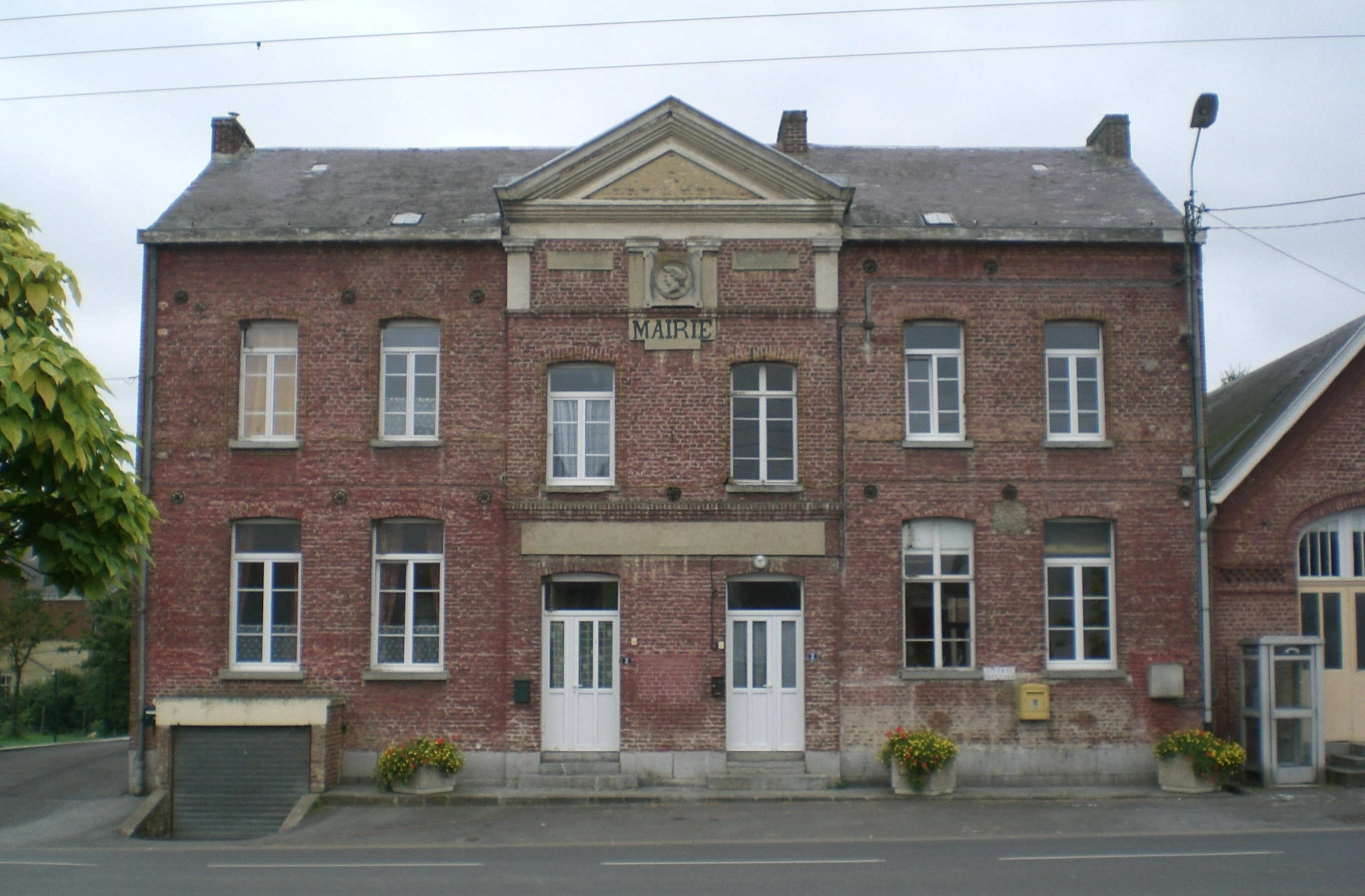
- The town hall in Ramousies

- Coat of arms
- Location of Ramousies
- Location within France Location within Hauts-de-France
- Coordinates: 50°07′04″N 4°02′26″E
- Country: France
- Region: Hauts-de-France
- Department: Nord
- Arrondissement: Avesnes-sur-Helpe
- Canton: Fourmies
- Intercommunality: CC Cœur de l'Avesnois

Government
  - Mayor (2020–2026): Brice Amand
- Area^{1}: 9.6 km^{2} (3.7 sq mi)
- Elevation: 165 m (541 ft)
- Highest elevation: 221 m (725 ft)
- Lowest elevation: 152 m (499 ft)
- Population (2023): 220
  - Density: 23/km^{2} (59/sq mi)
- Time zone: UTC+01:00 (CET)
  - Summer (DST): UTC+02:00 (CEST)
- INSEE/Postal code: 59493 /59177
- ^{1} French Land Register data, which excludes lakes, ponds, glaciers > 1 km^{2} (0.386 sq mi or 247 acres) and river estuaries.

Ramousies (French pronunciation: [ʁamuzi]) is a commune in the Nord department in northern France.

== Heraldry ==
Arms of Ramousies	The arms of Ramousies are blazoned : Bendy Or and gules. (Avesnes-sur-Helpe, Cartignies, Damousies, Dimechaux, Dimont, Felleries, Larouillies, Lomme, and Ramousies use the same arms.)

== See also ==
- Communes of the Nord department
