= Dimechaux =

- Commune
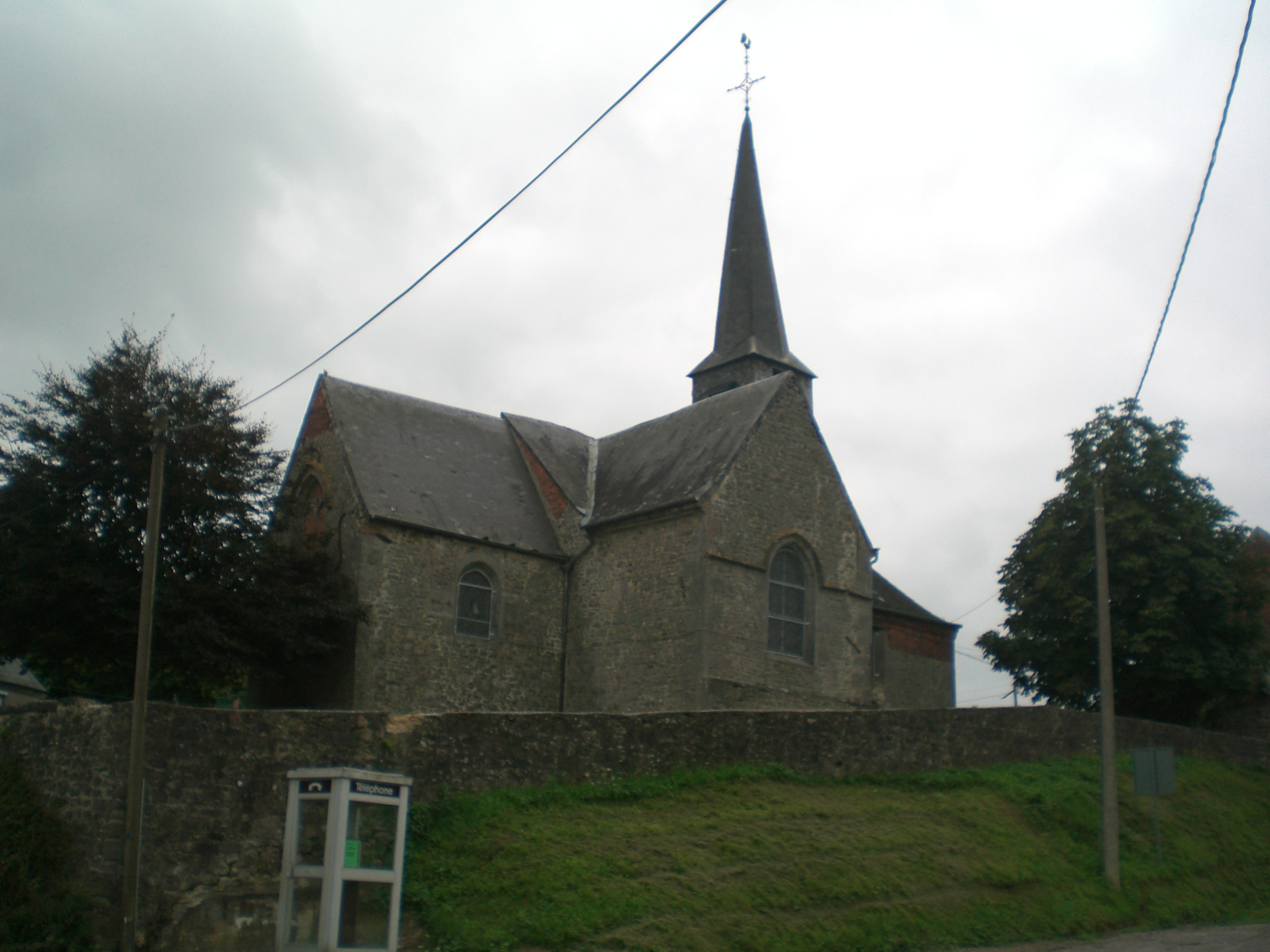
- The church in Dimechaux

- Coat of arms
- Location of Dimechaux
- Location within France Location within Hauts-de-France
- Coordinates: 50°11′46″N 4°02′30″E
- Country: France
- Region: Hauts-de-France
- Department: Nord
- Arrondissement: Avesnes-sur-Helpe
- Canton: Fourmies
- Intercommunality: Cœur de l'Avesnois

Government
  - Mayor (2020–2026): Daniel Étévé
- Area^{1}: 4.85 km^{2} (1.87 sq mi)
- Elevation: 178 m (584 ft)
- Highest elevation: 211 m (692 ft)
- Lowest elevation: 145 m (476 ft)
- Population (2023): 327
  - Density: 67.4/km^{2} (175/sq mi)
- Time zone: UTC+01:00 (CET)
  - Summer (DST): UTC+02:00 (CEST)
- INSEE/Postal code: 59174 /59740
- ^{1} French Land Register data, which excludes lakes, ponds, glaciers > 1 km^{2} (0.386 sq mi or 247 acres) and river estuaries.

Dimechaux is a commune in the Nord department in northern France.

== Heraldry ==
Arms of Dimechaux	The arms of Dimechaux are blazoned : Bendy Or and gules. (Avesnes-sur-Helpe, Cartignies, Damousies, Dimechaux, Dimont, Felleries, Larouillies, Lomme, and Ramousies use the same arms.)

== See also ==
- Communes of the Nord department
