= Ormes Stadium =

French sports stadium

Stade des Ormes
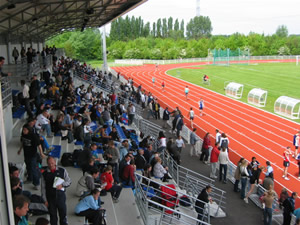

- Location within France
- Address: 24 rue de Lompret; 59160 Lomme
- Coordinates: 50.656°N 2.991°E
- Owner: Town of Lomme
- Capacity: 1500

Construction
- Built: 24 September 2004

Tenants
- OSM Lomme Athlétisme; Lille Métropole rugby club

The Ormes Stadium (French: Stade des Ormes) is an athletics stadium located at Lomme, France along the street Lompret and seats 1500 people.

The track was resurfaced in 2020 as part of a 396,000 EUR (US$443,000) renovation. The stadium began to host racewalking competitions in 2021.
