= Jessé de Forest =

French Huguenot emigrant leader (c.1576–1578–1624)

Jessé de Forest (c. 1576–1578 – October 22, 1624) was the leader of a group of Walloon Huguenots who fled Europe due to religious persecution. They emigrated to what would become New Netherland in 1624.

== Background ==
Jessé de Forest was born between 1576 and 1578, in Avesnes (County of Hainaut, now Nord, France). The family name originated from the village of Forest in the canton of Landrecies near Avesnes. (A Sports Illustrated article incorrectly claims that Jessé was a son of the French king Henri IV.) Around 1609, he left Avesnes for Sedan and Montcornet before settling in Leiden, the Netherlands.

In Leiden, he moved to obtain the right to emigrate with his own and other Walloon families to the New World. During his stay, he also met Pilgrim Fathers, future passengers of the Mayflower. De Forest served with Prince Maurice of Nassau as a lieutenant and captain.

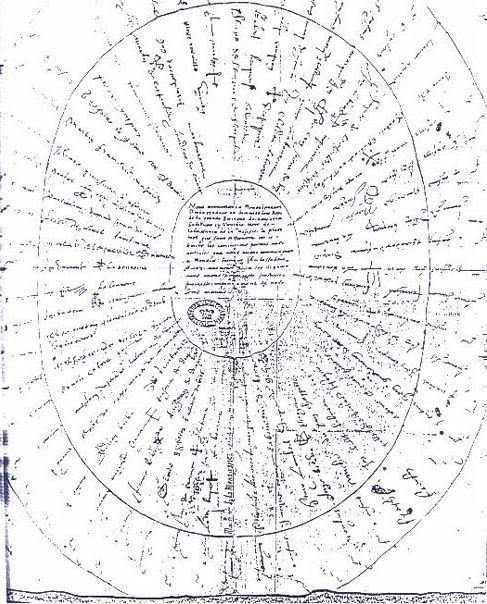
The Round Robin Petition for Freedom

On February 5, 1621, Jessé de Forest sent a round robin petition, to Dudley Carleton, 1st Viscount Dorchester, English ambassador to The Hague. It applied for permission to settle about fifty Walloon and French Huguenot families that planned to follow the Puritans to America (then called the West Indies) in Virginia. De Forest asked to dispose over a territory of eight English miles radius. This document is now preserved in the British Public Record Office. On August 11, 1621, the Virginia Company gave an agreement in principle, but raised some restrictions. The worst one was the refusal to allow the settlers to dwell together in one autonomous colony. De Forest declined this proposition.

== New-Belgium ==
It was de Forest's desire to establish a Colony in the New World, so that the Walloons could practice their Reformed Protestant Christianity without persecution. He then sought permission from the Dutch to establish a colony in what is now New York City. He was granted permission. He assembled approximately 60 families of Walloons and Dutch Protestants for the settlement in New Amsterdam, New Netherland. The first permanent settlers would arrive in New Amsterdam during May 1624 (without de Forest).

The foundation of the Dutch West India Company in 1621 had given rise to multiple opportunities. In 1581, Philip II of Spain had prohibited commerce within his realm with Dutch ships, including in Brazil. Since the Dutch had invested large sums in financing sugar production in the Brazilian Northeast, a conflict began for control of the area. Proposing his services and those of his fellow countrymen to the Dutch West India Company, de Forest informed them that a group of families practicing various trades had the opportunity to emigrate to America. The States of The Netherlands, realizing the importance of such an opening for future colonization, immediately consulted the Directors of the Company, who were meeting in The Hague.

On August 27, 1622, after efforts delivered by Willem Usselincx and Jessé de Forest, the latter finally received the authorization to emigrate with other families to the West Indies. Left on reconnaissance for the coasts of Guyana in 1623, Jessé de Forest died on the Oyapock River bank (present borderline between Brazil and French Guiana), on October 22, 1624. Ten years later, his daughter Rachel (who married Jean de la Montagne, who became the colony's first surgeon and a pivotal leader in the colony) and Jessé's sons Isaac and Henri and other family members joined New-Belgium ten years later in the territories surrounding the future New York City.

== Legacy ==
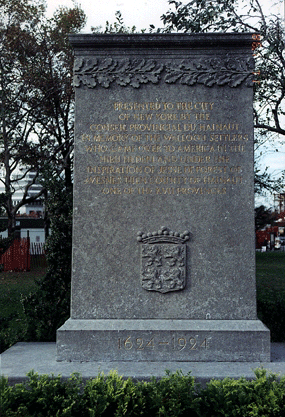
Walloon Monument

There is a monument in the Battery Park section of lower Manhattan, New York City called the Walloon Settlers Memorial. That monument was given to the City of New York by the Belgian Province of Hainaut in honor of the inspiration of Jessé de Forest in founding New York City. Baron de Cartier de Marchienne, representing the government and Albert I, King of Belgium, presented the monument to Mayor John F. Hylan for the City of New York on May 18, 1924. There is also a monument in Jessé de Forest's honor in Avesnes, France, the College Jesse de Forest and Jesse de Forest Avenue. He also has been coined as a “Founder” of New Amsterdam by some.

== Other sources ==
- De Forest, John William The De Forests of Avesnes (and of New Netherland): A Huguenot thread in American colonial history, 1494 to the present time (New Haven, CT: The Tuttle, Morehouse & Taylor Co. 1900)
- De Forest, Emile Johnston A Walloon Family in America; Lockwood De Forest and His Forbears; in Two Volumes. Together with a Voyage to Guiana, Being the Journal of Jesse De Forest and His Colonists 1623-1625 (The Apple Manor Press. 2007, originally published in 1914)
- Griffis, William Elliot The Story of the Walloons at Home, in Lands of Exile and in America (Houghton Mifflin. 1923)
- Bayer, Henry G. The Belgians, First Settlers in New York and in the Middle States (Bowie, Md.: Heritage Books, 1987, c1925)
