= Dimont =

- Commune
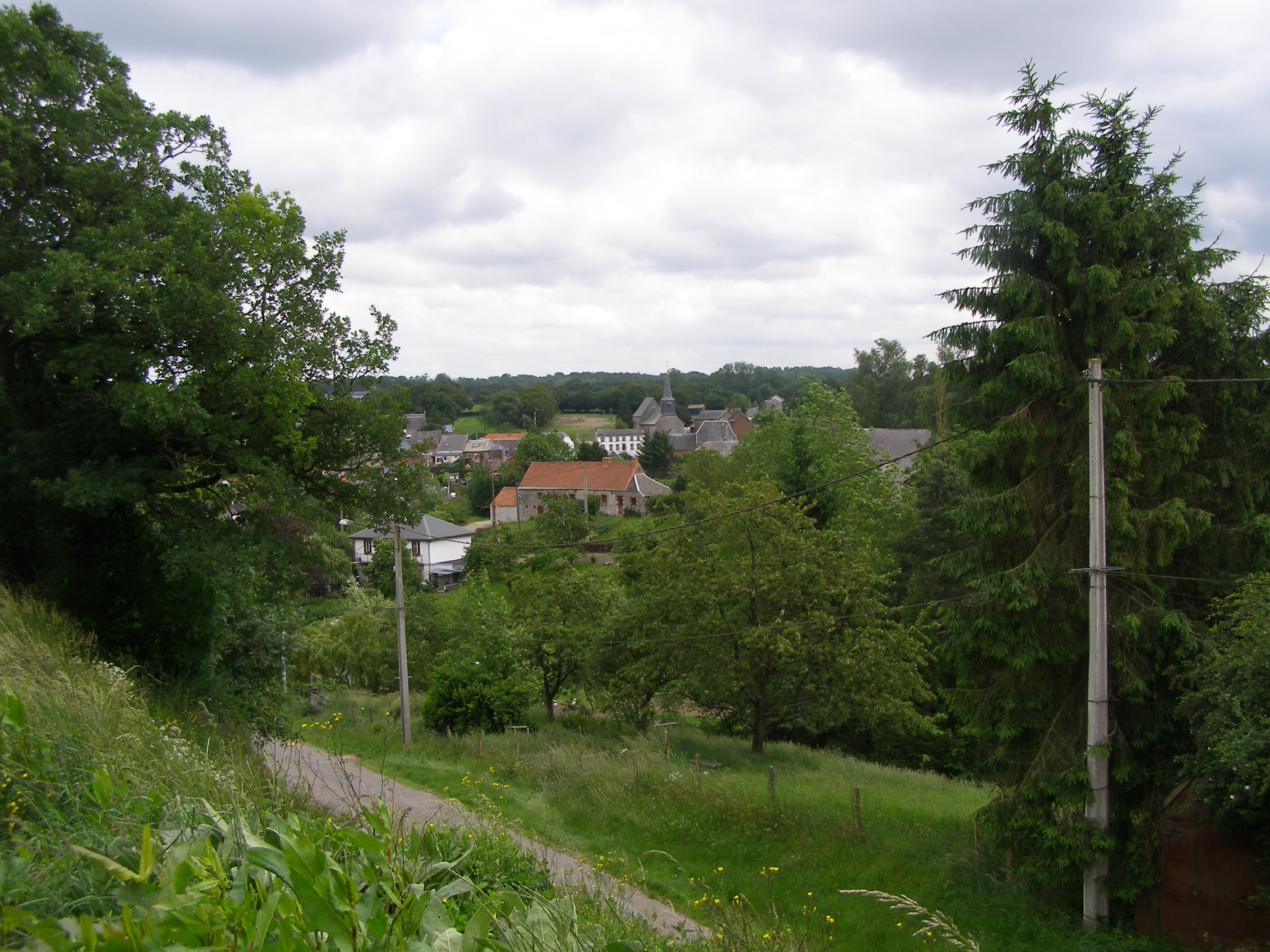
- A general view of Dimont

- Coat of arms
- Location of Dimont
- Location within France Location within Hauts-de-France
- Coordinates: 50°11′01″N 4°01′15″E
- Country: France
- Region: Hauts-de-France
- Department: Nord
- Arrondissement: Avesnes-sur-Helpe
- Canton: Fourmies
- Intercommunality: CC Cœur de l'Avesnois

Government
  - Mayor (2020–2026): Vincent Couret
- Area^{1}: 7.49 km^{2} (2.89 sq mi)
- Highest elevation: 211 m (692 ft)
- Lowest elevation: 149 m (489 ft)
- Population (2023): 289
  - Density: 38.6/km^{2} (99.9/sq mi)
- Time zone: UTC+01:00 (CET)
  - Summer (DST): UTC+02:00 (CEST)
- INSEE/Postal code: 59175 /59216
- ^{1} French Land Register data, which excludes lakes, ponds, glaciers > 1 km^{2} (0.386 sq mi or 247 acres) and river estuaries.

Dimont (French pronunciation: [dimɔ̃]) is a commune in the Nord department in northern France.

It is about 10 km (6.2 mi) south of Maubeuge, and is 191 km (119 mi) from the capital, Paris.

== Heraldry ==
Arms of Dimont	The arms of Dimont are blazoned : Bendy Or and gules. (Avesnes-sur-Helpe, Cartignies, Damousies, Dimechaux, Dimont, Felleries, Larouillies, Lomme, and Ramousies use the same arms.)

== See also ==
- Communes of the Nord department
