= Felleries =

- Commune
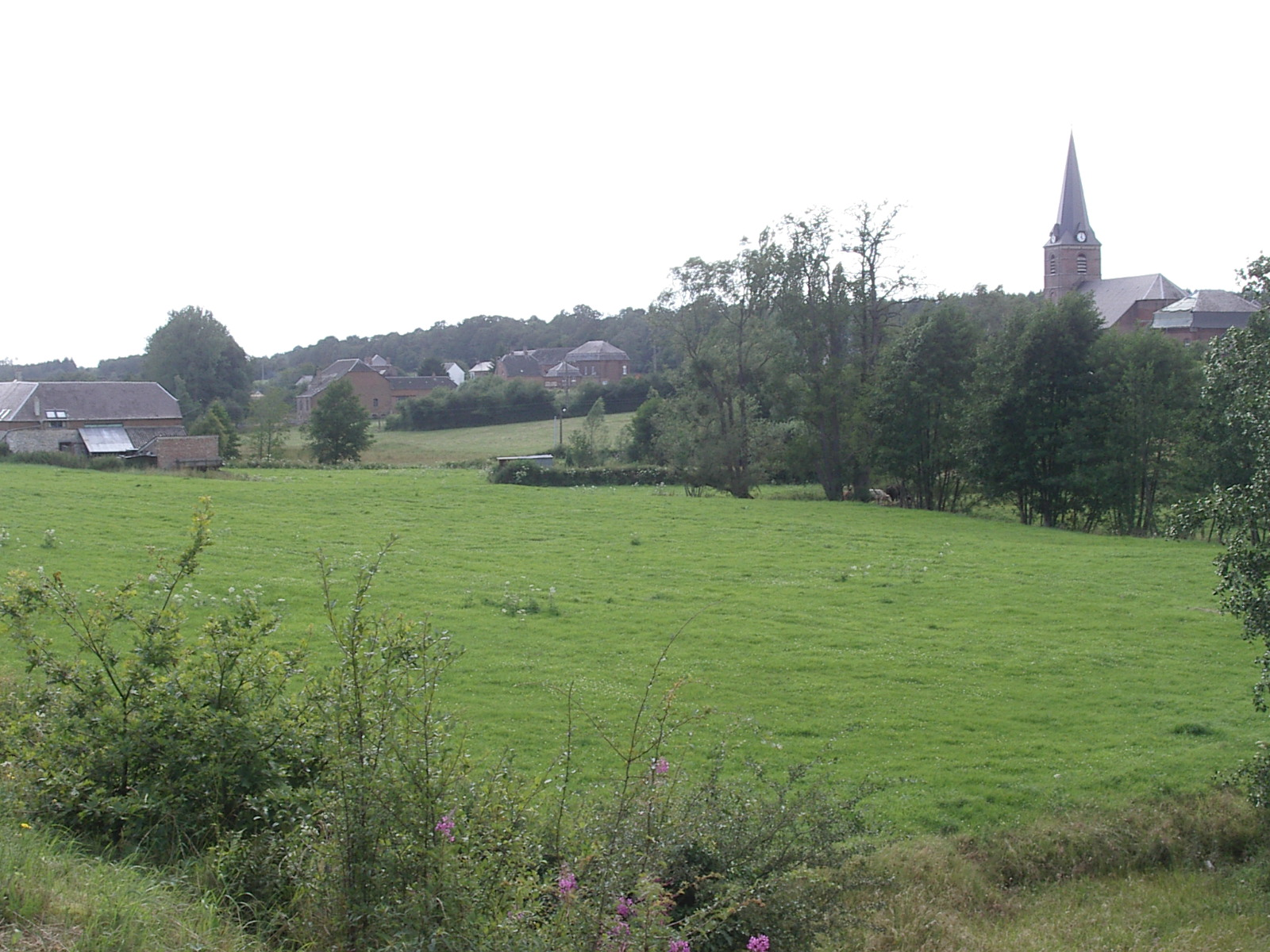
- A general view of Felleries

- Coat of arms
- Location of Felleries
- Location within France Location within Hauts-de-France
- Coordinates: 50°08′37″N 4°01′33″E
- Country: France
- Region: Hauts-de-France
- Department: Nord
- Arrondissement: Avesnes-sur-Helpe
- Canton: Fourmies
- Intercommunality: Cœur de l'Avesnois

Government
  - Mayor (2023–2026): Pascal Noyon
- Area^{1}: 19.49 km^{2} (7.53 sq mi)
- Elevation: 184 m (604 ft)
- Highest elevation: 236 m (774 ft)
- Lowest elevation: 160 m (520 ft)
- Population (2023): 1,433
  - Density: 73.52/km^{2} (190.4/sq mi)
- Demonym: Fleurisien(ne)s
- Time zone: UTC+01:00 (CET)
  - Summer (DST): UTC+02:00 (CEST)
- INSEE/Postal code: 59226 /59740
- ^{1} French Land Register data, which excludes lakes, ponds, glaciers > 1 km^{2} (0.386 sq mi or 247 acres) and river estuaries.

Felleries (French pronunciation: [fɛlʁi]) is a commune in the Nord département in northern France.

== Heraldry ==
Arms of Felleries	The arms of Felleries are blazoned : Bendy Or and gules. (Avesnes-sur-Helpe, Cartignies, Damousies, Dimechaux, Dimont, Felleries, Larouillies, Lomme, and Ramousies use the same arms.)

== See also ==
- Communes of the Nord department
