= Lac du Val-Joly =

- Location within France
- Location: Nord département, Hauts-de-France, France
- Coordinates: 50°06′54″N 4°08′07″E
- Type: reservoir
- Surface elevation: 183 metres (600 ft)

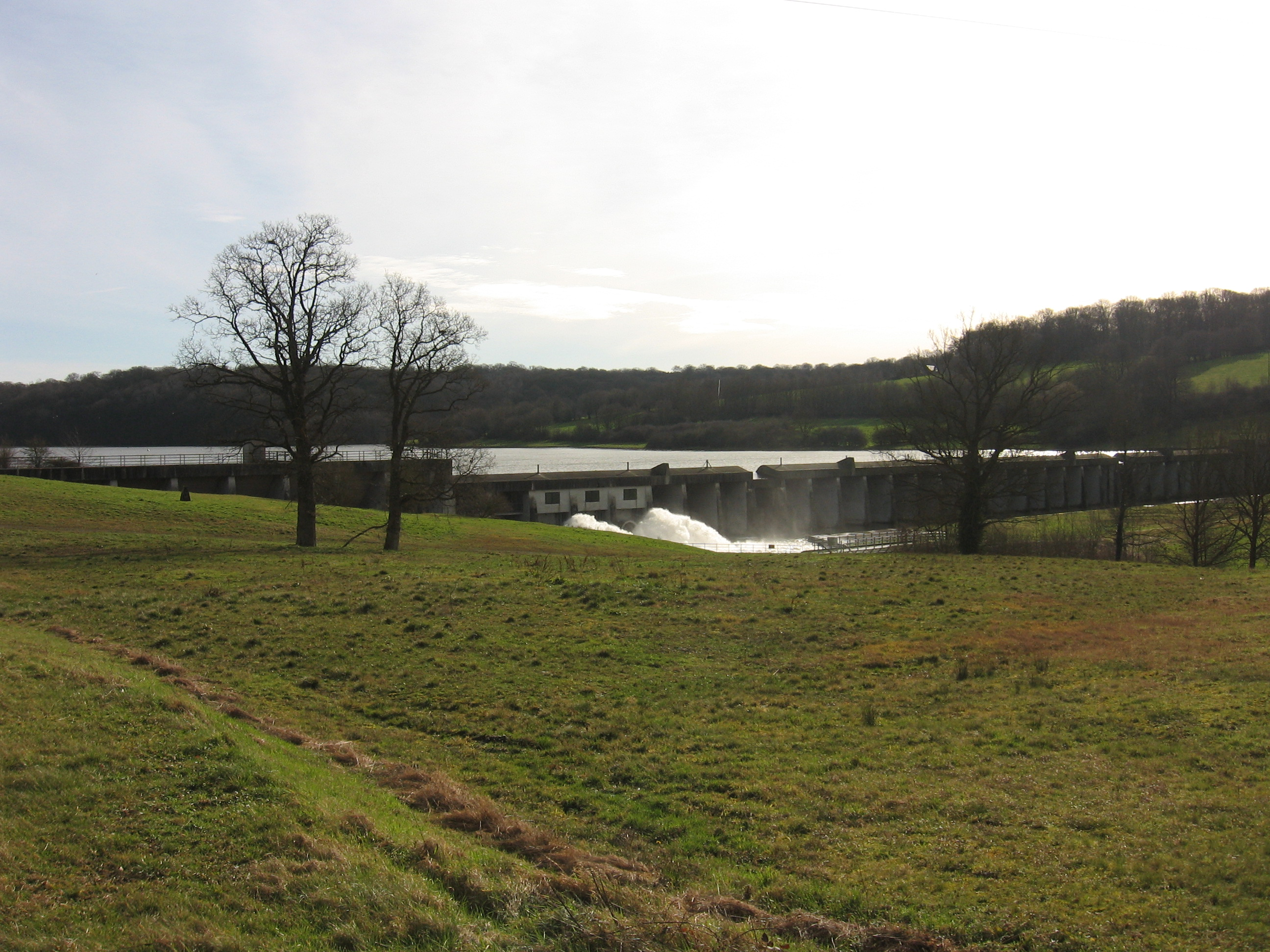
The dam and surrounding country at the Lac du Val-Joly

The Lac du Val-Joly is an artificial lake in France, constructed before the 1970s.

Located 2 kilometres (1.2 mi) from the Belgian border, and close to Willies in the Nord département, 183 metres (600 ft) asl on the course of the Helpe Majeure, a tributary of the Sambre.

It was created with a dam to help regulate the flow of the Helpe Majeure, and also as a hydropower source, and as a source of water to cool the old thermal power station, Pont-sur-Sambre.

The lake has many species of fauna (some introduced by humans), and is currently classified as a Special Area of Conservation.
