= Lomme =

- Associated commune of Lille
- Location of Lomme
- Location within France Location within Hauts-de-France
- Coordinates: 50°38′09″N 3°00′51″E
- Country: France
- Region: Hauts-de-France
- Department: Nord
- Arrondissement: Lille
- Canton: Lille-6
- Commune: Lille
- Area^{1}: 9.33 km^{2} (3.60 sq mi)
- Population (2022): 28,165
  - Density: 3,020/km^{2} (7,820/sq mi)
- Time zone: UTC+01:00 (CET)
  - Summer (DST): UTC+02:00 (CEST)
- Postal code: 59160
- ^{1} French Land Register data, which excludes lakes, ponds, glaciers > 1 km^{2} (0.386 sq mi or 247 acres) and river estuaries.

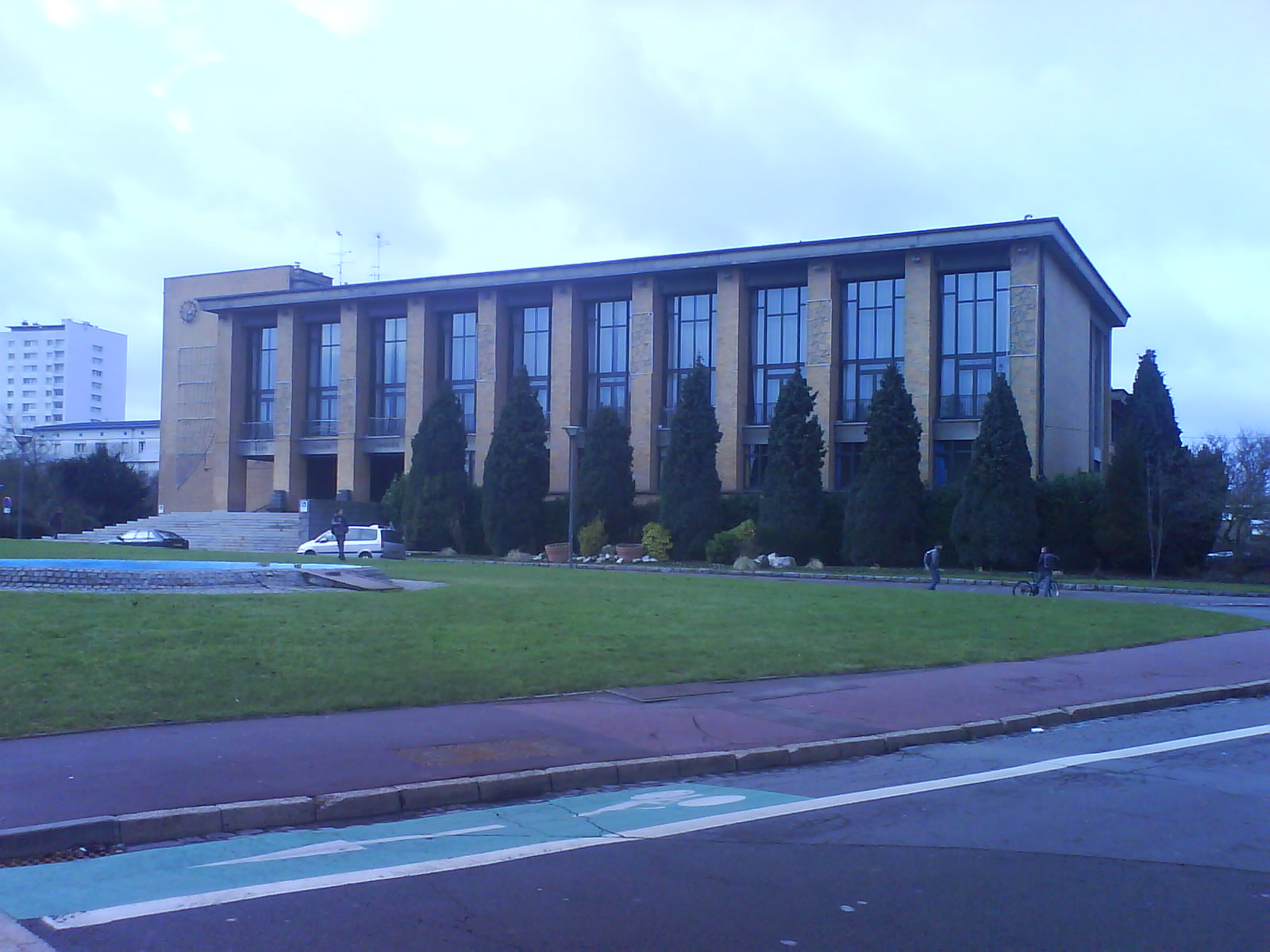
Lomme

Lomme (French pronunciation: [lɔm]; Dutch: Olm) was a commune in the Nord département of northern France. It was absorbed as a commune associée by the city of Lille in 2000. At the 1999 census its population was 27,940 inhabitants. Its population was 28,165 in 2022.

The commune is home to the Ormes Stadium used in sport of athletics meetings.

== Heraldry ==
Arms of Lomme	The arms of Lomme are blazoned : Bendy Or and gules. (Avesnes-sur-Helpe, Cartignies, Damousies, Dimechaux, Dimont, Felleries, Larouillies, Lomme, and Ramousies use the same arms.)
