= Barzy-en-Thiérache =

- Commune
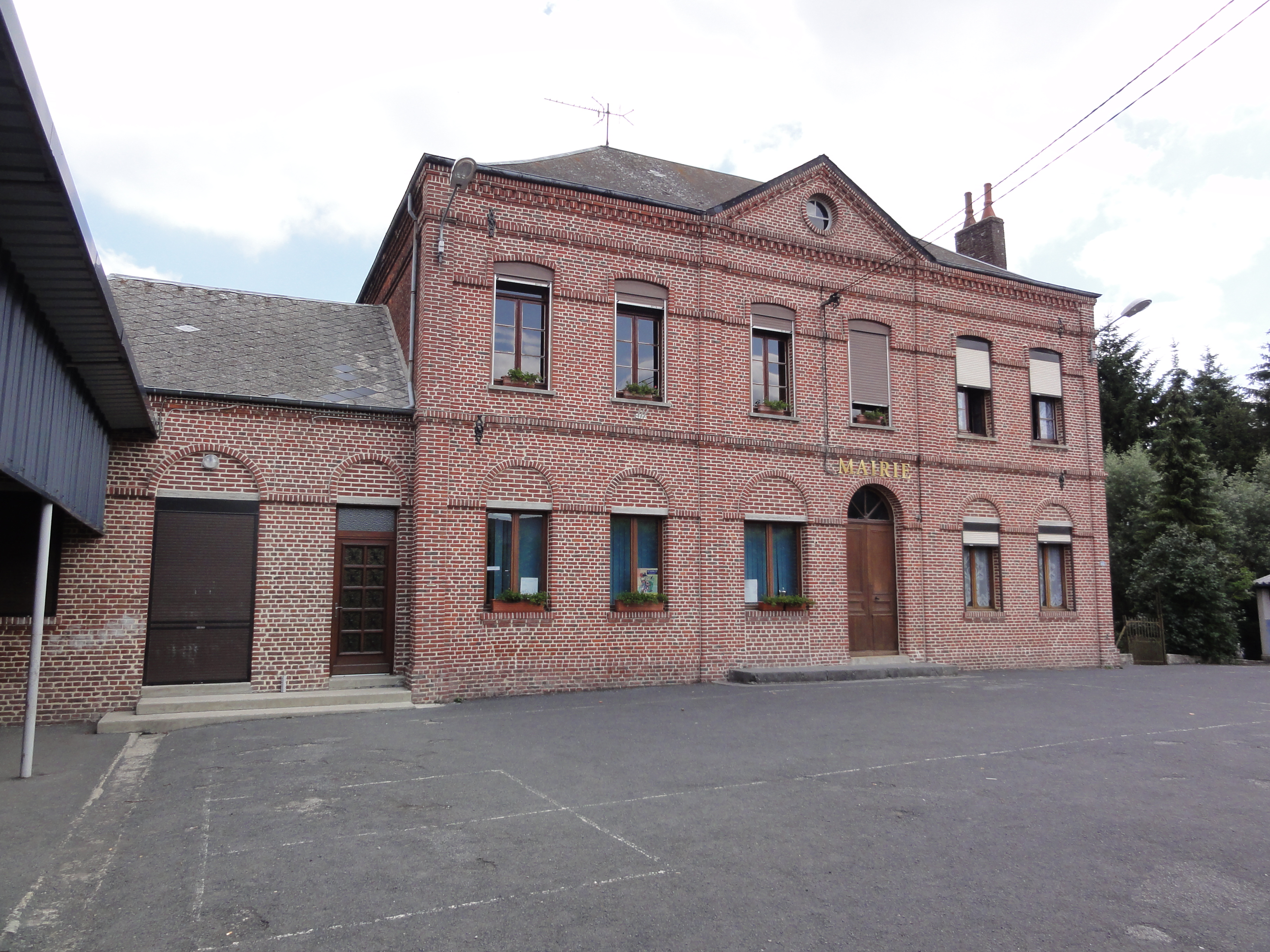
- Town hall

- Coat of arms
- Location of Barzy-en-Thiérache
- Location within France Location within Hauts-de-France
- Coordinates: 50°02′38″N 3°44′49″E
- Country: France
- Region: Hauts-de-France
- Department: Aisne
- Arrondissement: Vervins
- Canton: Guise
- Intercommunality: Thiérache du Centre

Government
  - Mayor (2026–32): Jonathan Wilmart
- Area^{1}: 7.63 km^{2} (2.95 sq mi)
- Elevation: 166 m (545 ft)
- Highest elevation: 202 m (663 ft)
- Lowest elevation: 152 m (499 ft)
- Population (2023): 316
  - Density: 41.4/km^{2} (107/sq mi)
- Time zone: UTC+01:00 (CET)
  - Summer (DST): UTC+02:00 (CEST)
- INSEE/Postal code: 02050 /02170
- ^{1} French Land Register data, which excludes lakes, ponds, glaciers > 1 km^{2} (0.386 sq mi or 247 acres) and river estuaries.

Barzy-en-Thiérache (French pronunciation: [baʁzi ɑ̃ tjeʁaʃ], literally Barzy in Thiérache) is a commune in the department of Aisne in the Hauts-de-France region of northern France.

== Geography ==
Barzy-en-Thiérache is located some 40 km south by southeast of Cambrai and 40 km northeast of Saint-Quentin. The Route Nationale D1043 from Bergues-sur-Sambre to Le Nouvion-en-Thiérache passes through the southern tip of the commune but does not provide direct access. Access to the village and the commune is by road D261 running north-east from the D1043 continuing north-east as the D262. The D664 also runs north from the village to Le Rejet-du-Moulin. The eastern border of the commune is also the border between Aisne and Nord departments. There are four hamlets in the commune other than the village: La Justice, Etreux, Mon Idée, and La Haie Long Pre. The rest of the commune is entirely farmland.

The Sambre river runs from east to west through the commune and the village fed by the Ruisseau du Vivier Bare. The Sambre river continues west to join the Sambre–Oise Canal.

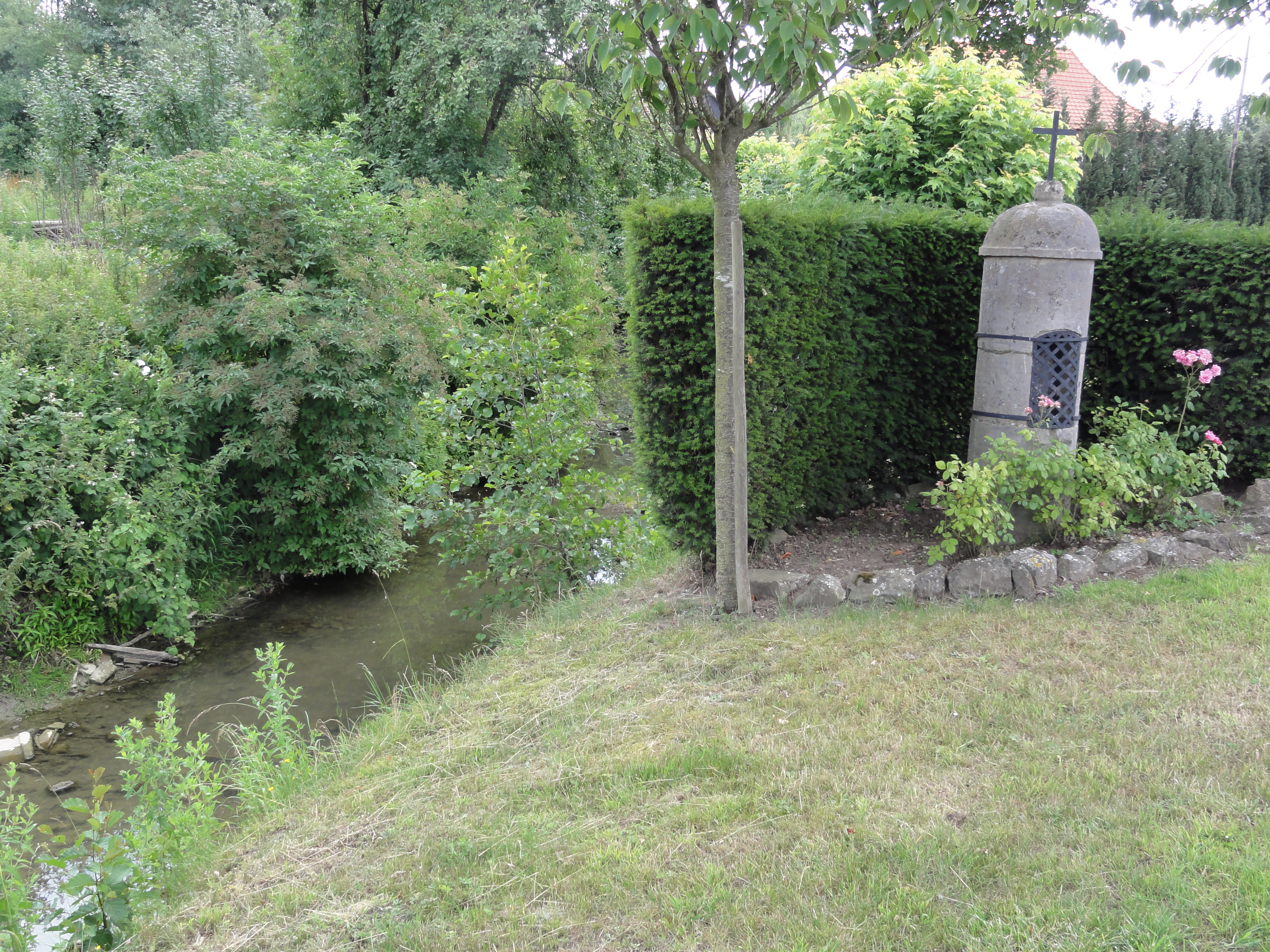
Chapel next to the Sambre

== History ==
In 1153 the name of the village was Villa que dicitur Baisis. It then became Barisis in 1227. The first name was given as Baisse for the neighborhood. The second name was Barri then became Barrié then Barrière. This tends to demonstrate the frontier character of the village with the Sambre running through it. The part of the village north of the Sambre was under the stewardship of the Landrecy family (County of Hainaut). The southern part of the village was under the stewardship of Laon and the lordship of Lesquielles (Thiérache-Picardy).

In 1956 the name of the commune was Barzy which then changed to Barzy-en-Thiérache.

On 7 Thermidor Year 2 (August 1794) the enemy invaded the village and there was one civilian casualty - Joseph Licking.

Towards the end of the First World War, on 5 November 1918, the advance of French and British troops was stopped in a bloodbath 500 metres from the village (25 soldiers and 2 civilians were killed). On 6 November, after a violent French bombardment, the 73rd Infantry Regiment and the 59th Algerian Riflemen liberated the commune at 5.30am and released nearly a thousand inhabitants and refugees. For these events, the village was decorated with the Croix de Guerre 1914-1918.

=== Heraldry ===
Arms of Aigrefeuille d'Aunis	The official status of the blazon remains to be determined Blazon: Party per fesse, at 1 chevronny in Or and sable; at 2 party per pale first argent with three lions gules, second azure with three fleurs de lis of Or 2 and 1; over all debruised by a fesse wavy Vert fretty of Gules.

== Population ==
Historical population
Year	Pop.	±% p.a.
1968	405	—
1975	335	−2.67%
1982	317	−0.79%
1990	308	−0.36%
1999	313	+0.18%
2007	294	−0.78%
2012	310	+1.07%
2017	330	+1.26%
2023	316	−0.72%
Source: INSEE

== Culture and heritage ==
=== Civil heritage ===
The commune has a number of buildings and structures that are registered as historical monuments:

- A Farmhouse at Grand Rue 13 (1908)
- A House at Grand Rue 14 (19th century)
- A Farmhouse at Grand Rue 15 (1760)
- A Farmhouse at Grand Rue 26 (18th century)
- The Town Hall / School at Grand Rue 43 (1863)
- A Farmhouse at Grand Rue 6 (1880)
- The War memorial at Rue Neuve (1921) was the work of Coulon, a marble sculptor from Le Nouvion-en-Thiérache in 1920–1921. The monument mentions, in addition to the victims from the village, the participation of the Algerian Riflemen who died to liberate the commune. There is a second memorial in the cemetery with a difference of three names which could not be agreed.
- A Farmhouse at 4 CD 26 de Pinon (19th century)
- A Farmhouse at 3 Rue de Sart (19th century)
- Houses and Farms (17th-20th centuries)

=== Religious heritage ===
The commune has several religious buildings and structures that are registered as historical monuments:

- A Presbytery (1788)
- An Oratory at Grand Rue (1724)
- The Parish Church of the Assumption (1705). It was rebuilt in 1705 with an older choir. There is a grotto of Lourdes dating from the 20th century. The Church contains several items that are registered as historical objects:
  - The Furniture in the Church
  - A Ciborium (1819)
  - A Painting: The Assumption (19th century)
  - A Statue: Virgin and child (1724)
  - 6 Stained glass windows (Bays 5 to 10) (1922)
  - 4 Stained glass windows (Bays 1 to 4) (1872)
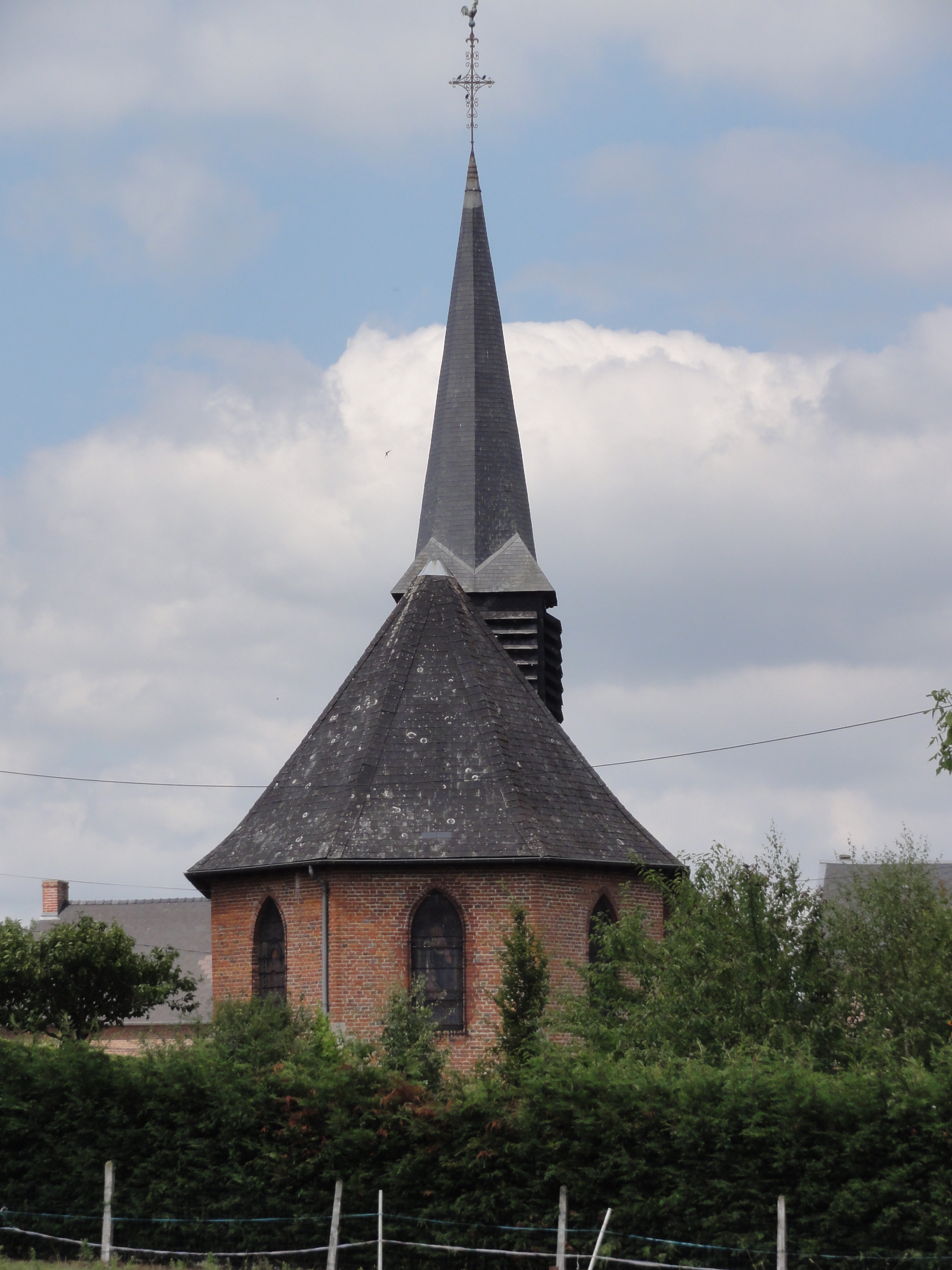
The Church of the Assumption.

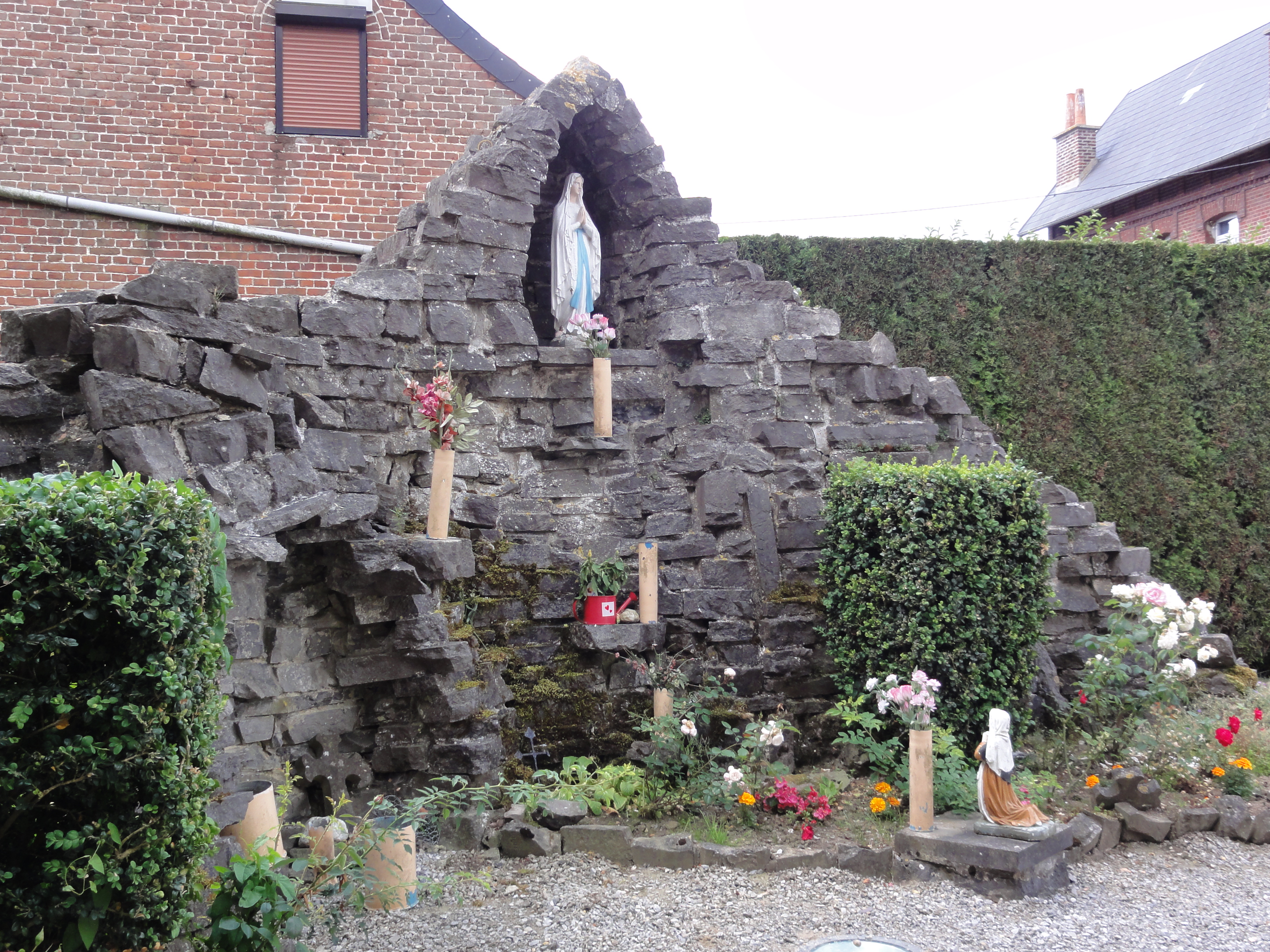
Grotto of Lourdes.

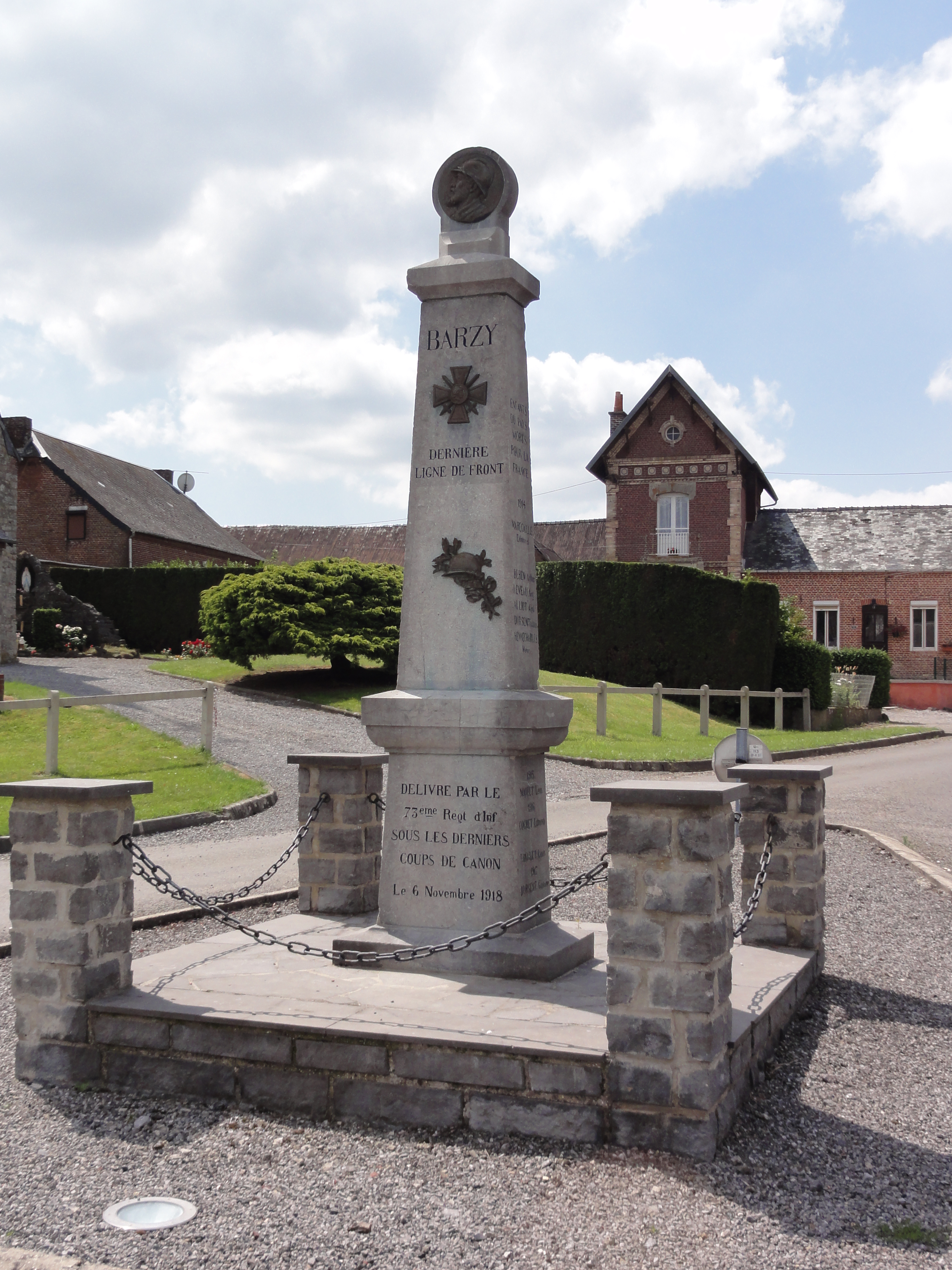
The War Memorial.

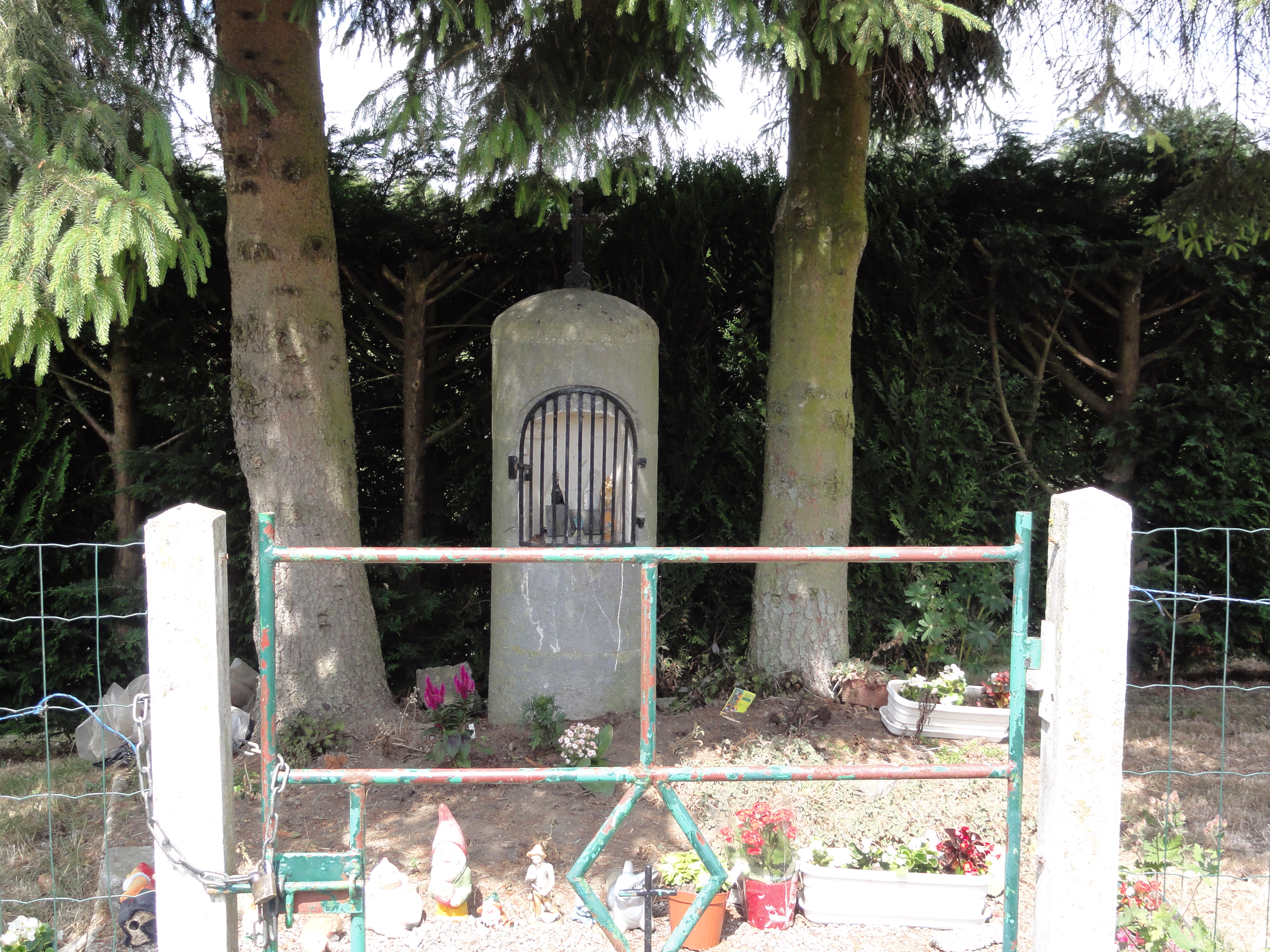
Decorated Chapel.

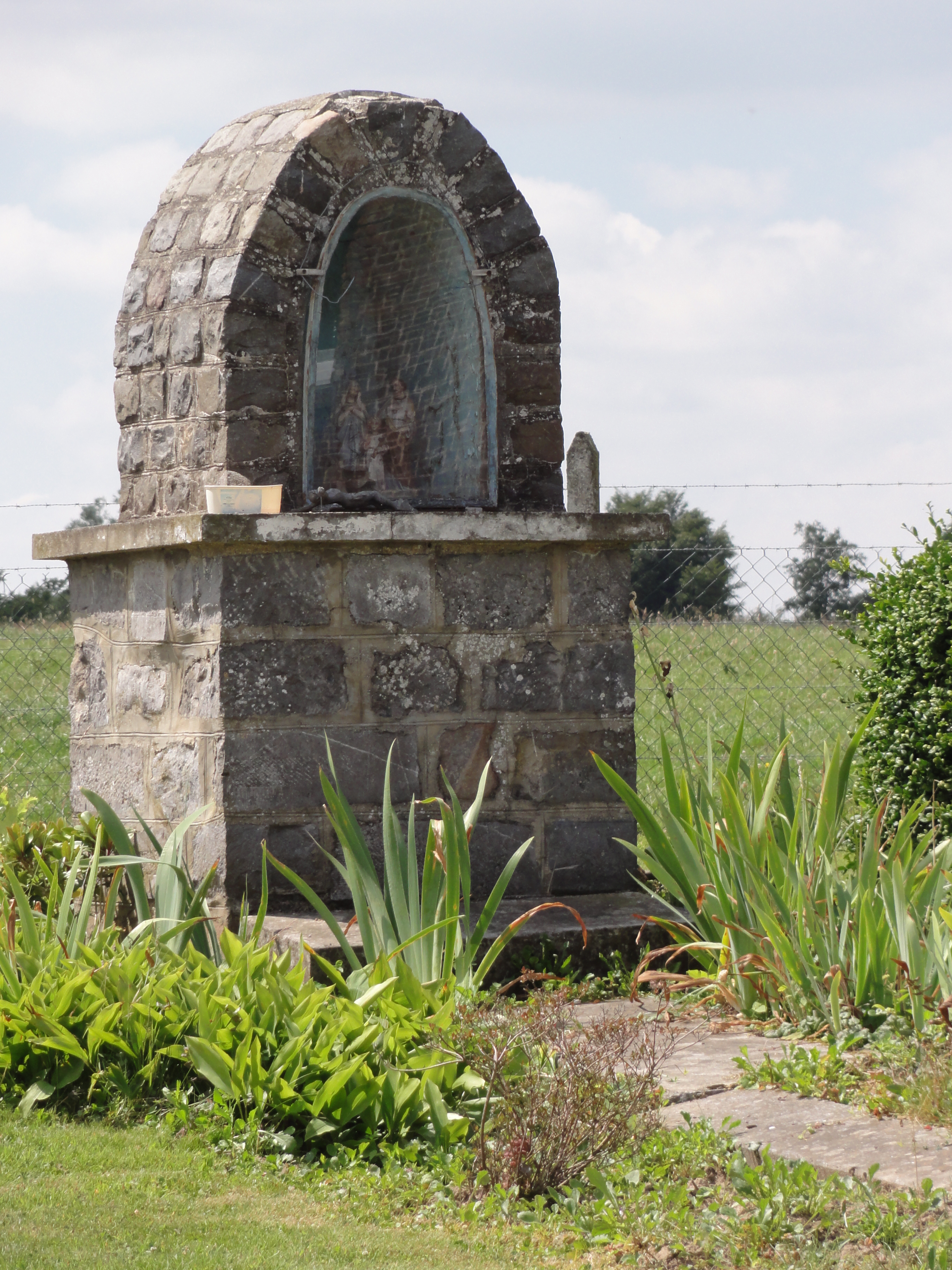
Chapel at the hamlet of Mon Idée.

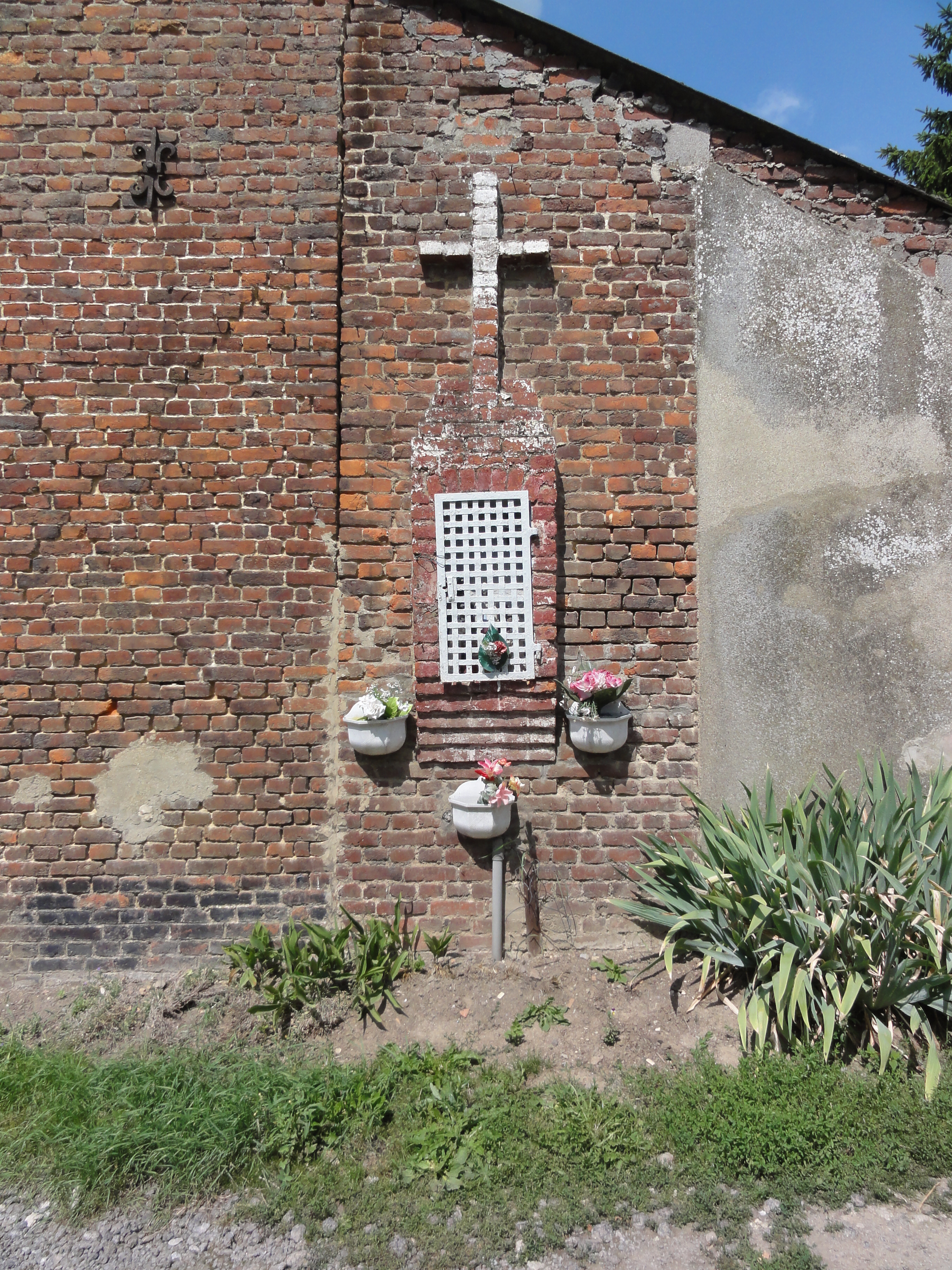
Niche chapel at Pas-de-Vache.

== See also ==
- Communes of the Aisne department
