= Sambre =

River in France and Belgium

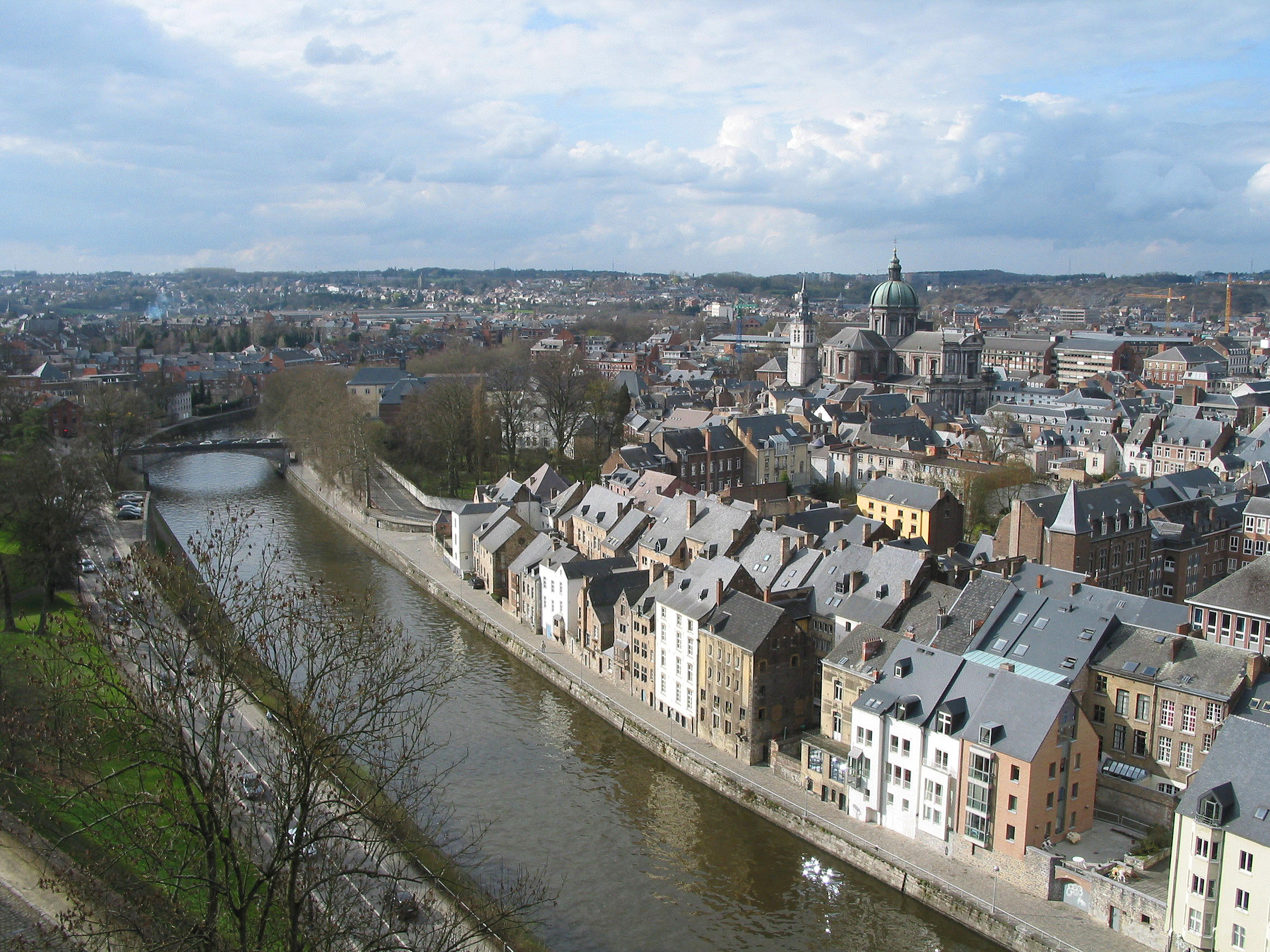
- The Sambre in the centre of Namur

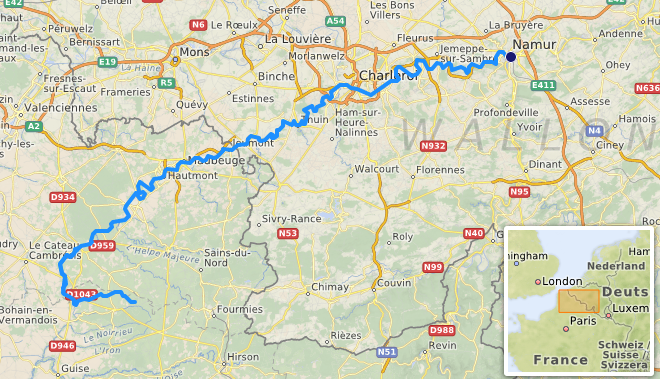

Location
- Countries: Belgium and France

Physical characteristics
- Source
  - location: Picardy
  - elevation: 199 m (653 ft)
- Mouth
  - location: Meuse at Namur
  - coordinates: 50°27′43″N 4°52′15″E
- Length: 193 km (120 mi)
- Basin size: 2,740 square kilometres (1,060 mi^{2})

Basin features
- Progression: Meuse→ North Sea

The Sambre (French: [sɑ̃bʁ]; Walloon: Sambe; Dutch: Samber ) is a river in northern France and in Wallonia, Belgium. It is a left-bank tributary of the Meuse, which it joins in the Wallonian capital Namur.

The source of the Sambre is near Le Nouvion-en-Thiérache, in the Aisne department. It passes through the Franco-Belgian coal basin, formerly an important industrial district. The navigable course begins in Landrecies at the junction with the Canal de la Sambre à l'Oise, which links with the central French waterway network (or did, until navigation was interrupted in 2006 following structural failures). It runs 54 km and 9 locks 38.50 m long and 5.20 m wide down to the Belgian border at Jeumont. From the border the river is canalised in two distinct sections over a distance of 88 km with 17 locks. The Haute-Sambre is 39 km long and includes 10 locks of the same dimensions as in France, down to the industrial town of Charleroi. The rest of the Belgian Sambre was upgraded to European Class IV dimensions (1350-tonne barges) in the immediate post-World War II period. It lies at the western end of the sillon industriel, which is still Wallonia's industrial backbone, despite the cessation of all the coal-mining and a decline in the steel industry. The river flows into the Meuse at Namur, Belgium.

The navigable waterway is managed in France by Voies Navigables de France and in Belgium by the Service Public Wallon - Direction générale opérationnelle de la Mobilité et des Voies hydrauliques (Operational Directorate of Mobility and Inland Waterways)

== Course ==
The Sambre flows through the following departments of France, provinces of Belgium and towns:

- Aisne (F): Barzy-en-Thiérache
- Nord (F): Landrecies, Aulnoye-Aymeries, Hautmont, Maubeuge
- Hainaut (B): Thuin, Montigny-le-Tilleul, Charleroi
- Namur (B): Floreffe, Namur
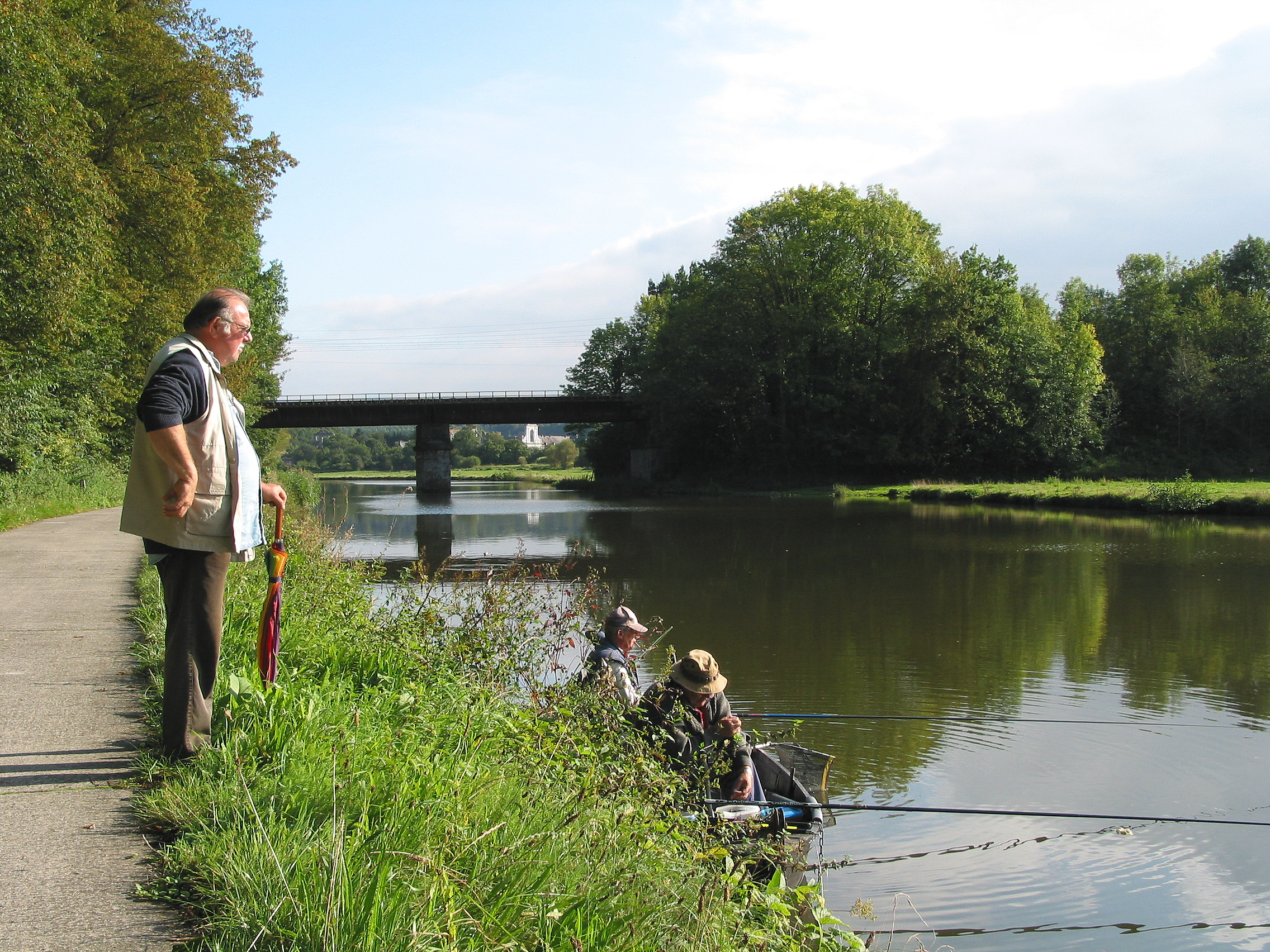
The Sambre at Aulne Abbey in Belgium

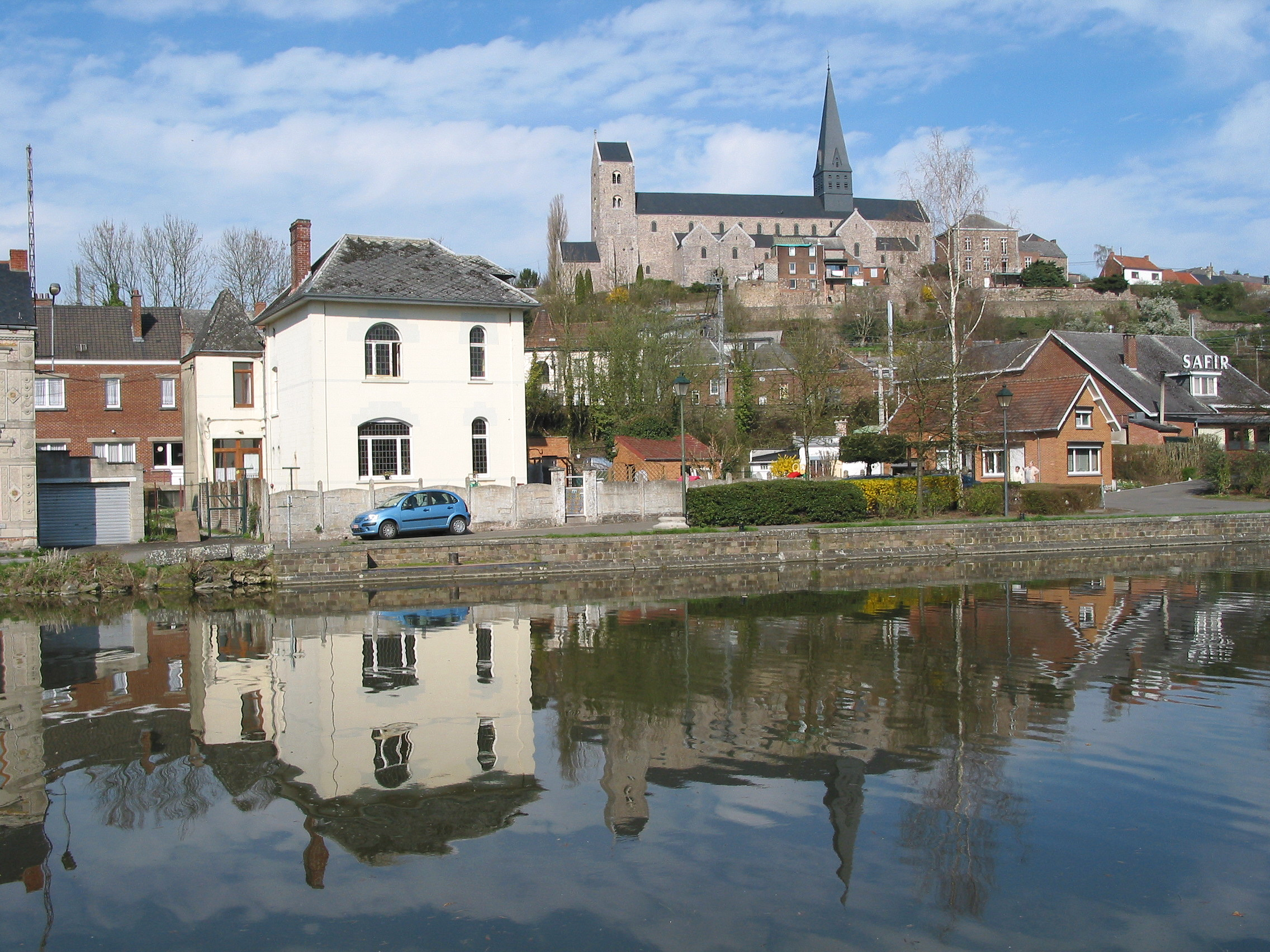
The Sambre in Lobbes, with a view on the Collegiate Church of Saint Ursmer

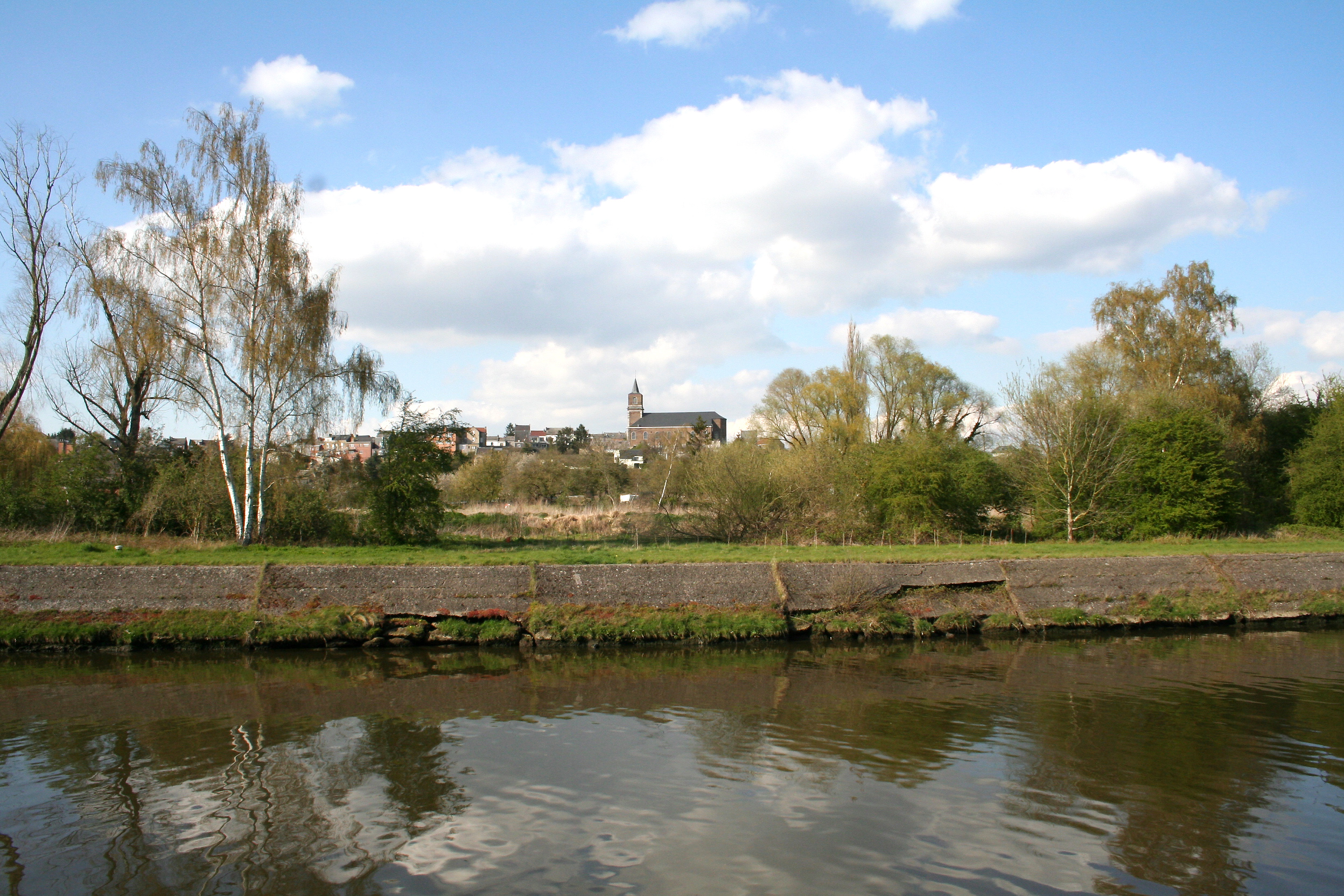
The Sambre at Flawinne (Namur)

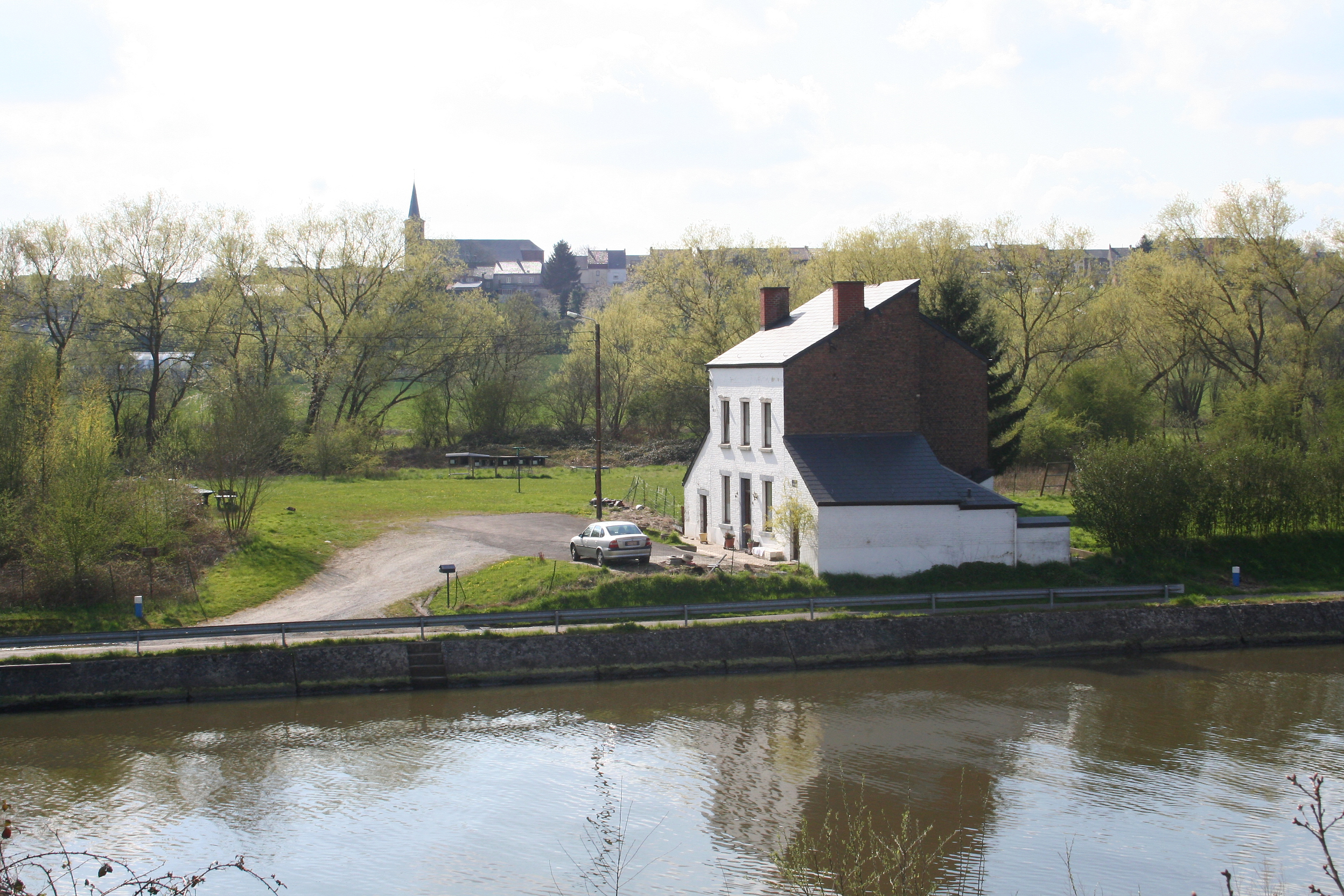
The Sambre at Ham-sur-Sambre

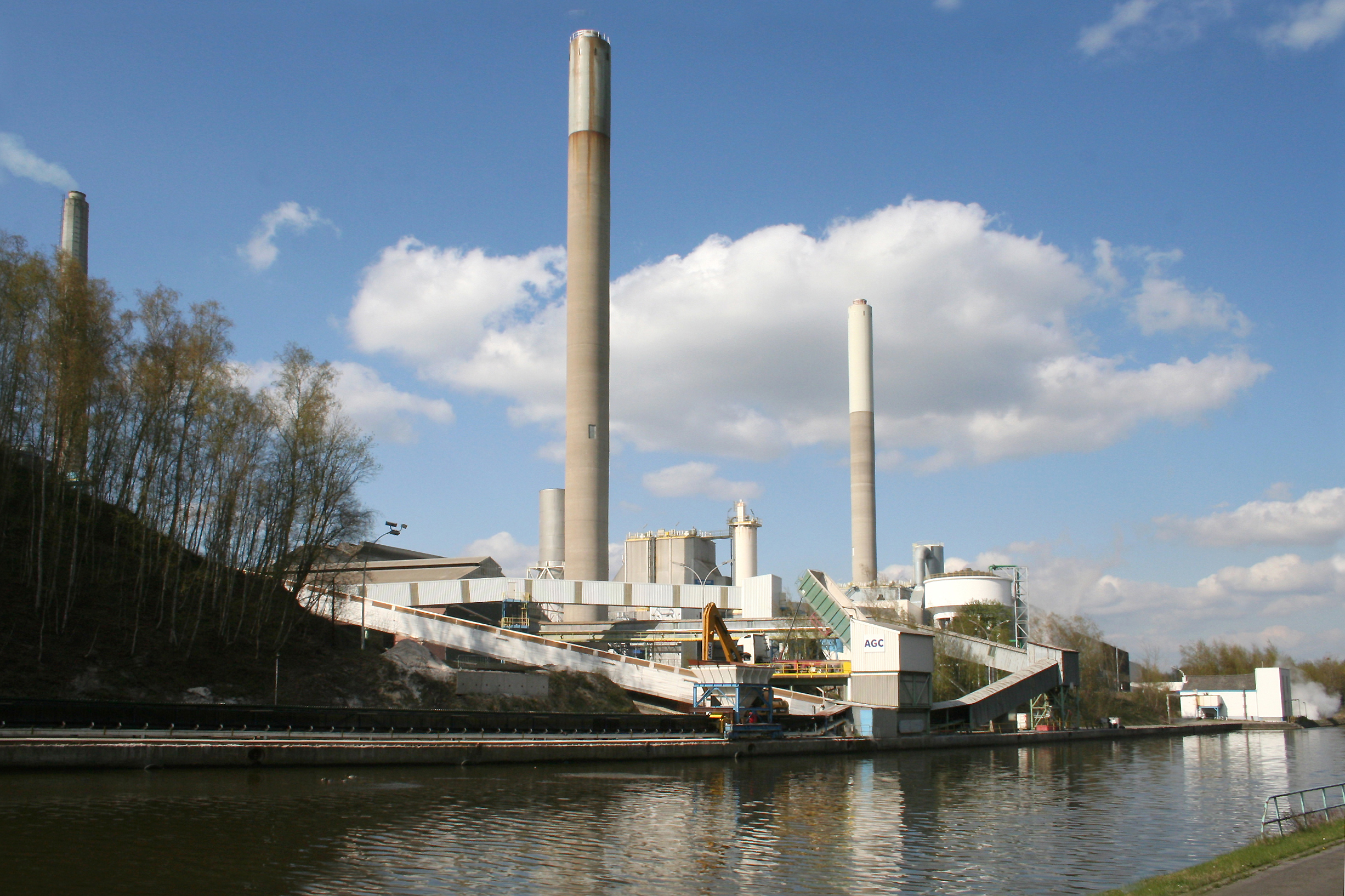
The Sambre at Moustier-sur-Sambre

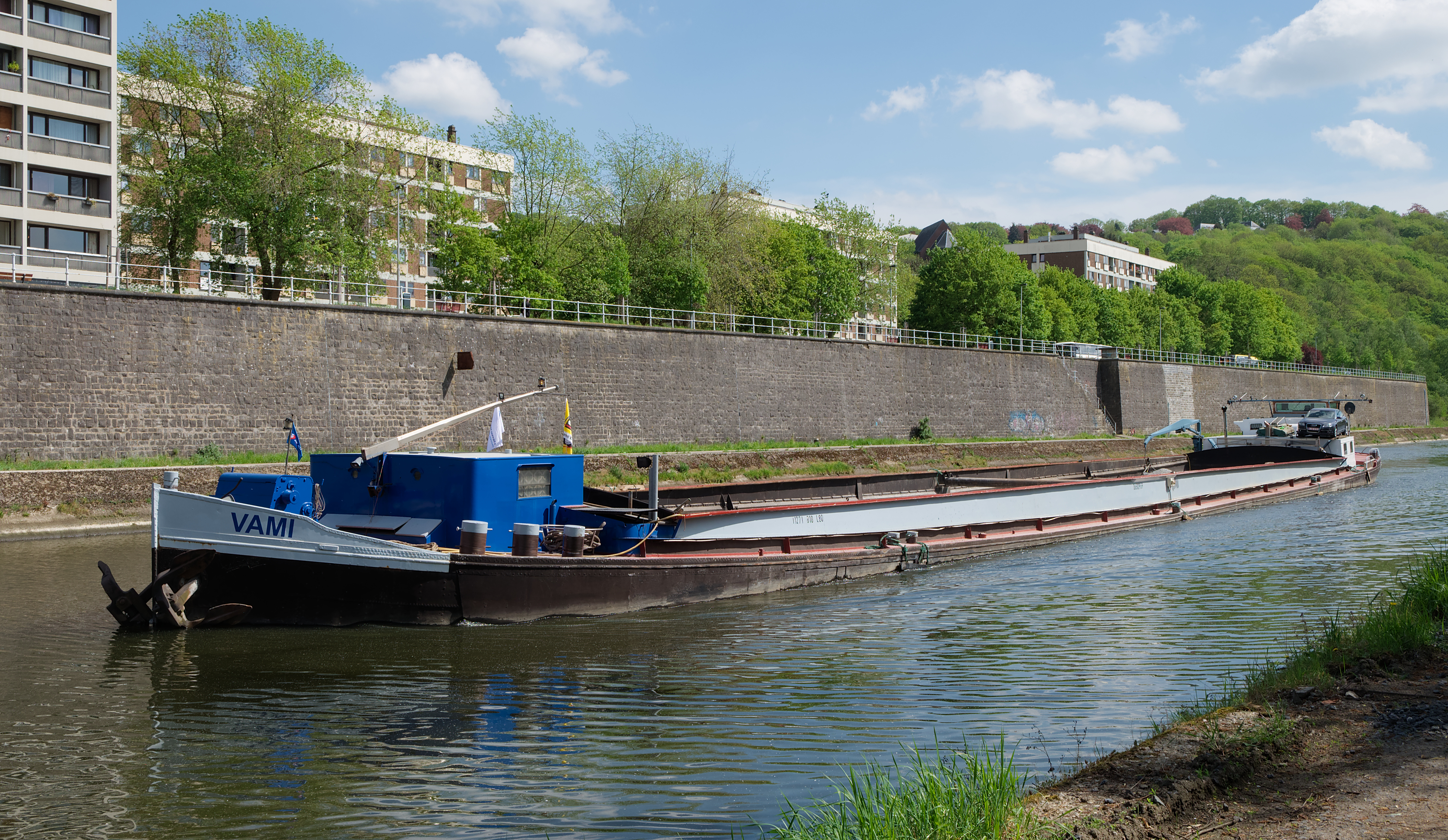
A barge on the Sambre in Namur

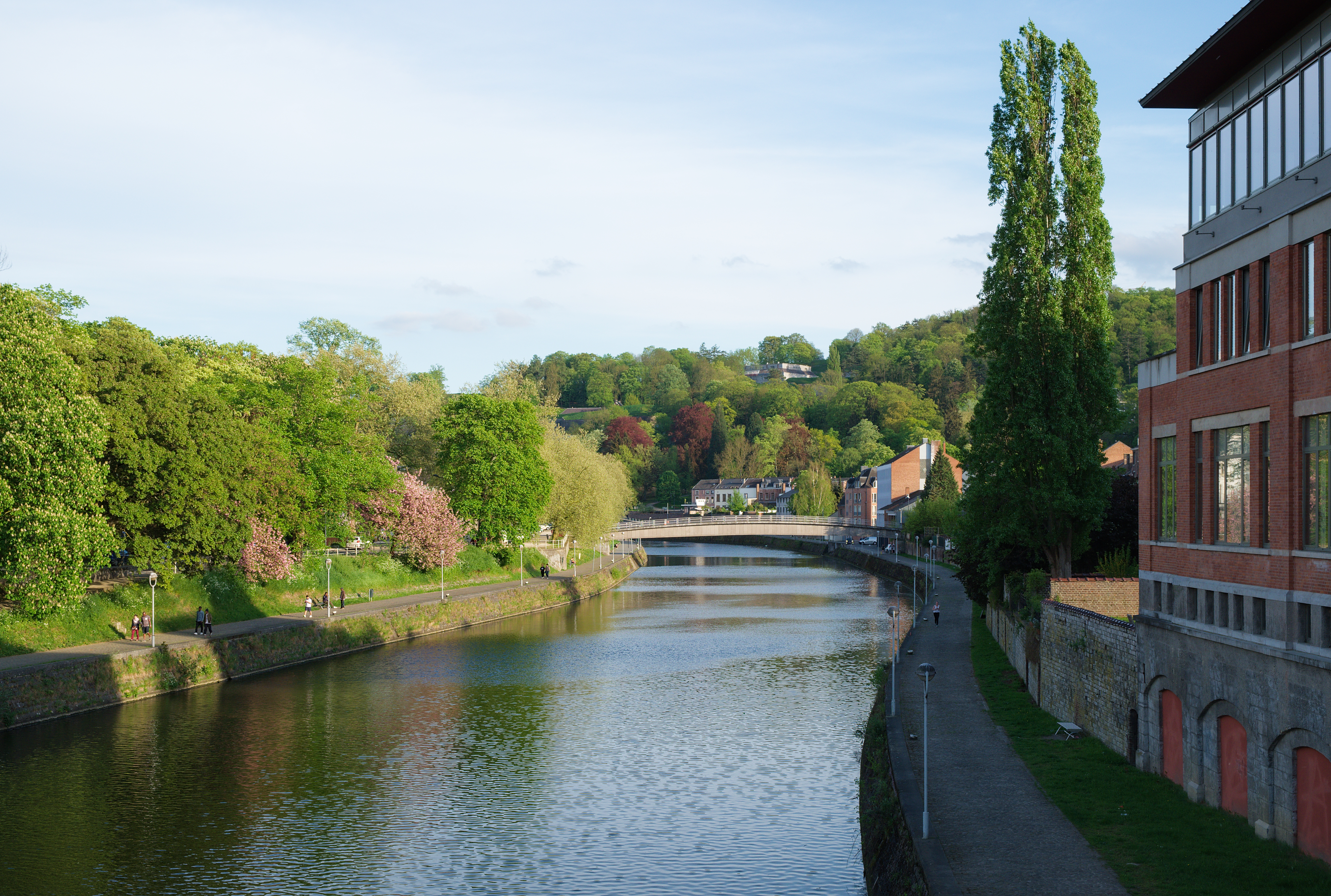
The Sambre in Namur

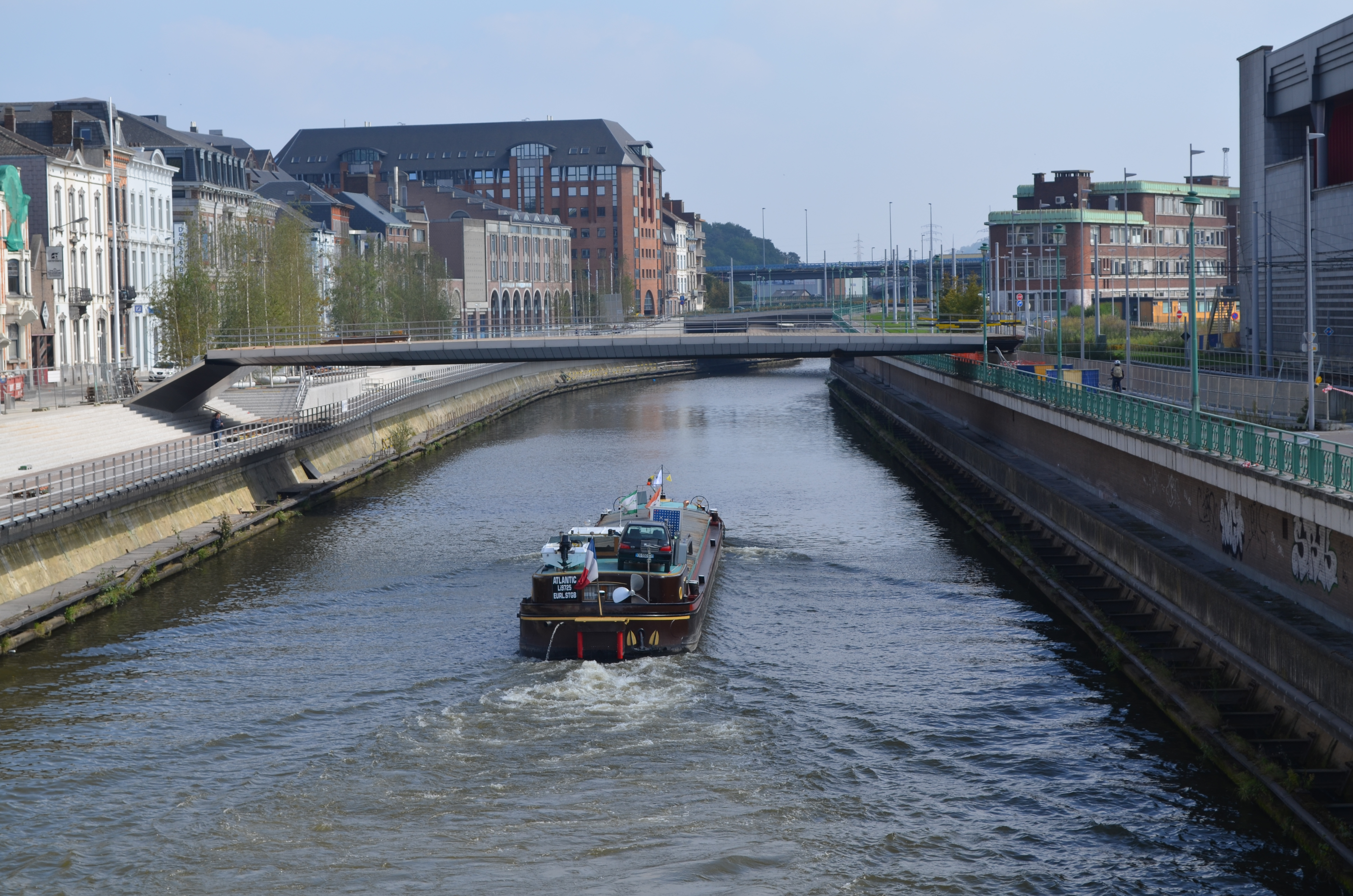
The canalised Sambre running through the centre of Charleroi

== Main tributaries ==
- Helpe Mineure
- Helpe Majeure
- Eau d’Heure (Eau d'Heure lakes)
- Hantes
- Thure
- Biesmelle
- Thyria
- Eau d’Yves
- Piéton, northern tributary, confluence in Charleroi.
- Hanzinne, confluence in Châtelet
- Biesmes d’Aiseau
- Orneau
- Ligne
- Eau d’Eppe
- Ruisseau de Fosses
- Solre

== Events ==
- On 24 February 1912, Regina Magritte, the mother of the famous surrealist painter Réné Magritte, drowned herself in this river at Châtelet.

== Battles ==
The 19th-century theory that the Sambre was the location of Julius Caesar's battle against a Belgic confederation (57 BC), was discarded a long time ago, but is still repeated.

Three important battles were fought in Fleurus, a suburb of Charleroi on the north bank of the Sambre: the Thirty Years' War Battle of Fleurus (1622), the Nine Years' War Battle of Fleurus (1690), and the crucial 26 June 1794 Battle of Fleurus (1794), the most significant battle of the Flanders Campaign in the Low Countries during the French Revolutionary Wars. The last was fought on both banks of the river, culminating a campaign that had involved multiple crossings and re-crossings of the river.

Heavy fighting occurred along the river during World War I, especially at the siege of Namur in 1914 (Battle of Charleroi) and in the last month of the war Battle of the Sambre (1918).
