= Vireux-Molhain National Nature Reserve =

Protected area in France

- IUCN category III (natural monument or feature)
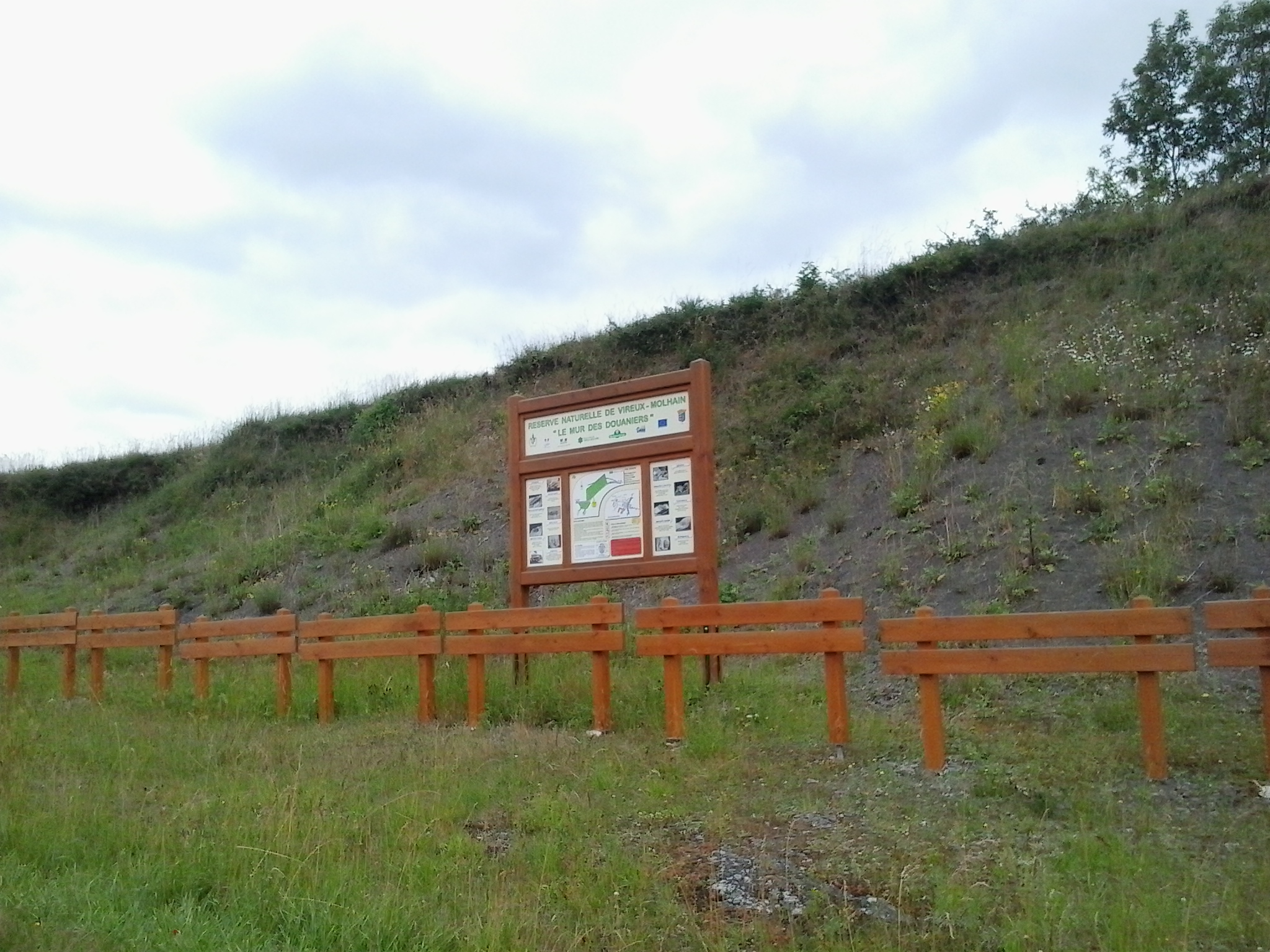
- Interactive map of Vireux-Molhain National Nature Reserve
- Location: Ardennes, France
- Nearest city: Givet
- Coordinates: 50°05′39″N 4°42′26″E
- Area: 1.82 ha (4.5 acres)
- Established: March 14, 1991
- Governing body: ONF Ardennes

The Vireux-Molhain national nature reserve (RNN104) is a national nature reserve of geological and paleontological interest. It is located in the Pointe de Givet, department of Ardennes, on the border between France and Belgium. It covers an area of 1.82 ha. The site is known as Customs Wall (Mur des Douaniers) as it is near an old customs post. This outcrop of Middle Devonian shale (Eifelian: ± 397 million years) is notable for the quantity and good state of preservation of its fossils. Trilobites are well-represented.

== History ==
The discovery of the site is attributed to geologist Jules Gosselet at the end of the 19th century. The deposit was frequently visited by paleontologists due to the profusion of fossils, the diversity of species, plus the quality of their preservation. It was subjected to intensive extraction by amateurs and professionals.

The nature reserve was created in 1991 to regulate uncontrolled exploitation of the site and to allow conservation and study of fossils. Initially entrusted to the Ardennes Natural History Society. In 1996 responsibility moved to the National Forests Office. It is accessible to everyone, with a strict ban on extracting and collecting fossils and minerals. Today, the main threats are intrusion of shrub vegetation and water infiltration as shale is very brittle.

== Fossil collections ==
These protection measures have been seen as controversial: banning collecting prevents new scientific study, despite the site's potential. Natural erosion will ultimately destroy outcropping fossils, which could be exploited without degrading the site. Few studies are funded and this "set-aside" deprives the scientific community of discoveries and collection of information that competent amateur paleontologists could make.

Part of the collections are kept at the Bogny-sur-meuse Museum of fossils and minerals (Musée des fossiles et minéraux de Bogny-Sur-Meuse) with the help of the Mineralogical and Paleontological Association of Bogny-sur-Meuse (Association Minéralogique et Paléontologique de Bogny-Sur-Meuse) who have assembled the collections allowing researchers to study these fossils today.

Despite the large quantity of fossils extracted from the site, knowledge of the fauna of middle Devonian remains incomplete. Many species are not yet listed or have been incorrectly named. Most has not yet been the subject of in-depth scientific study. Scientists exploit museum and other collections to better understand this fauna and more particularly the trilobites.

== Geography ==
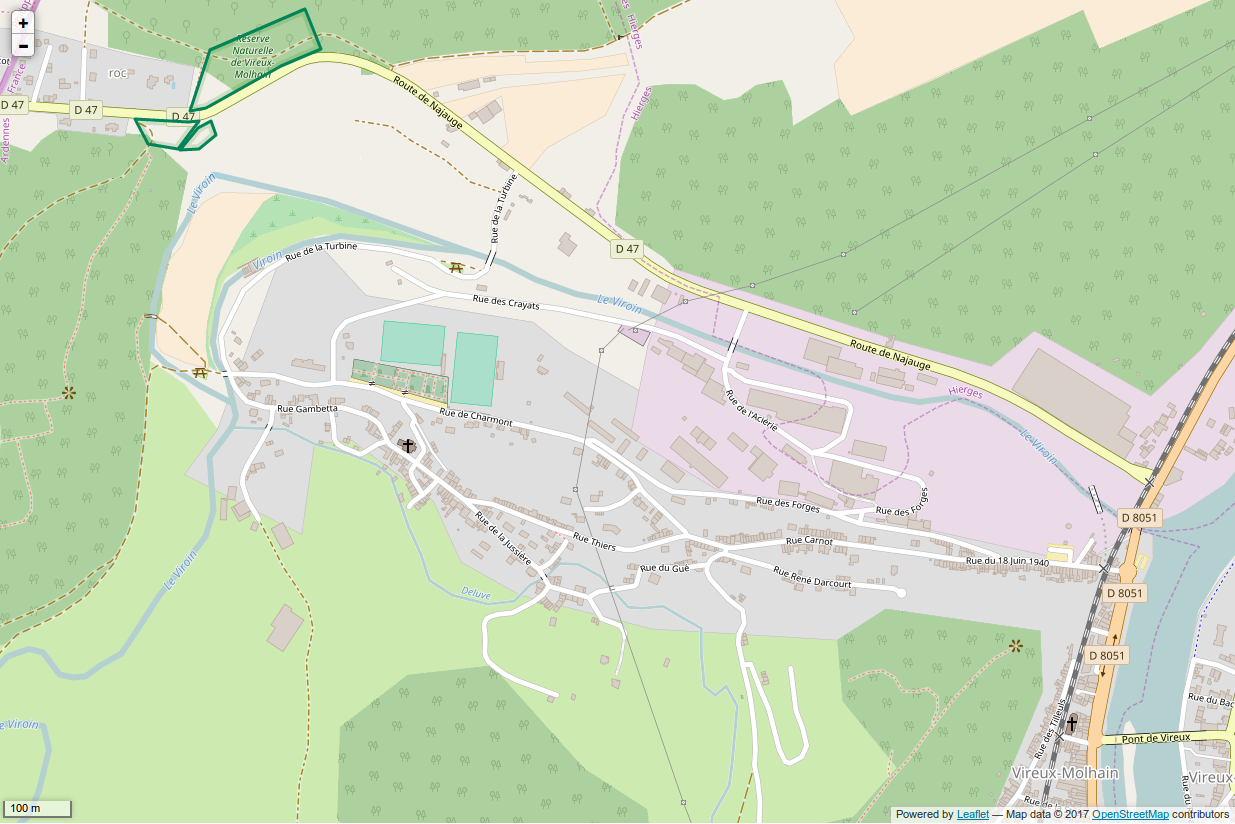
Perimeter of the Vireux-Molhain National Nature Preserve

The reserve is located in Vireux-Molhain in the Ardennes (Pointe de Givet), on the northern slope of the Viroin valley, a few kilometers from its junction with the Meuse, in the Calestienne narrow limestone strip. It marks the transition from the Ardennes to the Fagne and the Famenne. It is accessed by an embankment on the edge of “Najauge road” between Vireux-Molhain and Treignes (departmental road 47 between Vireux-Molhain and Couvin). Collection of fossils and minerals is prohibited there.

== Geology ==
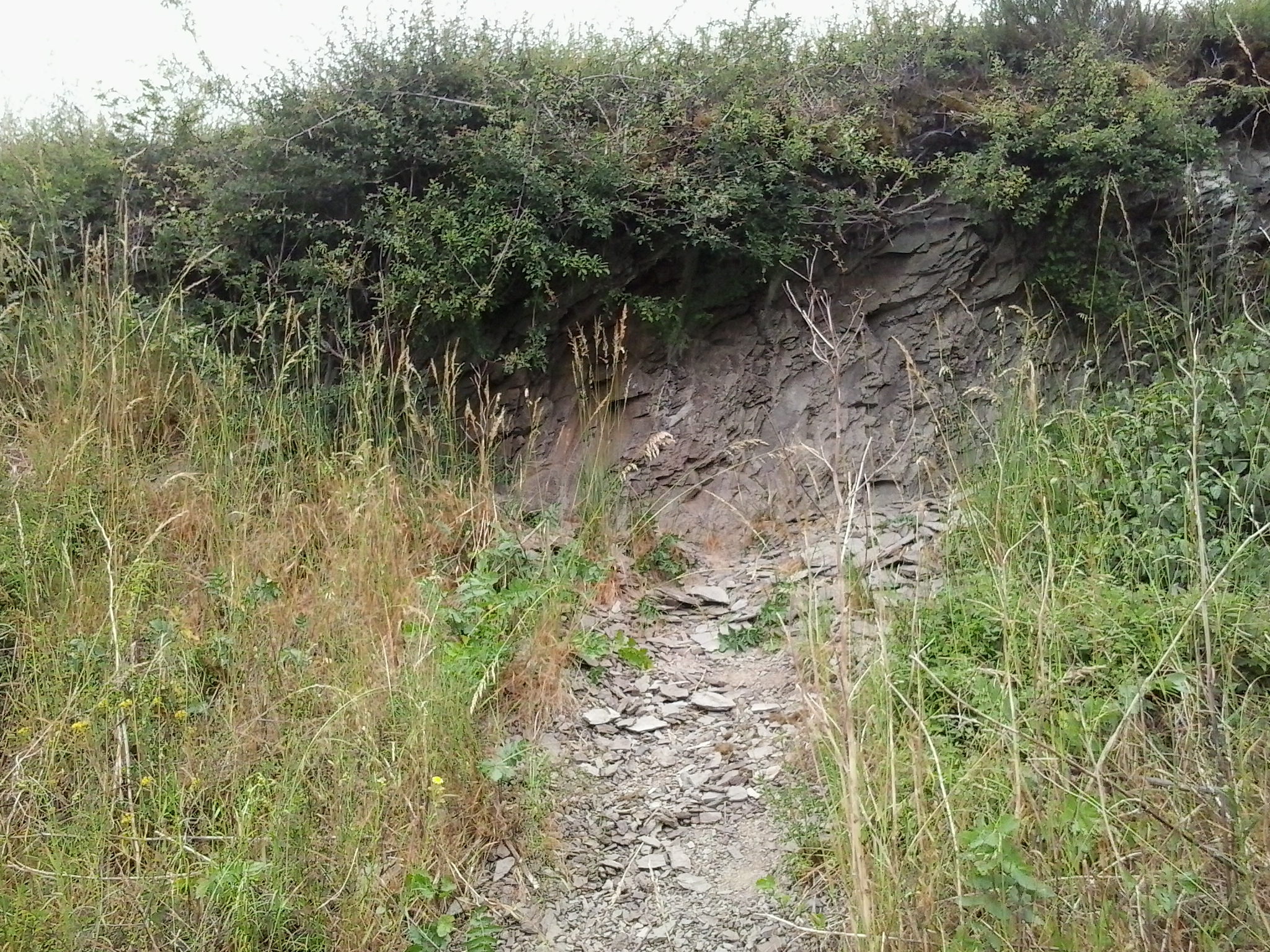
Outcropping shale.

Customs Wall (Mur des Douaniers) is an outcrop of rocks, formation of which began in Lower Eifelian, a period of Middle Devonian (Primary or Paleozoic era). These sediments formed 397 million years ago. The sedimentary layers were subsequently folded and subjected to temperature and pressure constraints during the orogeny of the Ardennes massif (Hercynian cycle). In more modern times, the Meuse and its tributaries have dug deep valleys in the plateau, revealing this outcrop of shales.

Until the beginning of the century, the layers of Customs Wall were considered to belong to Assise de Bure and date from Lower Couvinian (Emsian). The revision of the geological map of Givet and recent studies have shown that they belong to the Jemelle formation (Member of the Vieux Moulin) of Lower Eifelian.

=== Fossil fauna ===
During Lower Eifelian, about 393 million years ago, the region was submerged by a shallow sea. Life developed there in calm and warm waters. Corpses of dead animals were covered with sediment, initiating fossilization. The most abundant fossils are trilobites, but along with reef organisms and cnidarians.

Identified trilobites (classified by orders):

- Proetida
  - Family Proetidae
    - Gerastos catervus (van Viersen, 2006) (previous names: Rhenocynproetus catervus, Gerastos cuvieri (Steininger, 1831))
    - Diademaproetux cf. pertinax van Viersen, Taghon & Magrean, 2019
  - Family Aulacopleuridae
    - Cyphaspis cf. iuxta van Viersen, Taghon & Magrean, 2019
- Phacopida
  - Family Acastidae
    - Asteropyge eonia van Viersen, Taghon & Magrean, 2019
  - Family Phacopidae
    - Pedinopariops ceuthonymus van Viersen, Taghon & Magrean, 2019
    - Geesops sparsinodosus gallicus (Struve, 1982). It is the most common species on the site. It has often been confused with Phacops latifrons.
- Odontopleurida
  - Family Odontopleuridae
    - Kettneraspis eftychia van Viersen, Taghon & Magrean, 2019
    - Koneprusia sp. A (sensu van Viersen, 2008)
- Lichida
  - Family Lichidae
    - Ceratarges cognatus van Viersen, 2006
- Corynexochida
  - Family Scutelluidae
    - Septimopeltis magnispina (Maillieux, 1938) (previous name: Thysanopeltella magnispina)
    - Septimopeltis cf. akatastasia van Viersen, Taghon & Magrean, 2019
    - Scabriscutellum sp.

== Administration, Management plan, regulations ==
The reserve is managed by the Ardennes National Forest Office.

=== Legal status ===
The nature reserve was created by a decree of March 14, 1991.
