= Vireux-Molhain =

- Commune
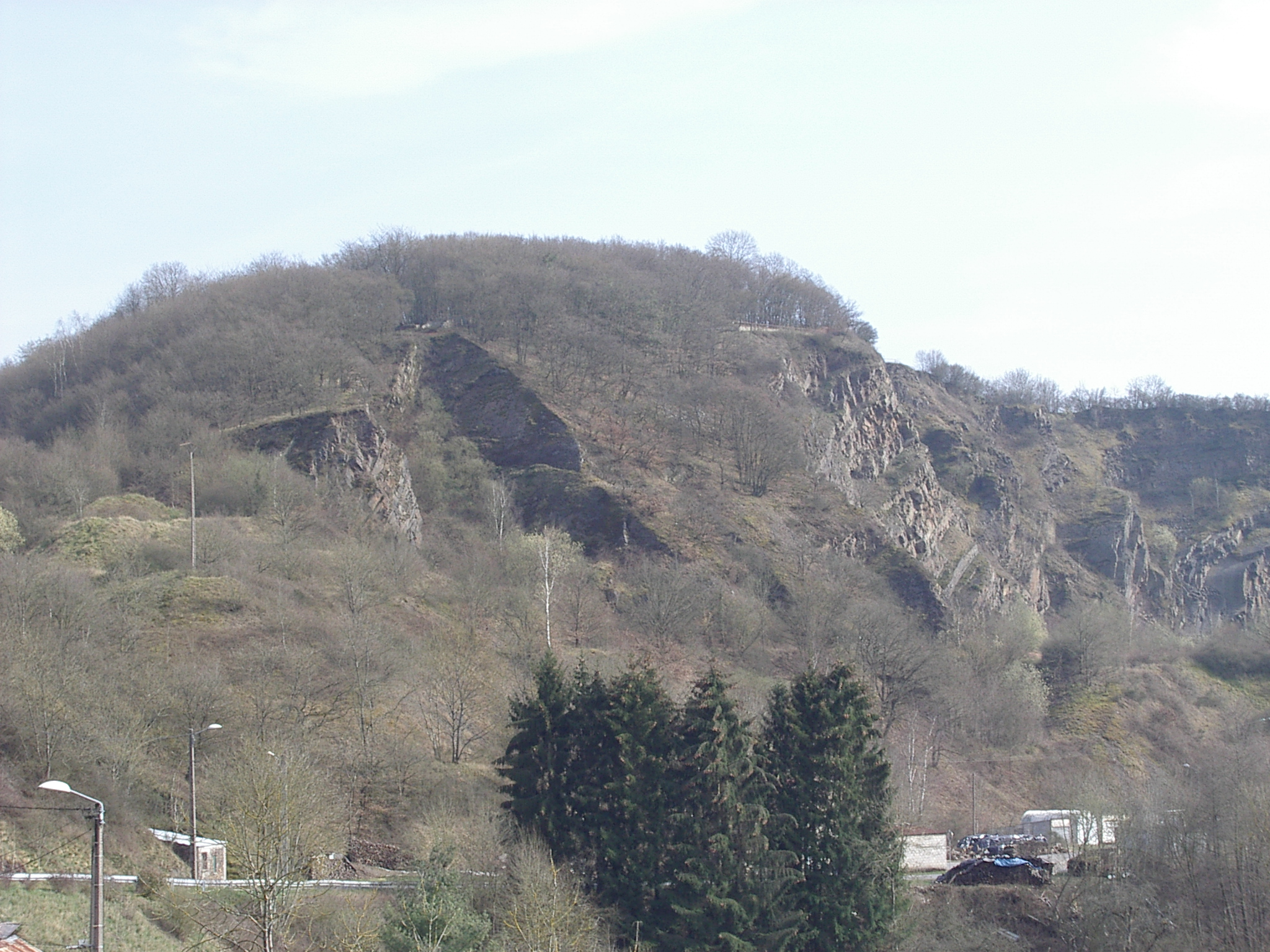
- Mont Vireux

- Coat of arms
- Location of Vireux-Molhain
- Location within France Location within Grand Est
- Coordinates: 50°05′03″N 4°43′30″E
- Country: France
- Region: Grand Est
- Department: Ardennes
- Arrondissement: Charleville-Mézières
- Canton: Givet
- Intercommunality: Ardenne Rives de Meuse

Government
  - Mayor (2020–2026): Jean-Pol Devresse
- Area^{1}: 8.29 km^{2} (3.20 sq mi)
- Elevation: 113 m (371 ft)
- Population (2023): 1,504
  - Density: 181/km^{2} (470/sq mi)
- Time zone: UTC+01:00 (CET)
  - Summer (DST): UTC+02:00 (CEST)
- INSEE/Postal code: 08486 /08320
- ^{1} French Land Register data, which excludes lakes, ponds, glaciers > 1 km^{2} (0.386 sq mi or 247 acres) and river estuaries.

Vireux-Molhain (French pronunciation: [viʁø mɔlɛ̃]) is a commune in the Ardennes department in northern France. It lies on the opposite Meuse bank from Vireux-Wallerand.

The Vireux-Molhain National Nature Reserve is located in the commune.

== Population ==
Historical population
Year	Pop.	±% p.a.
1968	1,939	—
1975	2,039	+0.72%
1982	1,936	−0.74%
1990	1,923	−0.08%
1999	1,835	−0.52%
2007	1,692	−1.01%
2012	1,619	−0.88%
2017	1,498	−1.54%
2023	1,504	+0.07%
Source: INSEE

== See also ==
- Communes of the Ardennes department
