= Vireux-Wallerand =

- Commune
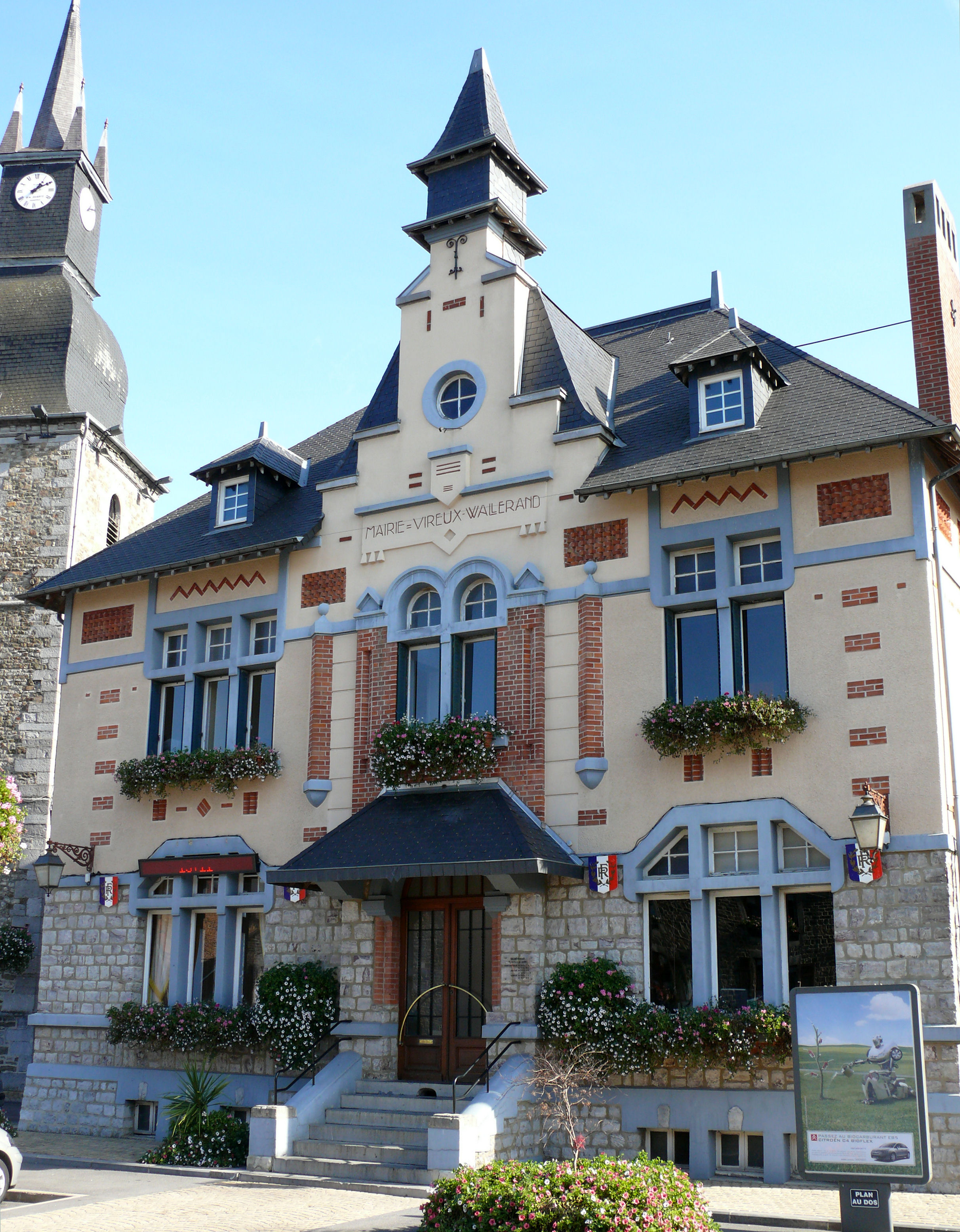
- Town hall

- Coat of arms
- Location of Vireux-Wallerand
- Location within France Location within Grand Est
- Coordinates: 50°05′04″N 4°43′51″E
- Country: France
- Region: Grand Est
- Department: Ardennes
- Arrondissement: Charleville-Mézières
- Canton: Givet
- Intercommunality: Ardenne Rives de Meuse

Government
  - Mayor (2020–2026): Bernard Dekens
- Area^{1}: 21.07 km^{2} (8.14 sq mi)
- Elevation: 108 m (354 ft)
- Highest elevation: 368 m (1,207 ft)
- Lowest elevation: 107 m (351 ft)
- Population (2023): 1,803
  - Density: 85.57/km^{2} (221.6/sq mi)
- Time zone: UTC+01:00 (CET)
  - Summer (DST): UTC+02:00 (CEST)
- INSEE/Postal code: 08487 /08320
- ^{1} French Land Register data, which excludes lakes, ponds, glaciers > 1 km^{2} (0.386 sq mi or 247 acres) and river estuaries.

Vireux-Wallerand (French pronunciation: [viʁø valʁɑ̃]) is a commune in the Ardennes department and Grand Est region of north-eastern France. It lies on the opposite Meuse bank from Vireux-Molhain.

== Population ==
Historical population
Year	Pop.	±% p.a.
1968	2,231	—
1975	2,159	−0.47%
1982	2,035	−0.84%
1990	2,020	−0.09%
1999	2,034	+0.08%
2007	1,916	−0.74%
2012	2,018	+1.04%
2017	1,962	−0.56%
2023	1,803	−1.40%
Source: INSEE

== See also ==
- Communes of the Ardennes department
