= National Forests Office (France) =

French government agency

ONF logo

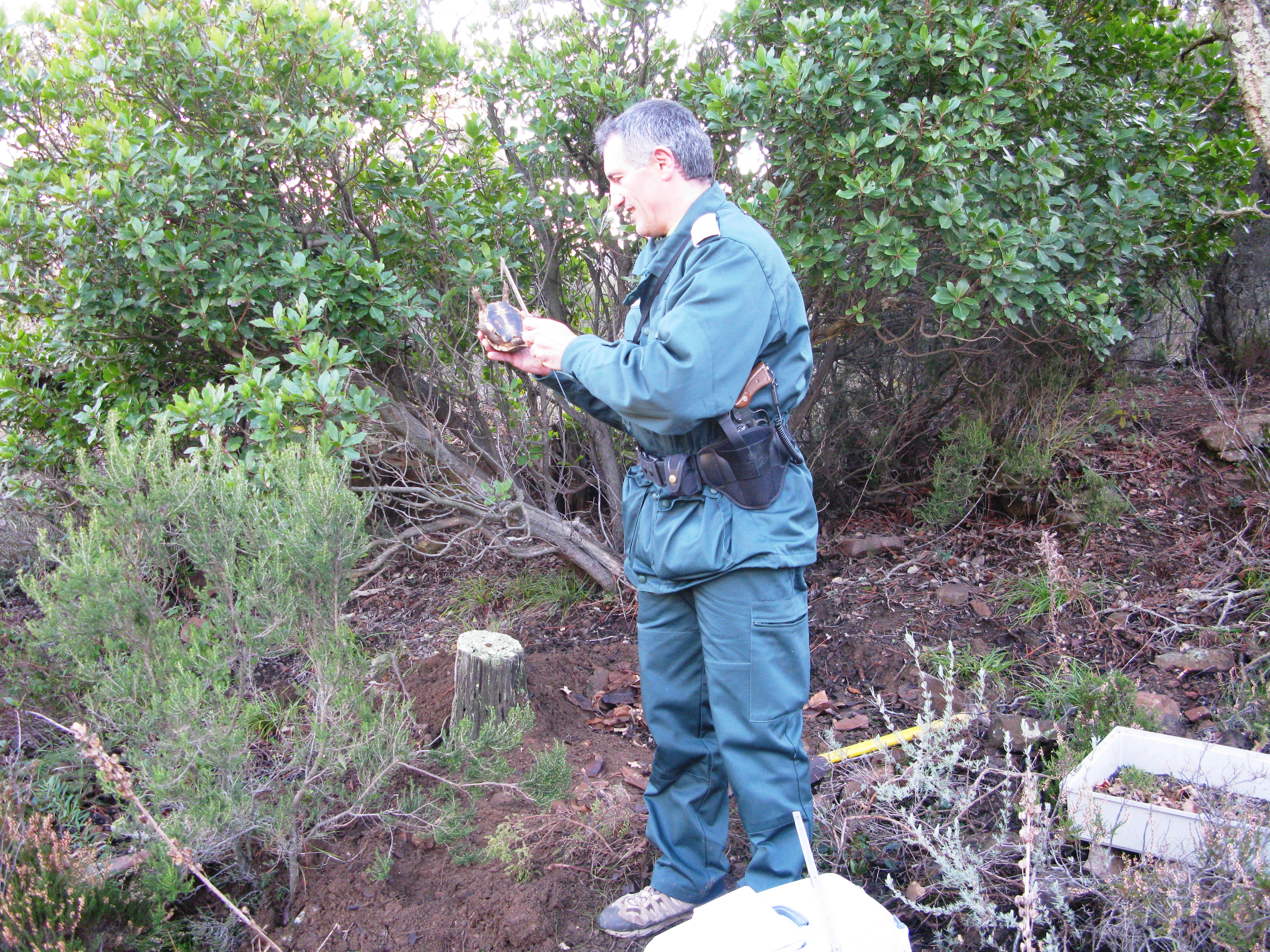
Ingénieur de l'Agriculture et de l'Environnement (Captain) of the National Forests Office measuring a seized tortoise before releasing it into nature in 2008.

The National Forests Office (French: Office national des forêts), or ONF, is a Government of France agency that manages the state forests, city forests and biological reserves. ONF is based in Paris.

The office is responsible for the sustainable management of France's approximately 10 million hectares of public forests. The ONF takes over their protection and carries out forestry policing tasks. Around 9,000 civil servants work at the ONF and its regional offices. ONF is under legislation of Ministère de l'Agriculture and Ministère de la Transition écologique et solidaire.

== History ==
ONF was founded in 1964. Since 1980, almost a third of the ONF workforce has been cut. The agency had gone through a series of structural reforms in the 2000s. Le Monde reported in 2012 that 30 forest officials took their own lives between 2002 and 2012. An internal analysis reported demotivation at the workplace, a high level of stress and a serious risk of psychosocial disorder for ONF employees.

The ONF manages 25% of French forests, totalling 11 million hectares of public forests, including 4.6 Mha in metropolitan France and 6.4 Mha in the overseas departments, mainly in French Guiana.

== Ranks and rank insignia ==
Officers

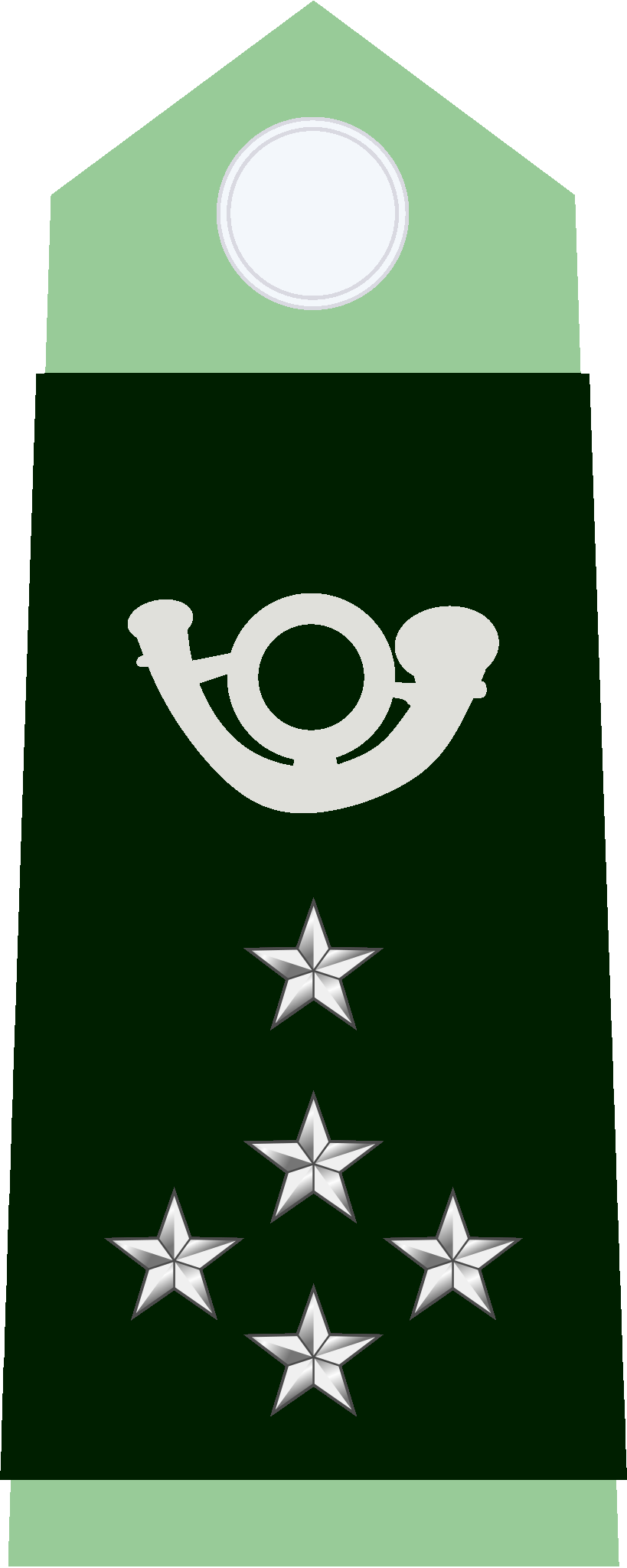
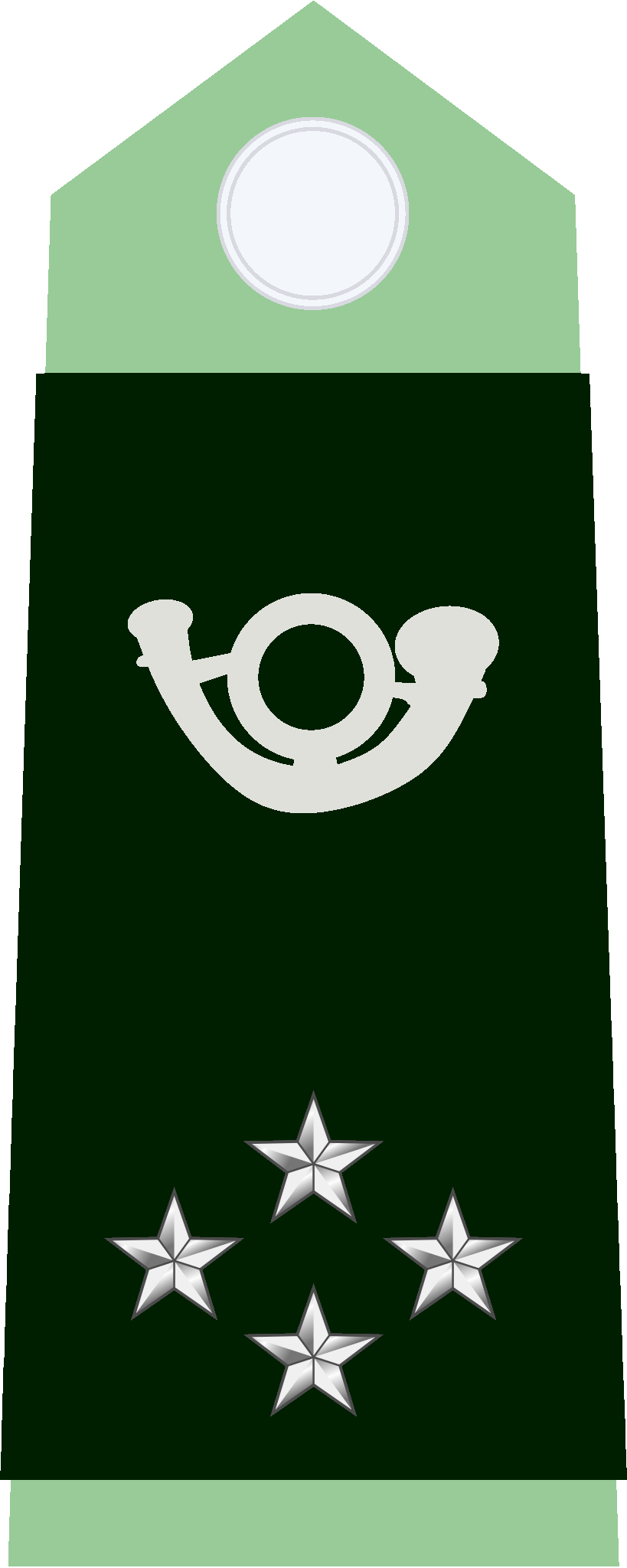
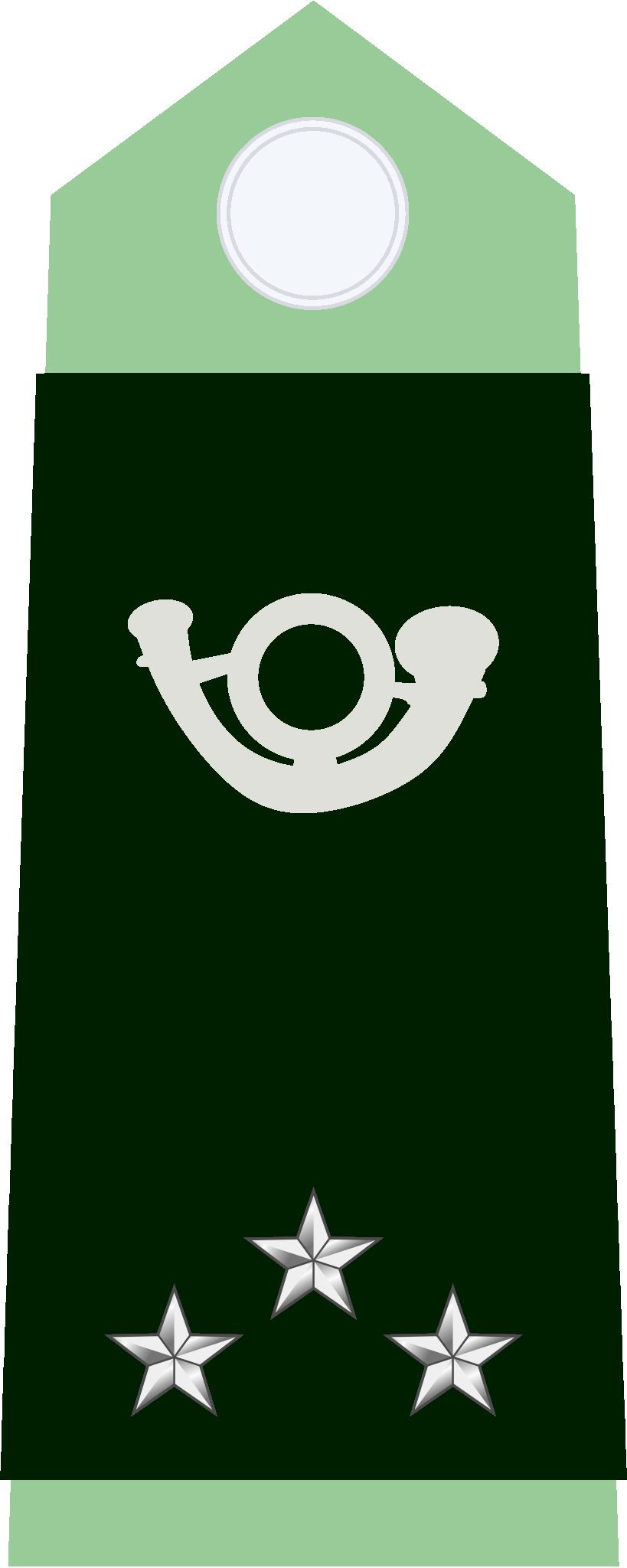
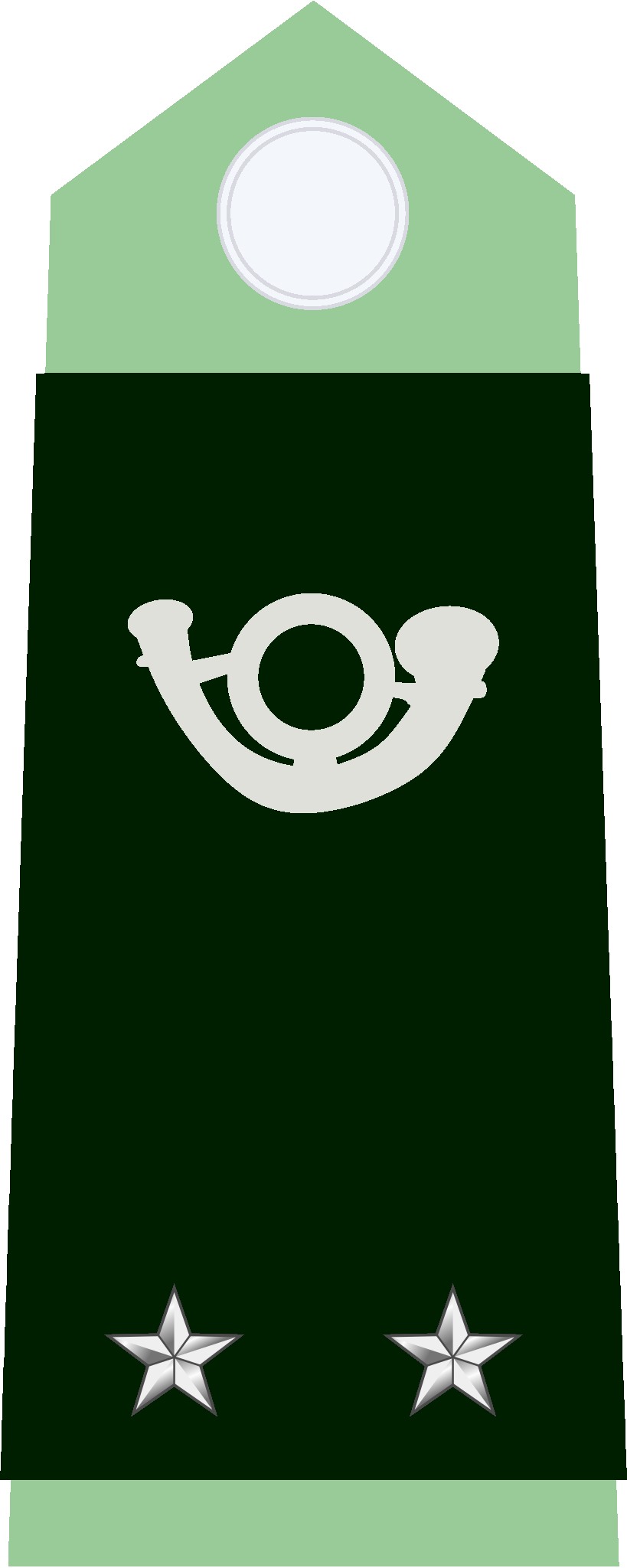
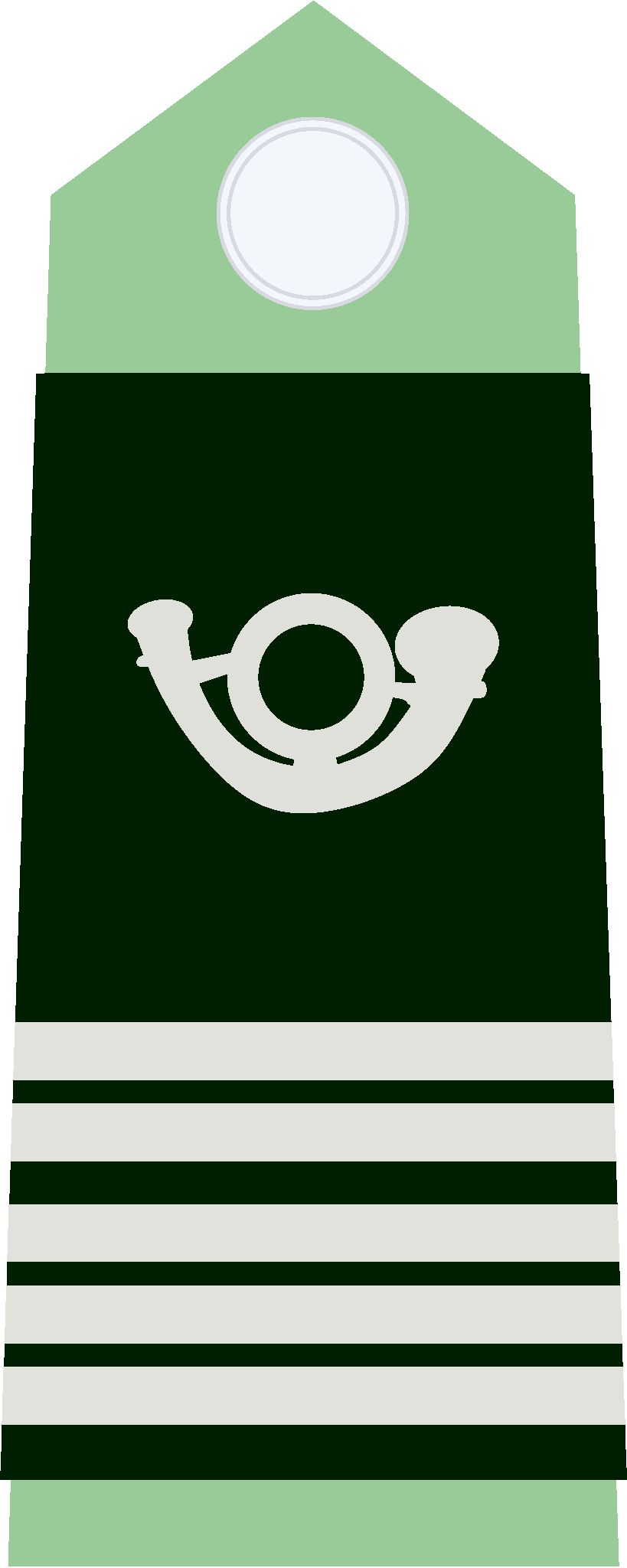
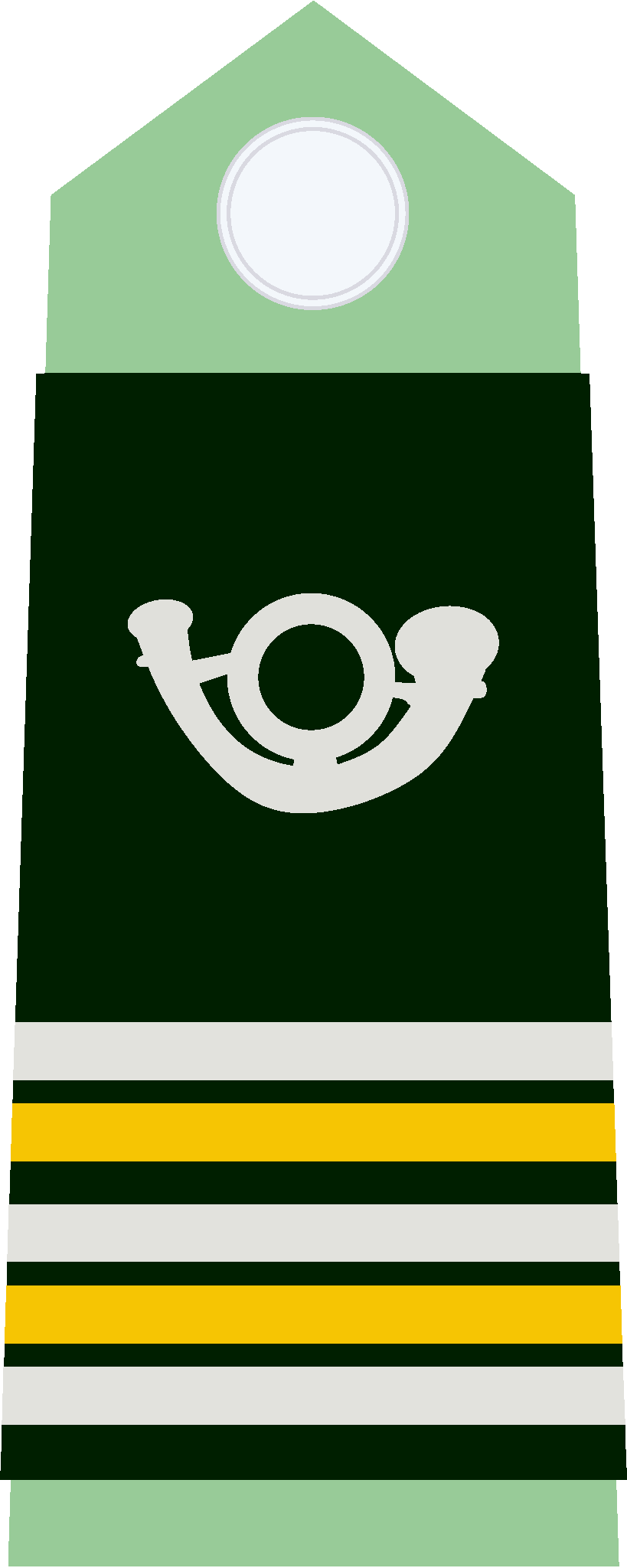
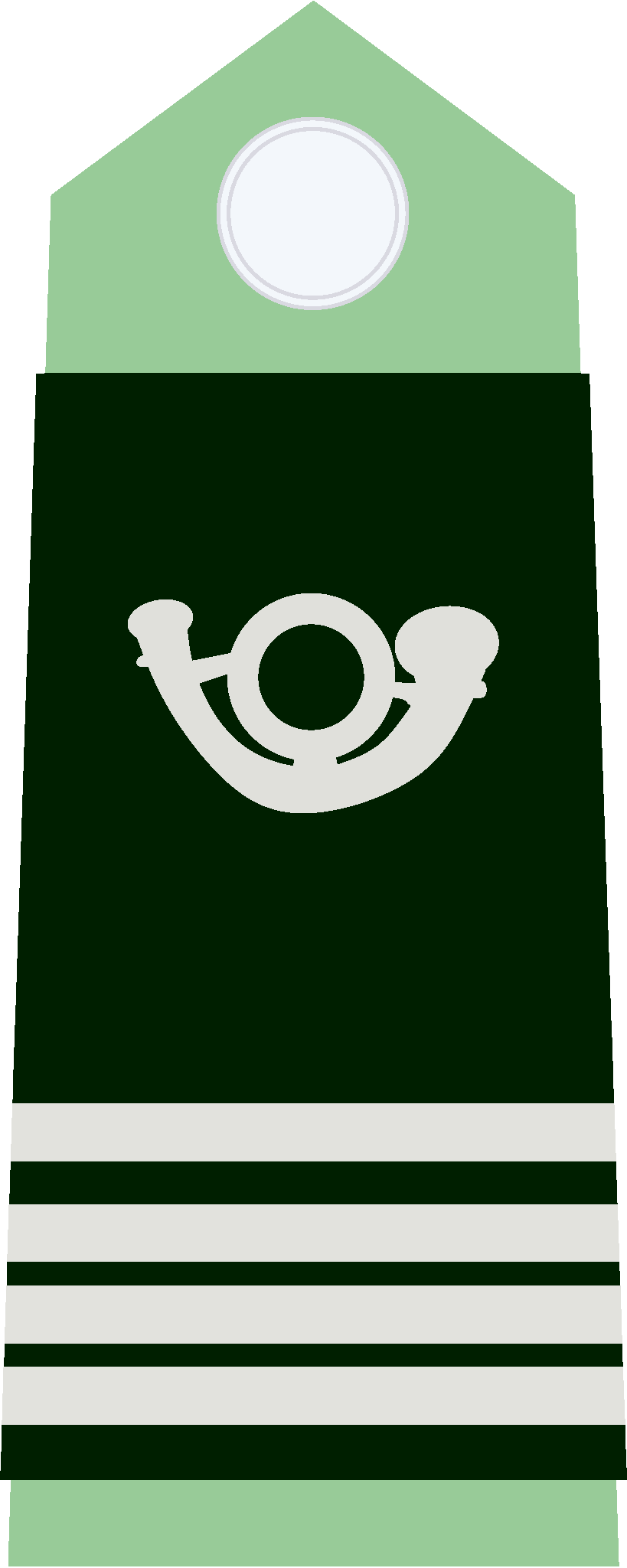
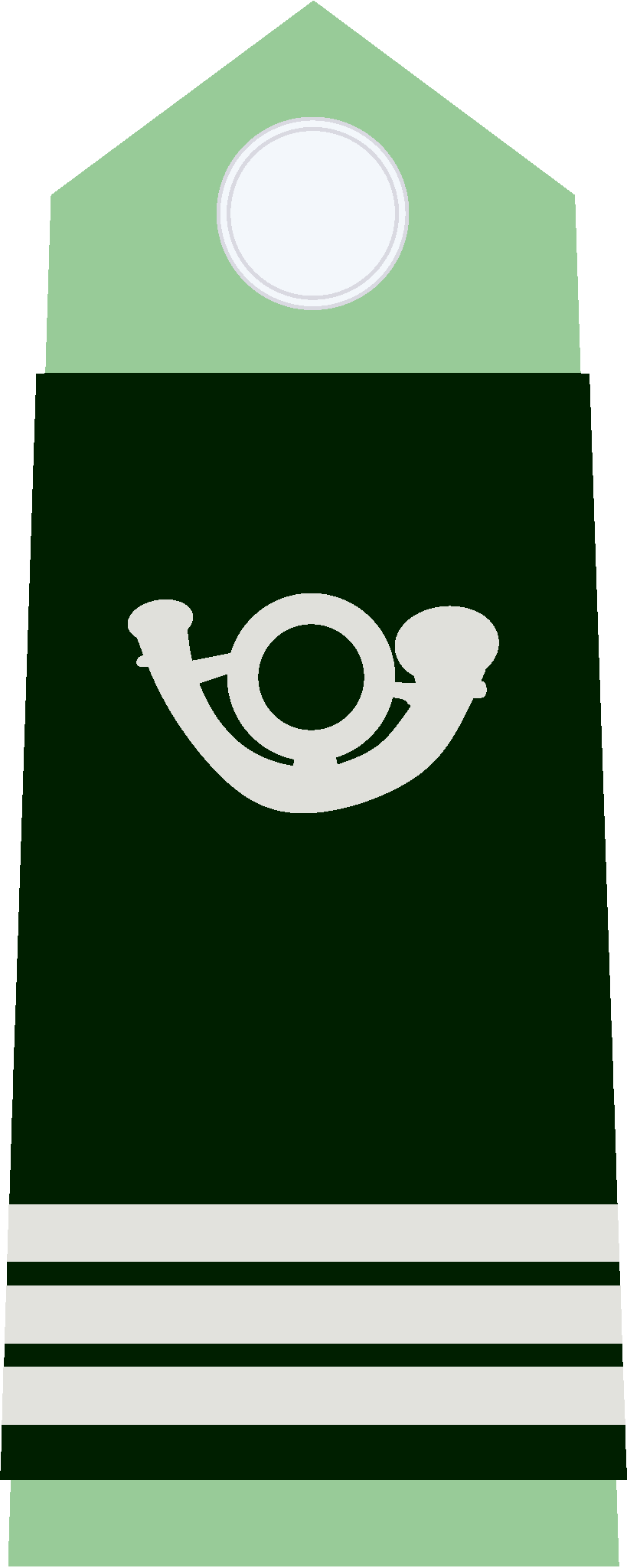
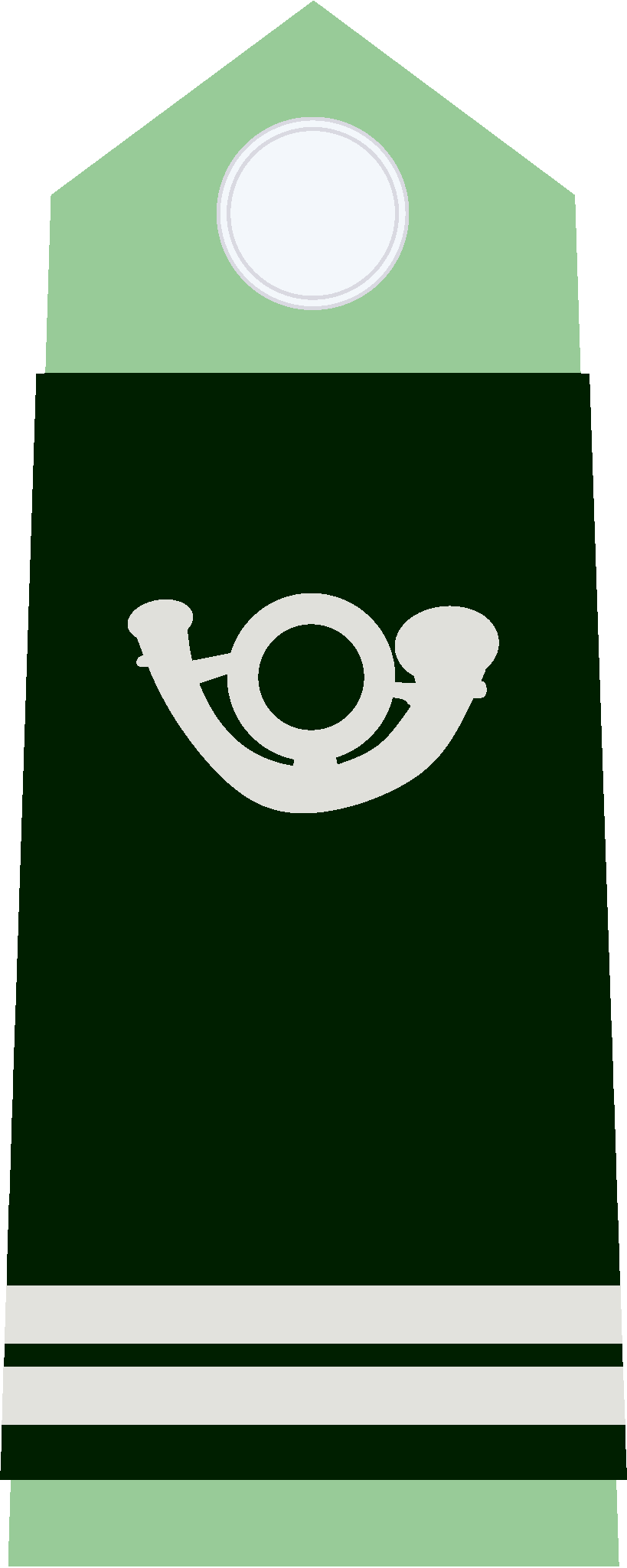
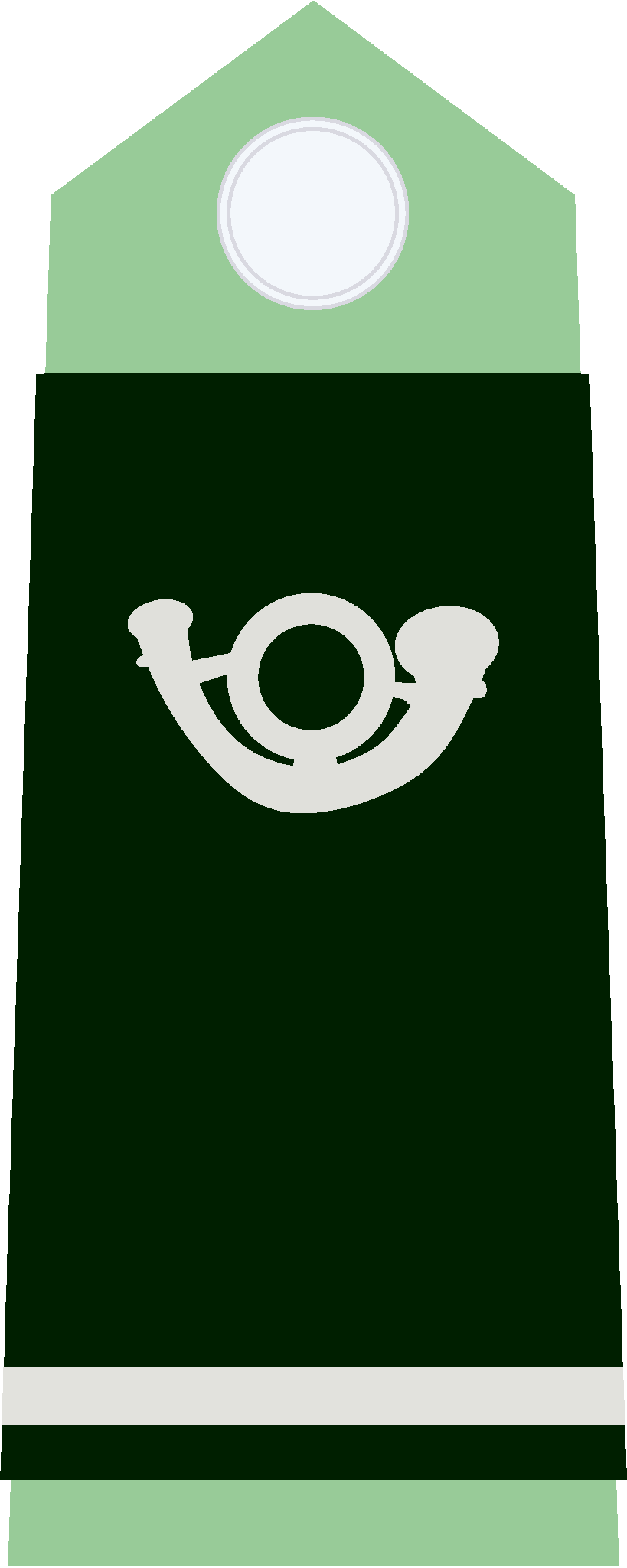
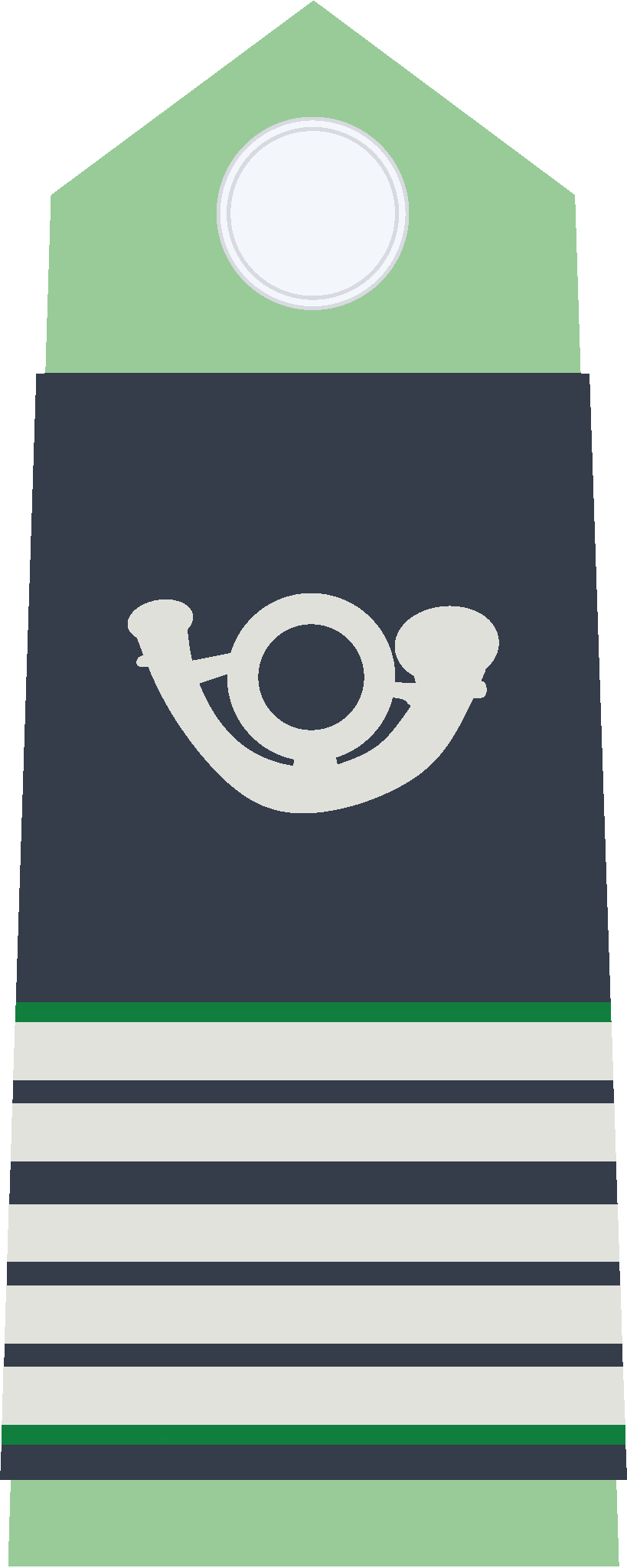
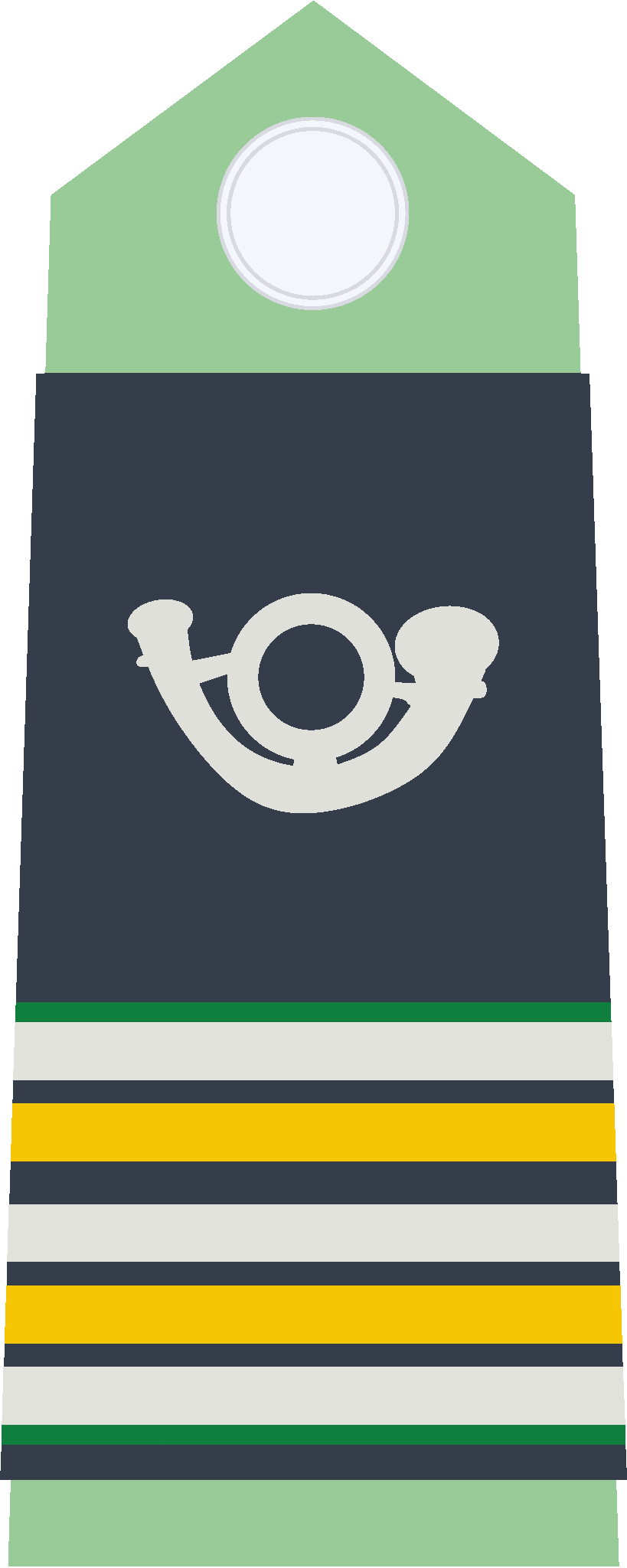
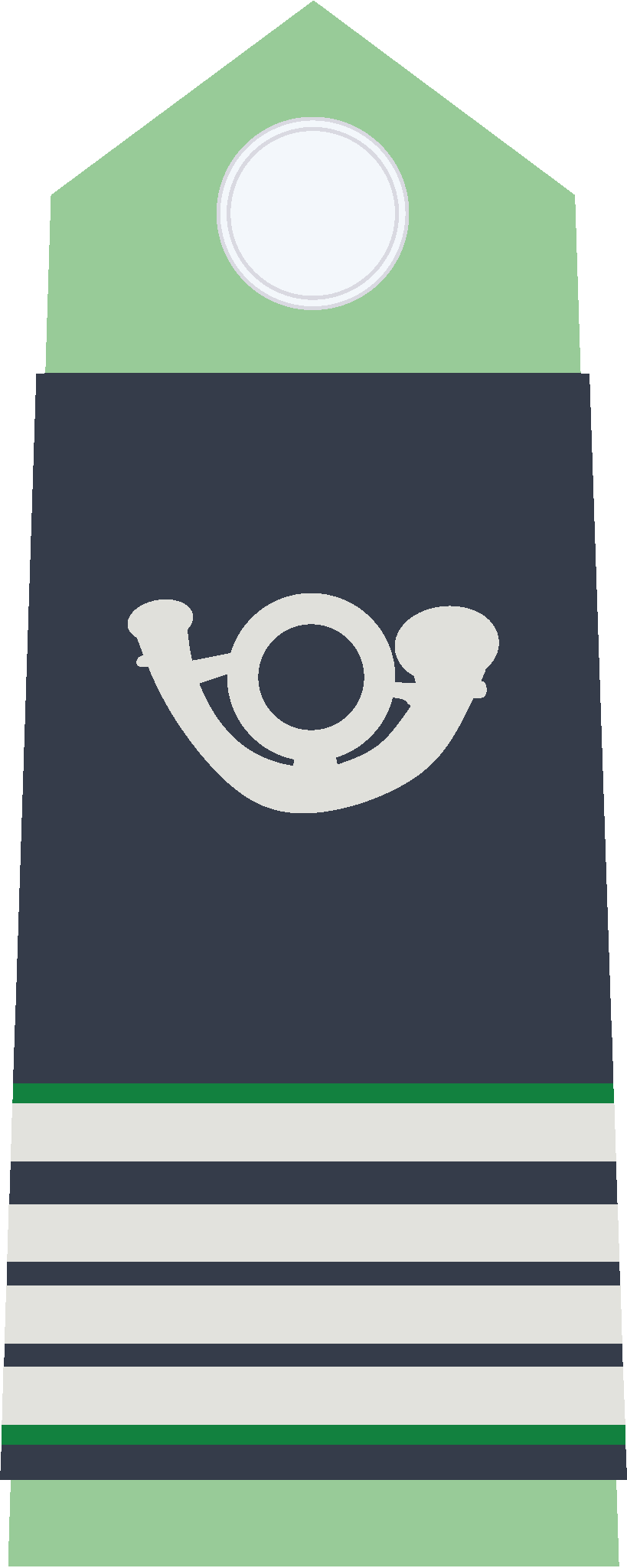
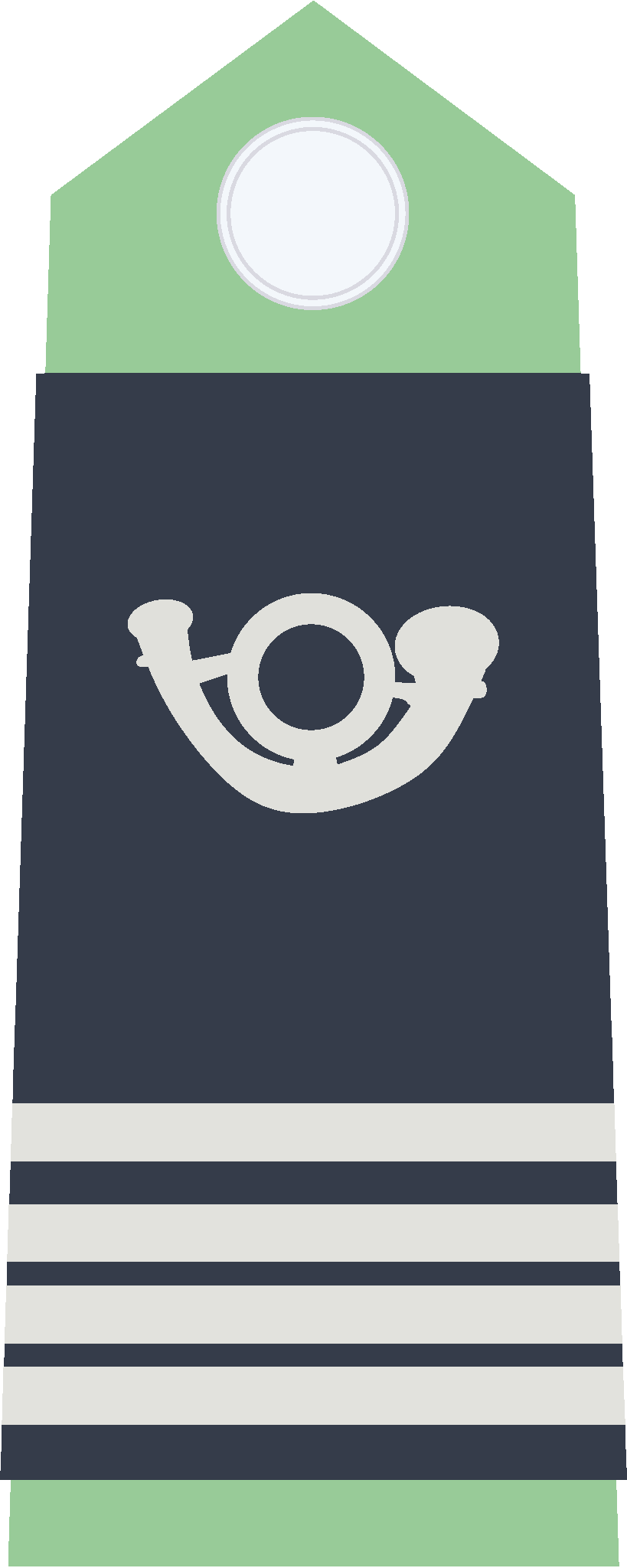
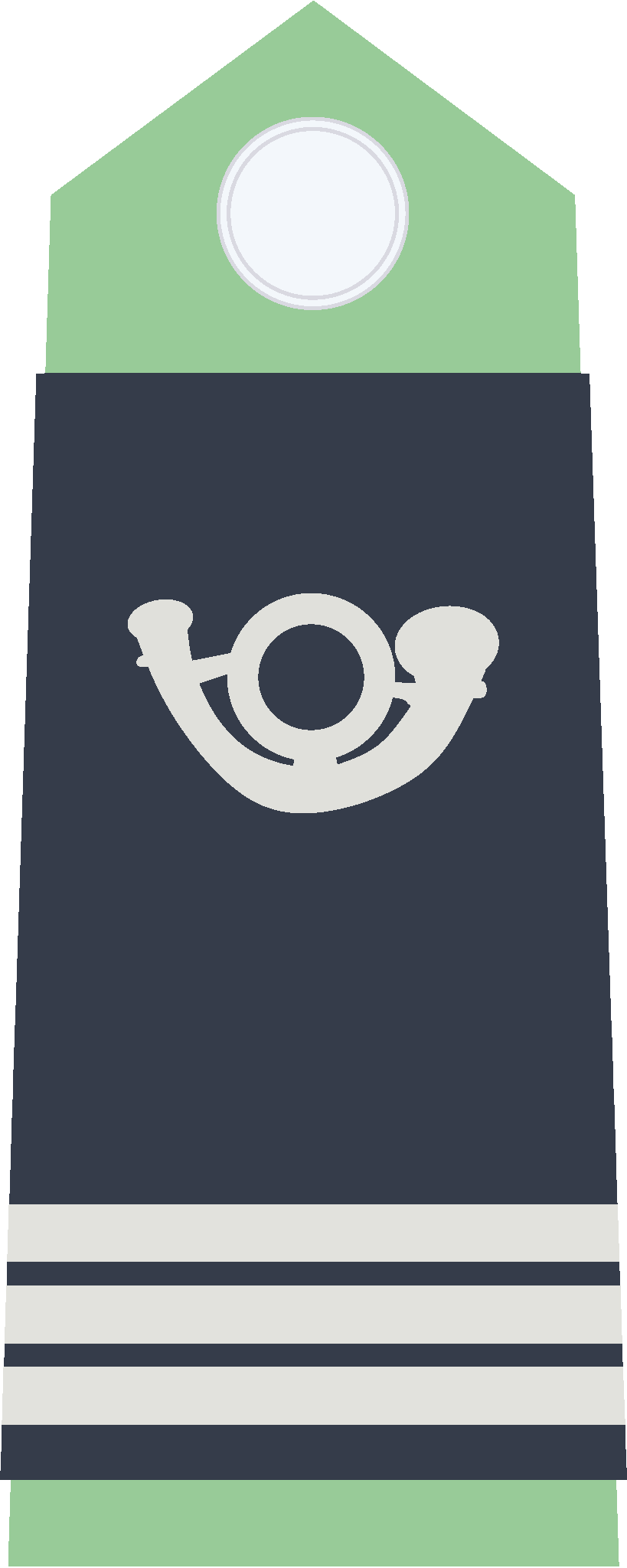
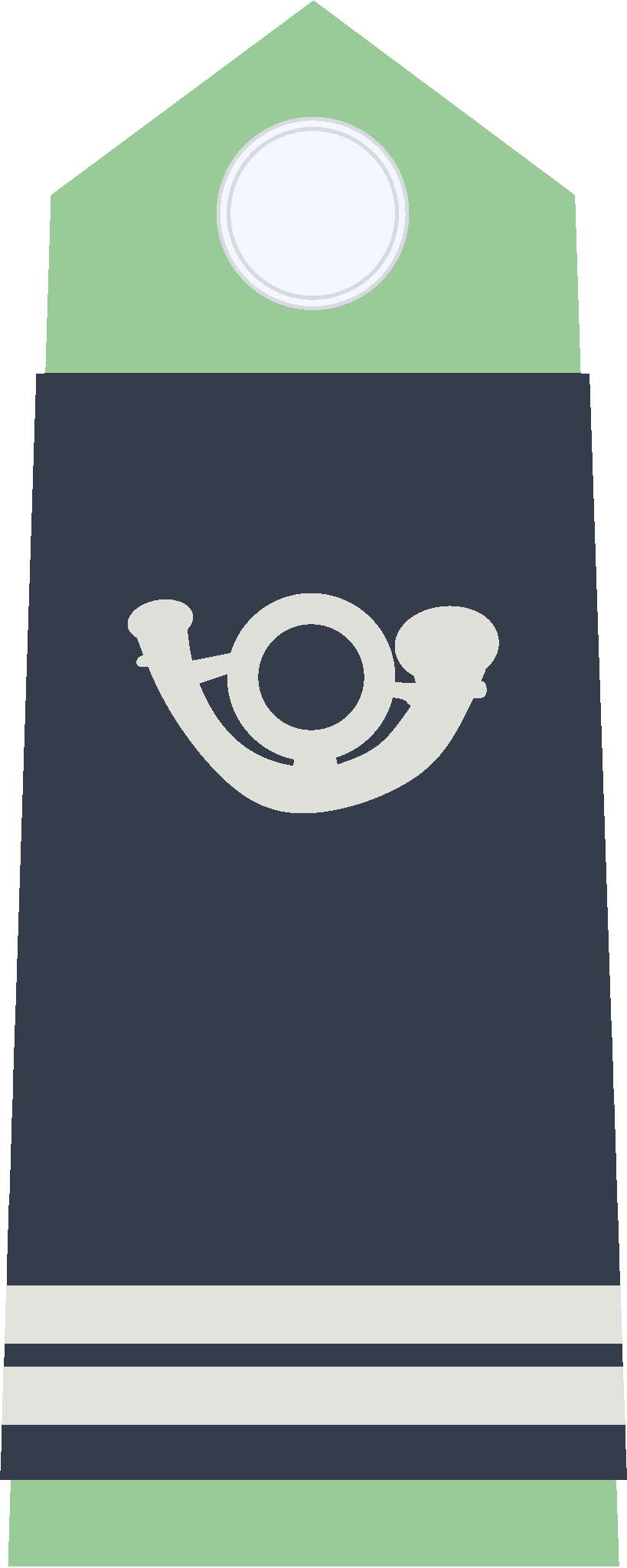
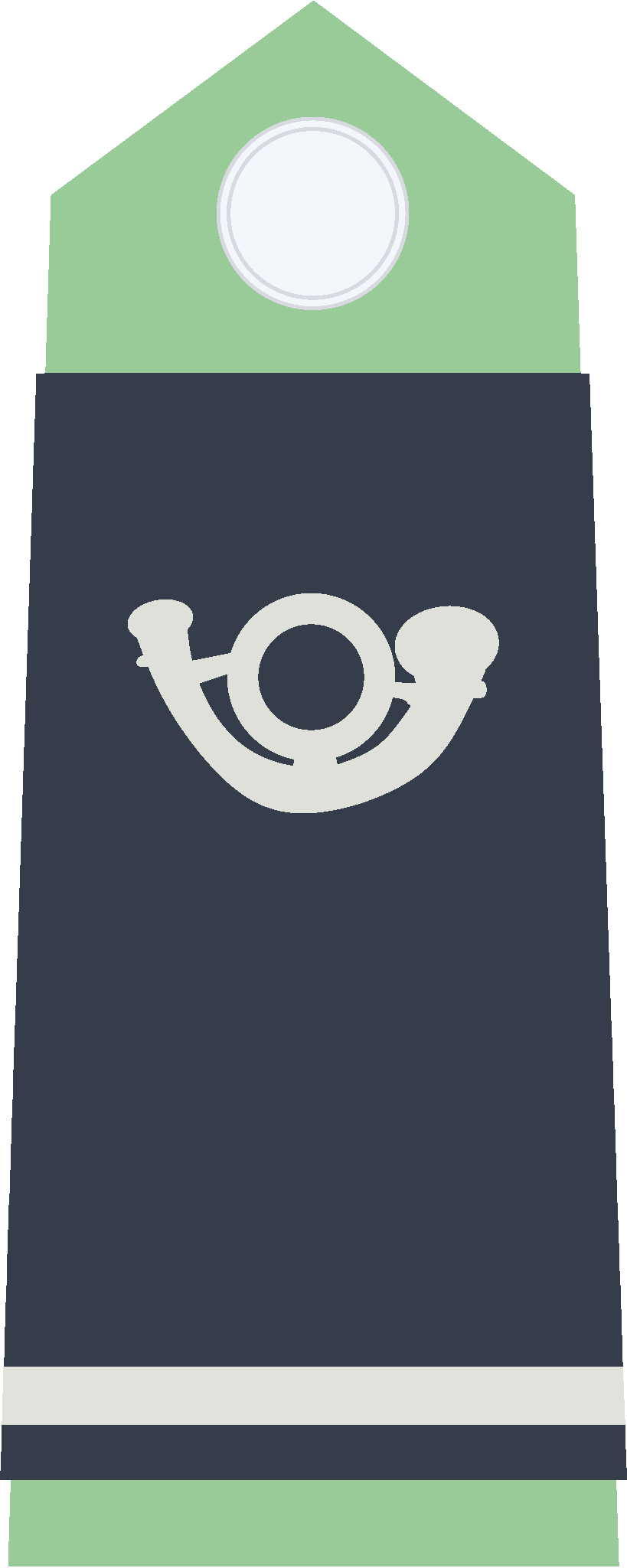
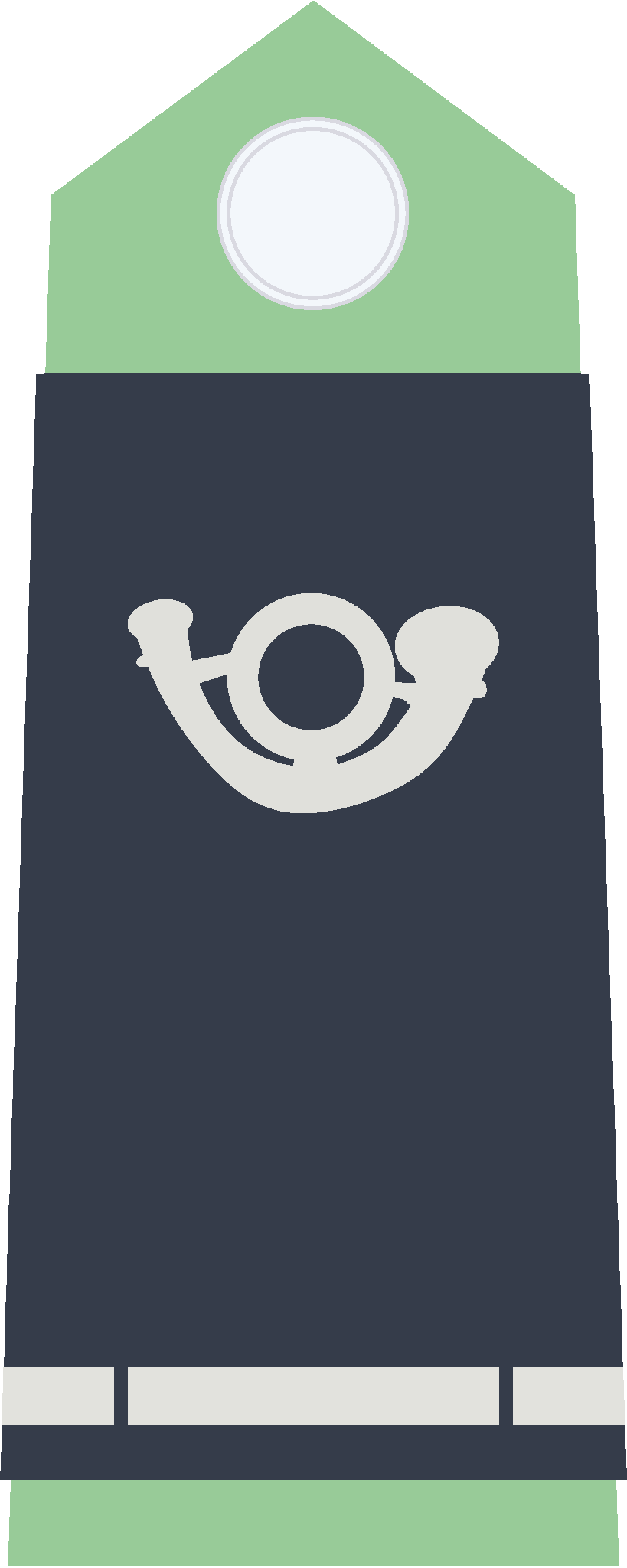
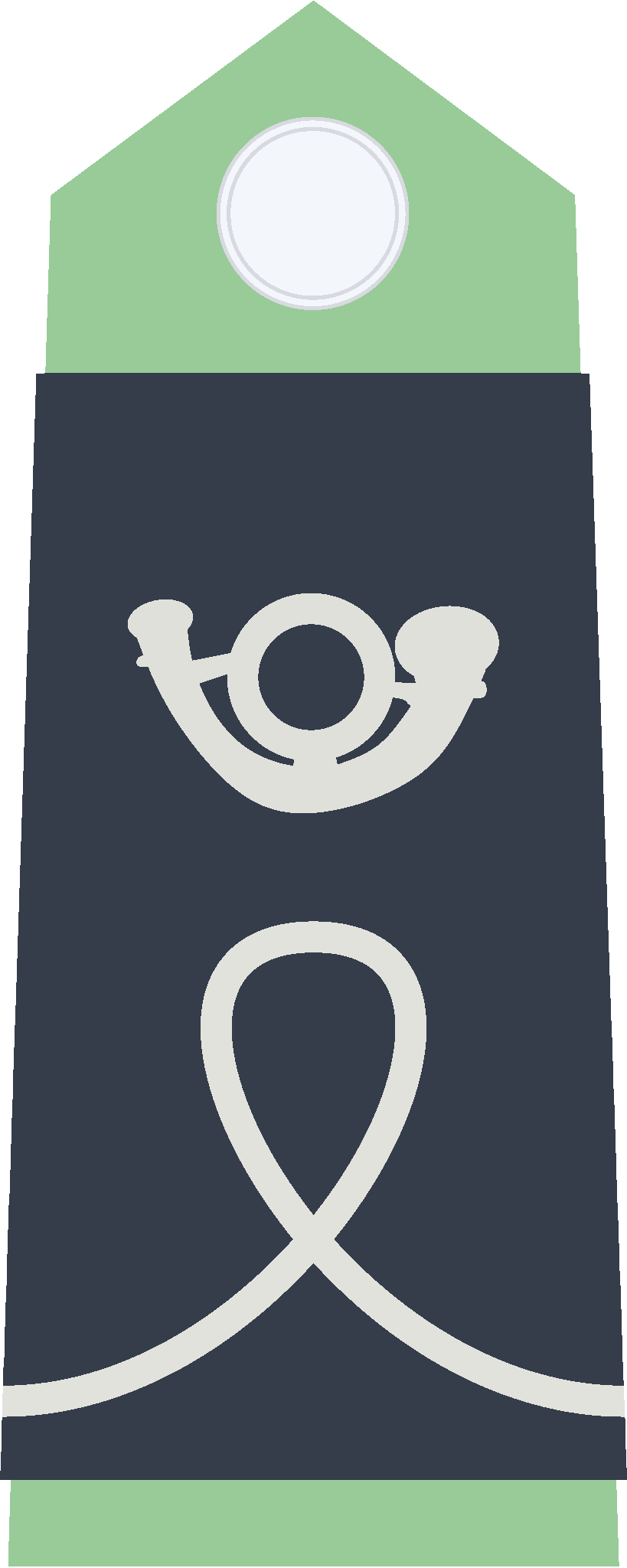
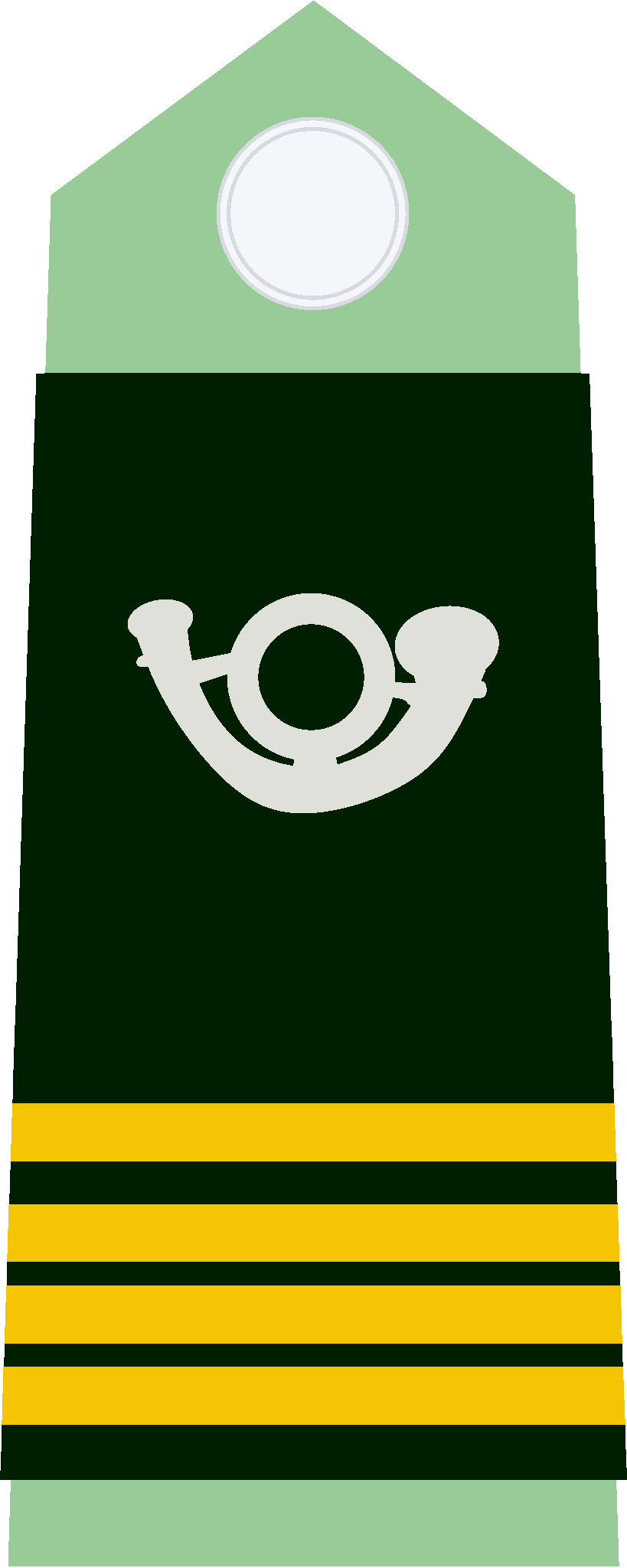
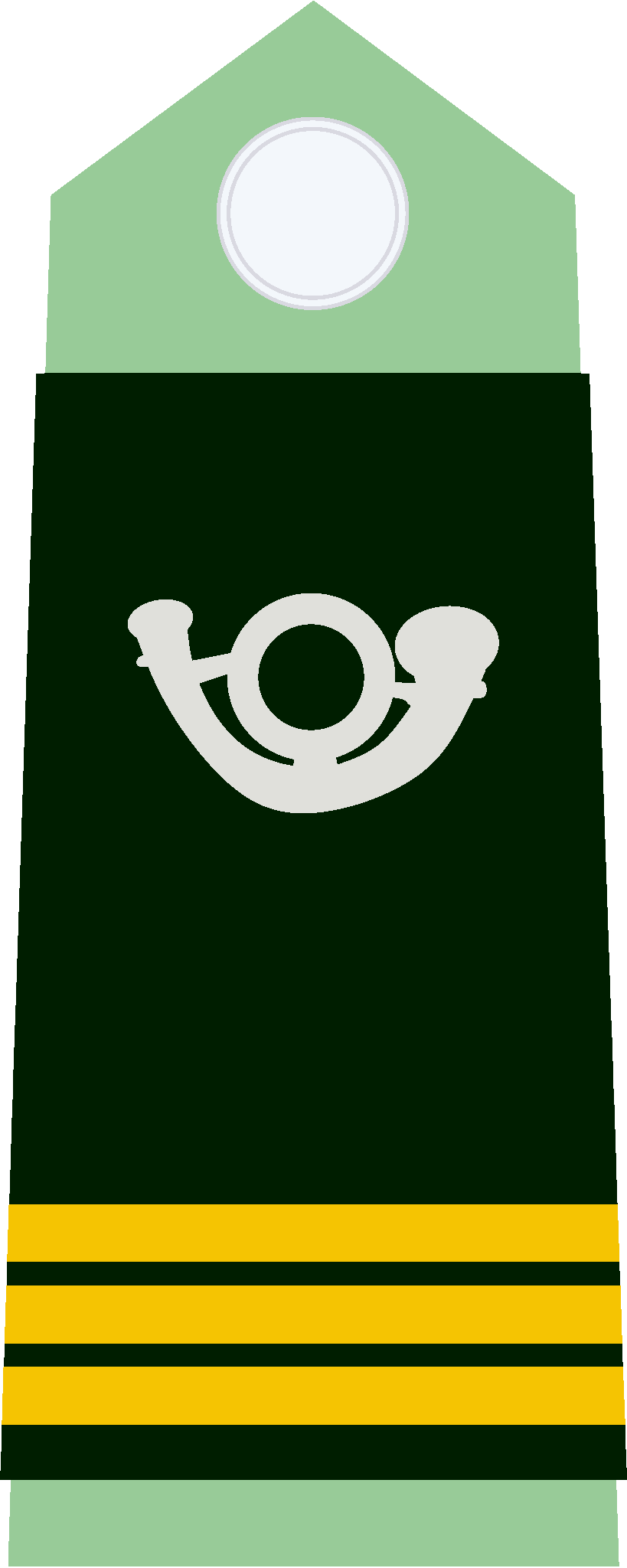
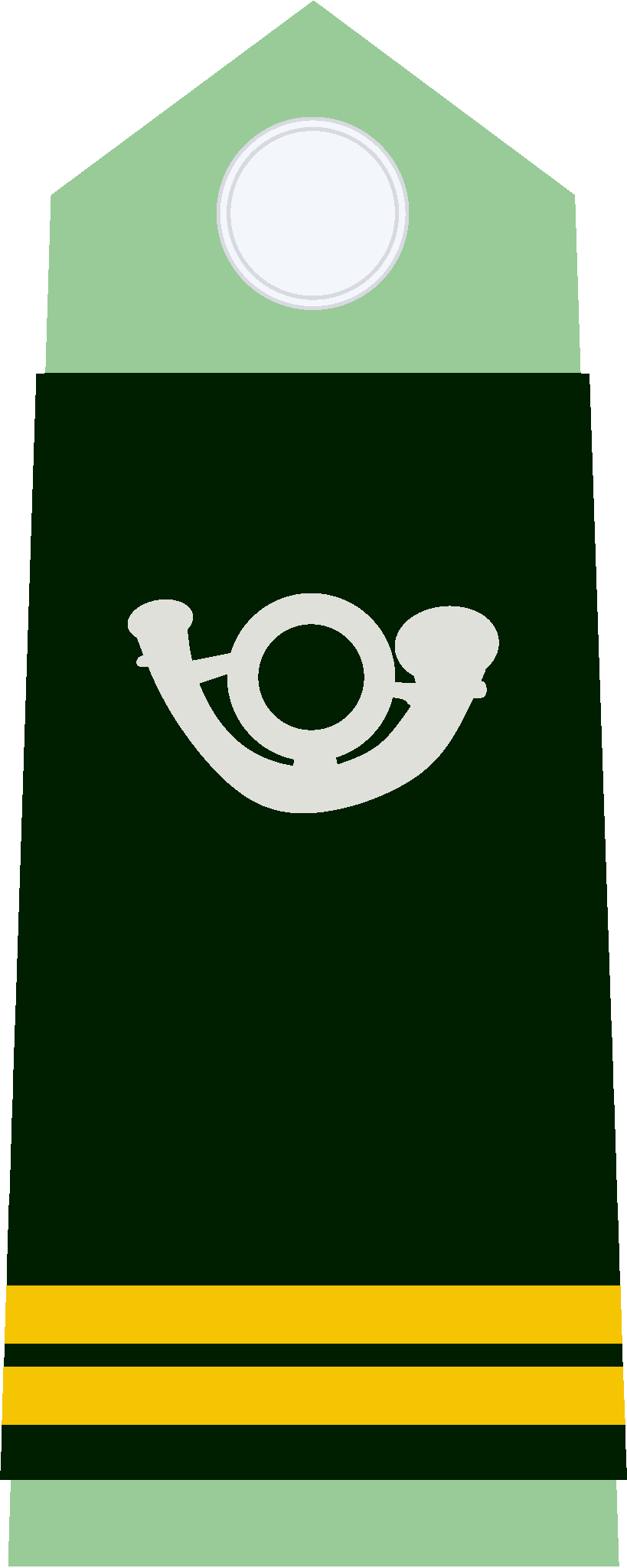
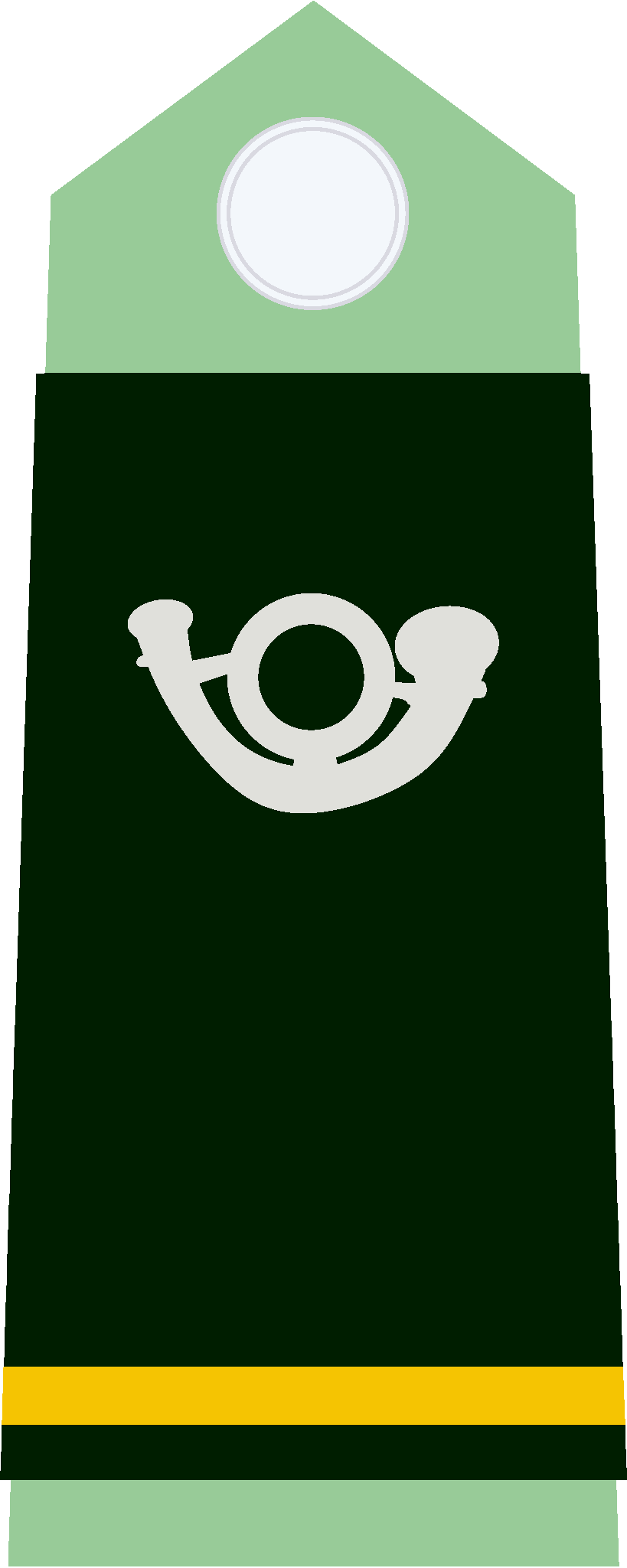
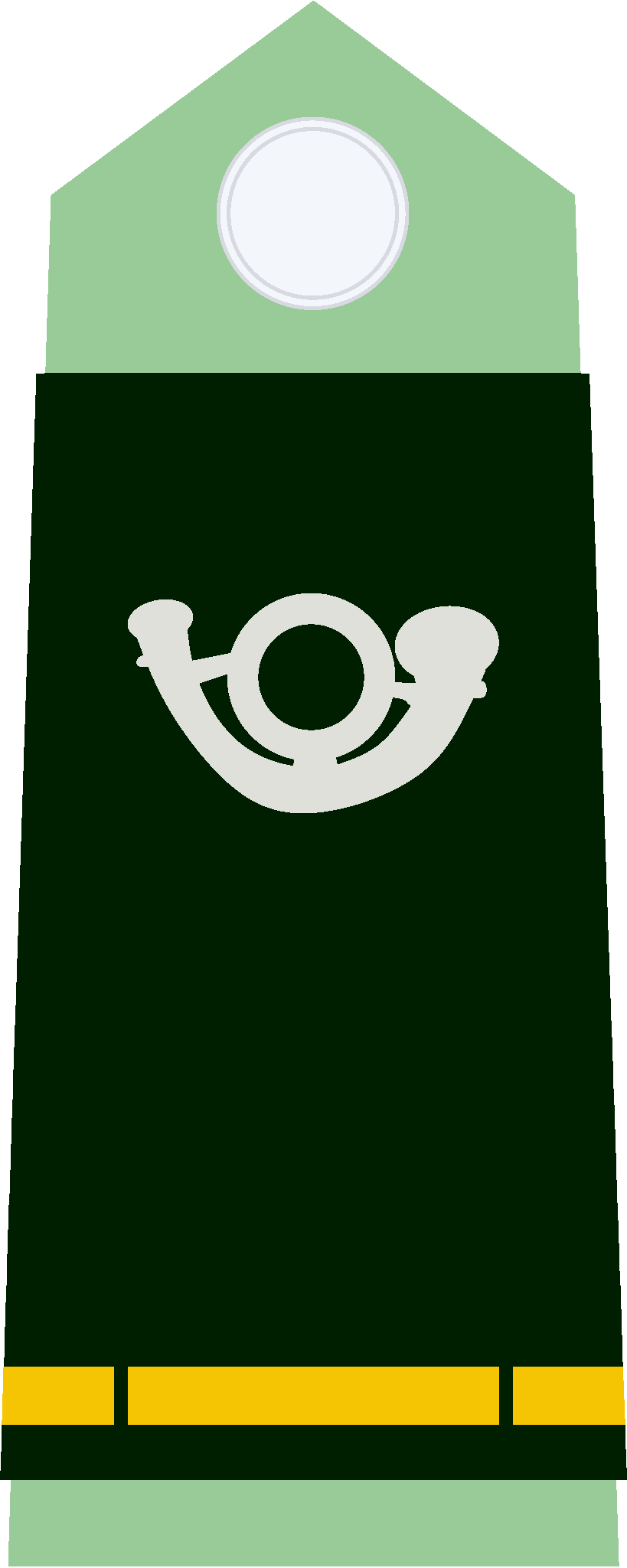
NATO code	OF-10	OF-9	OF-8	OF-7	OF-6	OF-5	OF-4	OF-3		OF-2	OF-1
Corps of Bridges, Waters and Forests
Corps of Bridges, Waters and Forests		Directeur général de l'Office national des forêts	Chef de l'Inspection générale de l'Office national des forêts	Ingénieur général de classe exceptionnelle des ponts, des eaux et des forêts	Ingénieur général de classe normale des ponts, des eaux et des forêts	Ingénieur en chef des ponts, des eaux et des forêts	Ingénieur des ponts, des eaux et des forêts - échelon 10-7	Ingénieur des ponts, des eaux et des forêts - échelon 6-5		Ingénieur des ponts, des eaux et des forêts - échelon 4-3	Ingénieur des ponts, des eaux et des forêts - échelon 2-1	Ingénieur-élève des ponts, des eaux et des forêts
Corps of Agriculture and Environments
Corps of Agriculture and Environments						Chef de mission de l'agriculture et de l'environnement	Ingénieur divisionnaire de l'agriculture et de l'environnement - échelon 8-4	Ingénieur divisionnaire de l'agriculture et de l'environnement - échelon 3-1	Ingénieur de l'agriculture et de l'environnement - échelon 10-7	Ingénieur de l'agriculture et de l'environnement - échelon 6-4	Ingénieur de l'agriculture et de l'environnement - échelon 3-2	Ingénieur de l'agriculture et de l'environnement - échelon 1	Ingénieur de l'agriculture et de l'environnement - stagiaire	Élève-ingénieur de l'agriculture et de l'environnement
Higher Forest Technicians
Higher Forest Technicians								Cadre technique de l'Office national des forêts		Chef Technicien forestier	Technicien forestier principal	Technicien supérieur forestier	Technicien supérieur forestier - stagiaire
NATO code	OF-10	OF-9	OF-8	OF-7	OF-6	OF-5	OF-4	OF-3		OF-2	OF-1

Enlisted

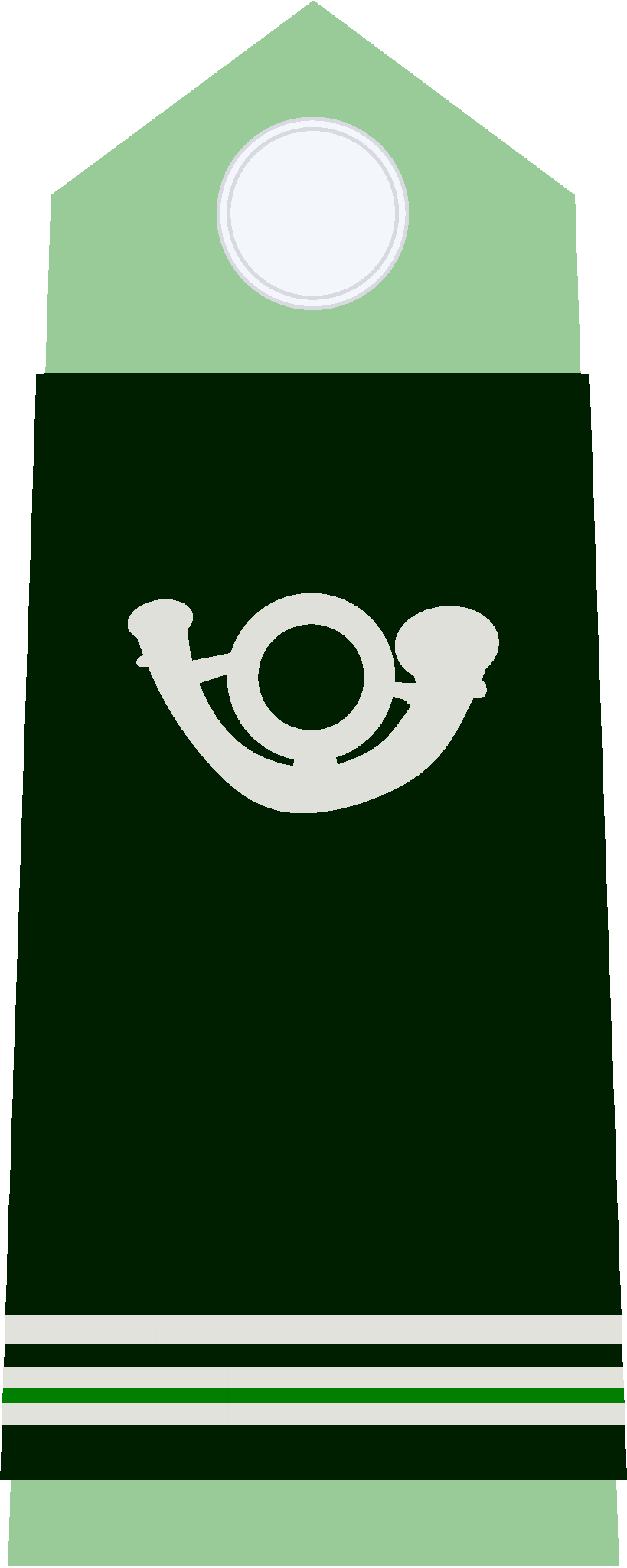
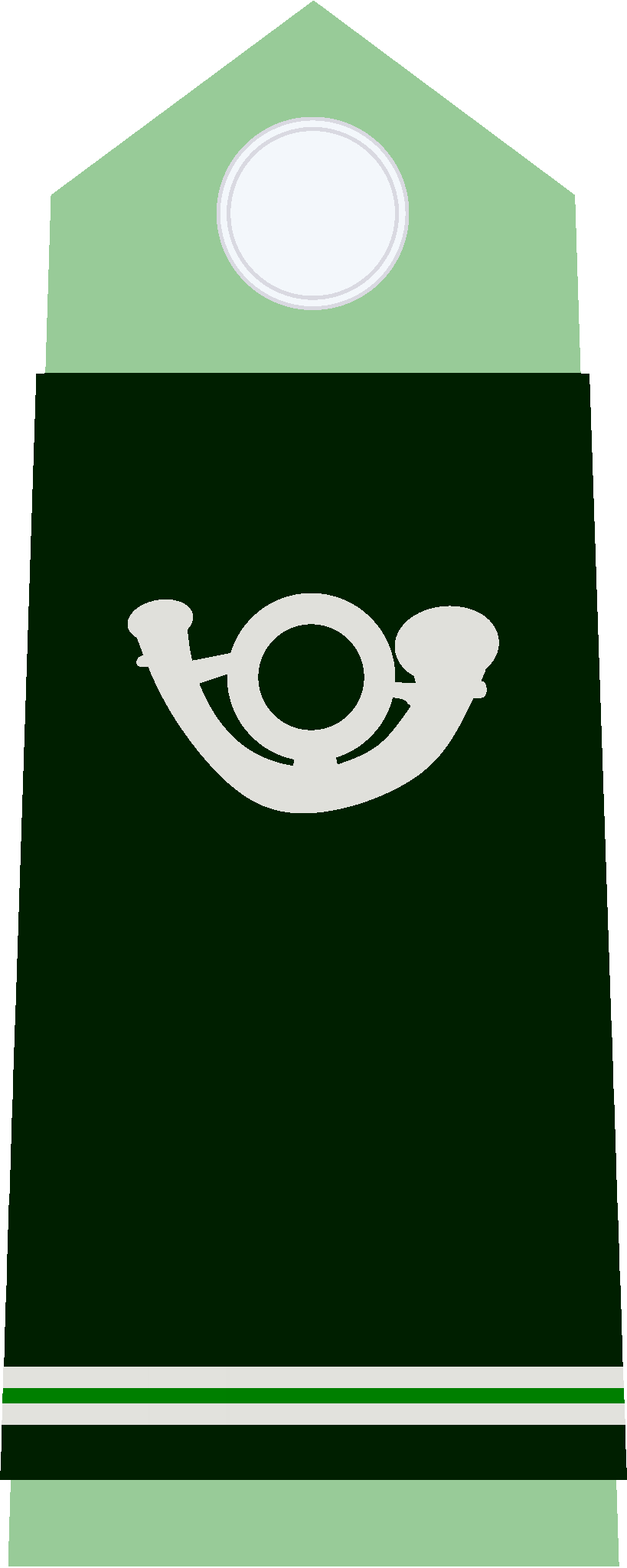
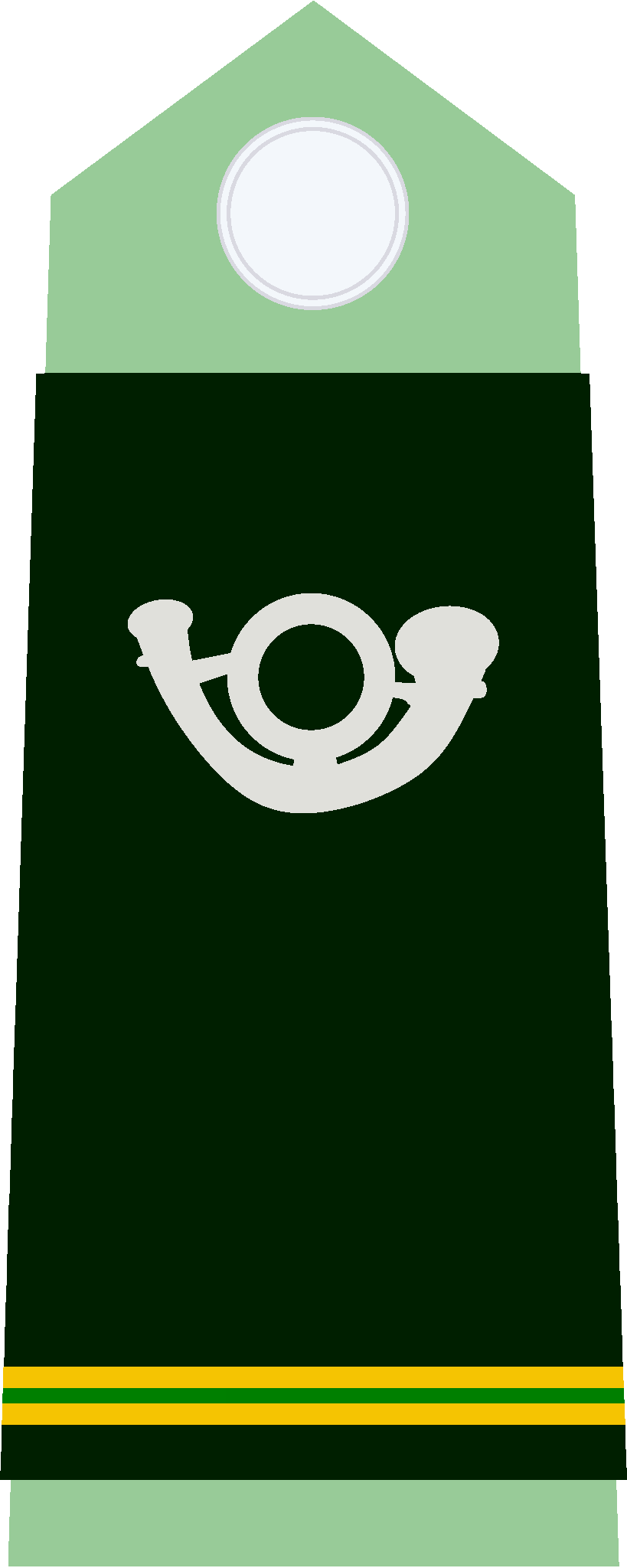
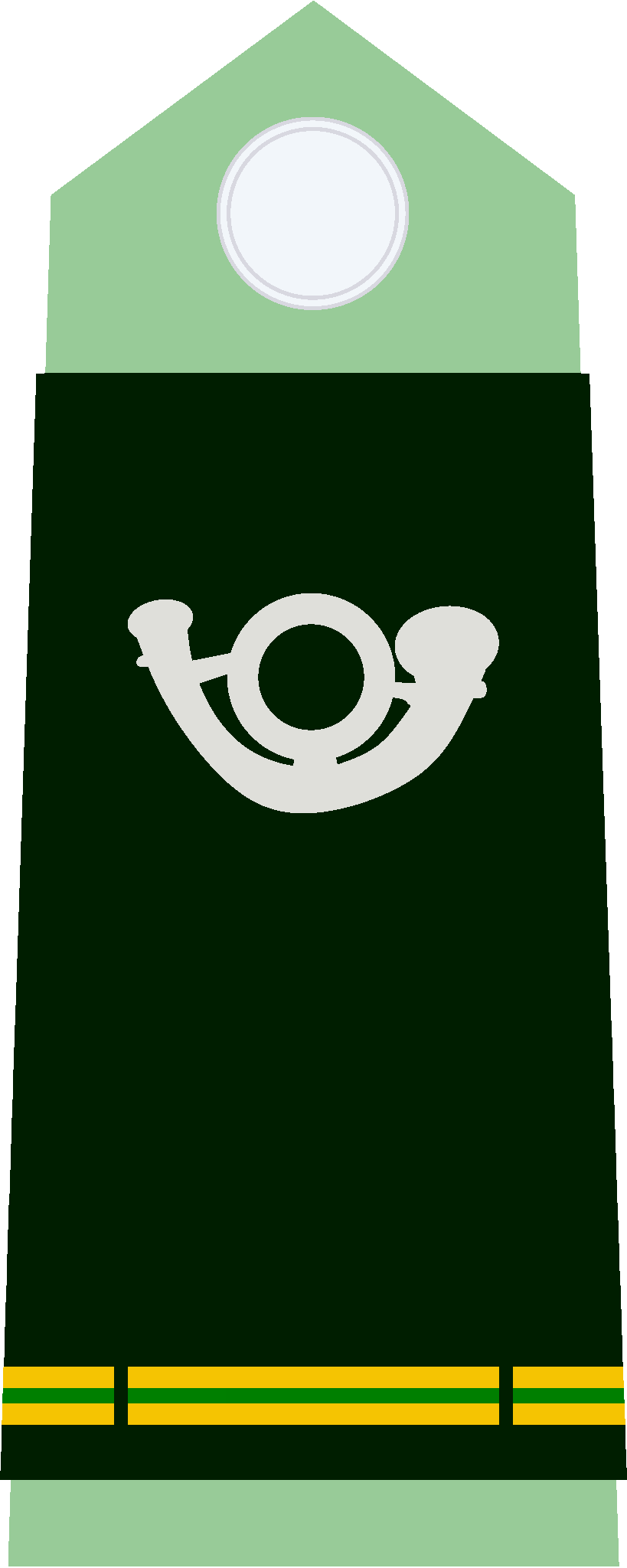
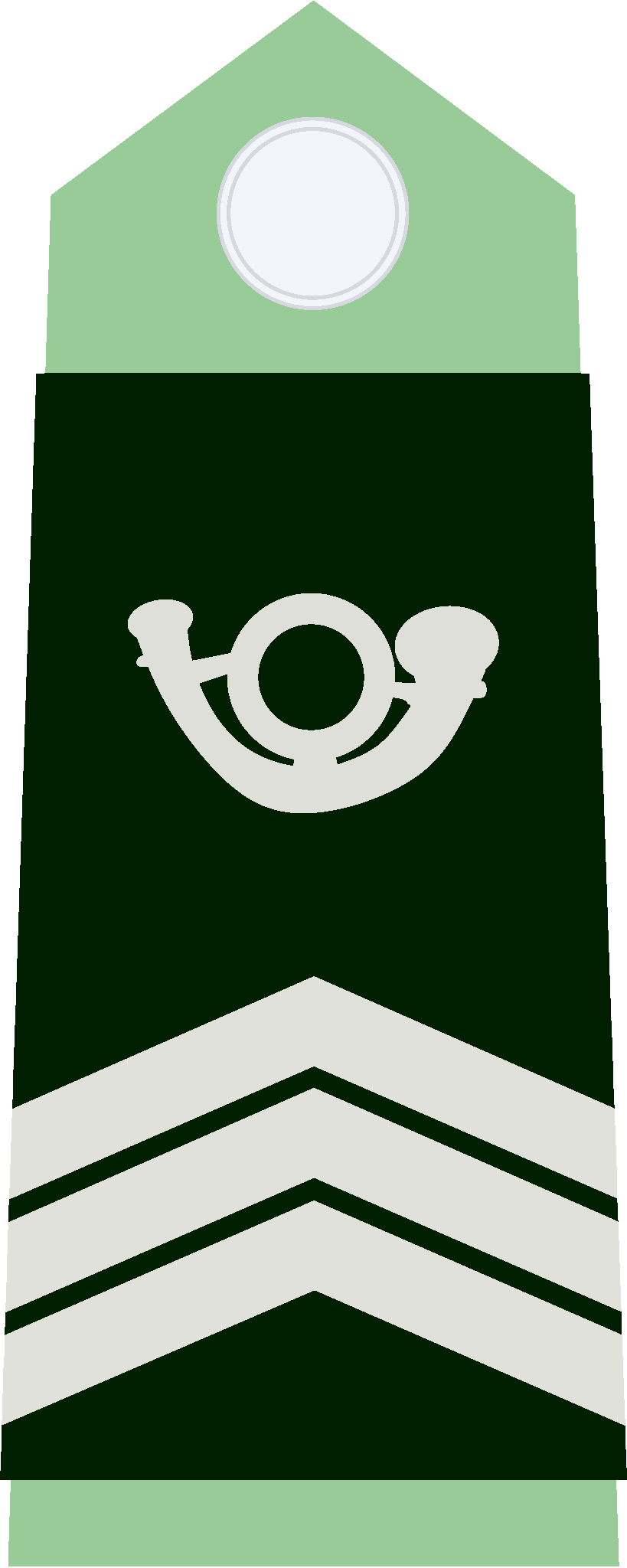
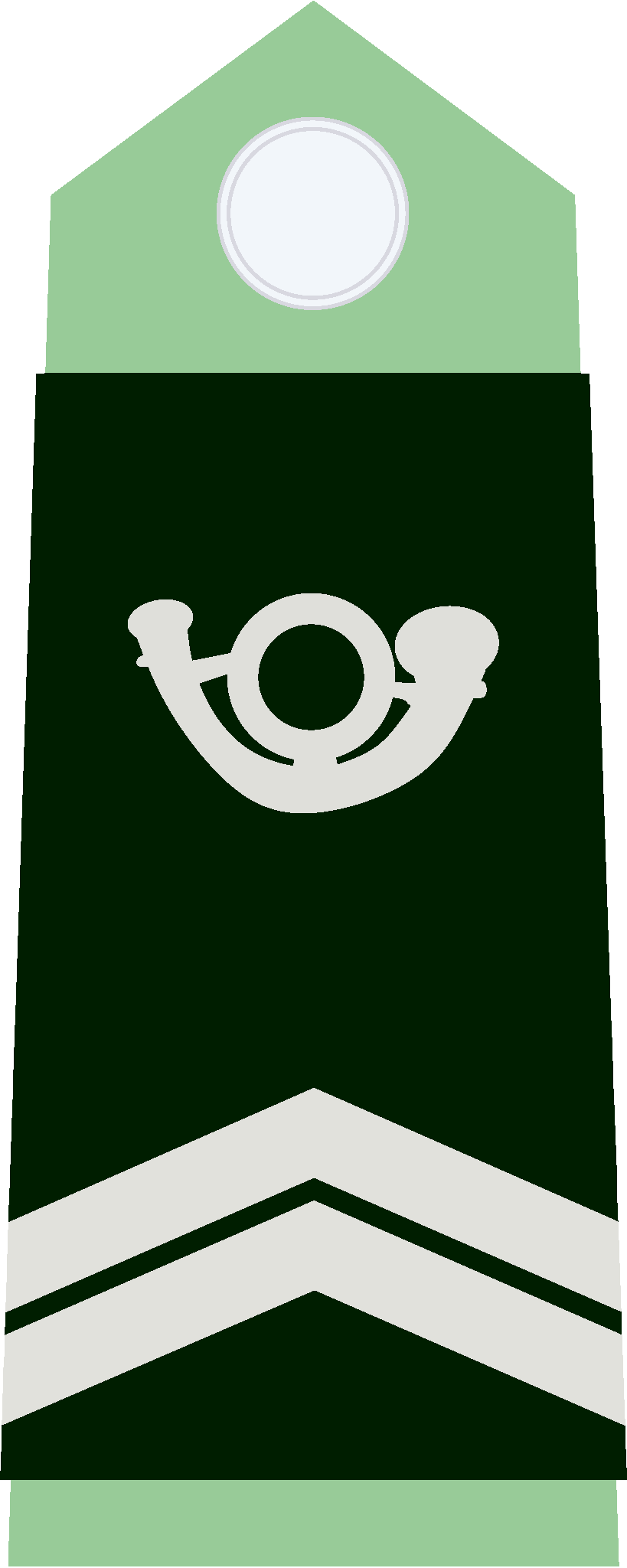
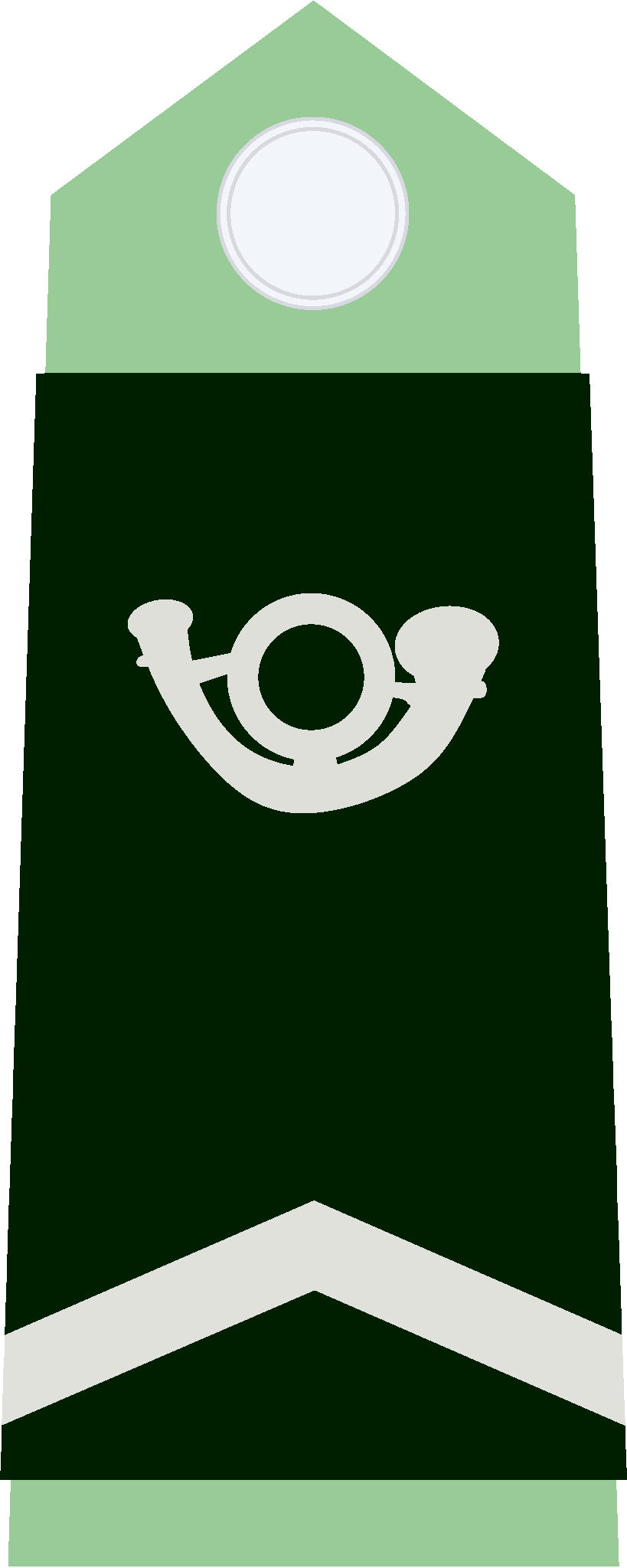
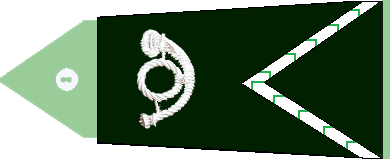
NATO code	OR-9		OR-8	OR-7	OR-6	OR-5			OR-4	OR-3	OR-2	OR-1
Operational Forest Technicians
Operational Forest Technicians	Technicien opérationnel forestier principal	Technicien opérationnel forestier - échelon 13-4	Technicien opérationnel forestier - échelon 3-1	Technicien opérationnel forestier - stagiaire
District Forest Rangers
District Forest Rangers					Chef de district forestier principal de 1er classe	Chef de district forestier principal de 2e classe	Chef de district forestier de 1er classe	Chef de district forestier de 2e classe
NATO code	OR-9		OR-8	OR-7	OR-6	OR-5			OR-4	OR-3	OR-2	OR-1
