= Huddinge Municipality =

Huddinge Municipality Huddinge kommun
- Municipality
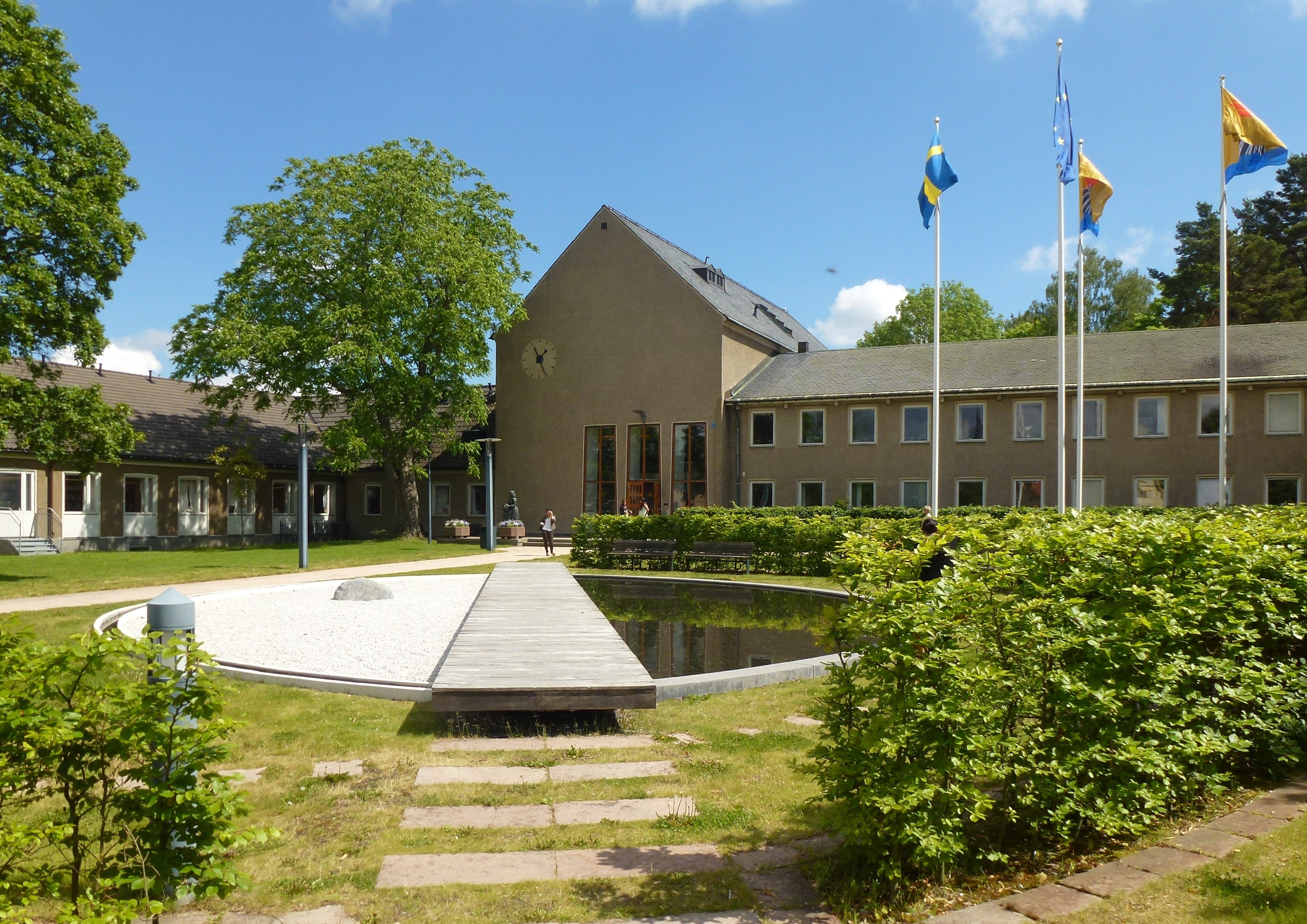
- Huddinge town hall

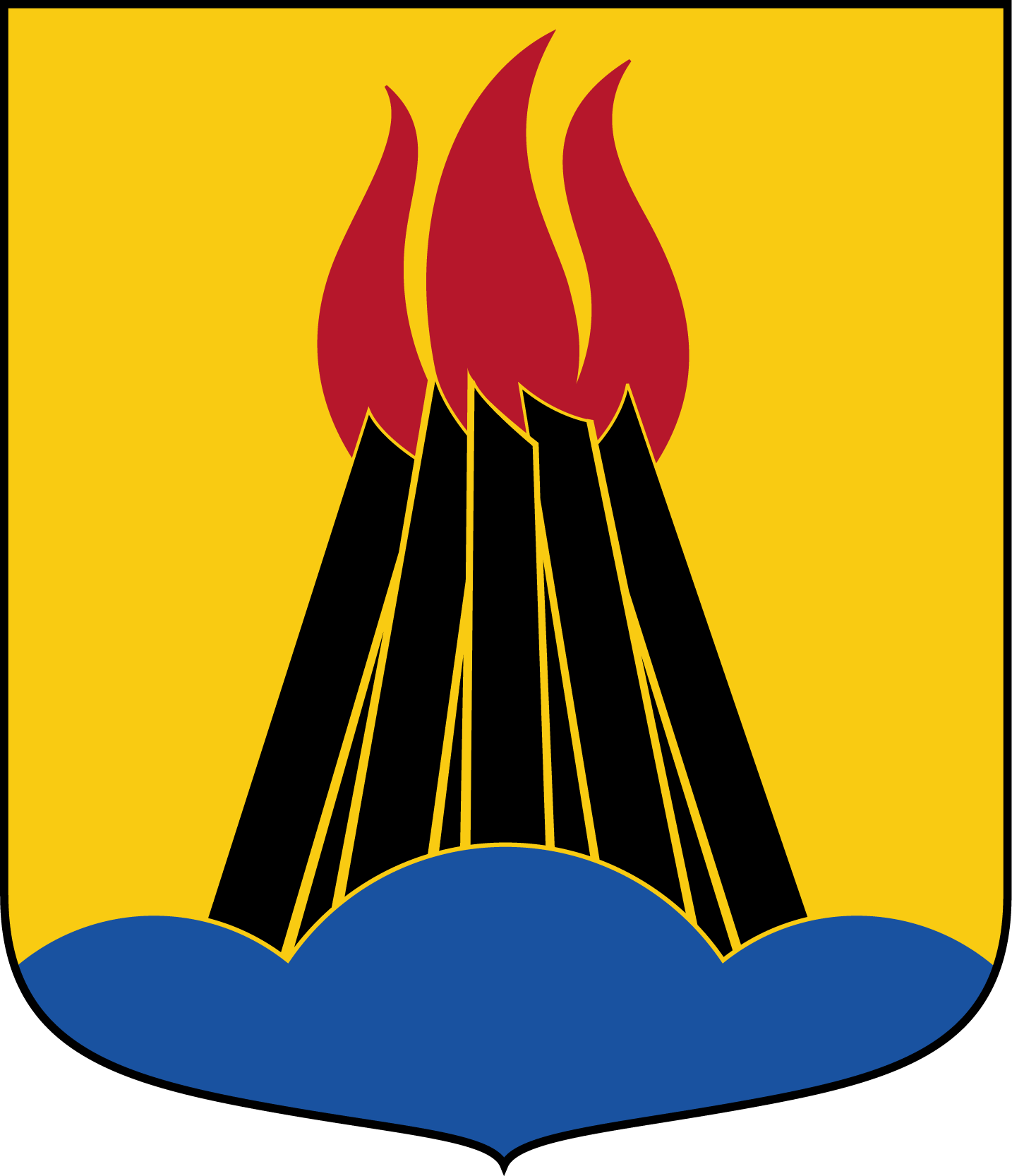
- Flag Coat of arms

- Coordinates: 59°14′N 17°59′E
- Country: Sweden
- County: Stockholm County
- Seat: Huddinge

Area
  - Total: 140.63 km^{2} (54.30 sq mi)
  - Land: 131.01 km^{2} (50.58 sq mi)
  - Water: 9.62 km^{2} (3.71 sq mi)
- Area as of 1 January 2014.

Population (30 June 2025)
  - Total: 114,507
  - Density: 874.03/km^{2} (2,263.7/sq mi)
- Time zone: UTC+1 (CET)
  - Summer (DST): UTC+2 (CEST)
- ISO 3166 code: SE
- Province: Södermanland
- Municipal code: 0126
- Website: www.huddinge.se
- Density is calculated using land area only.

Huddinge Municipality (Swedish: Huddinge kommun) is a municipality in Stockholm County, east central Sweden. Its seat is located in Huddinge (pronounced [hɵ̂dːɪŋɛ]), that is a part of Stockholm urban area.

The municipality is, with its approximately 110,000 inhabitants, the second most populated in Stockholm County.

== Geography ==
The municipality covers the entire central part of the Södertörn peninsula. More than half of the land area consists of agriculture, forests, hills, or lakes, and it contains 13 nature reserves.

Huddinge borders the following municipalities: Stockholm Municipality, Ekerö Municipality (by water), Botkyrka Municipality, Haninge Municipality and Tyresö Municipality (by water).

=== Localities ===
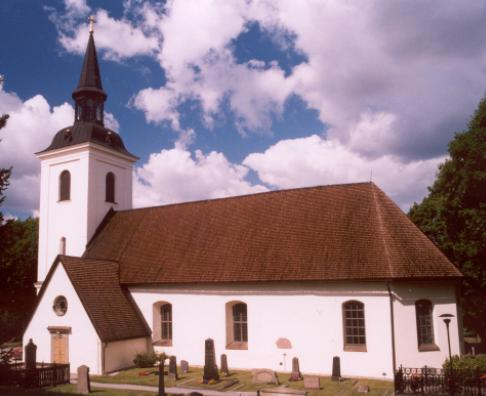
Huddinge Church

- Stockholm urban area (part of) 86,802 inh.
- Vidja 633 inh.
- Rural areas 2,465 inh.

=== Subdivisions ===
Huddinge municipality is sub-divided into six districts:

- Flemingsberg (pop. 14,924)
- Segeltorp (pop. 11,870)
- Sjödalen-Fullersta (pop. 22,304)
- Skogås (pop. 13,783)
- Stuvsta-Snättringe (pop. 15,847)
- Trångsund (pop. 9,912)
- Vårby (pop. 10,115), including Masmo

There are four territorial parishes of the Church of Sweden within the municipality: Huddinge, Trångsund, Flemingsberg and St. Mikael.

=== Natural reserves ===
- Björksättra Peninsula Nature Reserve
- Drevviken Nature Reserve
- Flemingsbergsskogen Nature Reserve
- Gladö Kvarnsjön Nature Reserve
- Gladöskogen Nature Reserve
- Gömmaren Nature Reserve, including the Fullersta kvarn Natura 2000 area.
- Gömsta Äng Nature Reserve
- Korpberget Nature Reserve
- Lissmadalen Nature Reserve
- Lännaskogen Nature Reserve, including Lissma-Kvarnsjö and Lännaskogen Natura 2000 areas.
- Orlången Nature Reserve
- Paradiset Nature Reserve, including Granby and Hanveden Natura 2000 areas.
- Trångsundsskogen Nature Reserve

=== Lakes ===
- Vårbyfjärden
- Albysjön
- Gömmaren
- Långsjön
- Trehörningen
- Mörtsjön
- Orlången
- Kvarnsjön-Gladö
- Kärrsjön
- Holmträsket
- Rudträsket
- Ådran
- Trehörningen-Paradiset
- Långsjön-Paradiset
- Ormputten
- Öran
- Lissmasjön
- Trylen
- Kvarnsjön-Lissma
- Ågestasjön
- Magelungen
- Drevviken

== History ==
Huddinge is a locality believed to trace its origins back at least 1,000 years, preceding the Viking Age. In times of conflict, the inhabitants of Huddinge would ascend to elevated areas to light beacons as a warning signal against approaching hostile ships. This practice was common throughout the entirety of Lake Mälaren, where beacons were strategically placed. The coat of arms of Huddinge is derived from this tradition of beacon lighting. The name "Huddinge" is thought to be rooted in the term "Uddung," referring to the area's earliest known inhabitants. During the Iron Age, these individuals resided along the shores of Lake Mälaren.

=== Split into two municipalities ===
After years of protests from inhabitants and after much debate, it was decided in 2007 to hold a referendum in 2008 regarding a split to make the eastern part of Huddinge its own municipality, named in published documents as Huddinge östra ("Huddinge East"). However only the inhabitants of eastern Huddinge would be allowed to vote. This caused a major political split of opinions as the political opposition wanted to see a vote. At least 60% of the inhabitants of eastern Huddinge had to vote "yes" for the split for it to be approved.

The referendum ended with a clear "no" to the split, ending the discussion.

== Demography ==
Huddinge has a total population of roughly 110,000, or 4.5% of the population of Stockholm County. The average age is 36.7 years, but one-third of the population is under 25 years of age. This means that Huddinge has a slightly younger population than both Stockholm County (38.9 years) and the whole country (40.6 years). The population density of the municipality is increasing significantly. Since the 1960s, the population has doubled in size and is currently among the 14 largest municipalities in Sweden. The population of Huddinge passed the one of Gävle in 2008, and the ones of Eskilstuna and Sundsvall as well in 2009.

=== Population ===
Population development in Huddinge Municipality 1970–2017
Year	Population
1970	54,732
1975	62,576
1980	66,570
1985	70,209
1990	73,829
1995	77,384
2000	84,535
2005	88,750
2010	97,453
2015	105,311
2017	110,003
2019	112,848

=== 2022 by district ===
This is a demographic table based on Huddinge Municipality's electoral districts in the 2022 Swedish general election sourced from SVT's election platform, in turn taken from SCB official statistics.

In total there were 113,678 residents, including 76,114 Swedish citizens of voting age. 50.9% voted for the left coalition and 46.9% for the right coalition. Indicators are in percentage points except population totals and income.

Location	Residents	Citizen adults	Left vote	Right vote	Employed	Swedish parents	Foreign heritage	Income SEK	Degree
Location			%	%					
Balingsnäs	1,943	1,271	49.0	49.5	89	81	19	35,218	57
Flemingsberg N	1,113	774	67.2	26.6	62	17	83	16,146	33
Flemingsberg S	2,071	867	74.8	21.1	48	20	80	5,478	75
Fridhem	1,999	1,428	48.9	50.4	87	84	16	35,663	62
Fullersta gård	1,466	1,097	51.4	47.0	84	80	20	31,970	57
Fullersta torg	1,282	1,106	50.2	49.0	80	75	25	26,979	50
Fållan-Nytorp	2,182	1,522	47.5	51.4	85	76	24	33,837	53
Gladökvarn-Lissma	1,565	1,149	35.8	63.0	81	81	19	29,947	31
Glömsta N	1,635	973	39.0	59.1	84	54	46	31,531	50
Glömsta S	1,574	1,002	43.4	55.4	82	57	43	32,887	50
Grantorp N	1,863	1,131	68.3	20.8	60	12	88	17,323	30
Grantorp Ö	2,256	1,177	65.7	28.9	67	14	86	19,095	40
Haga	1,610	1,079	63.6	31.6	63	22	78	17,901	35
Hammartorp	1,774	1,288	49.9	49.0	82	60	40	26,199	44
Huddinge C	1,516	1,182	58.4	38.8	73	58	42	21,683	37
Hörningsnäs	1,765	1,195	51.8	47.4	87	80	20	35,511	60
Juringe	1,830	1,358	43.6	55.7	84	65	35	33,562	49
Kråkvik-Kungens kurva	2,399	1,611	47.0	51.6	77	68	32	31,737	55
Kvarnbergsplan	1,343	1,040	52.3	46.2	85	68	32	26,868	45
Kynäs	2,296	1,614	44.7	54.4	85	80	20	35,322	55
Källbrink	1,639	1,137	44.5	54.9	87	79	21	39,751	62
Kästa	1,492	944	47.5	49.8	76	37	63	26,206	45
Länna	2,624	1,675	38.0	59.8	82	63	37	32,394	44
Milsten	1,795	1,217	49.6	49.4	87	82	18	35,722	62
Myrstuguberget	1,127	740	60.2	35.1	73	28	72	22,543	43
Myrängen-Högmora	2,566	1,716	46.0	53.2	89	78	22	35,310	55
Paradisbacken	1,615	1,354	48.5	49.8	80	71	29	26,617	47
Segeltorp C	1,678	1,221	50.4	48.6	87	79	21	35,398	58
Segersminne	1,413	1,052	53.2	46.4	87	80	20	32,054	61
Sjöängen	1,742	1,179	41.1	57.7	88	79	21	42,174	64
Skogsäng	2,133	1,539	52.9	45.7	84	80	20	36,537	61
Smista V	1,595	1,073	49.1	48.3	82	52	48	29,325	45
Smista Ö	2,135	1,408	46.2	52.1	80	57	43	30,470	47
Snättringe gård	1,603	1,162	45.8	53.7	88	84	16	40,517	66
Solgård	2,069	1,420	47.4	51.6	84	72	28	33,495	56
Stensängen	1,416	956	52.5	46.4	86	82	18	37,573	58
Stortorp	1,794	1,256	42.7	56.3	86	78	22	34,463	54
Storängen	1,301	1,067	48.5	49.1	84	63	37	31,086	56
Stuvsta C	1,519	1,083	52.6	46.8	84	73	27	33,072	61
Stuvsta gård	1,580	1,107	49.6	48.9	86	75	25	34,869	59
Sörskogen	1,271	897	44.2	54.8	86	78	22	32,151	52
Tomtberga N	1,626	1,198	49.3	48.0	81	65	35	26,507	41
Tomtberga S	1,664	1,292	55.6	42.7	76	66	34	24,981	44
Trångsund C	1,859	1,389	53.1	45.2	77	61	39	23,365	35
Utsälje	1,927	1,355	40.3	59.0	87	80	20	37,806	59
Utsälje C	1,622	1,178	46.9	52.1	87	81	19	33,233	50
Vidja-Mellansjö	1,714	1,165	40.6	58.1	81	74	26	31,900	41
Vistaberg	2,734	1,482	49.7	49.2	91	75	25	41,268	66
Visättra	1,631	914	63.7	32.0	72	30	70	22,974	50
Visättra V	1,963	1,385	66.0	29.1	63	29	71	17,287	40
Visättra Ö	1,839	1,066	64.6	31.2	69	26	74	20,807	43
Visättra-Björnkulla	1,315	773	60.6	36.0	66	30	70	19,655	43
Vårby gård	1,476	905	60.3	33.4	70	26	74	22,361	36
Vårby gård C	2,103	1,270	70.1	24.3	68	18	82	19,453	28
Vårby gård V	2,015	951	75.4	20.6	65	12	88	18,123	26
Vårby gård Ö	2,269	1,333	72.2	21.0	56	16	84	16,064	26
Vårdkasen-Rosenhill	1,895	1,282	46.2	52.6	84	72	28	31,959	55
Västra Skogås C	2,179	1,391	61.8	32.6	63	30	70	17,739	28
Västra Skogås N	1,860	1,186	57.2	38.9	75	42	58	22,571	36
Västra Skogås S	1,349	784	58.6	35.3	79	34	66	23,295	40
Västra Skogås V	1,737	930	60.7	30.7	70	22	78	21,121	29
Östra Skogås C	1,502	1,077	50.6	46.4	78	61	39	25,879	43
Östra Skogås N	1,996	1,399	48.7	49.3	81	63	37	30,515	47
Östra Skogås S	1,814	1,342	50.1	48.4	82	66	34	29,524	48
Source: SVT

=== Residents with a foreign background ===
On 31 December 2017, the number of people with a foreign background (persons born outside Sweden or with two parents born abroad) was 43,699, or 39.73% of the population (110,003 on 31 December 2017). On 31 December 2002, the number of residents with a foreign background was (per the same definition) 24,319, or 28.13% of the population (86,457 on 31 December 2002). On 31 December 2017, there were 110,003 residents in Huddinge, of which 32,190 people (29.26%) were born in a country other than Sweden. Divided by country in the table below - the Nordic countries as well as the 12 most common countries of birth outside Sweden for Swedish residents have been included, with other countries of birth bundled together by continent by Statistics Sweden.

Country of birth
31 December 2017
1	Sweden	77,813
2	Asia: Other countries	4,810
3	European Union: Other countries	3,797
4	Iraq	2,847
5	Africa: Other countries	2,812
6	Finland	2,381
7	Turkey	2,340
8	Poland	2,267
9	South America	2,019
10	Europe outside the EU: other countries	1,657
11	Syria	1,061
12	Iran	980
13	Yugoslavia/Yugoslavia; SFR Yugoslavia/Serbia and Montenegro	878
14	Afghanistan	762
15	North America	703
16	Thailand	585
17	Germany	507
18	Bosnia and Herzegovina	457
19	Eritrea	366
20	Norway	248
21	Somalia	235
22	Denmark	148
23	Soviet Union	123
24	Iceland	102
25	Oceania	81
26	Unknown country of birth	24

== Schools ==
In 2012 there were 27 public schools and five independent schools. Huddinge also has five public high schools with about 3400 students combined, these are:

- Huddingegymnasiet
- Östra Gymnasiet
- Sjödalsgymnasiet
- Sågbäcksgymnasiet
- Widerströmska gymnasiet

== Public transport ==
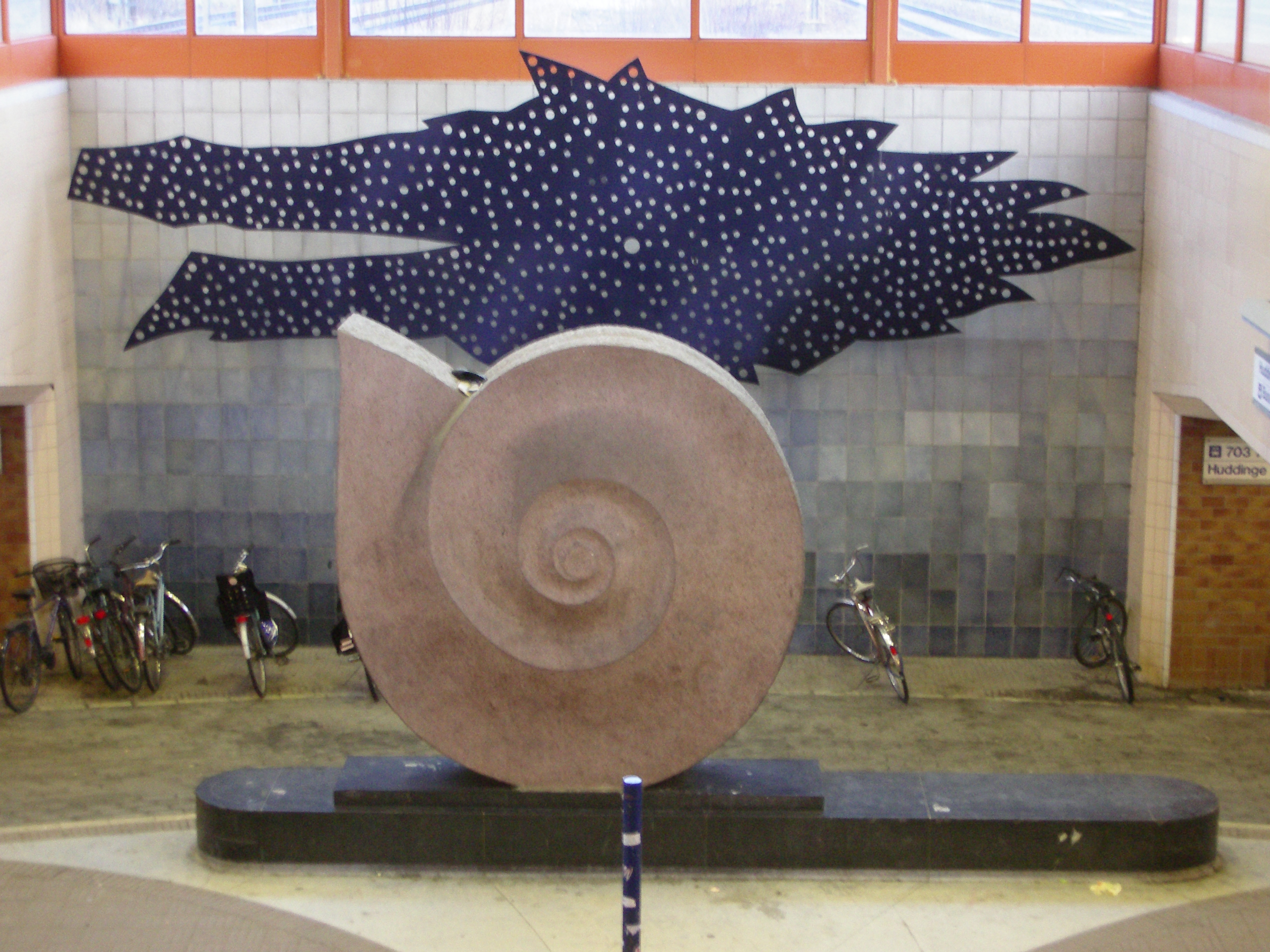
Art by Huddinge Station made by Nils G. Stenqvist called "Du har tid! - Snäckfossil med stjärnsystem".

Huddinge is served by the Stockholm public transport system. There are two stations on the Stockholm Metro and five on the Stockholm commuter rail system as well as large bus network. Some main line trains call at Flemingsberg.

== 2018 Election ==
Elections to Swedish municipalities are held every fourth year on the second Sunday in September. The 2018 election to the 61-seat council resulted in the centre-right Alliance of four parties (M, L, KD and C) plus two local parties (HP and DP) staying in power without a majority. The Alliance and local parties gained a seat since the 2014 election and maintains power. The three Red-Green parties (S, MP and V) are in opposition and the far right Sweden Democrats (SD) holds the balance of power but normally votes with the Alliance.

Polling period	Polling agency	Alliance Parties				Red-Green Parties			Other				Alliance & Local (M, L, C, KD, HD, DP)	R-G (S, MP, V)	SD
Polling period	Polling agency	M	L	C	KD	S	MP	V	SD	HP	DP	Others	Alliance & Local (M, L, C, KD, HD, DP)	R-G (S, MP, V)	SD
2018 Election		24.0%	6.5%	5.6%	4.0%	25.5%	5.3%	8.7%	11.4%	2.8%	5.1%	1.2%	48.5%	39.0%	12.5%
2018 Seats		15	4	4	2	16	3	5	7	2	3	0	30	24	7

== Culture ==
The municipality contains six public libraries, Södertörn University College and one of the campuses for Karolinska Institutet.

Kungens Kurva is one of Sweden's largest shopping areas. It hosts, among other things, the largest IKEA store in the world, the largest cinema in the country, and a large shopping centre. In total, it generates a turnover of 6 billion Swedish kronor and has 15 million visitors per year. Mikael Akerfeldt from Opeth and song writer and pop artist Orup both grew up in Huddinge.

== Sports ==
The most known sports club in Huddinge is the ice hockey club Huddinge IK, which has fostered a long line of well-known Swedish ice hockey players, such as Michael Nylander, Mattias Norström and Kent Johansson, and used to be a regular runner up in the Swedish second division and the qualifications for the Elitserien. Peter Forsberg also happened to make his debut as a senior player with his original club Modo Hockey, facing Huddinge away.

== Twin cities ==
- Lyngby-Taarbæk Municipality, Denmark
- Vantaa, Finland
- Nuuk, Greenland
- Seyðisfjörður, Iceland
- Askim, Norway
