= Kvarnsjön =

Kvarnsjön ("mill lake") can refer to the following lakes in Sweden:

- Kvarnsjön, Gladö in Huddinge Municipality and Botkyrka Municipality
- Kvarnsjön, Lissma in Huddinge Municipality
