= Tyresån lake system =

Lake system in Sweden

Coordinates: 59°14′N 18°10′E

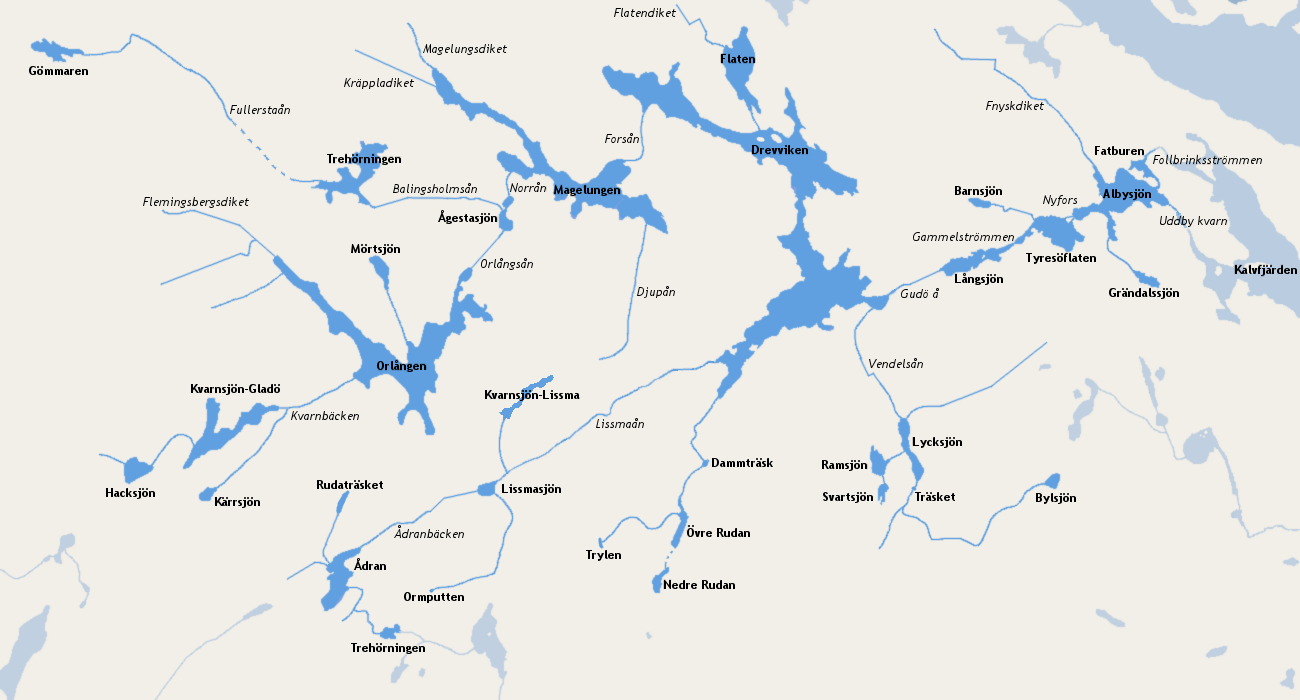

Tyresån Lake System (Swedish: Tyresåns sjösystem) is a number of lakes in Sweden with a common basin of 251.5 km^{2}.

It includes the following thirty lakes:

- Ådran
- Ågestasjön
- Albysjön Barnsjön
- Bylsjön
- Dammträsk
- Drevviken
- Fatburen
- Flaten
- Grändalssjön
- Gömmaren
- Hacksjön
- Kvarnsjön-Gladö
- Kvarnsjön-Lissma
- Kärrsjön
- Lissmasjön
- Lycksjön
- Långsjön
- Magelungen
- Mörtsjön
- Nedre Rudan
- Orlången
- Ormputten
- Övre Rudan
- Ramsjön
- Rudträsket
- Svartsjön
- Trehörningen-Hanveden
- Trehörningen-Sjödalen
- Trylen
- Träsket
- Tyresö-Flaten
