= Flemingsbergsskogen Nature Reserve =

Nature reserve in Stockholm, Sweden

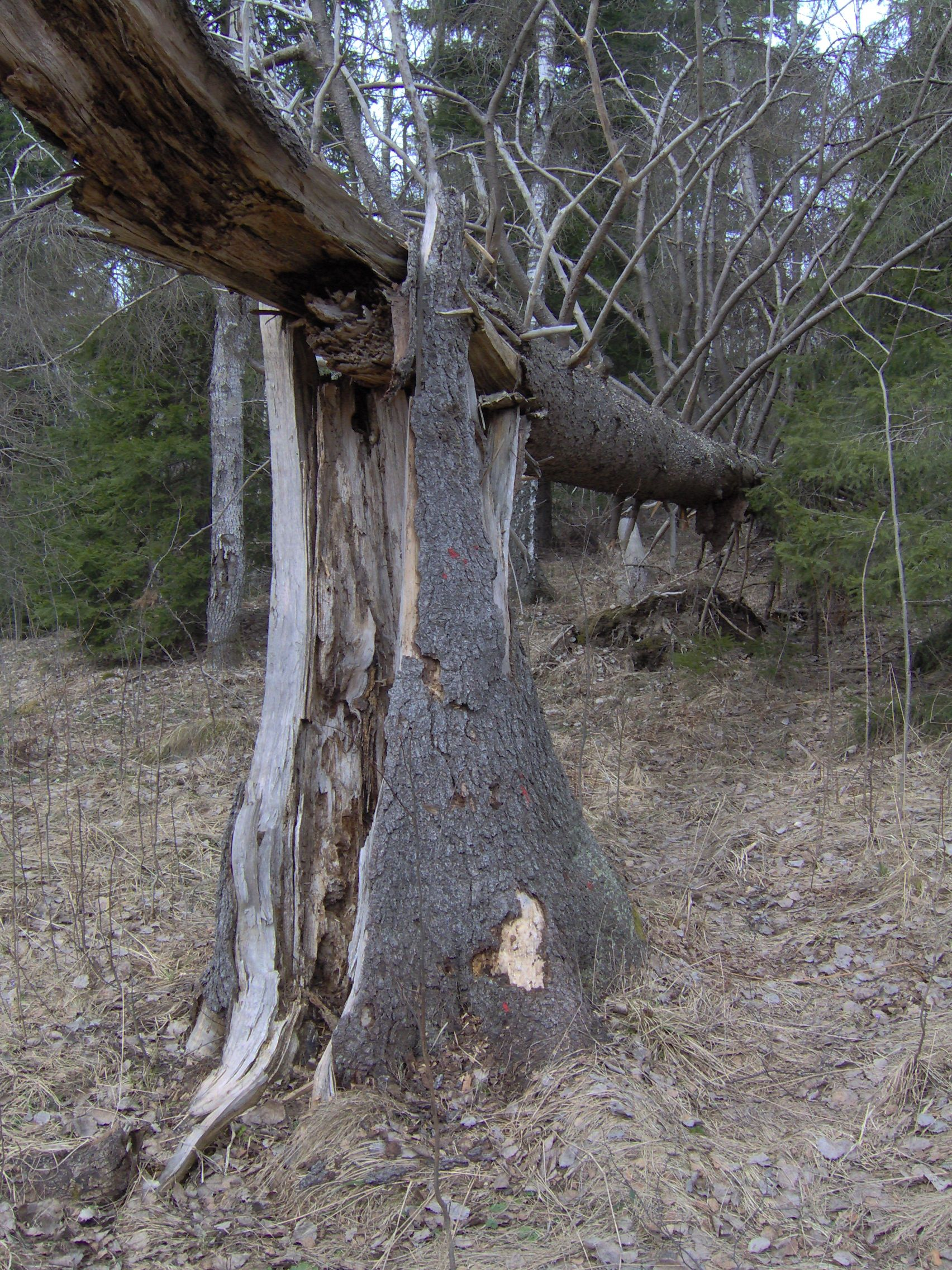
- A storm-felled tree in Flemingsbergsskogen.

- Location within Stockholm Location within Sweden
- Nearest city: Stockholm
- Coordinates: 59°12′20″N 17°57′43″E
- Established: 2006
- Website: Official website

Flemingsbergsskogen Nature Reserve (Swedish: Flemingsbergsskogens naturreservat, literary "Flemingsberg's Forest") is a nature reserve in Huddinge Municipality south of central Stockholm, Sweden.

The reserve was created in 2006 and encompasses some 956 hectares (2,360 acres) of land and 11 hectares (27 acres) of water. It is composed of rocky upland areas with Pine forests and bogs, and nutrient-rich lowland areas with spruce and deciduous forests. On its eastern side it borders to the Orlången Nature Reserve.

== Biodiversity ==
Due to the area's inaccessibility, it has been spared from large-scale forestry which has resulted in a unique biodiversity encompassing some 300 red-listed species dependent of coherent virgin lands. Most notably the Wood Grouse has a permanent presence in the reserve, and as the area is barely sufficient for the species it is regarded as important to maintain or if possible increase the size of the area. Old pasture-lands along the eastern and northern borders of the area adds further to its biodiversity, as do the Reeds in the Flemingsberg Bay (Flemingsbergsviken), the northern inflow of Lake Orlången, which is an important locale for several species of bats. Two historical mines in the area are today filled with water and have become important locales for the rare Great Crested Newt.

== History ==
Several axes from the Stone Age found in the area indicates it was first populated about 7,000–8,000 years ago. Two Iron Age hill forts (500 BCE – 1050 CE) within the reserve are believed to have served as retreats from robbers who frequently entered the Lake Mälaren region from the Baltic Sea to raid the area. The upland location of these forts must have made them beyond reach for enemies who would hardly drag their ships to a location 10–15 metres (33–49 ft) above sea level. The Stensättra Mansion located south-east of the fort, is believed to date to the Viking Age, though the present building was created in the 1820s.

== See also ==
- Geography of Stockholm
