= Trehörningen (Sjödalen) =

Lake in Sjödalen, Huddinge municipality, Sweden

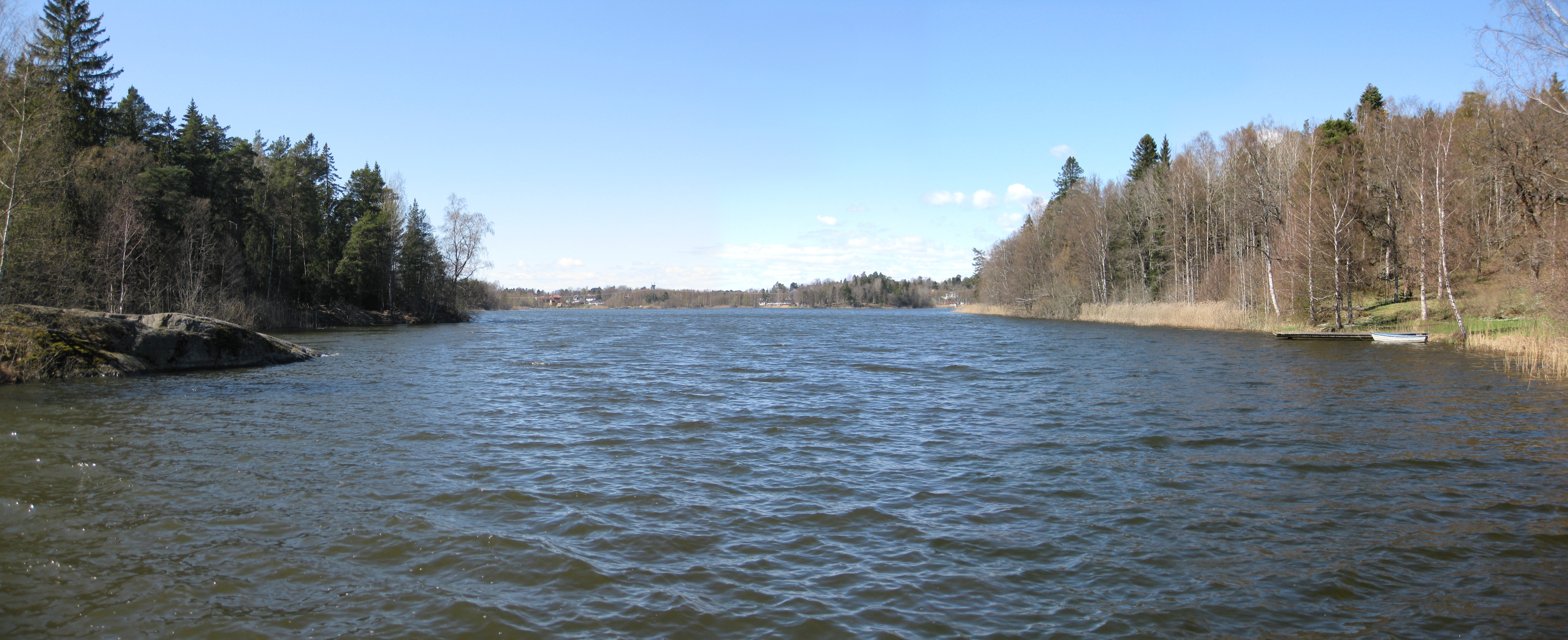

- Location within Stockholm
- Location: Huddinge, Southern Stockholm County
- Coordinates: 59°13′54″N 18°1′18″E
- Primary inflows: Gömmaren via the brooks Solfagradiket and Fullerstaån
- Primary outflows: Ågestasjön
- Catchment area: 17.9 km^{2} (6.9 sq mi)
- Basin countries: Sweden
- Surface area: 62.6 ha (155 acres) (excluding islands); 64.0 ha (158 acres) (including islands)
- Average depth: 1.7 m (5 ft 7 in)
- Max. depth: 3.6 m (12 ft)
- Water volume: 1,090,000 m^{3} (880 acre⋅ft)
- Residence time: 0.27 years
- Shore length^{1}: 7,770 m (25,490 ft) (including islands); 7,040 m (23,100 ft) (excluding islands)
- Surface elevation: 21.5 m (71 ft)
- Islands: 3 (area: 1.4 ha or 3.5 acres)
- Settlements: Huddinge
- ^{1} Shore length is not a well-defined measure.

Trehörningen (Swedish: "The Triangle") is a small lake located in the municipality Huddinge in southern Stockholm, Sweden. As part of the Tyresån Lake System, Trehörningen receives water from Lake Gömmaren and supplies water to Lake Ågesta.

== History ==
The area surrounding Trehörningen, Orlången and Ågestasjön, is a fine example of a historical landscape evolving from a prehistoric settlement into a traditional agricultural village discontinued in the 19th century, encompassing structures from all interjacent eras. It is one of the few areas in Stockholm which escaped the creation of the widespread 20th century suburbs around the historical city of Stockholm, and, consequently, the area is considered as having cultural and historical values of national interest. The landscape include open cultivated and grazed fields next to steep rocks, pine and deciduous forests. Several grave fields, hillforts, and other archaeological structures, reflects the area was connected to the Baltic Sea in prehistoric times. During medieval times, the area contained the only farmstead exempt from land dues (i.e. owned by a member of the Swedish nobility) in Huddinge. In the area traces from the Stone Age and some cairns from the Bronze Age have been found, and parts of the present road network is left unaltered for thousands of years.

== Catchment area ==
Three-fourths of the catchment area is used for settlements, including the commercial centre of Huddinge (Huddinge Centrum) and half a dozen residential neighbourhoods. Nevertheless, the shores of the lakes are of significant recreational importance as they border the Orlången Nature Reserve and contain several cliffs popular for bathing and angling. Both major inflows, Fullerstaån and Solfagradiket, are guided through culverts under neighbouring settlements, but reaches the lake through open ditches. Today, motor-driven boats are not permitted on the lake and restrictions are imposed on angling.

=== Environmental influence ===
The lake used to receive waste water from both settlements and other neighbouring operations 1951–1971, but the inflow is today reduced to stormwater - the old usage still echoing in oxygen depletion and phosphorus release at the lake bottom, and algae bloom and limited water transparency. To restrict future influence to a minimum, reduction in incoming flows are given priority rather than any actions to the lake itself. The lake was dredged in 1975 and 1976, the product of which was pumped over to the lake's western bay where embankments prevent it from pouring back into the lake. Additionally, reed beds were removed and other measures were taken to clean the lake. Vegetation has been cleared annually since.

== Flora and fauna ==
As a locale for birds, the lake was significantly deteriorated by the mid-1970s dredging which caused a colony of black-headed gull to disappear. Today, the lake has a regular presence of mallard, Eurasian coot, great crested grebe, common goldeneye; regular visits of common gull, heron, common merganser, osprey, marsh warbler, great reed-warbler, and grasshopper warbler; and some uncommon guests such as common kingfisher and black-throated diver; the lake itself thus still being of ornithological interest, while the forests surrounding the lake attracts long-tailed tit and lesser spotted woodpecker.

Aquatic plants, in addition to reed and club-rush, includes several species of duckweed and chickenwort. Along the shore are some 30 species of trees and plants, including alder, birch, aspen, spruce, sedges, loosestrife, forget-me-nots, cinquefoils, and water-pepper.

The common frog and common toad have been observed by the lake, as have bats such as the northern bat and Daubenton's bat. No observations of dragonflies had been reported until July 2014, when two American visitors saw a small red dragonfly and a large black dragonfly.

== See also ==
- Geography of Stockholm
- Lakes of Sweden
