= Långsjön, Älvsjö =

Lake in Huddinge, Sweden

Långsjön
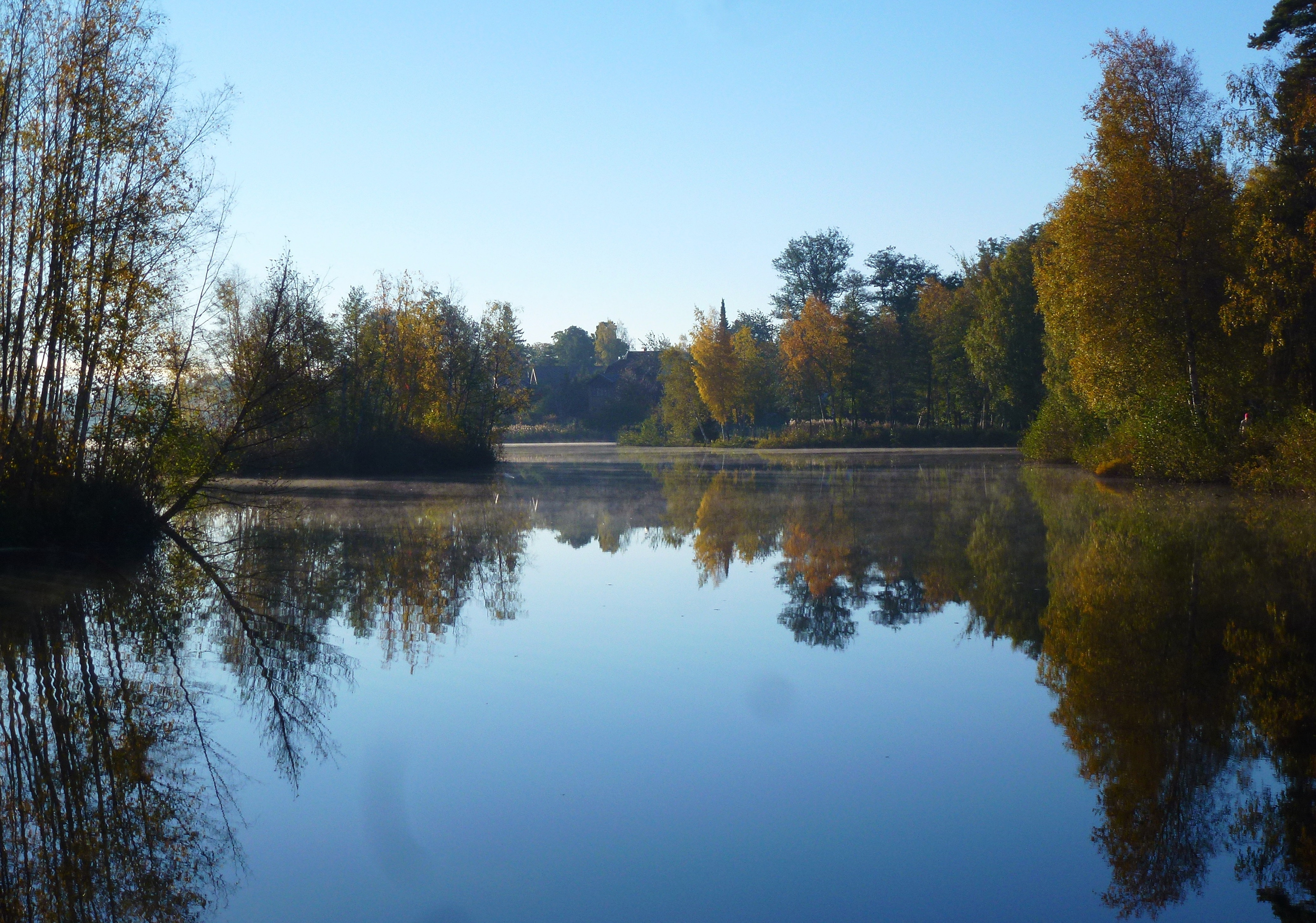
- View looking east

- Location within Stockholm
- Coordinates: 59°16′3″N 17°57′59″E
- Primary outflows: Lake Mälaren
- Catchment area: 243 ha (600 acres)
- Basin countries: Sweden
- Surface area: 29 ha (72 acres)
- Average depth: 2.2 m (7 ft 3 in)
- Max. depth: 3.3 m (11 ft)
- Water volume: 617,000 m^{3} (500 acre⋅ft)
- Residence time: 9-10 months
- Shore length^{1}: 4,940 m (16,210 ft) (including islands)
- Surface elevation: 30.6 m (100 ft)
- Islands: Three (0.17 hectares or 0.42 acres)
- Settlements: Huddinge, Stockholm
- ^{1} Shore length is not a well-defined measure.

Långsjön (English: The Long Lake) is a lake in southern Stockholm, Sweden. The lake is situated in an old residential neighbourhood located between the municipalities of Stockholm and Huddinge and most of the shoreline is private property. The water level is controlled by a sluice in the north-western end of the lake where the lake empties into Lake Mälaren through a system of dikes and culverts. Polluted waste water was poured directly into the lake during the early 20th century which caused up to two-thirds of the lake to be choked-up until the 1940s. It was subsequently one of the first lakes in Stockholm to undergo restoration. The northern shores are waterlogged whilst the bedrock surfaces along the southern. The lake has no major feeders, the inflow instead coming from local stormwater and surface runoff.

== Catchment area ==
Some 60 per cent of the lake catchment area is occupied by settlements, mostly one-family houses but several minor green spaces are scattered around the lake. South-west of the lake is a small area forming part of the Gömmaren nature reserve. The lake has two bathes.

=== Environmental influence ===
The number of polluting operations in the catchment area is limited to a petrol station and an engineering workshop. In the end of the 1930s sewers were built in the area and the waste water fed into the lake during the 1920s and 1930s is today brought to the wastewater treatment works at Henriksdal, but old sewers still leak into the lake and the water was considered unfit for bathing at several occasions during the 1990s. Långsjön is one of few lakes in Stockholm where spillway overflow adds appreciable amounts of phosphorus. Surface runoff adds some 70 kg of phosphorus and 1,000 kg of nitrogen annually and more than half of phosphorus added through surface water is produced by the surrounding one-family houses and their gardens.

== Flora and fauna ==
In August, the stock of phytoplankton is dominated by cyanobacteria and green algae, of which several are potentially poisonous and caused major algae blooms during the 1990s. The community of zooplankton is representative for lakes rich in nutrients with medium-sized taxa dominating in late spring and June, while minor taxa are otherwise prevailing. Larger zooplankton, such as cyclopoid copepods, are rare and reaches about 40 per cent in July and August.

No inventory of aquatic plants has been done since the mid-1970s, but white waterlily is common in the minor bays. yellow water-lily occur in minor numbers but reed beds are missing.

Lake bed fauna includes more than 50 species dominated by freshwater gastropods (Hippeutis complanatus), Caddisflies (Somatochlora metallica), beetles, and leeches (Alboglossiphonia heteroclita). Additionally, in 1969 a freshwater jellyfish (Craspedacusta sowerbii) was documented in the lake, a continental species then new to Sweden but not found in the lake since.

Fishes natural to Långsjön include perch, northern pike, roach, rudd, carp bream, crucian carp, tench, and ruffe; extraneous species are common carp and mirror carp. Pike and zander are planted-out carnivorous species while roach and crucian carp have been decimated by trawling. Sample catches in 1999 showed the number of perch, roach, and carp had increased far beyond expected levels. Crayfish plague hit the lake in 1984, but the signal crayfish was reintroduced within a few years.

The lake is a breeding ground for most birds common to the Stockholm-area — such as mute swan, mallard, and Eurasian coot — and some less common — such as common moorhen and great crested grebe. Other bird sightings include heron, tufted duck, common tern, pochard, and spotted crake.

The lake is one of the most important breeding grounds for amphibians, with a documented presence of common frog, common toad and smooth newt.

== See also ==
- Geography of Stockholm
- Lakes of Sweden
