= Mörtsjön =

Lake in Huddinge Municipality, Sweden

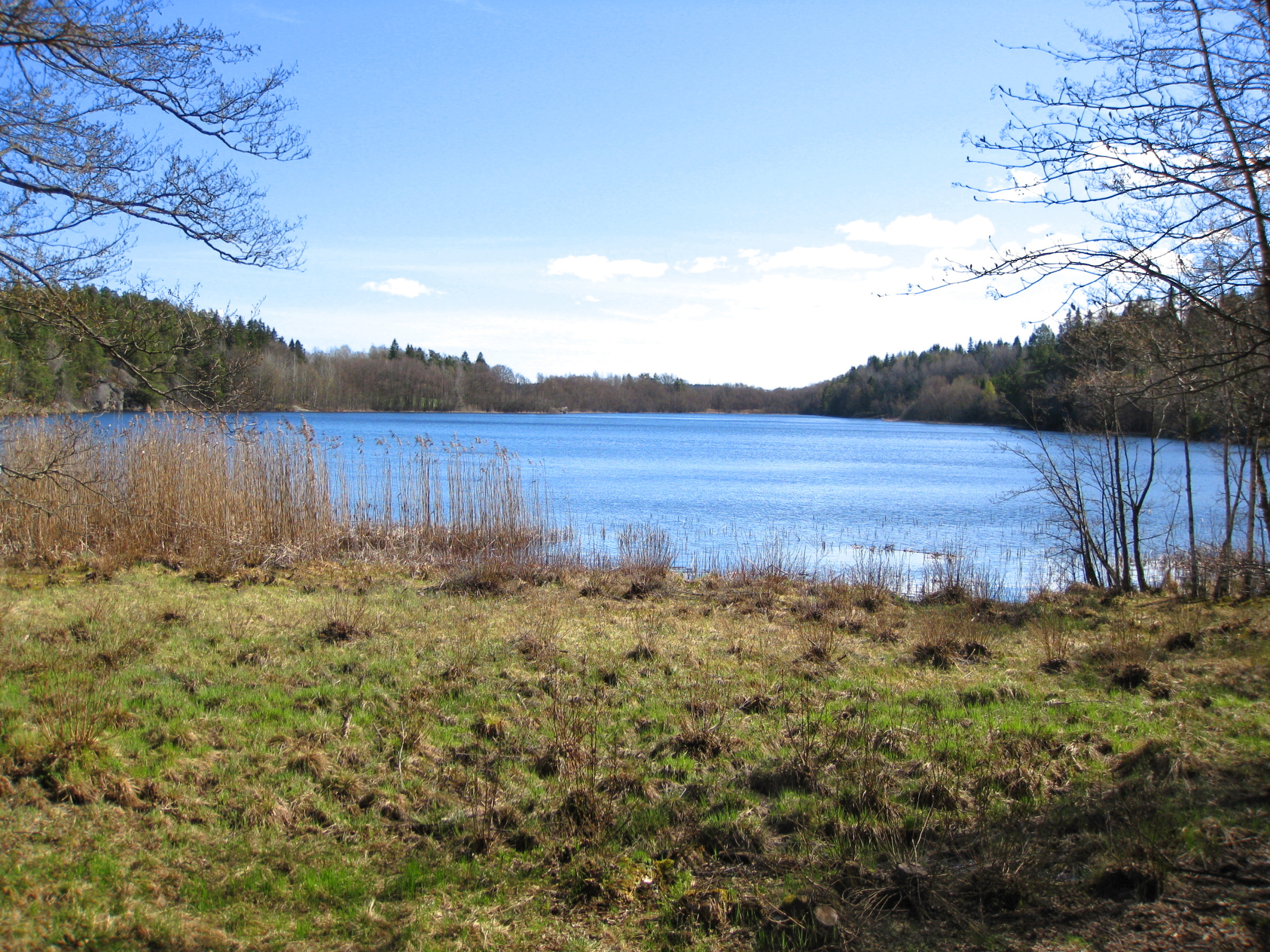

- Location within Stockholm
- Coordinates: 59°12′50″N 18°01′54″E
- Primary outflows: Orlången
- Catchment area: 1.3 km^{2} (0.50 sq mi)
- Basin countries: Sweden
- Surface area: 14.9 ha (37 acres)
- Average depth: 1.9 m (6 ft 3 in)
- Max. depth: 2.3 m (7 ft 7 in)
- Water volume: 281,000 m^{3} (228 acre⋅ft)
- Residence time: < 1 year
- Shore length^{1}: 2,100 m (6,900 ft)
- Surface elevation: 22.78 m (74.7 ft)
- Settlements: Huddinge
- ^{1} Shore length is not a well-defined measure.

Mörtsjön (Swedish for "Roach Lake") is a small lake in Huddinge Municipality, south of Stockholm in Sweden. Part of the Orlången Nature Reserve, Mörtsjön is also one of the smaller lakes of the Tyresån Lake System,

== Catchment area ==
Prince Eugen painted some of his well-known romantic landscapes by the lake in the late 19th century. The homestead Charlottendal on the north-eastern corner of the lake is surrounded by old agricultural land where inorganic fertilisers and pesticides have never been used, and, as a consequence, contains many rare species, such as common rockrose, dithering-grass and scarlet waxy cap. The lush landscape around the lake makes it popular for walking, bathing, fishing, and other open-air activities.

=== Environmental impact ===
The shallow lake is eutrophic. Levels of phosphorus are relatively high, while levels of nitrogen are normal. There are very few human structures in the catchment area, why most of nutrients reaching the lake stems from the surrounding forests. Clearfelling in the end of the 1970s caused increased levels of nitrogen in the lake over the following years and ensuing fish kill probably caused by algal bloom. The shallowness of the lake still tends to cause a shortage of oxygen, which during winters can suffocate fishes.

== Flora and fauna ==
an inventory of aquatic plants in 1998 resulted in the following list: reed, club-rush, narrow-leafed cattail, water horsetail, wood club-rush, greater spearwort, yellow iris, water hemlock, water-plantain, marsh cinquefoil, marsh-bedstraw, bog-bean, yellow water-lily, white water-lily, broad-leaved pondweed, curled pondweed, bladderwort, and Fontinalis moss.

The lake is a natural habitat for northern pike, perch, roach, rudd, tench, and crucian carp. More than 100 individual mirror carps and scale carps were introduced in 1993. Crayfish plague struck the lake in 1979, but since then the signal crayfish has been introduced.

Common birds are mallard, goldeneye, and gull, while heron, merganser, and osprey regularly seek food by the lake among grey willow and goat willow. Aspen, and alder are standing by the shores of the lake, long-tailed tit and lesser spotted woodpecker are present. Other rare species frequently visit the lake, for example the black-throated diver.

Mammals found by the lake include: mink, several bats such as northern bat, common noctule, soprano pipistrelle, and whiskered bat. Additionally, some of the species of amphibians and dragonflies common in the Stockholm area are present by the lake.

== See also ==
- Geography of Stockholm
