= Gömmaren =

Lake in Huddinge municipality, Sweden

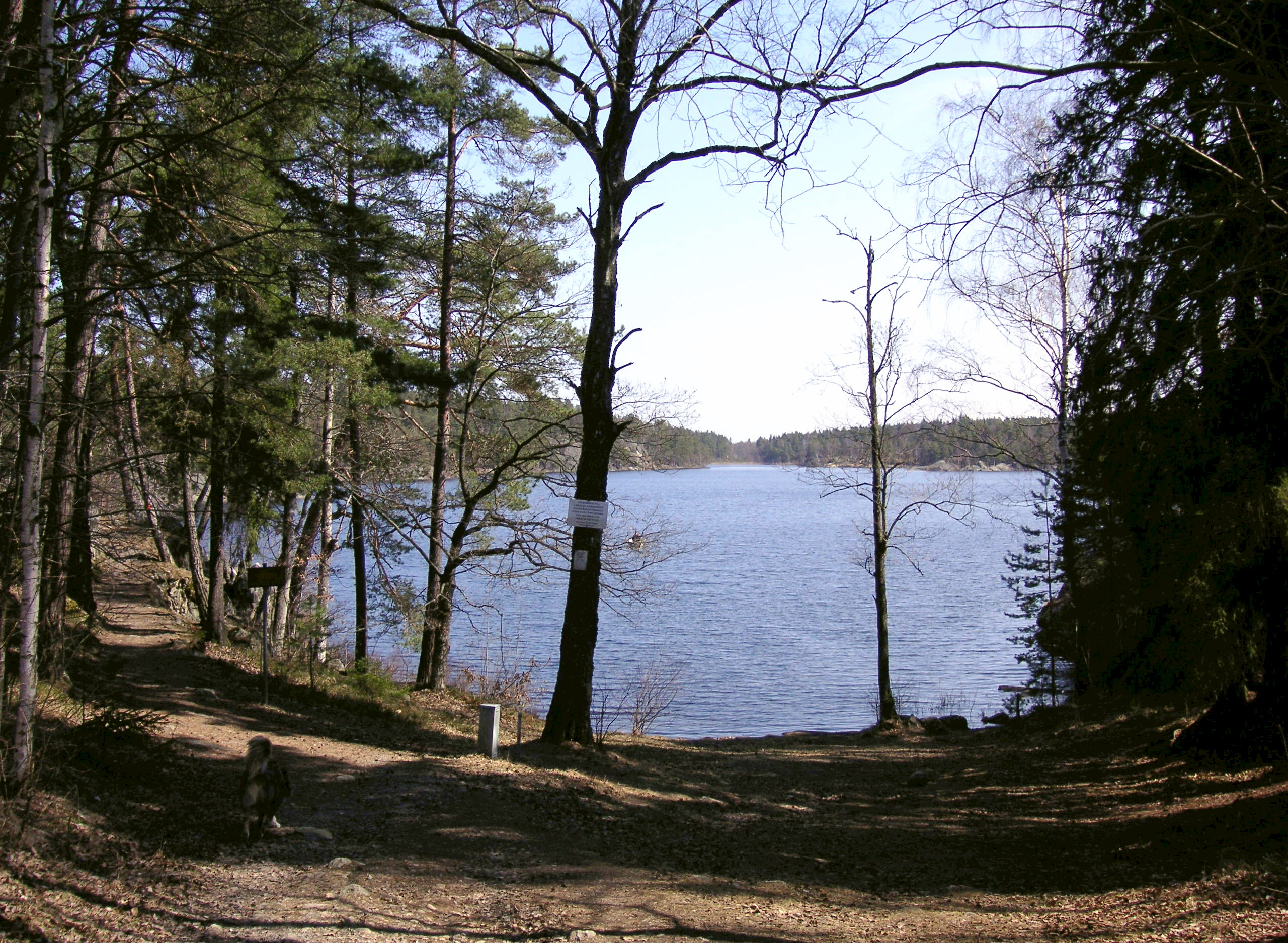

- Location within Stockholm
- Coordinates: 59°15′10″N 17°55′7″E
- Primary inflows: Precipitation, local stormwater
- Primary outflows: Trehörningen via the brook Fullerstaån and Mälaren via the brook Gömmarbäcken.
- Catchment area: 2.0 km^{2} (0.77 sq mi)
- Basin countries: Sweden
- Surface area: 21.0 ha (52 acres)
- Average depth: 3.4 m (11 ft)
- Max. depth: 5.6 m (18 ft)
- Water volume: 724,000 m^{3} (587 acre⋅ft)
- Residence time: 1.9 yrs
- Shore length^{1}: 4,100 m (13,500 ft) (including island); 4,030 m (13,220 ft) (excluding island)
- Surface elevation: 46.15 m (151.4 ft)
- Islands: 1 (0.02 ha or 2,200 sq ft)
- Settlements: Glömsta, Huddinge
- ^{1} Shore length is not a well-defined measure.

Gömmaren (Swedish: literary "The Hider") is a small lake located in the municipality Huddinge in southern Stockholm, Sweden. It is the easternmost lake in the Tyresån Lake System.

The lake empties to the west through Gömmarbäcken ("Gömmaren Rill") and to the east through Fullerstaån ("Fullersta Stream"), which is further downstream guided in culverts under the commercial centre of Huddinge (Huddinge Centrum) before flowing south-east to empty into Lake Trehörningen. Motorboats are not allowed on the lake. Its clear water makes it popular for various open-air activities such as angling and bathing in summer, and skating in winters as it is one of the first lakes in Huddinge to freeze. Bathing from cliffs surrounding the lake is popular, but a sand beach is also available. A local fishing society (Långsjön-Gömmarens Fiskevårdsförening) manages lake conservation and supplies the general public with fishing permits.

== History ==
Notwithstanding the lake's name, documented from the 18th century and most likely hinting at the hidden away location, settlements have been present near the lake since the Stone Age. The property of Vårby Gård, a nearby homestead, used to reach the lake in the 18th century, but the central building burnt down in 1975 and none of its gardens, brewing, bakery, smithy, or poultry houses are left.

== Catchment area ==
The lake is located in a forest forming part of the Gömmaren Nature Reserve created in 1995 and as such is considered as important for recreation and nature conservation, a popular destination both for lovers of open-air life and for schools.

=== Environmental influence ===
The water of the lake is very clear and virtually colourless, which reflects the nutrient-poor flat rock pine forest of the surrounding area. Settlements south of the lake provide most of the nutrient contribution to the lake and about 80 per cent of the phosphorus input. A hydrogeological examination in 1985 showed the surrounding soil is poorly fit to take up increased levels of waste water. Acidification has been neutralized by liming which has produced excellent pH-levels.

== Flora and fauna ==
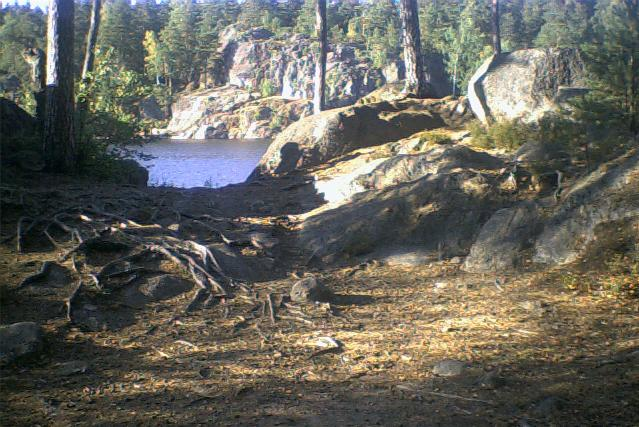
Cliffs and roots by Lake Gömmaren.

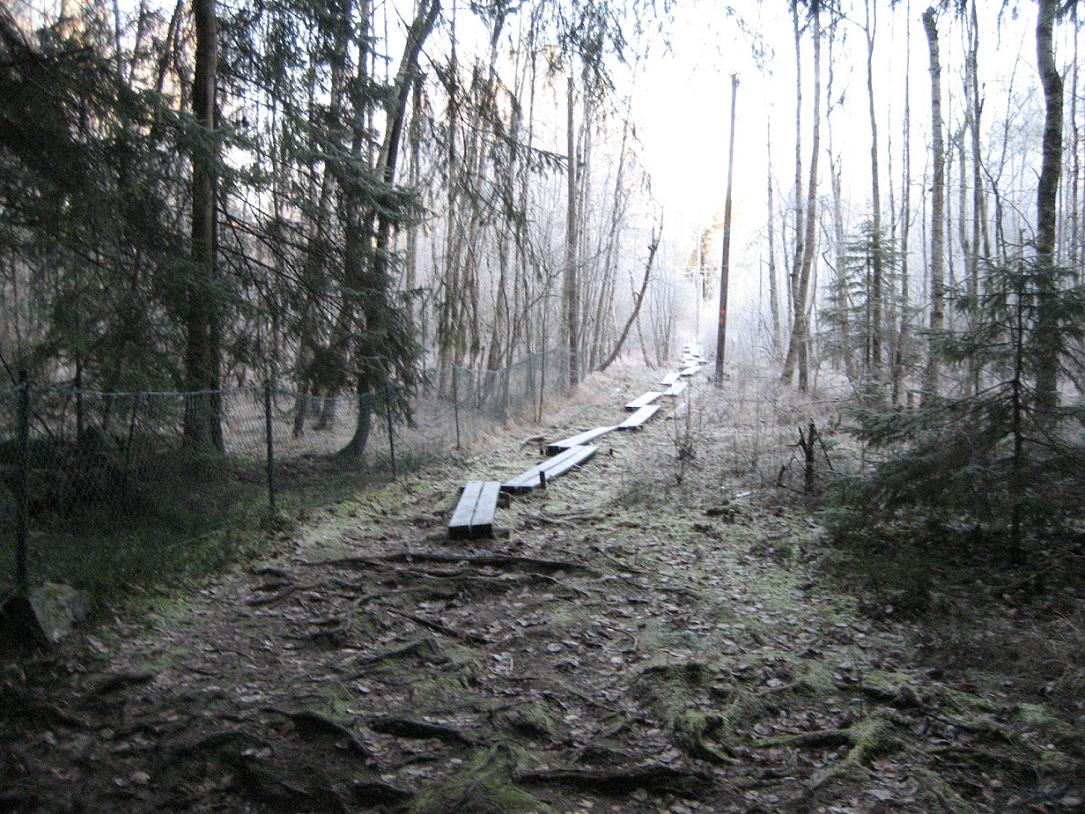
The swampy forest surrounding the lake attracts many visitors.

Many species of aquatic plants are present in the lake: reed, common club-rush, water horsetail, narrow leaf cattail, white beak-sedge, gypsywort, bulbous rush, white waterlily, broad-leaved pondweed, alternate water-milfoil, and intermediate bladderwort. Along the shores are grey willow, goat willow, aspen, black alder, bog-myrtle, tall bog-sedge, common sedge, bottle sedge, slender sedge, cranberry, and round-leaved sundew.

Fish species native to the lake include northern pike, perch, roach, and, to some degree, rudd. There are many introduced species such as rainbow trout, North American brook trout, trout, and the hybrid species splake making the lake well-attended by anglers during both summers and winters. Crayfish plague eliminated the population of noble crayfish in 1987, but some 1200 signal crayfish were introduced in the early 1990s.

Common birds are mallard and common gull, but other species such as common goldeneye, common tern, and a couple of black-throated diver breed by the lake, and heron and osprey feed in the area. Trees by the lake shores also attract long-tailed tit and lesser spotted woodpecker, and occasionally whooper swan, and great crested grebe are reported by the lake.

Additionally, many species of dragonflies have been reported but no inventory of bats has been made.
