= Vidja =

- Location within Stockholm Location within Sweden Location within European Union
- Coordinates: 59°12′N 18°04′E
- Country: Sweden
- Province: Södermanland
- County: Stockholm County
- Municipality: Huddinge Municipality

Area
  - Total: 1.74 km^{2} (0.67 sq mi)

Population (31 December 2020)
  - Total: 882
  - Density: 507/km^{2} (1,310/sq mi)
- Time zone: UTC+1 (CET)
  - Summer (DST): UTC+2 (CEST)

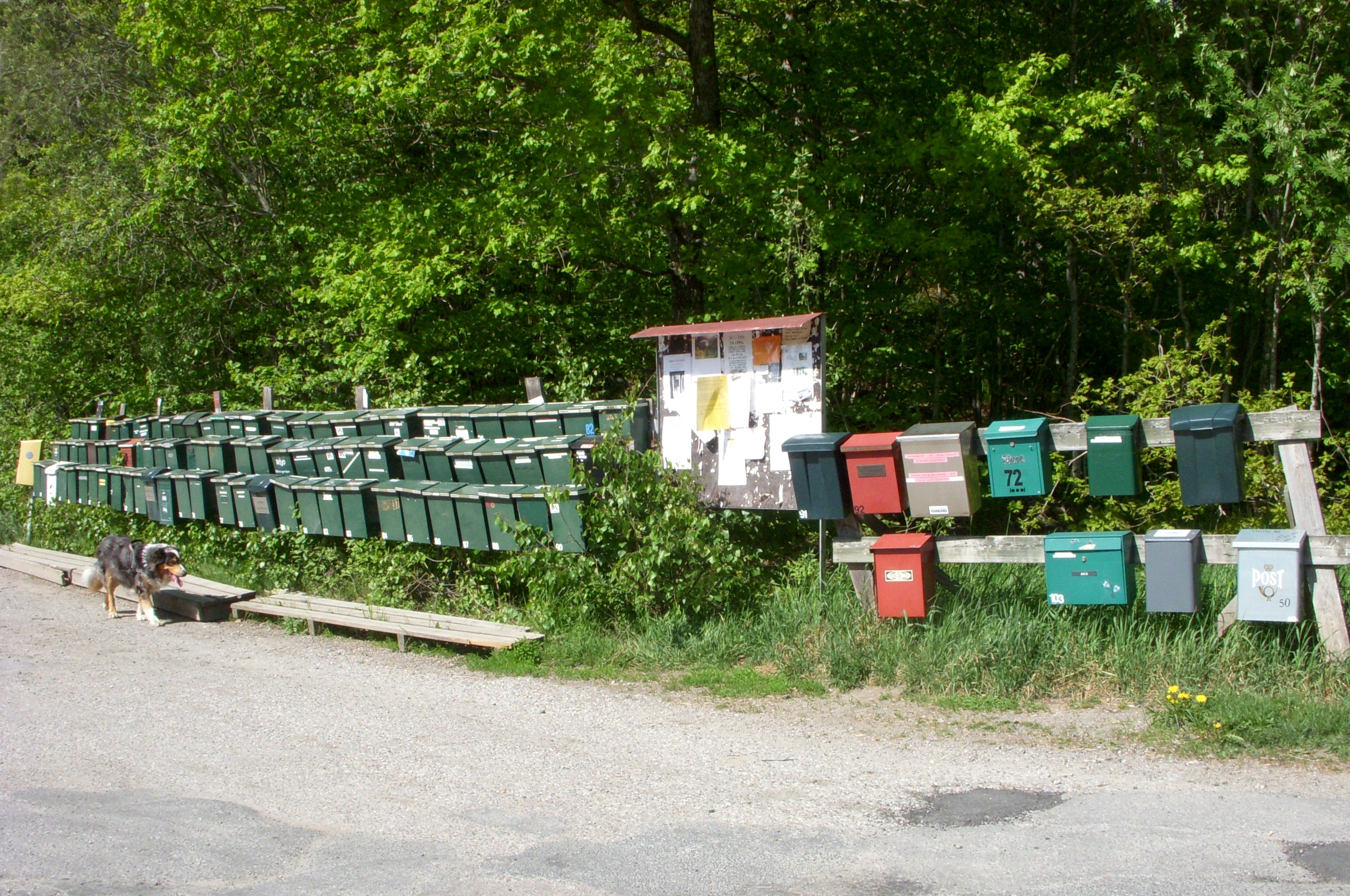

Vidja is a locality situated in Huddinge Municipality, Stockholm County, Sweden with 682 inhabitants in 2010.
