= Kvarnsjön, Lissma =

Lake in Huddinge Municipality, Sweden

Kvarnsjön
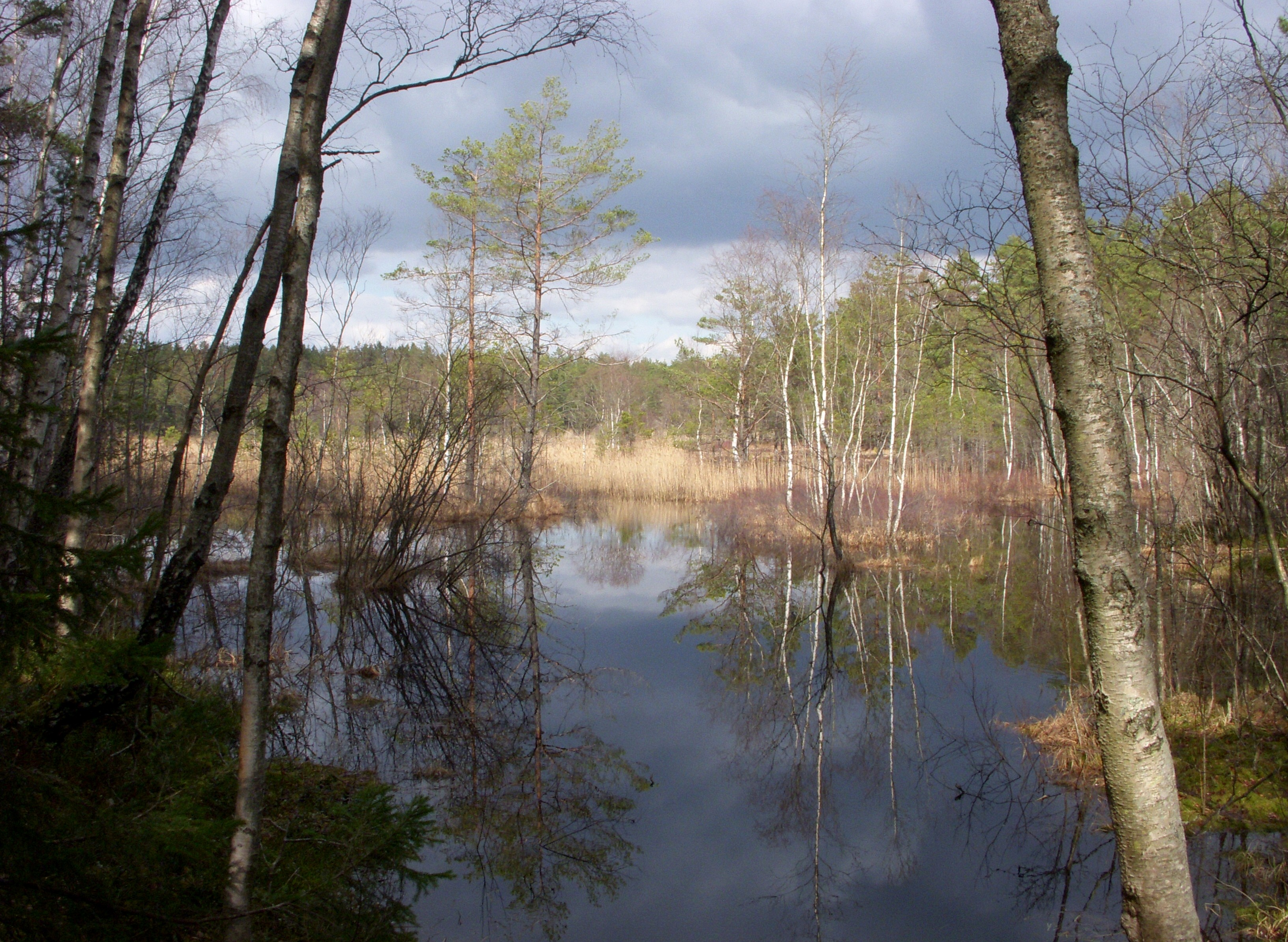

- Location within Stockholm
- Location: Huddinge Municipality
- Coordinates: 59°11′34″N 18°4′51″E
- Basin countries: Sweden
- Surface area: 0.145 km^{2} (0.056 sq mi)
- Max. depth: 1.7 m (5 ft 7 in)
- Surface elevation: 51.4 m (169 ft)

Kvarnsjön is a long narrow lake at Lissma in Huddinge Municipality, Södermanland. The surrounding land is part of Tyresån's main catchment area. The lake is 1.7 meters deep, covers an area of 0.145 square kilometers and is 51.4 meters above sea level. Kvarnsjön is situated in Kvarnsjön Natura 2000 area. During test fishing, perch and pike have been caught in the lake.

Kvarnsjön is surrounded mainly by lean pine woodland and marshland. It drains south through a dam and an old mill pond to Lissmaån and then on to Drevviken. Kvarnsjön is part of the Tyresån lake system.

The lake's outlet goes to Lake Lissma and used to be used as an energy source for Lissma mill (called Kvarntorpet or Täppan). After the mill, low walls of chipped gray stone blocks remain on either side of the stream. Above these is an old wooden bridge (RAÄ number Huddinge 203: 1). The lake is part of the Tyresån lake system and lies within the Lännaskogens nature reserve. The mill has lent its name to Lissma Kvarntorp, a residential area consisting of holiday homes and permanent housing.
