= Lycksjön =

Lake in Sweden

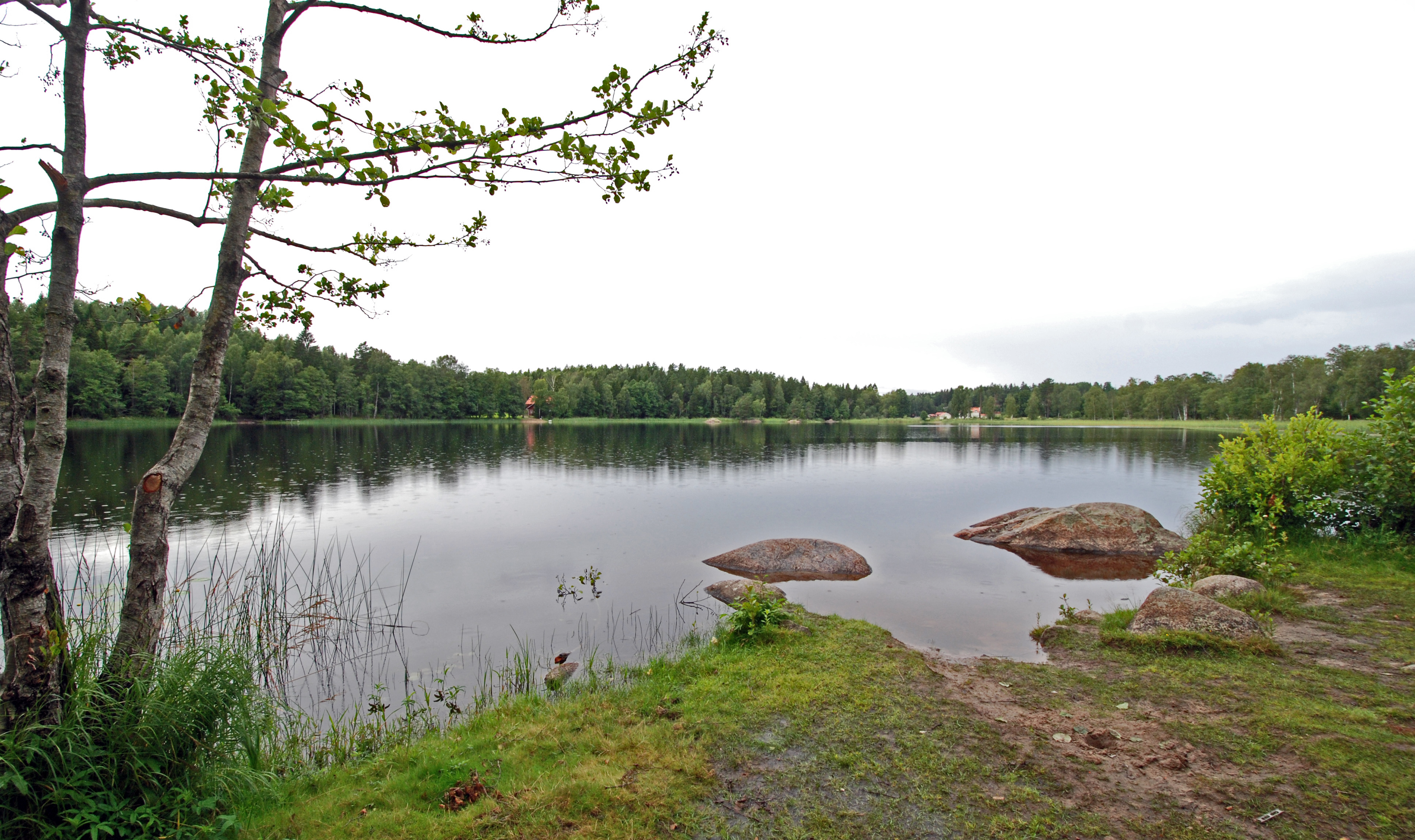
- View of Lycksjön
- Interactive map of Lycksjön
- Coordinates: 59.183611°N 18.211111°E
- Primary outflows: Vendelsån
- Basin countries: Sweden
- Max. length: 1.3 km (0.81 mi)
- Max. width: 0.24 km (0.15 mi)
- Surface area: 0.192 km^{2} (0.074 sq mi)
- Average depth: 4.1 m (13 ft)
- Max. depth: 12.4 m (41 ft)
- Water volume: 860,000 m^{3} (700 acre⋅ft)
- Shore length^{1}: 2.84 km (1.76 mi)
- Surface elevation: 22.3 m (73 ft)
- ^{1} Shore length is not a well-defined measure.

Lycksjön is a lake in Haninge Municipality in Stockholm County, Södermanland, Sweden. It is bordered to the east by Tyresta National Park and is inside the main catchment area of the Tyresån lake system. The lake is 12.4 metres (41 ft) deep, with a surface area of 0.192 square kilometres (0.074 sq mi).
