= Gömmaren Nature Reserve =

Nature reserve in Stockholm, Sweden

Coordinates: 59°15′21″N 17°55′35″E

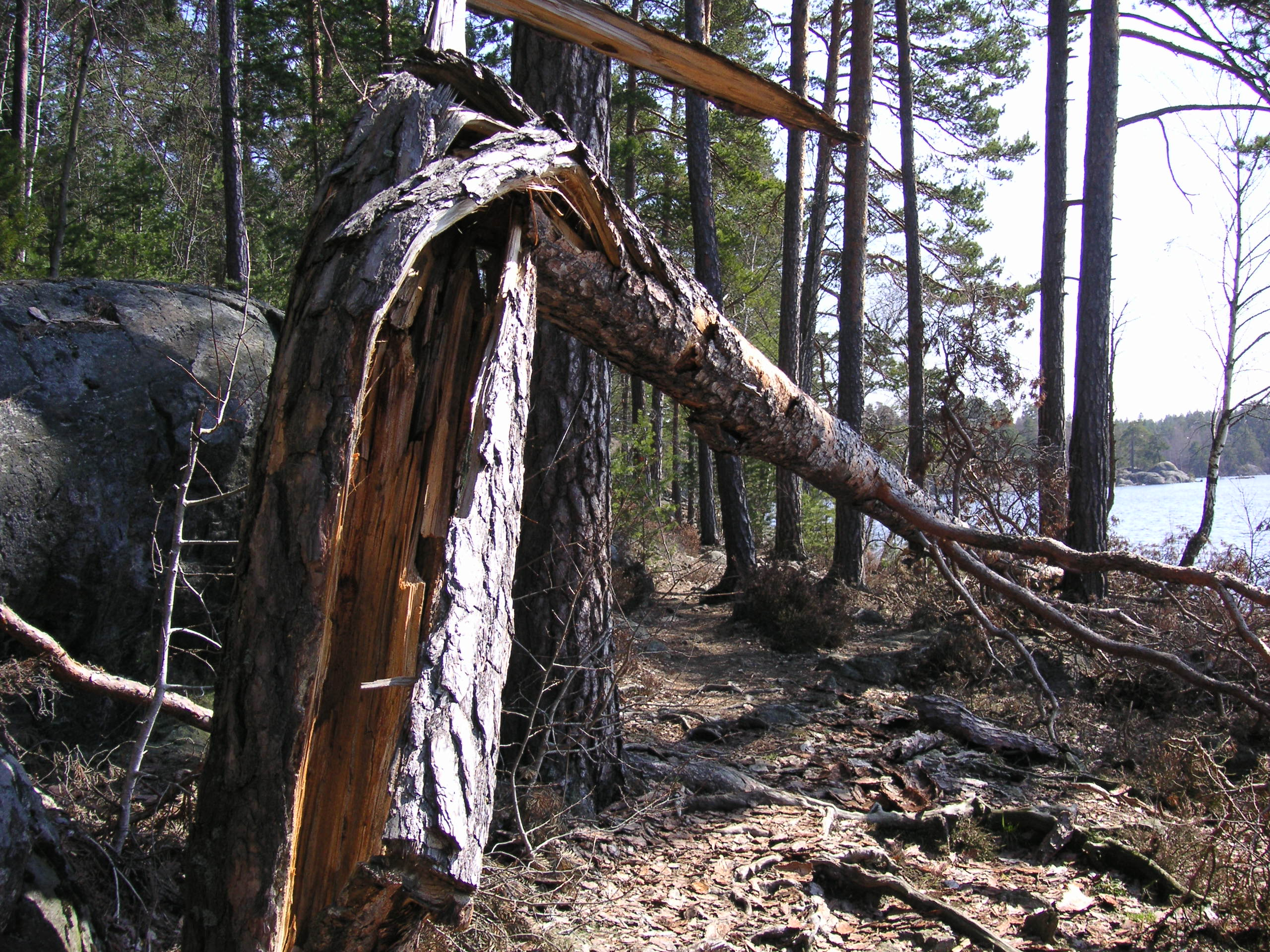
Gömmaren Nature Reserve

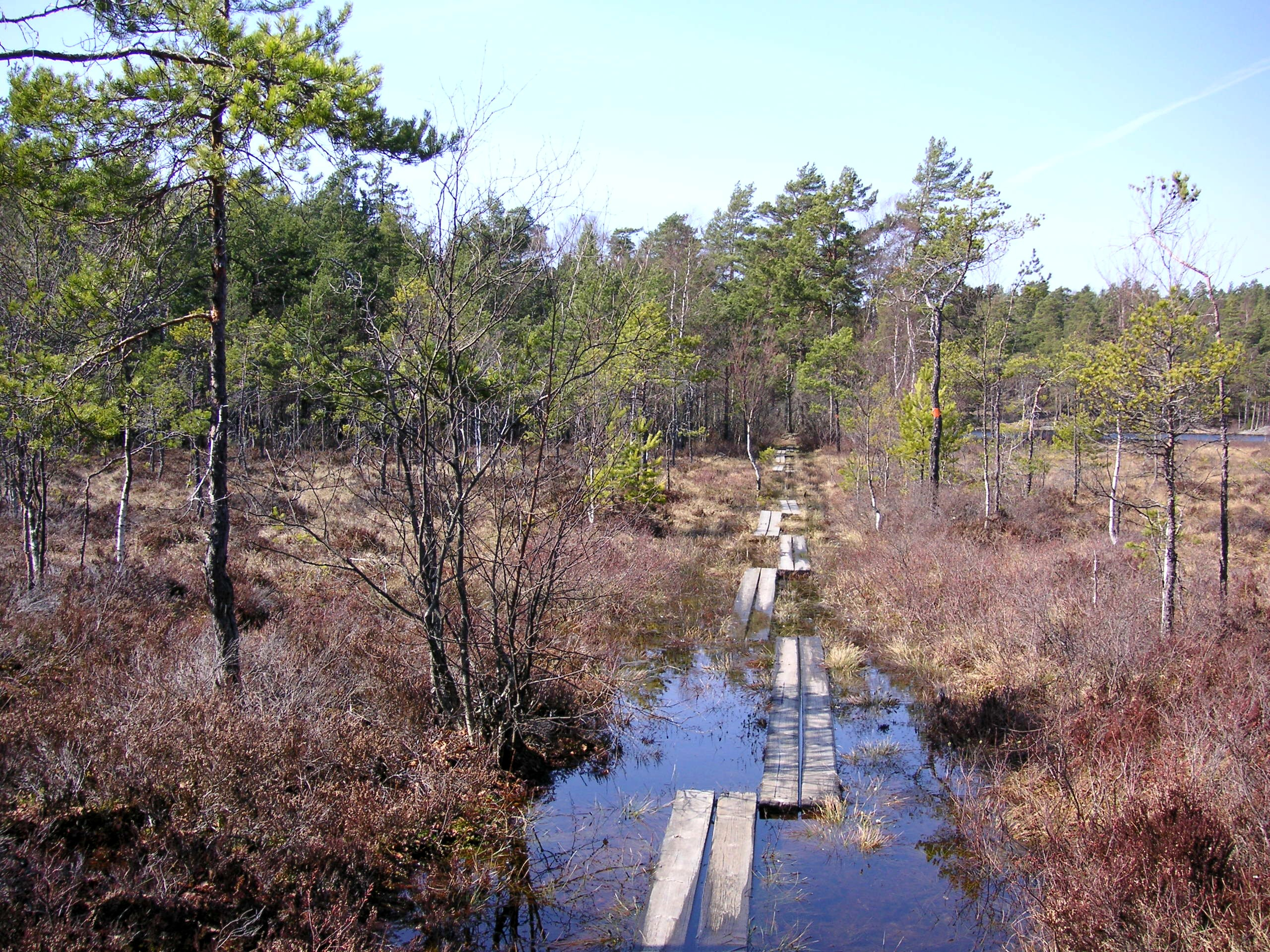
Gömmaren Nature Reserve

Gömmaren Nature Reserve (Swedish: Gömmarens naturreservat) is a nature reserve centred on Lake Gömmaren in the north of Huddinge Municipality south of central Stockholm, Sweden. The reserve was created in 1995.

Encompassing some 660 ha of land and 20 ha of water, the Gömmaren area is a large forest separating the residential areas Vårby, Skärholmen, Segeltorp, Snättringe, Fullersta, and Glömsta. Dozens of schools bordering the area are using it in their education, and the large number of paths criss-crossing it tittle-tattles its long popularity. Lake Gömmaren is very popular for bathing and angling.

The narrow rift valleys running across the area are filled with either mud, which made them suitable for agriculture, or bogs. Notwithstanding the many traces of an old agricultural landscape dating back to the 17th century, large parts of the forest were felled more recently which makes most of the forest young. Several remains of charcoal stacks and windmills reminds of the three historical homesteads in the area where charcoal was being produced.

The area north-west of one of these homesteads, Fullersta kvarn ("Fullersta Mill") and the Gömmaren Brook (Gömmarbäcken) is declared a Natura 2000 area because of its biodiversity and the many rare species growing there, including vascular plants such as Great Meadow-grass and Remote Sedge, and mosses such as Hylocomium umbratum and Trichocolea tomentella. More common species in the area are Alder and Spruce. Additionally, the Fullersta kvarn area houses many valuable lichens, molluscs, birds, amphibians, reptiles, and mammals. The EU decided to protect the area much because the presence of the rare moss species Buxbaumia viridis and Plagiothecium latebricola.

== See also ==
- Geography of Stockholm
