= Orlången Nature Reserve =

Nature reserve in Stockholm, Sweden

Coordinates: 59°12′57.06″N 18°2′5.75″E

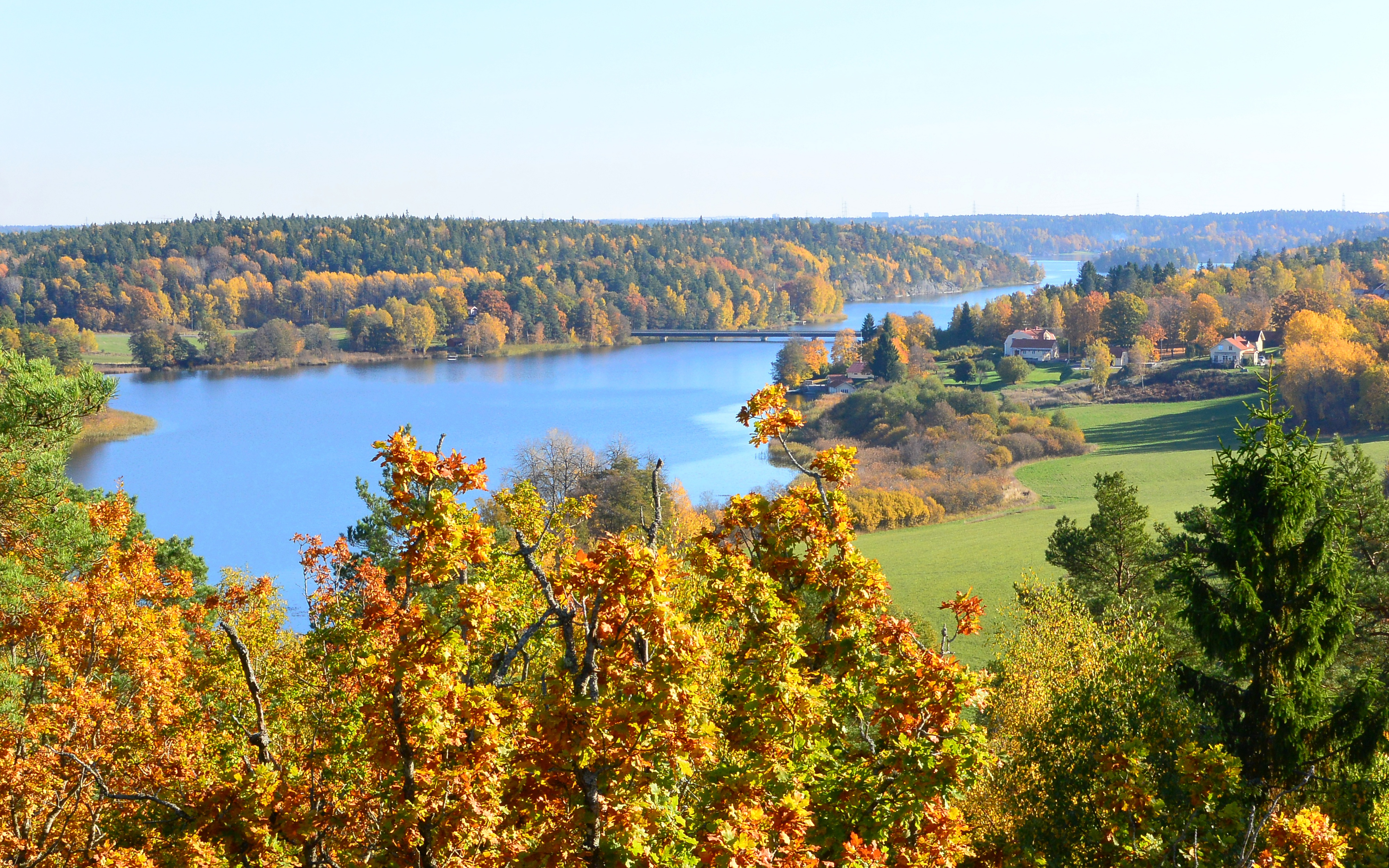
View of Orlången from Stensättra archipelago in Huddinge

Orlången Nature Reserve (Orlångens naturreservat) is a nature reserve surrounding Lake Orlången in central Huddinge Municipality, south of Stockholm, Sweden.

== Description ==
The reserve, founded in 1998, encompasses a total area of 15 square kilometres, of which 12 km² is land dominated by a system of rift valleys characteristic for South Stockholm. The central part of the reserve is dominated by old agricultural lands and pastures, with preserved mansions and homesteads dating back to the 18th century. There are four lakes within the reserve: Trehörningen, Ågestasjön, Orlången, and Mörtsjön. Lake Ågestasjön in the north-eastern end of the reserve is one of the most important bird resting locales and breeding grounds in Stockholm County. Throughout the reserve there are a multitude of rare flora and fauna, making it important for regional biodiversity.

== Other sources ==
- "Orlångens naturreservat" (in Swedish). Huddinge Municipality. (Including a simple map showing the extent of the nature reserve.)
