= Orlången =

Lake in Huddinge Municipality, Sweden

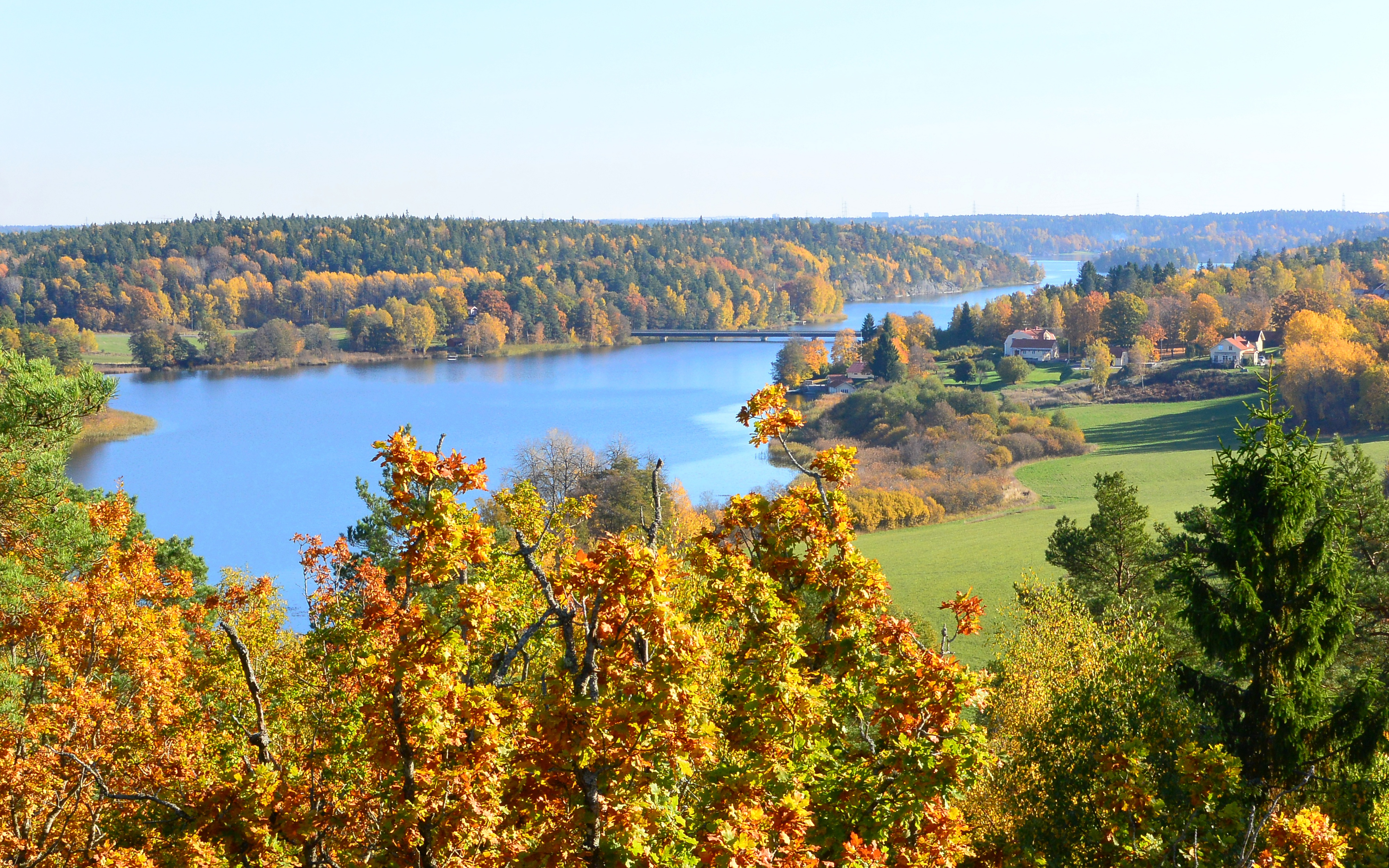

- Location within Stockholm
- Coordinates: 59°11′48″N 18°02′28″E
- Primary inflows: Mörtsjön, Kärrsjön, Kvarnsjön
- Primary outflows: Ågestasjön
- Catchment area: 42.4 km^{2} (16.4 sq mi)
- Basin countries: Sweden
- Surface area: 2.740 km^{2} (1.058 sq mi)
- Average depth: 4.4 m (14 ft)
- Max. depth: 10.2 m (33 ft)
- Water volume: 12.3×10^{6} m^{3} (10,000 acre⋅ft)
- Residence time: 1.33 years
- Shore length^{1}: 24,960 m (81,890 ft) (including islands); 23,770 (excluding islands)
- Surface elevation: 20.8 m (68 ft)
- Islands: 7
- Settlements: Huddinge
- ^{1} Shore length is not a well-defined measure.

Orlången is a lake in central Huddinge Municipality, just south of Stockholm, Sweden.

Orlången, one of the lakes in the Tyresån Lake System, forms part of the Orlången Nature Reserve.

== Catchment area ==
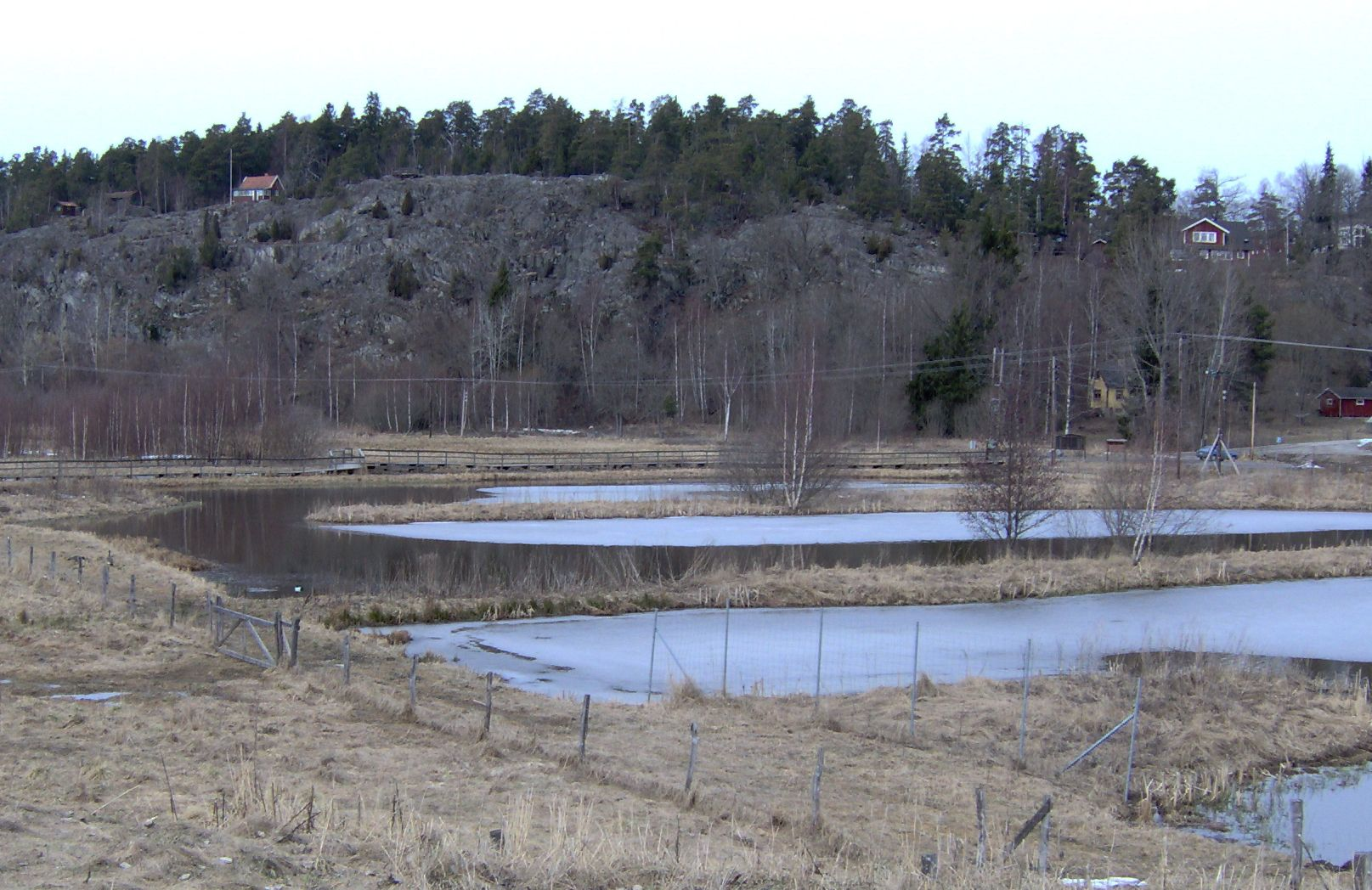
Meandering waters at the wetland purifying facility north of the lake.

The catchment area is composed of criss-crossing fractured valleys with alternating agricultural lands and forests. The lake and its shores are highly popular for open-air activities such as fishing, bathing, birdwatching, tour skating, canoeing, skiing, and walking. The Bottnen ("The Bottom") wetland near the inflow from Mörtsjön is an important bird locale. There are several public baths by the lake, but its many cliffs are also popular spots to spend a summer day. Approximately half of the lake is available for angling for people with the required angling card.

=== Environmental impact ===
Though the mud-filled valleys surrounding Orlången originally made it moderately eutrophic, extended accumulation of nutrients from neighbouring populated areas has made it highly eutrophic. The deepest areas of the lake are depleted of oxygen during both winters and summers, which can indicate that internal loads are worsening the situation; the lake is possibly self-fertilising, as nutrients are released from its sediments. The present discharge of phosphorus, mostly deriving from three residential areas by the lake, is still too high although it remains controllable.

== Flora and fauna ==
Aquatic plants includes reed, club-rush, wood club-rush, broadleaf cattail, flowering rush, water hemlock, yellow iris, yellow loosestrife, bittersweet, yellow water-lily, white water-lily, broad-leaved pondweed, red pondweed, whorled water-milfoil, amphibious bistort, water-soldier, frogbit, duckweed, greater bladderwort, and greater duckweed. Along the shores of the lake are hybrid crack willow, alder, bay willow, grey willow, aspen, ash, purple-loosestrife, marsh fern, wild angelica, marsh woundwort, gypsywort, creeping spearwort, marsh cinquefoil, marsh-marigold, bittersweet, skullcap, corn mint, meadowsweet, trifid bur-marigold, and purple small-reed.

An inventory of dragonflies in the north-eastern end of the lake documented a presence of red-eyed damselfly, northern damselfly, azure damselfly, brown hawker, club-tailed dragonfly, downy emerald, and four-spotted chaser.

Fishes present in the lake include smelt, pike, roach, rudd, tench, bleak, silver bream, carp bream, crucian carp, burbot, perch, zander, and ruffe. Signal crayfish were introduced in the 1970s.

Common birds include great crested grebe, mute swan, Canada goose, mallard, coot, water rail, osprey, marsh harrier, northern lapwing, sandpiper, tern, gull, long-tailed tit, lesser spotted woodpecker, reed warbler, sedge warbler, marsh warbler, and thrush nightingale. Additionally, a couple of cranes has been breeding by the lake for about ten years.

The deciduous forest north of the lake and the shallow reeds there is an important biotope for bats, as the area produces a plenitude of insects while offering favourable milieux for hibernation. Inventories during the 1990s have documented a presence of northern bat, parti-coloured bat, Daubenton's bat, noctule, soprano pipistrelle, brown long-eared bat, and whiskered bat.

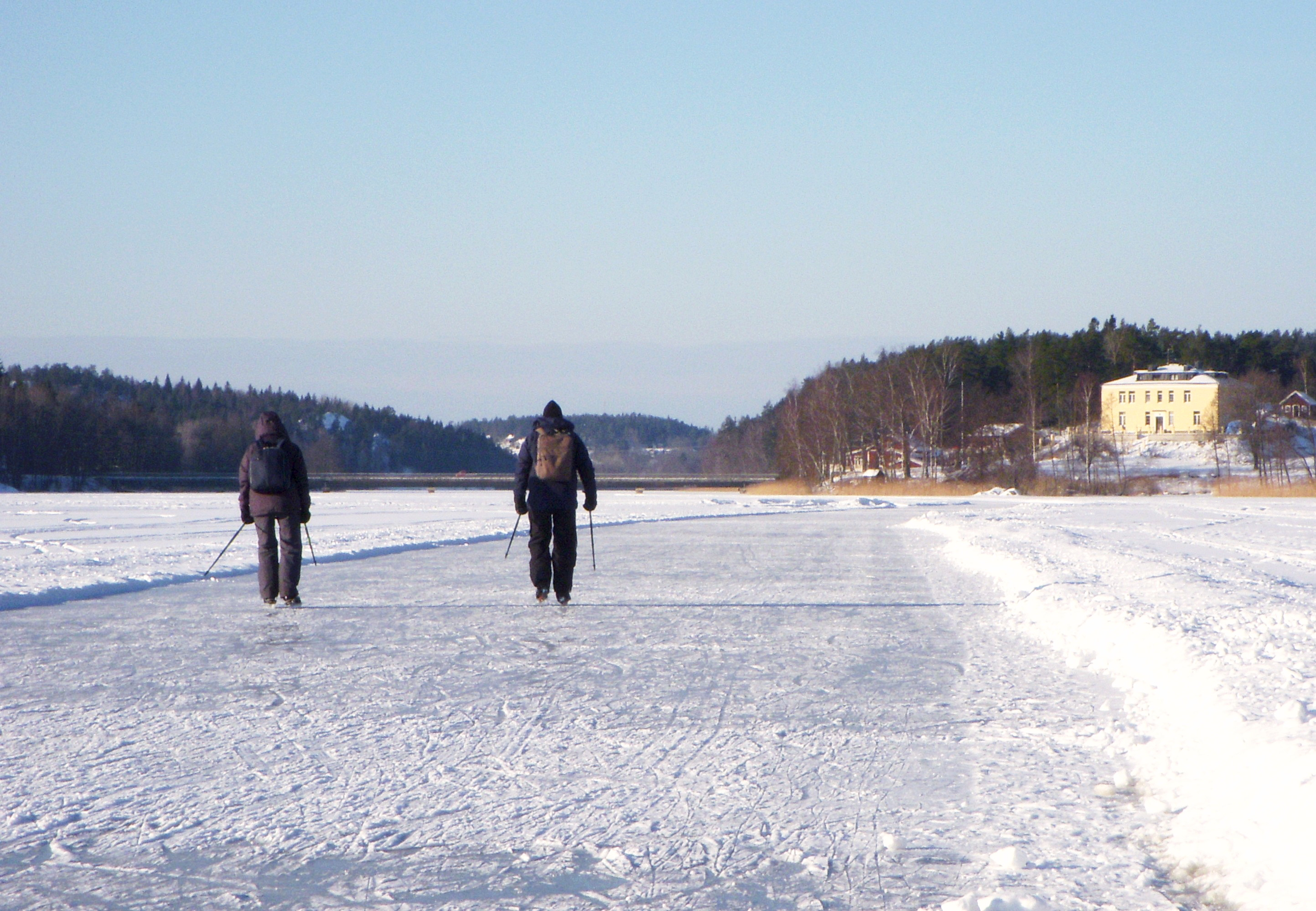
Orlången in the winter.

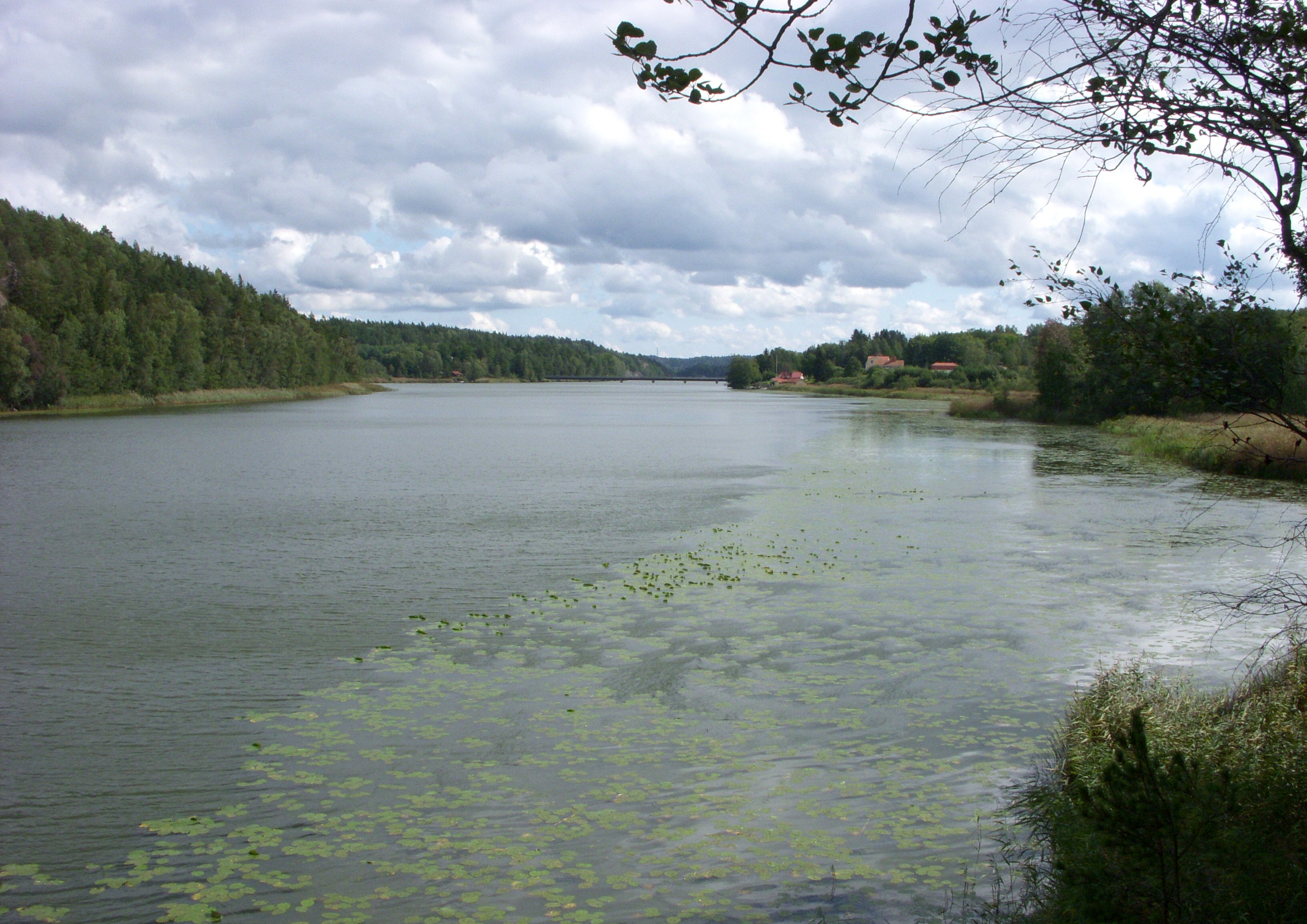
Orlången.

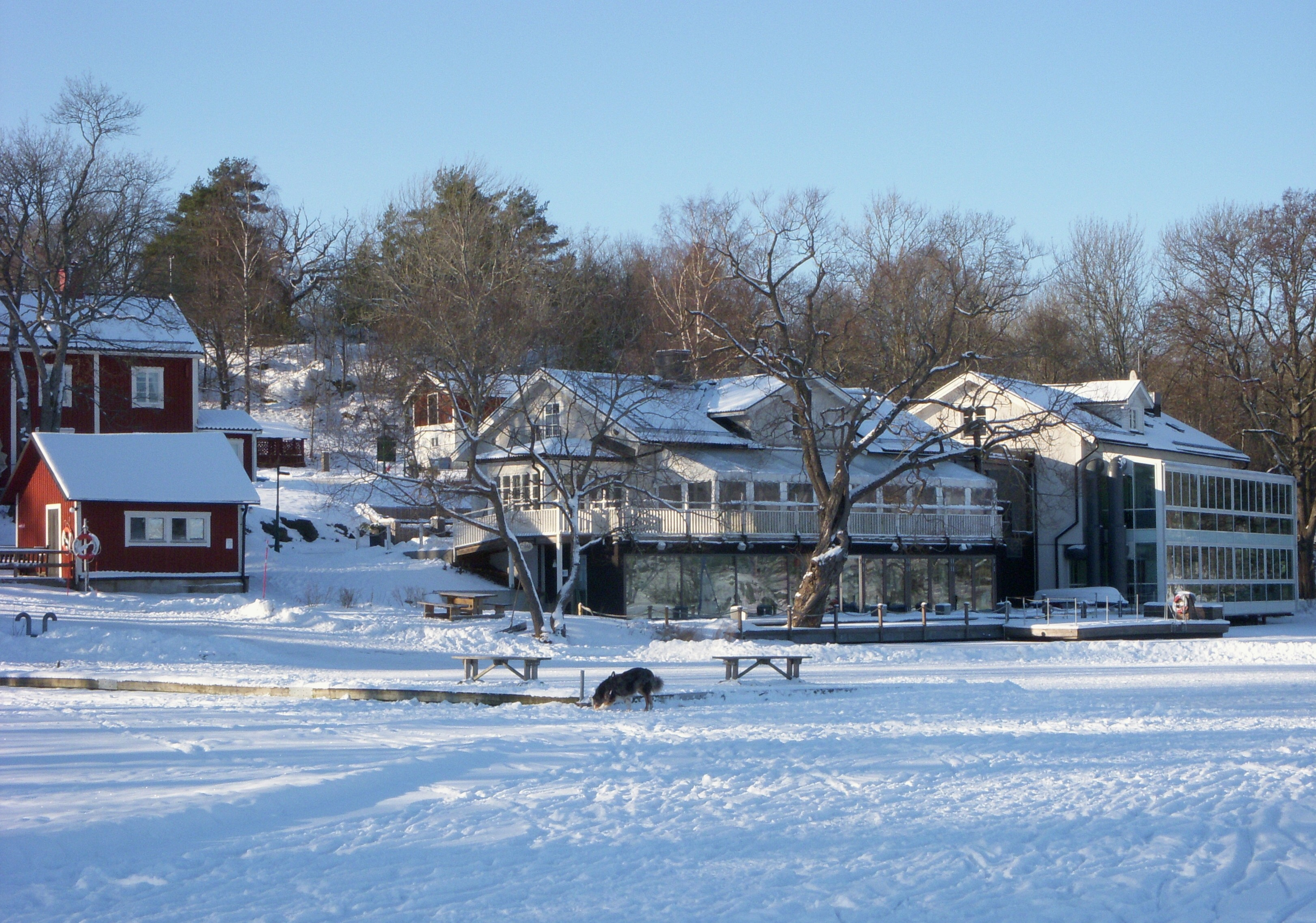
Sundby estate, 2012.

== See also ==
- Geography of Stockholm
