= Kvarnsjön, Gladö =

Lake in Botkyrka Municipality, Sweden

Kvarnsjön
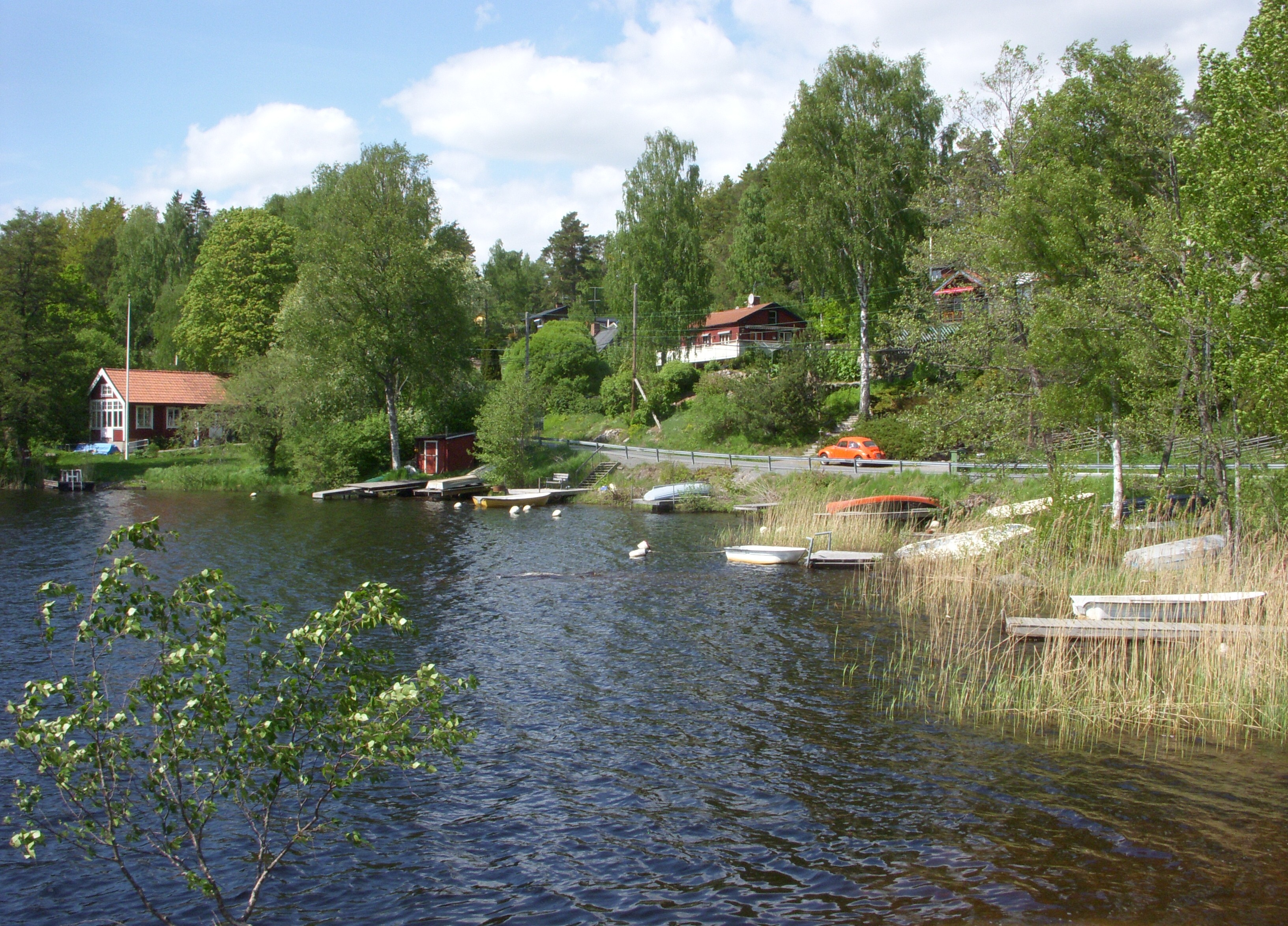

- Location within Stockholm
- Coordinates: 59°11′2″N 17°58′18″E
- Basin countries: Sweden

Kvarnsjön is a lake in Stockholm County, Södermanland, Sweden.

It is part of the Tyresån lake system.
