= Holmträsket =

Lake in Södermanland, Sweden

- Location within Stockholm
- Coordinates: 59°10′41″N 17°59′53″E
- Basin countries: Sweden

Holmträsket is a lake in Stockholm County, Södermanland, Sweden.
