= Öran =

Lake in Sweden

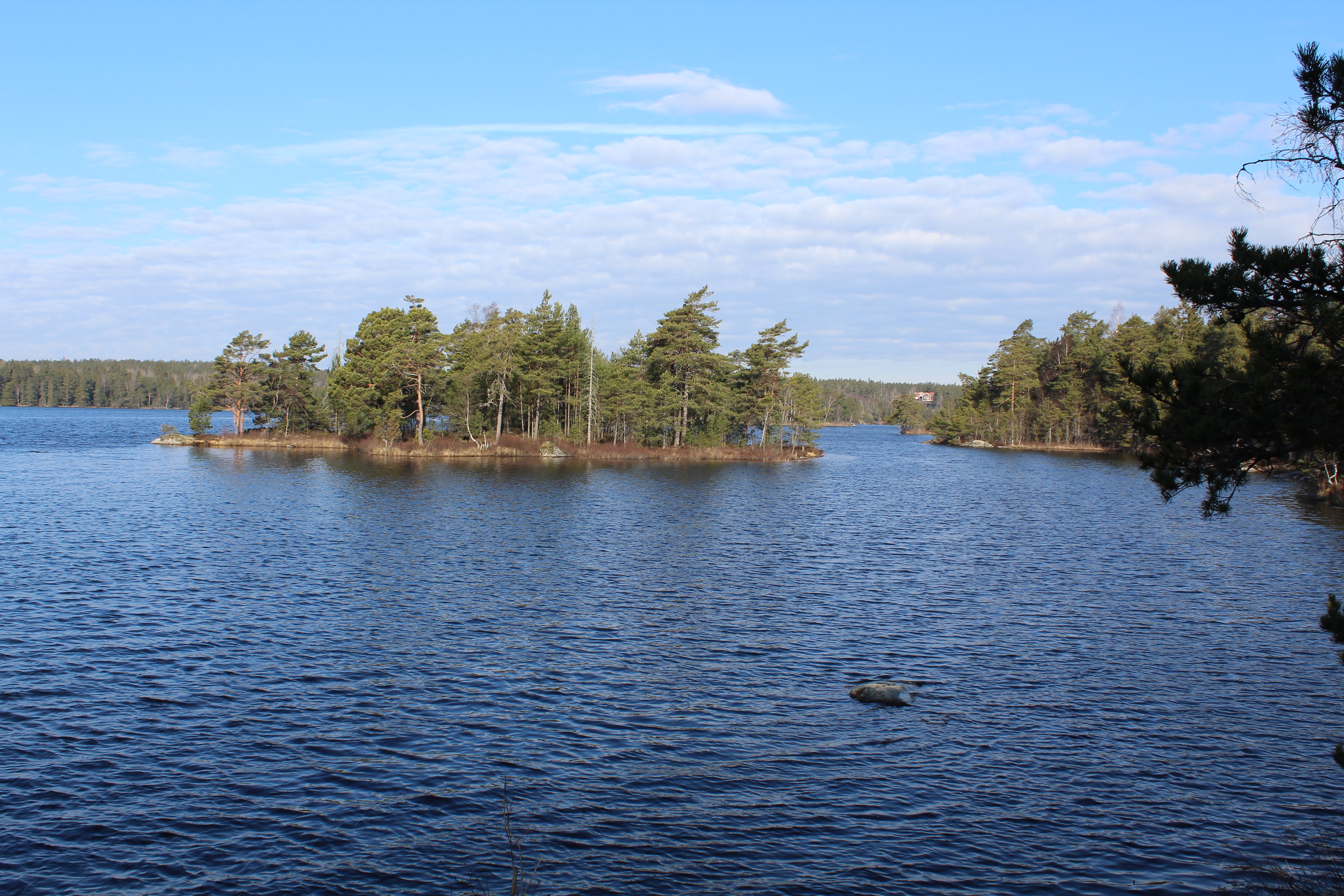

- Location within Stockholm
- Coordinates: 59°09′N 18°04′E
- Basin countries: Sweden

Öran is a lake in Stockholm County, Södermanland, Sweden.
