= Slender sedge =

Slender sedge is a common name for several plants and may refer to:

- Carex gracilior, native to California
- Carex lasiocarpa
