= Rudträsket =

Lake in Södermanland, Sweden

- Location within Stockholm
- Coordinates: 59°10′23″N 18°01′08″E
- Basin countries: Sweden

Rudträsket is a lake in Stockholm County, Södermanland, Sweden.
