= Lissmasjön =

Lake in Sweden

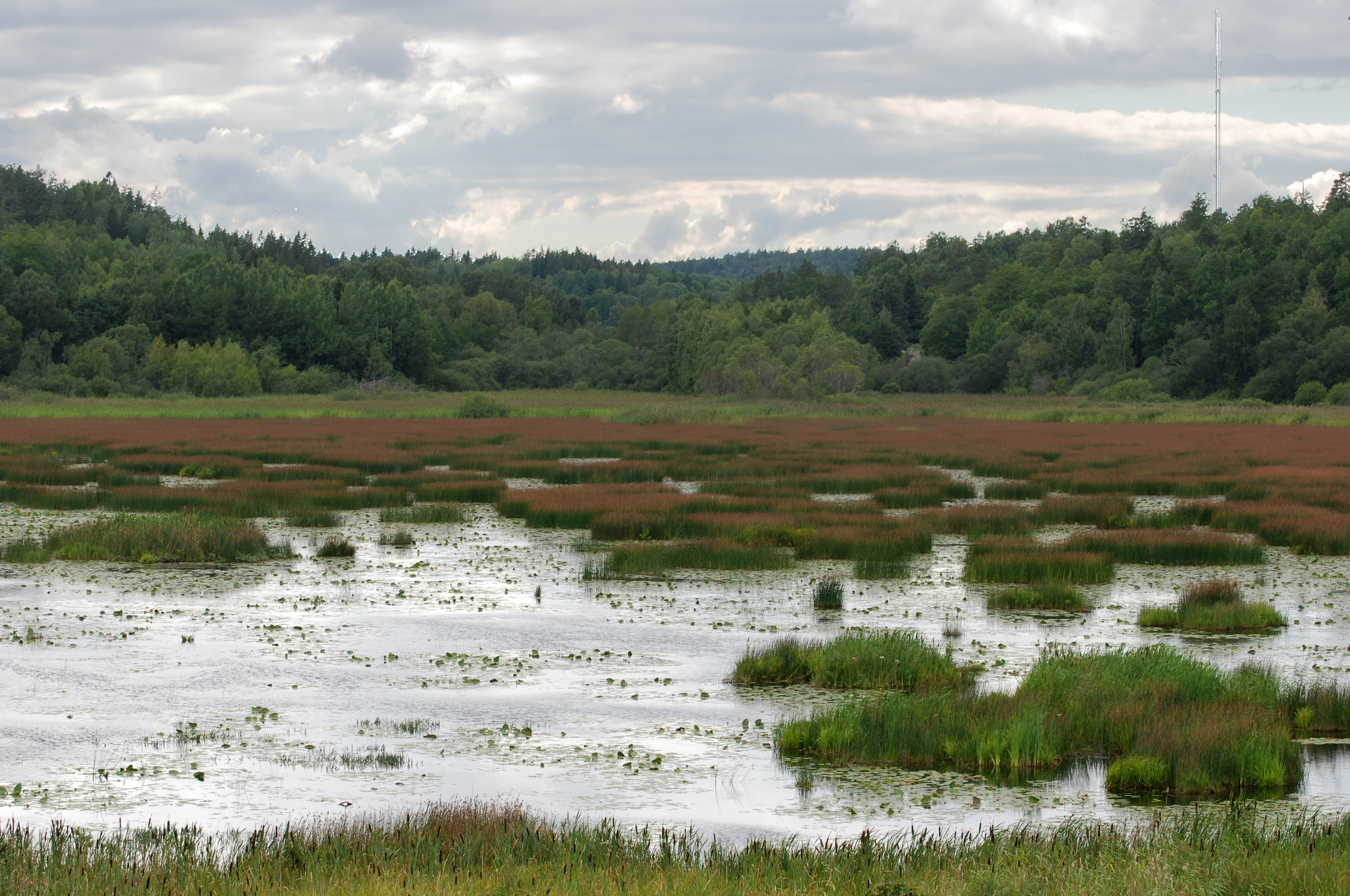

- Location within Stockholm
- Coordinates: 59°11′N 18°04′E
- Basin countries: Sweden

Lissmasjön is a lake in Stockholm County, Södermanland, Sweden.
