= Ormputten =

Lake in Sweden

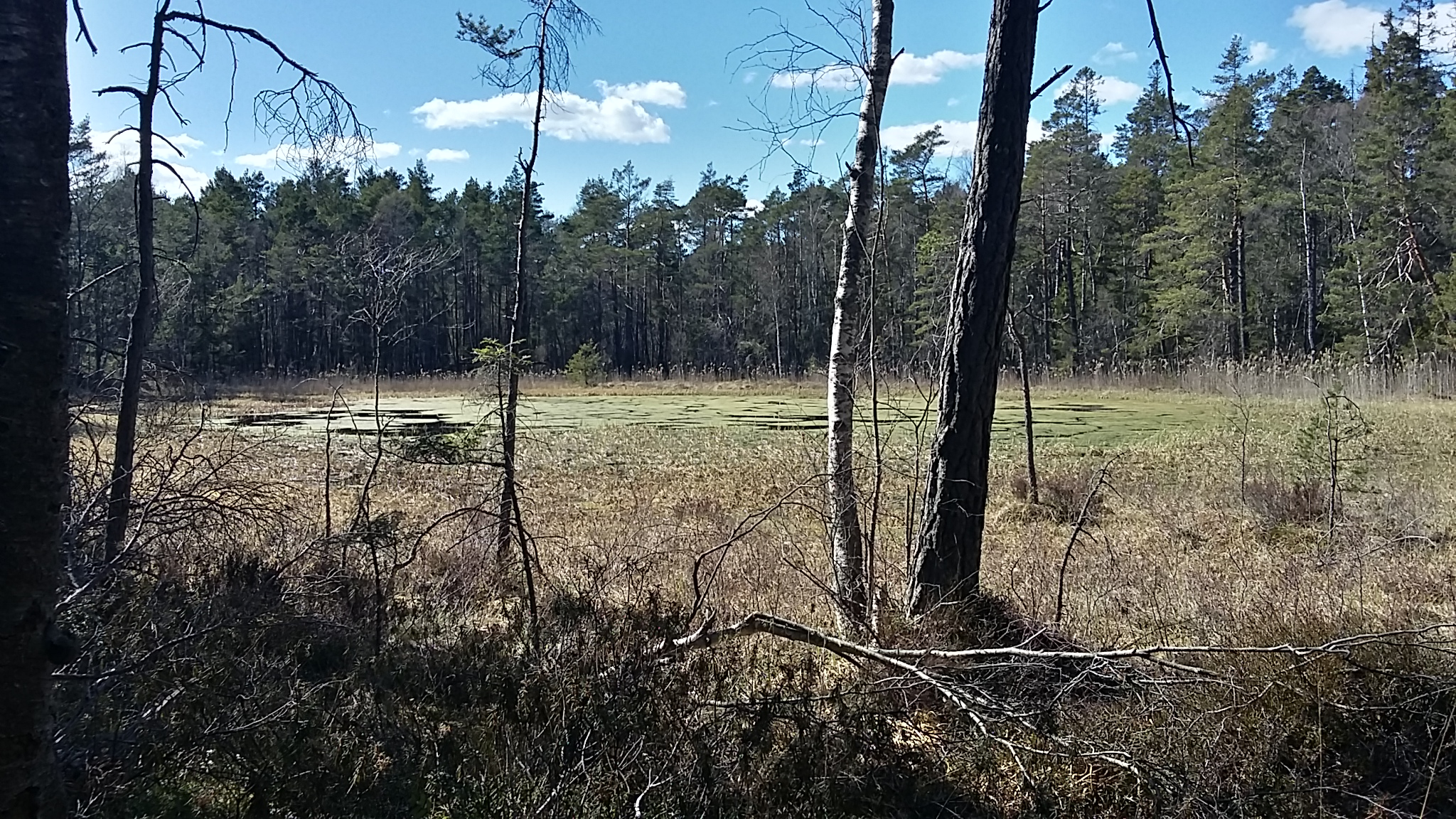
- Ormputten in May 2017

- Location within Stockholm
- Coordinates: 59°09′26″N 18°02′47″E
- Basin countries: Sweden
- Surface area: ~2,500 m^{2} (27,000 sq ft)
- Max. depth: 0.8 m (2 ft 7 in)
- Shore length^{1}: 160 m (520 ft)
- Surface elevation: 81 m (266 ft)
- ^{1} Shore length is not a well-defined measure.

Ormputten is a pseudo-lake in Stockholm County, Södermanland, Sweden. It is slowly retracting, and may soon become a bog. The water surface is very small, fairly round in shape, surrounded by quagmire and strongly acidic with a pH of about 3.9. The lake is situated in the Paradiset nature reserve, and requires a short hike through pathless terrain to access.
