= Kärrsjön =

Lake in Sweden

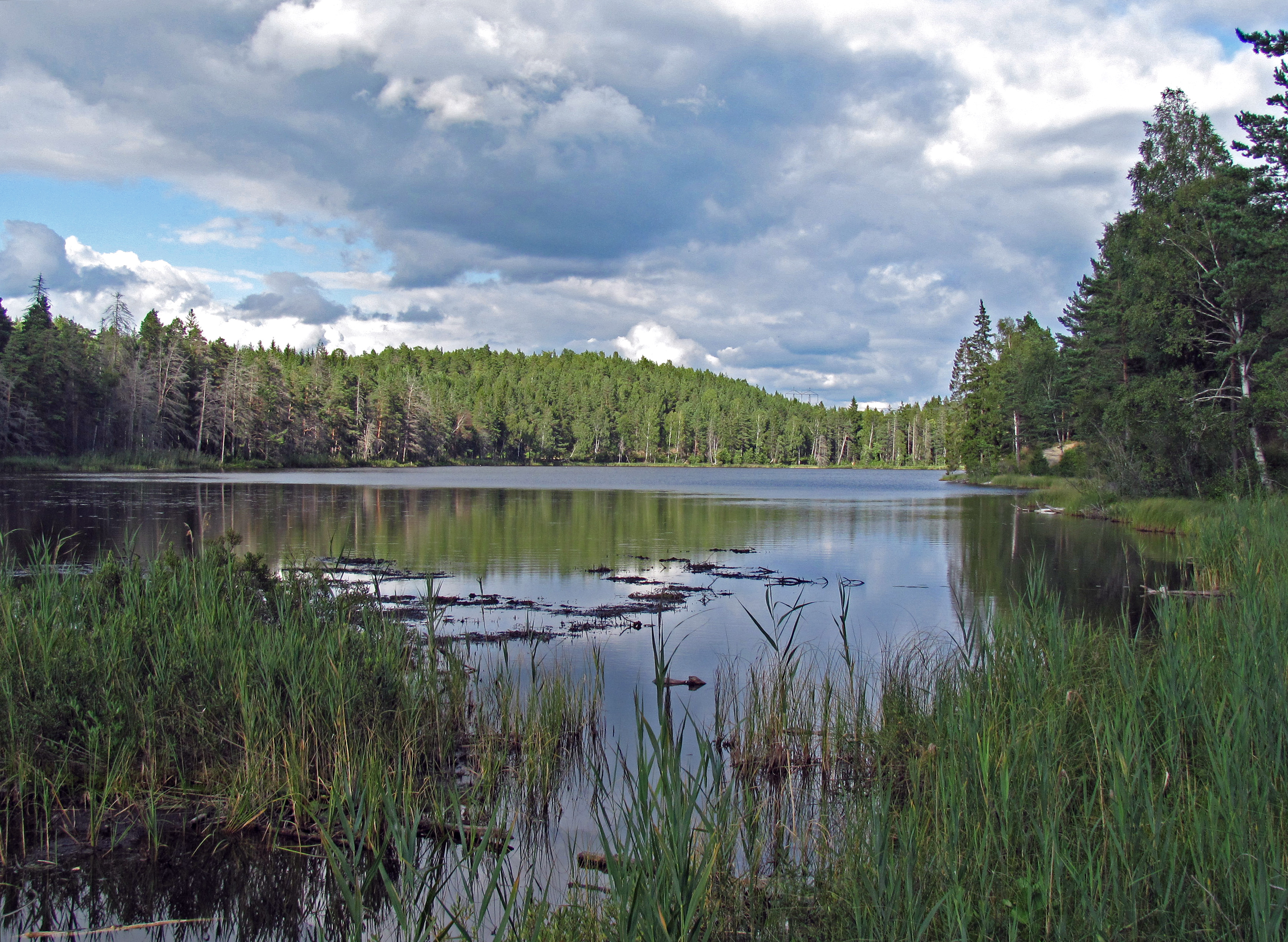

- Location within Stockholm
- Coordinates: 59°09′15″N 17°59′17″E
- Basin countries: Sweden

Kärrsjön is a lake in Stockholm County, Södermanland, Sweden.
