= Lake retention time =

Mean time that water spends in a lake

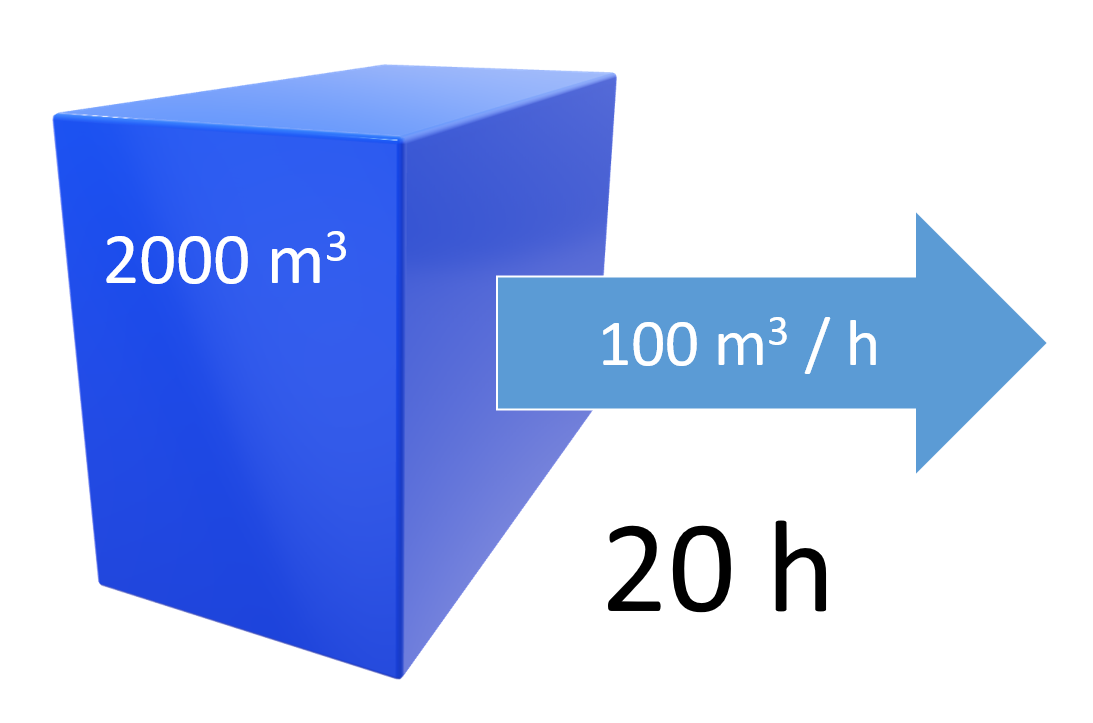
The lake retention time for a body of water with: – volume of 2,000 m^{3} (71,000 cu ft) and – exit flow of 100 m^{3}/h (3,500 cu ft/h) is 20 hours.

Lake retention time (also called the residence time of lake water, or the water age or flushing time) is a calculated quantity expressing the mean time that water (or some dissolved substance) spends in a particular lake. At its simplest, this figure is the result of dividing the lake volume by the flow into or out of the lake. It roughly expresses the amount of time taken for a substance introduced into a lake to flow out of it again. The retention time is particularly important where downstream flooding or pollutants are concerned.

== Global retention time ==
The global retention time for a lake (the overall mean time that water spends in the lake) is calculated by dividing the lake volume by either the mean rate of inflow of all tributaries, or by the mean rate of outflow (ideally including evaporation and seepage). This metric assumes that water in the lake is well-mixed (rather than stratified), so that any portion of the lake water is much like any other. In reality, larger and deeper lakes are generally not well-mixed. Many large lakes can be divided into distinct portions with only limited flow between them. Deep lakes are generally stratified, with deeper water mixing infrequently with surface water. These are often better modeled as several distinct sub-volumes of water.

== More specific residence times ==
It is possible to calculate more specific residence time figures for a particular lake, such as individual residence times for sub-volumes (e.g. particular arms), or a residence time distribution for the various layers of a stratified lake. These figures can often better express the hydrodynamics of the lake. However, any such approach remains a simplification and must be guided by an understanding of the processes operating in the lake.

Two approaches can be used (often in combination) to elucidate how a particular lake works: field measurements and mathematical modeling. One common technique for field measurement is to introduce a tracer into the lake and monitor its movement. This can be a solid tracer, such as a float constructed to be neutrally buoyant within a particular water layer, or sometimes a liquid. This approach is sometimes referred to as using a Lagrangian reference frame. Another field measurement approach, using an Eulerian reference frame, is to capture various properties of the lake water (including mass movement, water temperature, electrical conductivity and levels of dissolved substances, typically oxygen) at various fixed positions in the lake. From these can be constructed an understanding of the dominant processes operating in the various parts of the lake and their range and duration.

Field measurements alone are usually not a reliable basis for generating residence times, mainly because they necessarily represent a small subset of locations and conditions. Therefore, the measurements are generally used as the input for numerical models. In theory it would be possible to integrate a system of hydrodynamic equations with variable boundary conditions over a very long period sufficient for inflowing water particles to exit the lake. One could then calculate the traveling times of the particles using a Lagrangian method. However, this approach exceeds the detail available in current hydrodynamic models and the capacity of current computer resources. Instead, residence time models developed for gas and fluid dynamics, chemical engineering, and bio-hydrodynamics can be adapted to generate residence times for sub-volumes of lakes.

== Renewal time ==
One useful mathematical model is the measurement of how quickly inflows are able to refill a lake. Renewal time is a specific measure of retention time, where the focus is on 'how long does it take to completely replace all water in a lake.' This is modeling can only be done with an accurate budget of all water gained and lost by the system. Renewal time simply becomes a question how quickly could the inflows of the lake fill the entire volume of the basin (this does still assume the outflows are unchanged). For example if Lake Michigan was emptied, it would take 99 years for its tributaries to completely refill the lake.

== List of residence times of lake water ==
The residence time listed is taken from the infobox in the associated article unless otherwise specified.

Lake	Location	Basin countries	Residence time
Stausee Ferden	Ferden, Valais	Switzerland	36 hours
Lake Wohlen / Wohlensee	Canton of Bern	Switzerland	2.1 days
Lake Hévíz	Hévíz	Hungary	3 days
Lake St. Clair	Great Lakes	Canada, United States	7 days (2-30 days)
Lake Arapuni	North Island	New Zealand	1 week
Milton Pond	Strafford County, New Hampshire, York County, Maine	United States	11.1 days
Gibson Lake	Gibson Generating Station, Princeton, Indiana	United States	2 weeks
Råcksta Träsk	Stockholm	Sweden	2-3 weeks
Lake Sagami	Kanagawa	Japan	18 days
Lake Cristallina	Ticino	Switzerland	2-4 weeks
Northeast Pond	Strafford County, New Hampshire; York County, Maine	United States	23.7 days
Brandy Pond	Naples, Maine	United States	34 days
Champagne Pool	Waiotapu, North Island	New Zealand	34 days
Prospect reservoir	Prospect, New South Wales	Australia	30-40 days
Sicklasjön	Stockholm	Sweden	1.2 months
Devils Lake	Lincoln County, Oregon	United States	1.8 months
Lough Derg	Shannon River Basin	Ireland	1.8 months
Derwentwater	Lake District, Cumbria	England	55 days
Lake Biel / Bielersee / Lac de Bienne	Canton of Bern	Switzerland	58 days
Veluwemeer	Flevoland, Gelderland	Netherlands	2 months
Hacksjön	Tullinge	Sweden	2.4 months
Kamloops Lake	British Columbia	Canada	ca. 0.2 years (20-340 days)
Malham Tarn	North Yorkshire	England	11 weeks
Lac d'Anterne	Passy, Haute-Savoie	France	90 days
Graham Lake	Hancock County, Maine	United States	3 months
Grand Lac de Clairvaux	Jura department, Franche-Comté	France	3 months
Laduviken	Djurgården	Sweden	3 months
Esthwaite Water	Lake District, Cumbria	England	95 days
Trehörningen	Huddinge, Southern Stockholm County	Sweden	98 days
Lac de Divonne	Divonne-les-Bains, Ain	France	100 days
Lake Lesina / Lago di Lesina	Province of Foggia, Apulia	Italy	100 days
Seeweidsee	Canton of Zurich	Switzerland	100 days
Hüttnersee	Hütten, Canton of Zurich	Switzerland	120 days
Lake Lauerz / Lauerzersee	Canton of Schwyz	Switzerland	4 months
Morris Lake	Halifax Regional Municipality, Nova Scotia	Canada	4.1 months
Sobradinho Reservoir	Sobradinho, Bahia	Brazil	4.2 months
Balch Pond	Carroll County, New Hampshire; York County, Maine	United States	136 days
Magelungen	Huddinge	Sweden	4-5 months
Russell Lake	Halifax Regional Municipality, Nova Scotia	Canada	4.6 months
Loweswater	Lake District, Cumbria	England	150 days
Lappkärret	Stockholm	Sweden	5 months
Lough Feeagh	County Mayo	Ireland	5.6 months
Egelsee	Bubikon, Canton of Zurich	Switzerland	180 days
Lac de Vouglans	Jura, Franche-Comté	France	180 days
Mettmenhaslisee	Canton of Zurich	Switzerland	180 days
Albysjön	Stockholm	Sweden	6 months
Chesuncook Lake	Piscataquis County, Maine	United States	6 months
Clinton Lake	DeWitt County, Illinois	United States	6 months
Flagstaff Lake	Somerset County and Franklin County, Maine	United States	6 months
Lake Coeur d'Alene	Northern Idaho	United States	6 months
Lac de Saint-Point	Doubs department, Franche-Comté	France	200 days
Kyrksjön	Bromma	Sweden	7 months
Newnan's Lake	Gainesville, Florida	United States	7.2 months
Staples Pond	Temple, Maine	United States	8.2 months
Lac Cornu	Chamonix-Mont-Blanc, Haute-Savoie	France	250 days
Lac du Brévent	Chamonix, Haute-Savoie	France	250 days
Lake Silvaplana / Silvaplanersee / Lej da Silvaplauna	Engadin, Grisons	Switzerland	250 days
Loch Awe	Argyll and Bute	Scotland	8.4 months
Långsjön	Stockholm	Sweden	9-10 months
Lake Sarnen / Sarnersee	Obwalden	Switzerland	9.6 months
Lake Lovozero	Kola Peninsula, Murmansk Oblast	Russia	10 months
Drevviken	Stockholm	Sweden	10-11 months
Mörtsjön	Huddinge	Sweden	< 1 year
Judarn	Bromma, Stockholm	Sweden	11 months
Coniston Water	Lake District, Cumbria	England	340 days
Ullswater	Lake District, Cumbria	England	350 days
Khanka Lake	Heilongjiang Province, China and Primorsky Krai, Russia	China, Russia	1 year
Lake Monona	Dane County, Wisconsin	United States	1.1 years
Long Lake	Maine	United States	1.1 years
Mooselookmeguntic Lake	Franklin County, Maine	United States	1.1 years
Greifensee	Canton of Zurich	Switzerland	408 days
Nainital Lake	Uttarakhand	India	1.16 years
Manasbal Lake	Kashmir Valley	India	1.2 years
Lake Zurich / Zürichsee	Zürich	Switzerland	440 days
Tegernsee	Bavaria	Germany	1.28 years
Deer Creek Reservoir	Utah	United States	1.3 year
Orlången	Huddinge	Sweden	1.33 years
Haweswater Reservoir	Lake District, Cumbria	England	500 days
Loch Shiel	Lochaber, Highland	Scotland	1.37 year
Lake Walen /Walensee / Lake Walenstadt	St. Gallen, Glarus	Switzerland	1.4258 years
Keoka Lake	Maine	United States	1.5 years
Kootenay Lake	British Columbia	Canada	1.5 years
Lake Murten /Lac de Morat /Murtensee	Canton of Fribourg, Vaud	Switzerland	1.6 years
Oeschinen Lake	Bernese Oberland	Switzerland	1.61 years
Lac de Lessy	Haute-Savoie	France	600 days
East Grand Lake	Maine / New Brunswick	Canada, United States	1.7 years
Lake Ikeda	Kyūshū island	Japan	1.7 years
Lake Poyang	Jiujiang	China	0.173 years
Faaker See	Carinthia	Austria	1.8 years
Ossiacher See / Lake Ossiach	Carinthia	Austria	1.8 years
Varese Lake/Lago di Varese	Province of Varese, Lombardy	Italy	1.8 years
Long Lost Lake	Clearwater County, Minnesota	United States	1.8 years
Ältasjön	Älta	Sweden	1.8 years
Lake Thun / Thunersee	Canton of Bern	Switzerland	684 days
Green Lake	Maine	United States	1.9 years
Gömmaren	Huddinge	Sweden	1.9 yrs
Loch Lomond	Dunbartonshire, Central Scotland	Scotland	1.9 years
Lake Balaton	Hungary	Hungary	2 years
Lake Rotoroa	Hamilton, Waikato, North Island	New Zealand	approx. 2 years
Lake Tūtira	Hawke's Bay, North Island	New Zealand	2 years
Türlersee	Canton of Zurich	Switzerland	730 days
Pfäffikersee	Canton of Zurich	Switzerland	2.085 years
Caniapiscau Reservoir	Quebec	Canada	2.2 years
Lake Sils / Silsersee /Lej da Segl	Engadin, Grisons	Switzerland	2.2 years
Wilersee	Canton of Zug	Switzerland	2.2 years
Great Pond	Maine	United States	2.3 years
Moberly Lake	British Columbia	Canada	2.4 years
Päijänne	Jyväskylä	Finland	2.5 years
Lake Erie	North America	Canada, United States	2.6 years
Rangeley Lake	Franklin County, Maine	United States	2.6 years
Lake Brienz / Brienzersee	Canton of Bern	Switzerland	2.69 years
Ammersee / Lake Ammer	Upper Bavaria	Germany	2.7 years
Großer Plöner See	Schleswig-Holstein	Germany	3 years
Paudash Lake	Haliburton County, Ontario	Canada	3 years
Moosehead Lake	Maine	United States	3.1 years
Trekanten	Stockholm	Sweden	3.1 years
Great East Lake	Carroll County, New Hampshire; York County, Maine	United States	3.3 years
Lake Champlain	North America	Canada, United States	3.3 years
Flathead Lake	Montana	United States	3.4 years
Lake Lucerne /Vierwaldstättersee	Central Switzerland	Switzerland	3.4 years
Lake Winnipeg	Manitoba, Canada	Canada	3.5 years
Lac de Paladru	Isère	France	3.6 years
Lake Hallwil / Hallwilersee	Aargau	Switzerland	3.9 years
Flaten	Southern Stockholm	Sweden	4 years
Lake Annecy / Lac d'Annecy	Haute-Savoie	France	4 years
Lake Maggiore / Verbano / Lago Maggiore	Lombardy and Piedmont, Italy; Canton Ticino, Switzerland	Italy, Switzerland	4 years
Todos los Santos Lake	Los Lagos	Chile	4 years
Lake Baldegg / Baldeggersee	Canton of Lucerne	Switzerland	4.2 years
Lake Iseo / Lago d'Iseo	Lombardy	Italy	4.2 years
Lake Constance / Bodensee	Germany, Switzerland, Austria	Germany, Switzerland, Austria	4.3 years
Corey Lake	Michigan	United States	4.4 years
Elk and Beaver Lakes	Saanich, British Columbia	Canada	4.4 years (Elk Lake),
Lake Como	Lombardy	Italy	4.5 years
Lake Mendota	Wisconsin	United States	4.5 years
Sea of Galilee	Galilee	Israel	5 years
Walden Pond	Massachusetts	United States	5 years
Bannwaldsee	Allgäu, Bavaria	Germany	5.2 years
Sebago Lake	Cumberland County, Maine	United States	5.1 to 5.4 yrs
Kennisis Lake	Haliburton Highlands, Ontario	Canada	5.26 years
Bay Lake	Crow Wing County, Minnesota	United States	4-7 years
Lake Biwa / 琵琶湖	Shiga Prefecture	Japan	5.5 years
Jordan Pond	Hancock County, Maine	United States	6 years
Lago di Mergozzo	Piedmont	Italy	6 years
Lake Ontario	North America	Canada, United States	6 years
Lac la Nonne	Alberta	Canada	6.5 years
Lago di Candia	Province of Turin	Italy	6 or 7 years
Ägerisee	Canton of Zug	Switzerland	6.8 years
Loch Morar	Morar, Lochaber, Highland	Scotland	6.87 years
Lake Powell	Utah/Arizona	United States	7.2 years
Millstätter See / Lake Millstatt	Carinthia	Austria	7.5 years
Moose Lake	Alberta	Canada	7.5 years
Schaalsee	Schleswig-Holstein	Germany	5 to 10 years
Iliamna Lake	Lake and Peninsula Borough, Alaska	United States	7.8 years
Lac du Bourget	Savoie, France	France	8 years
Odell Lake	Klamath County, Oregon	United States	8 years
Lake Lugano /Lago di Lugano	Ticino, Lombardy	Switzerland, Italy	8.2 years
Lake Neuchâtel / Lac de Neuchâtel / Neuenburgersee	Romandy	Switzerland	8.2 years
Lake Orta /Lago d’Orta /Cusio	Piedmont	Italy	8.9 years
Weissensee	Carinthia	Austria	9.2 years
Quesnel Lake	British Columbia	Canada	10.1 years
Schweriner See	Mecklenburg-Vorpommern	Germany	10.1 years
Lake Taupō	Taupō District, Waikato region, North Island	New Zealand	10.5 years
Wörthersee / Lake Wörth	West of Klagenfurt	Austria	10.5 years
Lake Chelan	Washington	United States	10.6 years
Lake Geneva	Switzerland, France	Switzerland, France	11.4 years
Lake Wakatipu	Queenstown-Lakes District, Otago Region, South Island	New Zealand	c. 12 years
Higgins Lake	Michigan	United States	12.5 years
Crescent Lake	Klamath County, Oregon	United States	13 years
Yellowstone Lake	Yellowstone National Park, Wyoming	United States	14 years
Lake Zug / Zugersee	Central Switzerland	Switzerland	14.7 years
Müritz	Mecklenburg-Vorpommern	Germany	15 years (?)
Western Brook Pond	Gros Morne National Park, Newfoundland, Newfoundland and Labrador	Canada	15.4 years
Lake Sempach / Sempachersee	Canton of Lucerne	Switzerland	16.9 years
Skaneateles Lake	New York	United States	18 years
Cayuga Lake	New York	United States	18.2 years
Bear Lake	Idaho, Utah	United States	19.6 years
Green Lake	Green Lake County, Wisconsin	United States	21 years
Lake Starnberg /Starnberger See	Bavaria	Germany	21 years
Lake Huron	North America	Canada, United States	22 years
Lake Garda / Lago di Garda	Northern Italy	Italy	26.8 years
Waldo Lake	Cascade Mountains	United States	32 years
Crystal Lake	Benzie County, Michigan	United States	30 to 60 years
Lake Columbia	Jackson County, Michigan	United States	47 years
Okanagan Lake	British Columbia	Canada	52.8 years
Lake Ohrid		Albania, North Macedonia	70 years
Lake Michigan	Michigan, Wisconsin, Illinois, Indiana	United States	99 years
Arendsee	Saxony-Anhalt	Germany	100 years
Gull Lake	Alberta	Canada	>100 years
Lake Yosemite	California	United States	121 years
Great Bear Lake	Northwest Territories	Canada	124 years
Crater Lake	Oregon	United States	157 years
Lake Superior	North America	Canada, United States	191 years
Caspian Sea		Azerbaijan, Iran, Kazakhstan, Russia, Turkmenistan	250 years
Lake Baikal	Southern Siberia	Russia	330 years
Lake Tahoe	California, Nevada	United States	650 years
Lake Titicaca		Peru, Bolivia	1,343 years
Lake Eucumbene	Snowy Mountains, New South Wales	Australia	1,953 years
Lakes Qaban	Kazan	Russia	2,000 years
Lake Tanganyika		Burundi, DR Congo, Tanzania, Zambia	5,500 years
Lake Vostok		Antarctica	13,300 years

== See also ==
- Water cycle: Residence times
