= Aiguilles Rouges National Nature Reserve =

Protected area in France

- IUCN category IV (habitat/species management area)
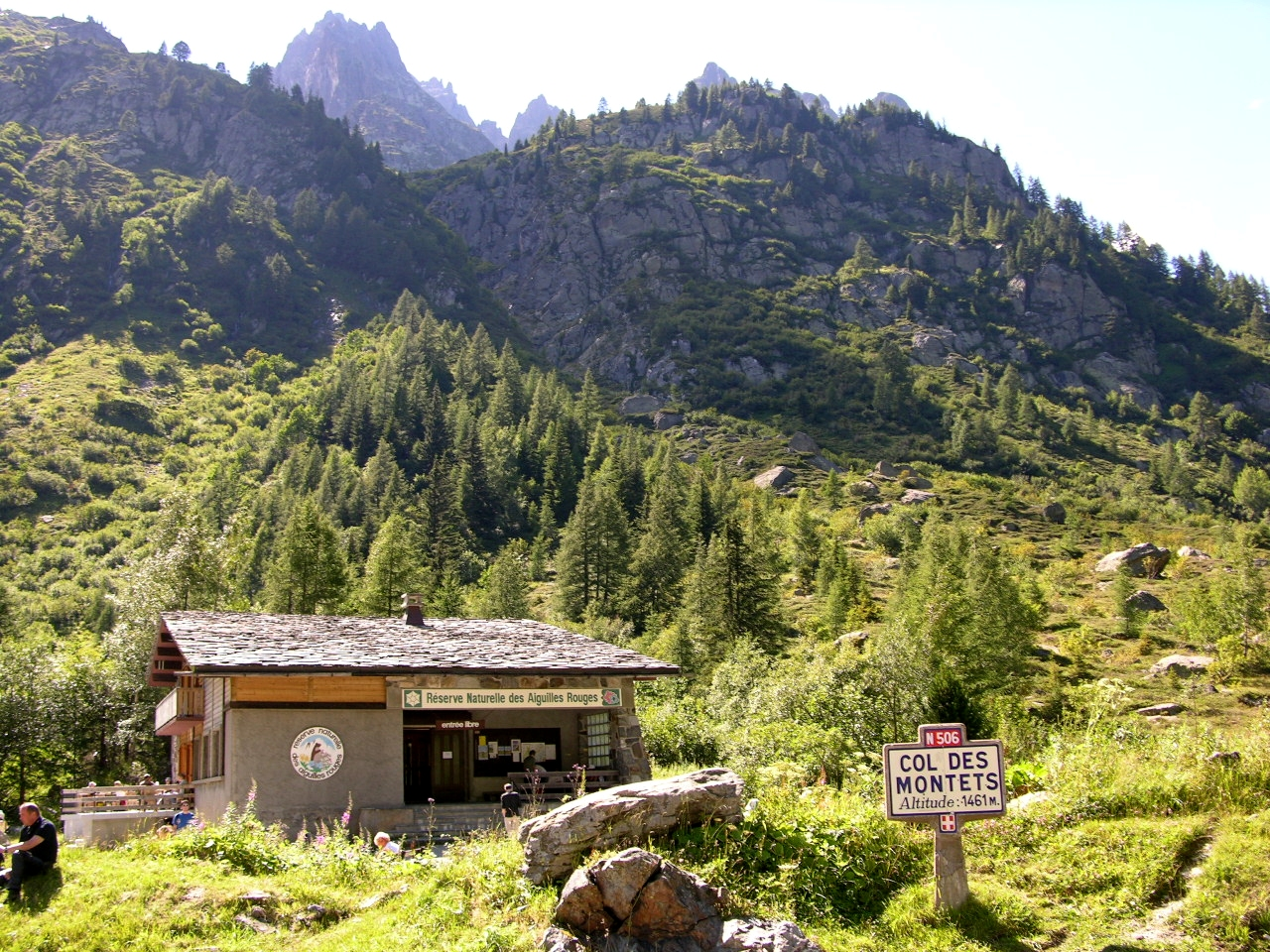
- The information cabin at the Col des Montets
- Interactive map of Aiguilles Rouges National Nature Reserve
- Location: Haute-Savoie, Rhone-Alpes, France
- Coordinates: 45°58′45″N 6°52′15″E
- Area: 32.79 km^{2} (12.66 sq mi)
- Established: 23 August 1974
- Operator: ASTERS
- Website: www.rnaiguillesrouges.org

The Aiguilles Rouges National Nature Reserve is a nature reserve located in the Aiguilles Rouges mountain range in the Haute-Savoie department in southeastern France.

== Location ==
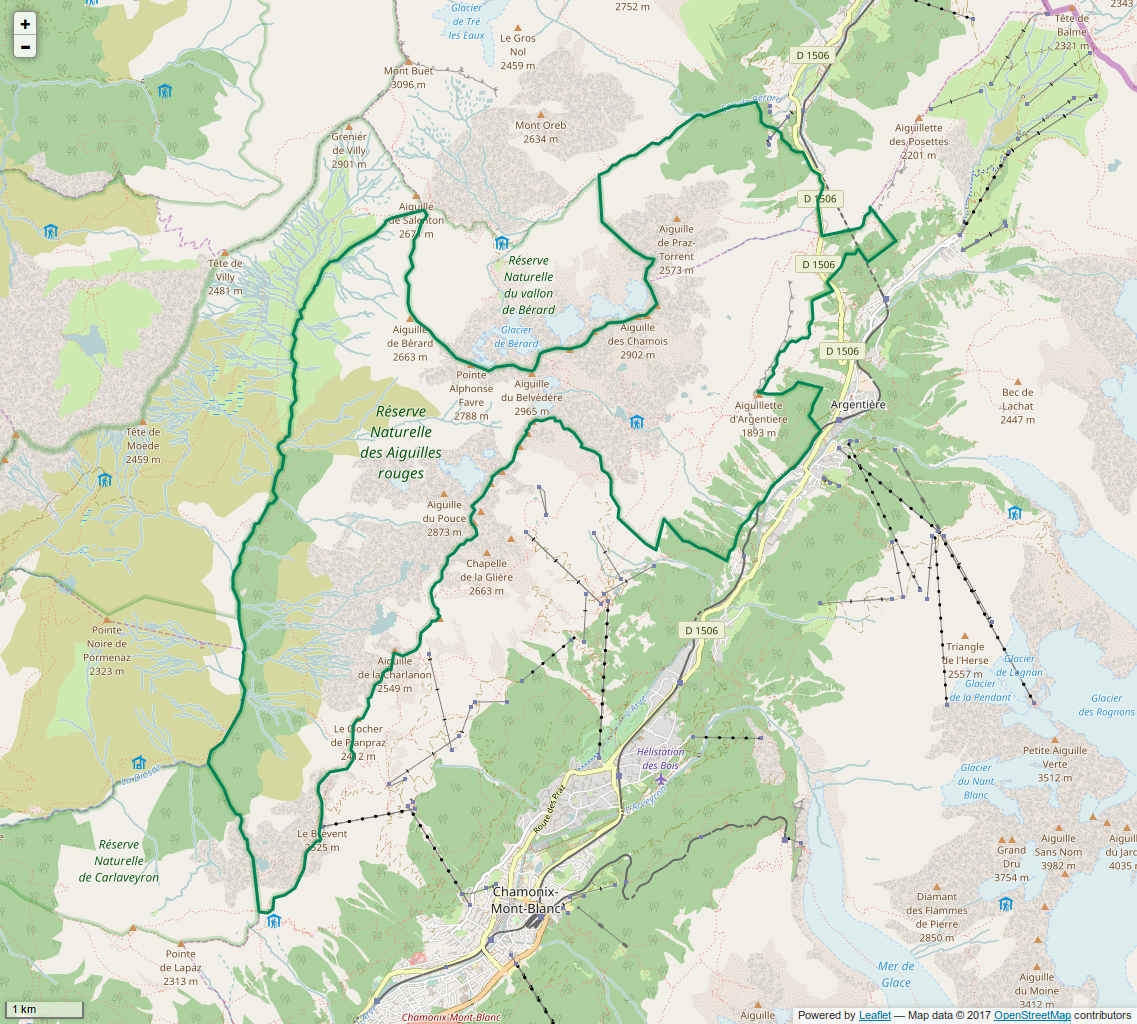
Perimeter of the Aiguilles Rouges National Nature Reserve.

In the Haute-Savoie department, on the northern side of the Chamonix valley, the Aiguilles Rouges mountain range spreads from Les Houches to the Col des Montets. The nature reserve affects the communes of Chamonix and Vallorcine and encompasses two complementary sectors of this mountain range:

- the North-East extremity overlooking the Argentière village;
- the western part overlooking the Diosaz valley from the Aiguille de Salenton to the Brévent.

== History ==
In the 1960s, a small reserve was created outside the alpine village of Argentière. In 1968, the Aiguilles Rouges mountain range became a game reserve. At the insistence of Jean Eyherald, the priest of Argentière, and a geologist, Yvonne Gubler, an observation site for the Alps was installed above Argentière. Accessible via chairlift, it became difficult to access following an accident. A site at the Col des Montets (a mountain pass) was chosen. In 1971 with the support of mountaineer Maurice Herzog, Chamonix-Mont-Blanc and Vallorcine created la réserve intercommunale du col des Montets (Intercommunal reserve of the Col des Montets). The reserve was created by ministerial decree on 1974-08-24. It covers 3,279 hectares (8,100 acres) in the communes of Chamonix and Vallorcine. The nature reserve is managed by the ASTERS association, which is responsible for all the nature reserves in Haute-Savoie.

Since 2006 the reserve has been under consideration for either declassification or reclassification, because of contention over a private landowner not being covered under the constitution in 1974. The reserve was reclassified on 2010-01-27 by a new ministerial decree, after a public inquiry.

The nature reserve is adjacent to two others:

- Vallon de Bérard National Nature Reserve, established in 1992 in Vallorcine
- Carlaveyron National Nature Reserve, established in 1991, situated near the Gorges de la Diosaz in Les Houches

In the reserve one can find typical mountainous plant and animal species, such as Alpine ibex, chamois, rock ptarmigan, golden eagle, Rhododendron, and heather. Multiple lakes are situated within the nature reserve, including Lac Blanc, Lac Noir, Lac Cornu, and Lac du Brévent.

== Visitor information ==
An information cabin, open from the first of June to the fifteenth of September, is located at the Col des Montets and provides information to visitors about the alpine fauna and flora, activities, and scientific pursuits. A curving "discovery path" accesses the top of the pass, allowing a pleasant overview of the characteristic natural areas of the nature reserve, and more generally the Alps.

The information cabin and the discovery path, both started in 1976, are the two elements central to the environmental education of the reserve. Both are accessible to the general public and for this reason, the nature reserve is considered a success.
