= Passy National Nature Reserve =

Protected area in France

- IUCN category IV (habitat/species management area)
- Location within France
- Location: Haute-Savoie, France
- Nearest city: Passy, Haute-Savoie
- Coordinates: 45°58′14″N 6°48′25″E
- Area: 1,717 hectares (4,240 acres)
- Established: 1980
- Website: www.asso-reservenaturelle-passy.com

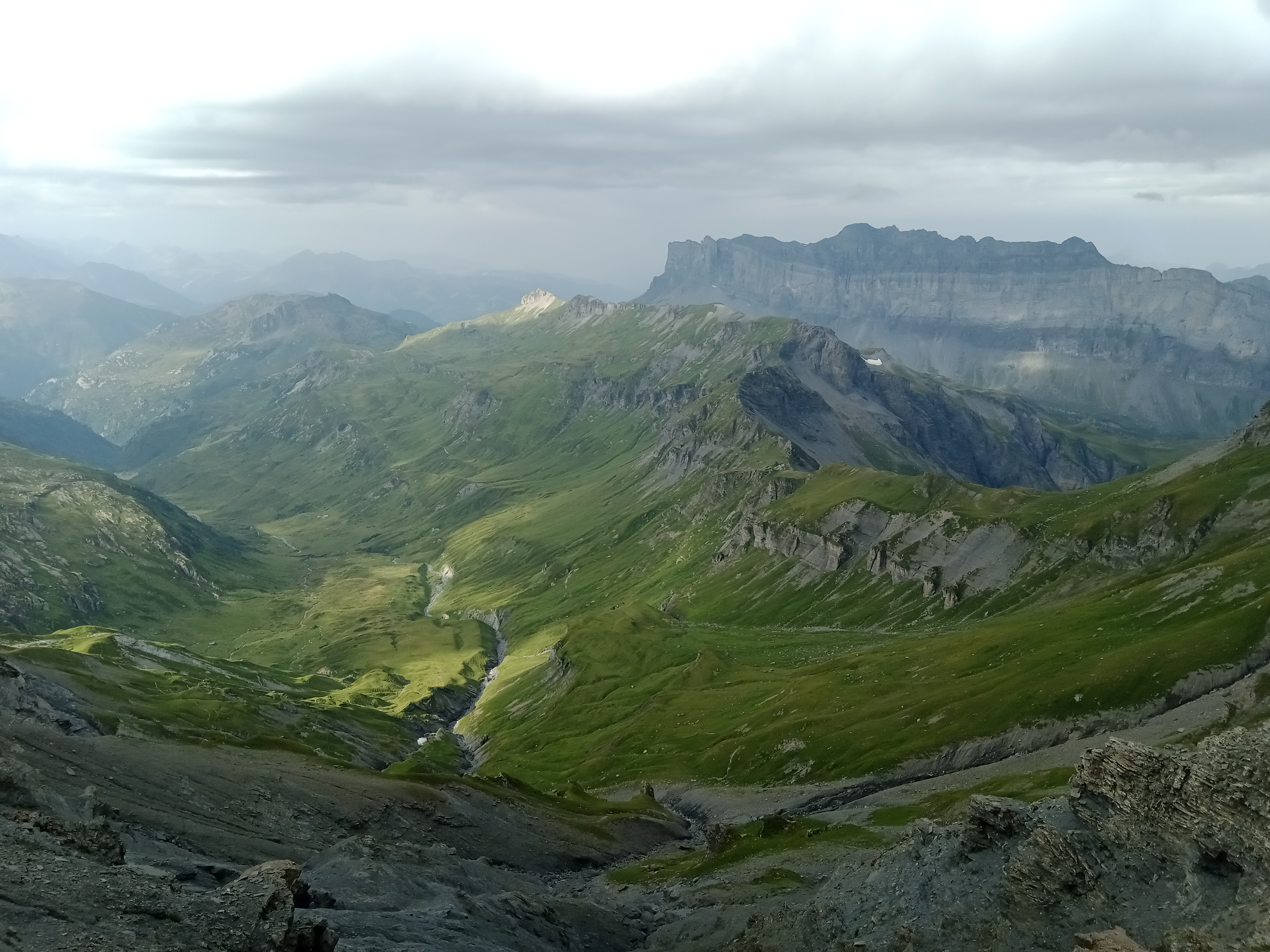
The Sixt-Passy National Nature Reserve

The Passy National Nature Reserve is a nature reserve located on the face of the Aiguilles Rouges and Mont Blanc mountain ranges, in the middle of the Arve valley, in the Haute-Savoie metropolitan department of France.

The 1,717 hectares (4,240 acres) have been protected since 1980; the reserve assures a continuous link of protected areas between the Sixt-Passy National Nature Reserve and the Aiguilles Rouges National Nature Reserve.

The natural history of the reserve mirrors that of the surrounding mountains. The young rock cliffs of the Fiz mountain range dominate the former Pormenaz mountain range. The tectonic activity of the Alps continues to bring the Fiz rock cliffs closer to the siliceous rocks of the Pormenaz.

This mineralogical history caused a great diversity of land areas such as meadows, heaths, and wetlands, which are inhabited by numerous species such as eagles and Alpine Ibexes.

This landscape testifies to the geologic history of the area: the 600 metres (2,000 ft) of vertical walls of the calcareous cliffs of the Fiz, a marvel of nature, tell the 90 million year shared history of the oceans and the Alps.
