= Lacs de Clairvaux =

Pair of lakes in France

Grand Lac de Clairvaux
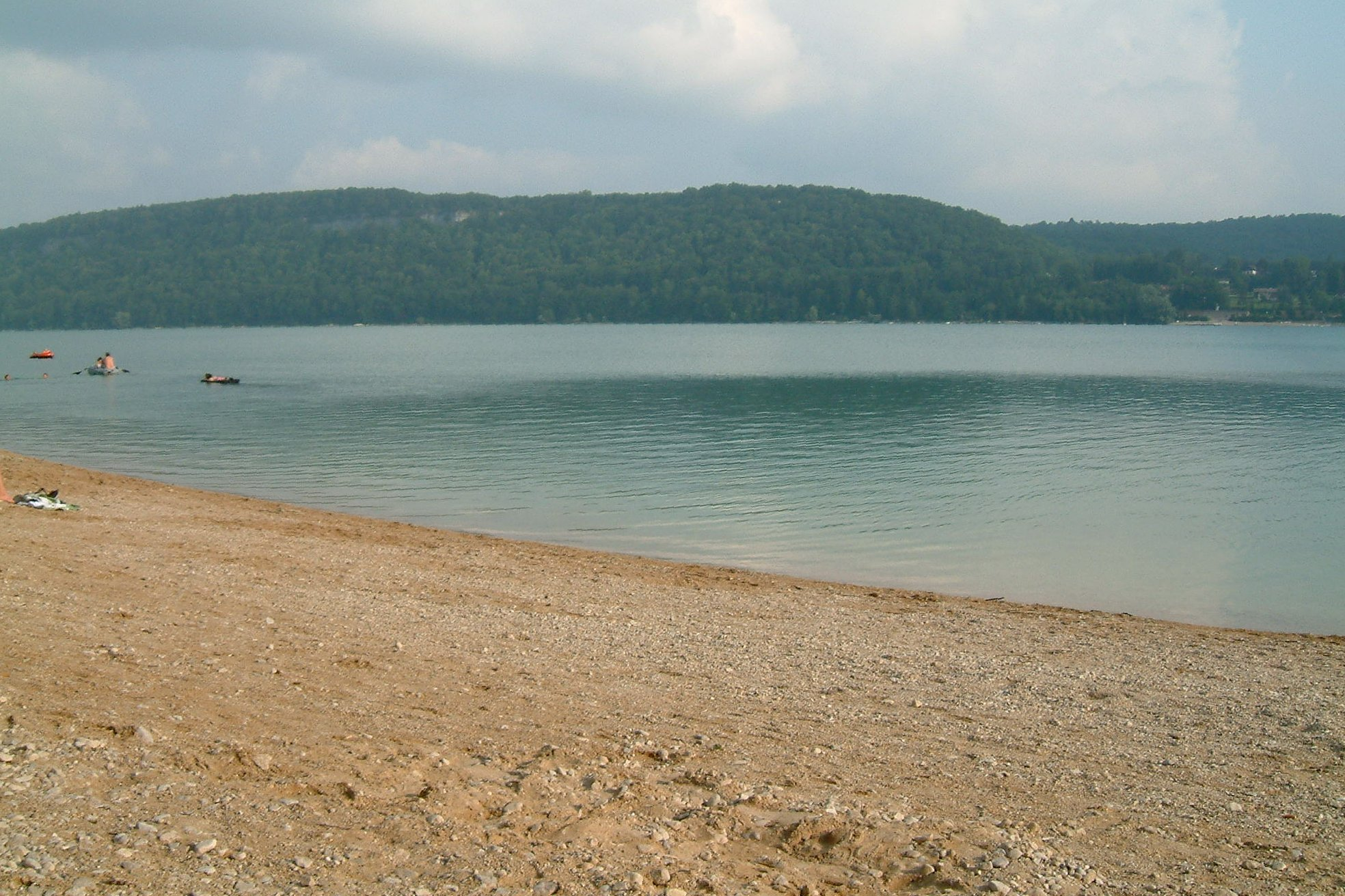

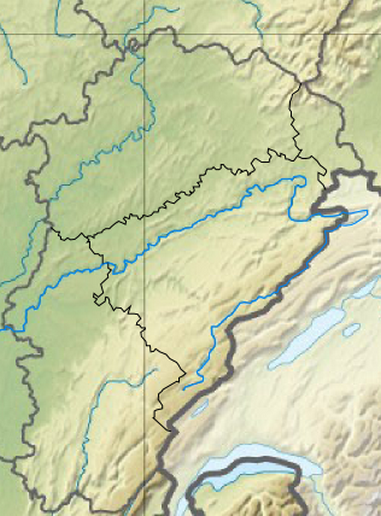
- Location within Franche-Comté
- Location: Jura department, Franche-Comté
- Coordinates: 46°33′55.9″N 5°44′57.3″E
- Lake type: natural, glacial
- Primary inflows: Augeon
- Primary outflows: Augeon
- Basin countries: France
- Max. length: 1.2 km (0.75 mi)
- Max. width: 650 m (2,130 ft)
- Surface area: 56.5 ha (140 acres)
- Average depth: 7.8 m (26 ft)
- Max. depth: 20 m (66 ft)
- Residence time: 3 months
- Surface elevation: 525 m (1,722 ft)
- Settlements: Clairvaux-les-Lacs

Lacs de Clairvaux are two lakes at Clairvaux-les-Lacs in the Jura department of France. The Grand Lac has a surface area of 56.5 ha, the Petit Lac of 17 ha.
