= Chafika Meslem =

Algerian politician (1934–2000)

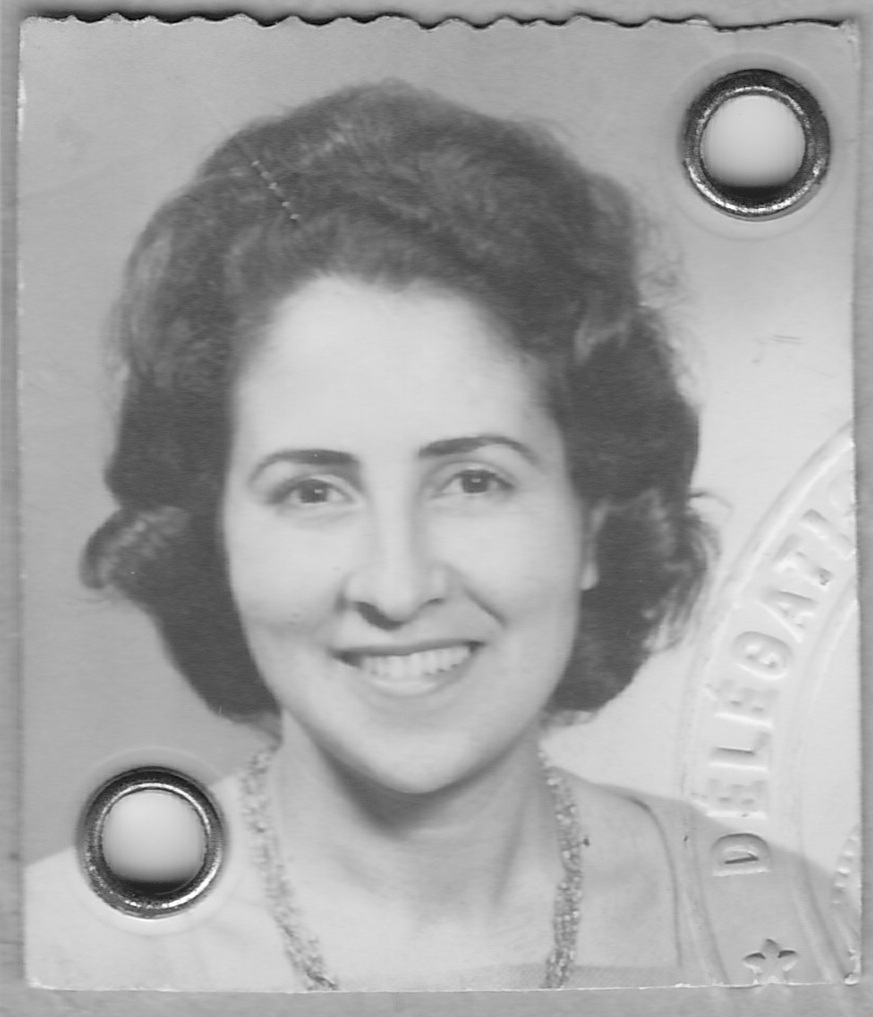

Personal details
- Born: October 2, 1934 Algiers, Algeria
- Died: July 2000 (aged 65) Zürich, Switzerland

Chafika Meslem (October 2, 1934 – July 2000) was an Algerian politician and diplomat.

== Early life ==
Chafika Meslem was born on October 2, 1934, in Belouizdad, then known as Belcourt, a district in Algiers. She grew up there with her five brothers and sisters. She was from a very modest background: her father was a docker and her mother was a dressmaker. She attended primary and secondary school in Algiers. Her university studies in literature and the political sciences were interrupted by the outbreak of the Algerian war of independence. As part of the revolutionary generation of 1954, she participated in the resistance movement for the liberation of Algeria. Arrested in early 1957 and later sentence, she had to leave the country until after the country gained independence in July 1962.

Chafika was already very active in her early childhood as she participated in many activities such as scouts, municipal conservatory and went to summer camps that shaped her personality and open-mindness. At the age 8, during the World War II context while her teacher was about to put her with her jew classmates, she firmly stood and affirmed that she belongs to her country and that she isn't a stranger.

== Career ==
Chafika Meselm began her professional career at the Algerian diplomatic mission in Geneva. From 1962 to 1981, she served in the Algerian diplomatic corps in several capacities: as Attache, Secretary, Counsellor and Minister Plenipotentiary, and as chief of the Algerian delegation to several international conferences, such as those of UNESCO (1962), WHO (from 1964-1970), ECOSOC (2965, 2966 and 1973), UNDP (1969 and 1970), United Nationals General Assembly (as representative to the 3rd Committee from 1971 to 1976) and the UNIDO Conference in Lima (1975).

In 1971, she was appointed by former President Boumediene as a member of the Algerian National Committee on the revision of the Family Code. During this period she also performed the following functions:

Chairwoman of the Group of 77 in Geneva (1978); Chief of the Algerian delegation to the 4th Ministerial Meeting of the Group of 77 in Arusha (February 1979); Deputy Chief of the Algerian delegation to the 5th UNCTAD Conference in Manila (May 1979); President of the working group on “Applicable Laws and Settlements of Disputes of the Conference on the Code of Conduct for the Transfer of Technology” (June 1980); Vice President and Rapporteur during the 21st session of the Committee on Trade and Development (September 1980); President of the First Committee at the 22nd Session of the United Nations Trade and Development Commission (March 1981); and Deputy Chief of the delegation to the United Nations Conference on Economic Cooperation with Developing Countries (September 1981).

In December 1981, Meslem became the Director of the Branch for the Advancement of Women of the Centre for Social Development and Humanitarian Affairs of the United Nations. In 1985 she was appointed Deputy Secretary-General to the World Conference held in Nairobi to review and appraise the results of the United Nations Decade for Women.

She is the first woman with the rank of minister plenipotentiary in Algeria.

== Death and legacy ==
Chafika Meslem died in July 2000 in Zürich and is buried in Divonne-Les-Bains in France.
