= Lac de Pormenaz =

Lake in France

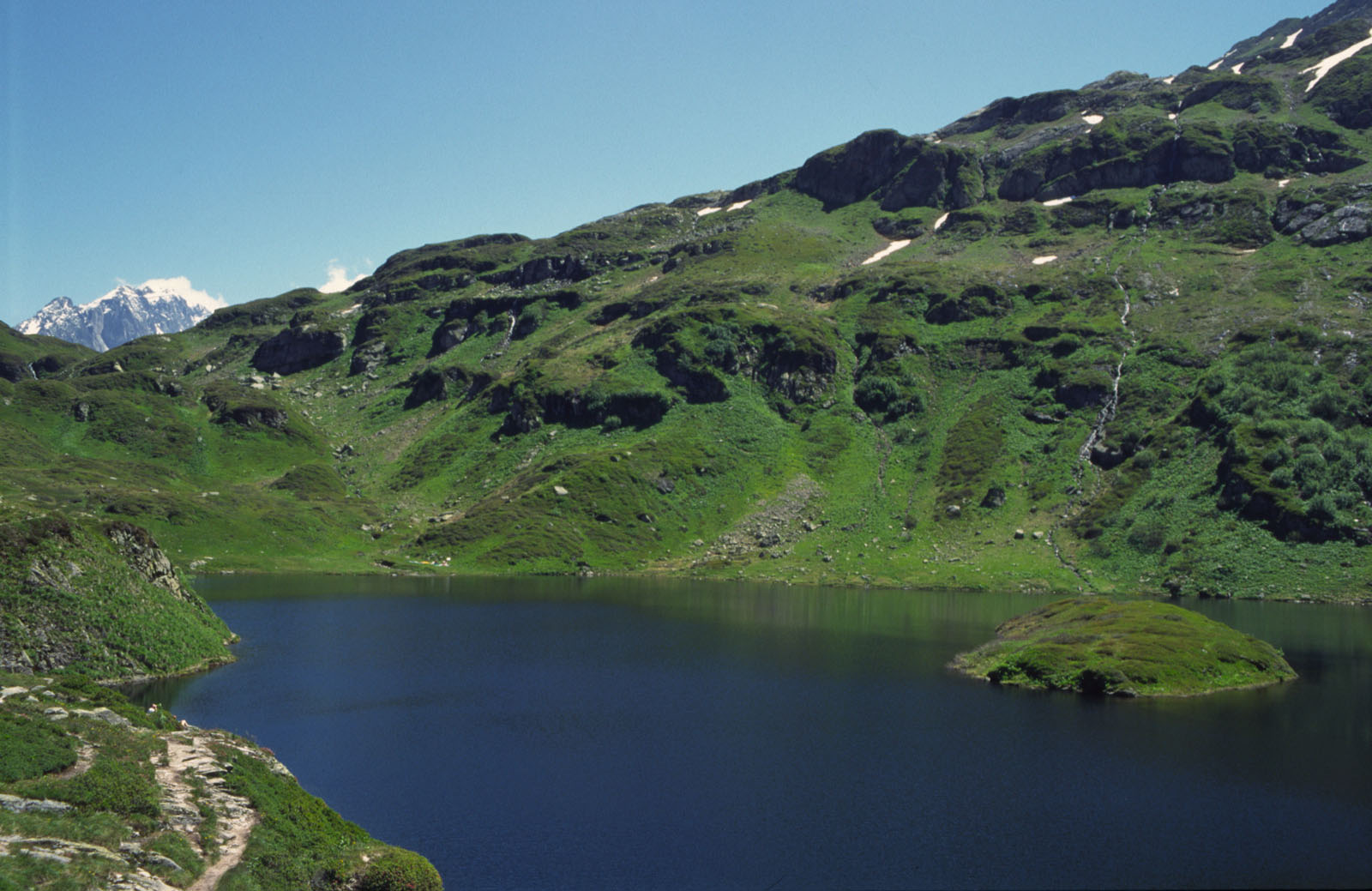

- Location within Auvergne-Rhône-Alpes Location within France
- Location: Haute-Savoie
- Coordinates: 45°57′44″N 6°47′38″E
- Basin countries: France
- Surface area: 4.4 ha (11 acres)
- Surface elevation: 1,945 m (6,381 ft)

Lac de Pormenaz is an alpine lake in the Passy National Nature Preserve (Réserve naturelle nationale de Passy) of the Haute-Savoie department of France. Its surface area of 4.4 ha is at an elevation of 1945 m.

The lake can be reached by foot from the village of Plaine Joux above Servoz.

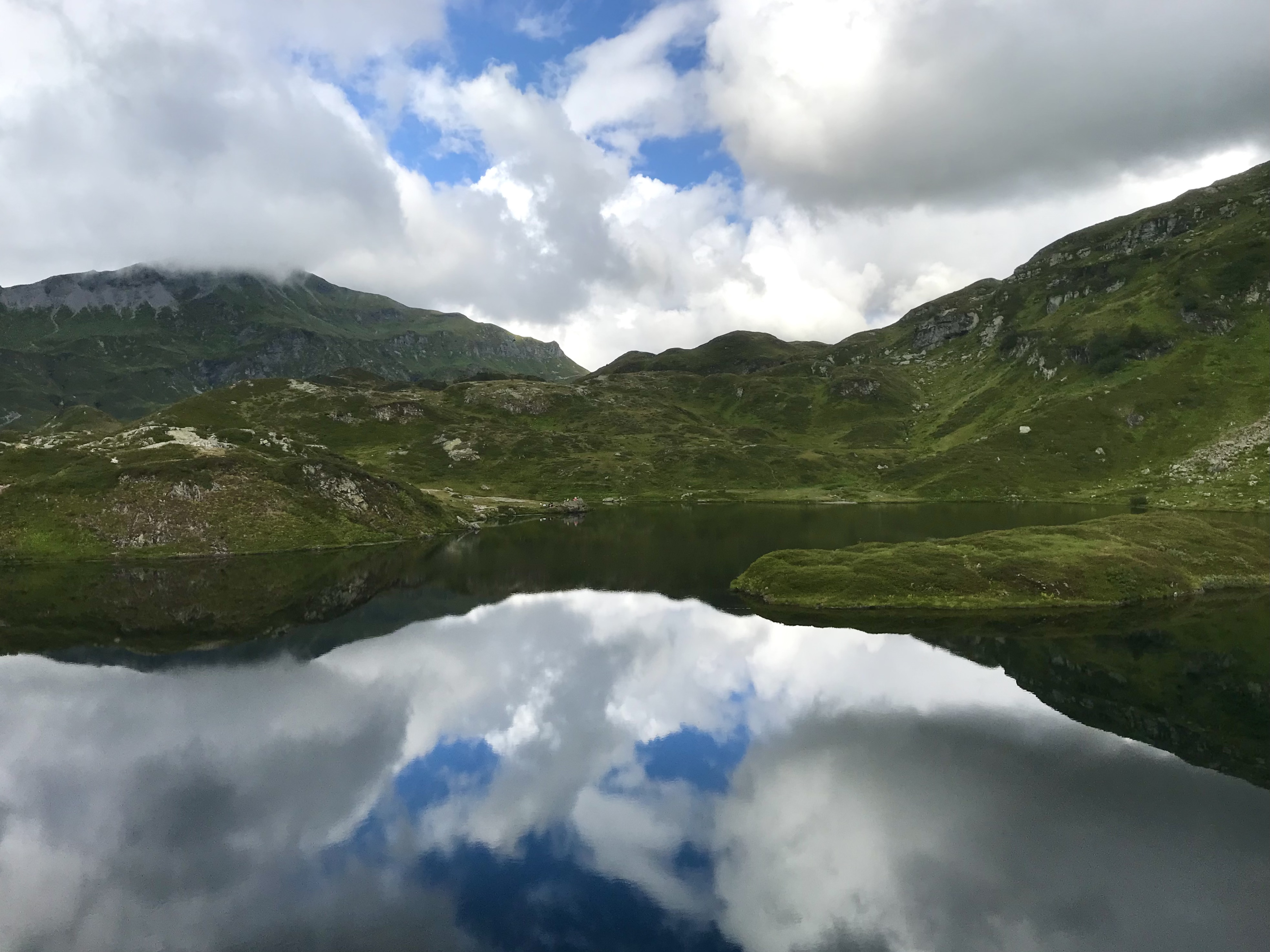
Lac de Pormenaz
