= Aiguille du Belvédère =

Mountain in France

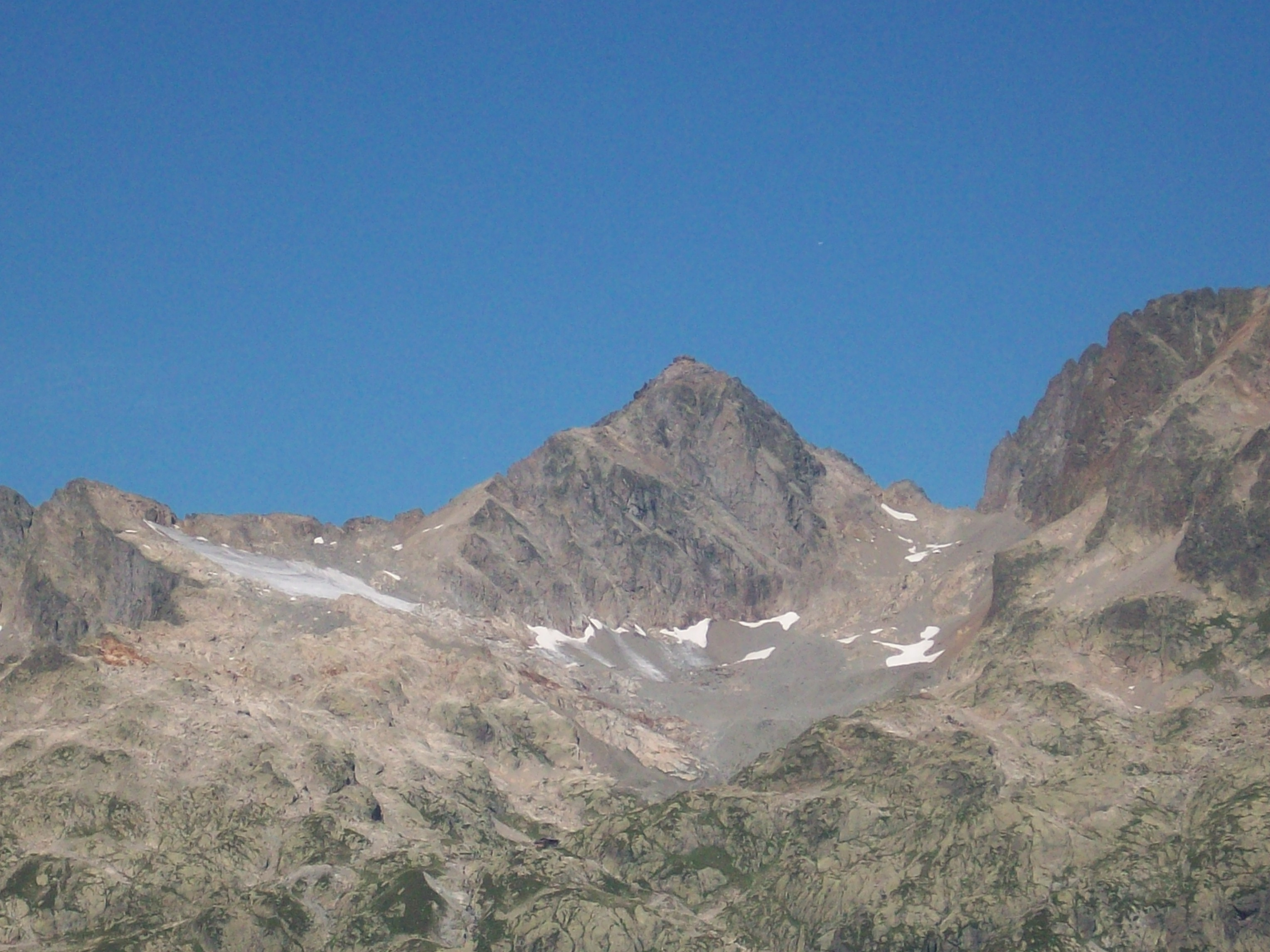
- Aiguille du Belbédère from Lognan

Highest point
- Elevation: 2,965 m (9,728 ft)
- Prominence: 505 m (1,657 ft)
- Listing: Alpine mountains 2500-2999 m
- Coordinates: 45°59′15″N 06°52′24″E

Geography
- Location within Alps
- Location of Aiguille du Belvédère Location in the Alps
- Location: Haute-Savoie, France
- Parent range: Aiguilles Rouges

Aiguille du Belvédère (French pronunciation: [ɛɡɥij dy bɛlvedɛʁ]) is a mountain of Haute-Savoie, France. It is the highest peak in the Aiguilles Rouges range of the French Prealps and has an altitude of 2,965 metres (9,728 ft) above sea level.

Lying to the northwest of Chamonix, Aiguille du Belvedere is a popular climb as its position high above the Chamonix valley provides it with fantastic views of the Mont Blanc massif to its east and the Bernese Alps to its north. Lac Blanc lies on its eastern slopes.
