= Aiguilles Rouges =

Mountainous massif of the French Prealps

Coordinates: 45°58′N 6°52′E

The Aiguilles Rouges (French pronunciation: [ɛɡɥij ʁuʒ], "Red Needles") are a crystalline mountainous massif of the French Prealps, opposite the Mont Blanc Massif. The colour of the iron-rich gneiss (metamorphic) mountains gives the range its name. The highest summit is the Aiguille du Belvédère at 2,965 metres (9,728 ft). At the southern end of the range, Le Brévent at 2,525 metres (8,284 ft) is accessible by a cable car in the Planpraz and the Brévent sections.

== Morphology ==
Unlike the massif of the Mont Blanc, the Aiguilles Rouges have no significant glaciers. The alpine stage begins around 2,000 metres (6,562 ft) with rough boulders, above which a series of broken needles spring from the Col des Montets to Le Brévent. The northwestern side of the massif has less vegetation because of its lack of exposure to the sun. The southwest face abounds in vegetation that developed from a multitude of biotopes. Amongst the typical flora hikers can discover include sundews, martagons, and wide varieties of orchids. To protect this biodiversity, the Aiguilles Rouges National Nature Reserve (Réserve naturelle des aiguilles rouges) was created in 1974, covering 3,279 ha.

The Aiguilles Rouges offer a splendid view of all the peaks of Chamonix, the glaciers of Mont Blanc, and the roof of Europe. The French artist Samivel is known for his paintings of some of these splendid views. The highest point in this range is named Belvédère (literally "beautiful viewpoint" in French) because it offers a 360° panoramic view of all the mountains surrounding the Aiguilles Rouges. The mountain path running from Planpraz to the Col des Montets via La Flégère, just above the treeline of the Aiguilles Rouges, is called Le Grand Balcon Sud (Grand Southern Balcony).

The eastern part of the range has numerous mountain lakes, of which the most remarkable is Lac Blanc at the foot of the Aiguille Belvédère.

The range is home to the principal climbing crags of Chamonix, which ascend the pinnacles of Planpraz made famous by the mountaineer Gaston Rébuffat.

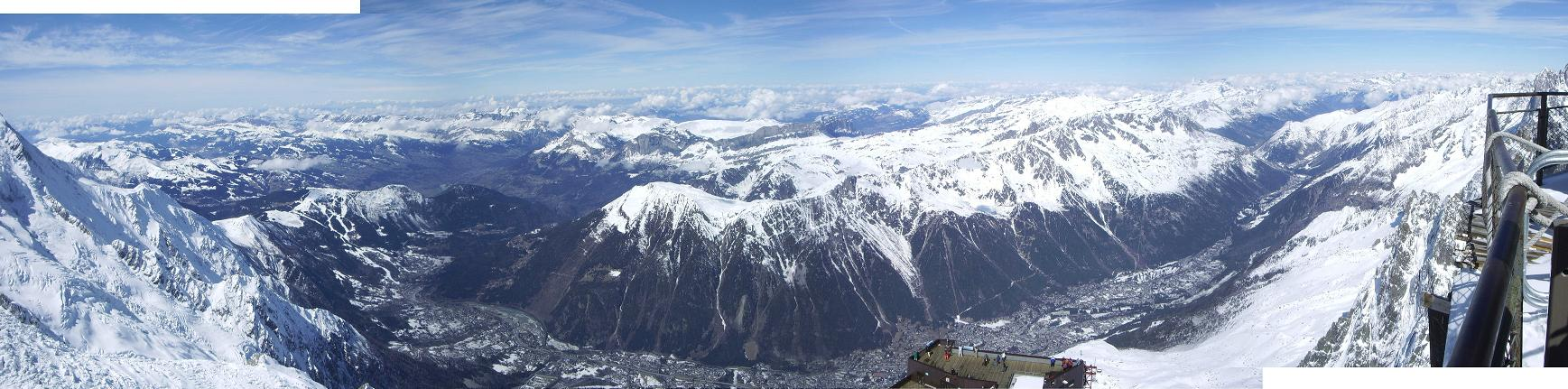
Panorama of the Aiguilles Rouges and the Arve Valley from the Aiguille du Midi.

== Main summits ==
- L'aiguille du Belvédère (2,965 meters), the highest summit of the massif;
- L'aiguille de Tête Plate (2,944 meters);
- L'aiguille de la Floria (2,888 meters);
- L'aiguille du Pouce (2,873 meters);
- L'aiguille de la Glière (2,873 meters);
- L'aiguille Pourrie (2,562 meters);
- Le Brévent (2,525 meters): at the South of the massif and accessible by a two-section cablecar ("Planpraz" and "le Brévent");
- L'aiguillette des Houches (2,312 meters).

== Lakes ==
- Lac Blanc (White Lake)
- Lac du Brévent
- Lac Cornu (Horned Lake)
- Lac Noir d'en Bas (Lower Black Lake)
- Lac de l'Aiguillette
- Lacs des Chéserys

== In fiction ==
Ian Fleming, when writing the fictional biography of James Bond, mentioned that Bond's parents were killed in a mountain climbing accident in the Aiguilles Rouges near Chamonix when the future secret agent was eleven years old. He also mentions them in his novel From Russia, with Love.
