= Lac de Divonne =

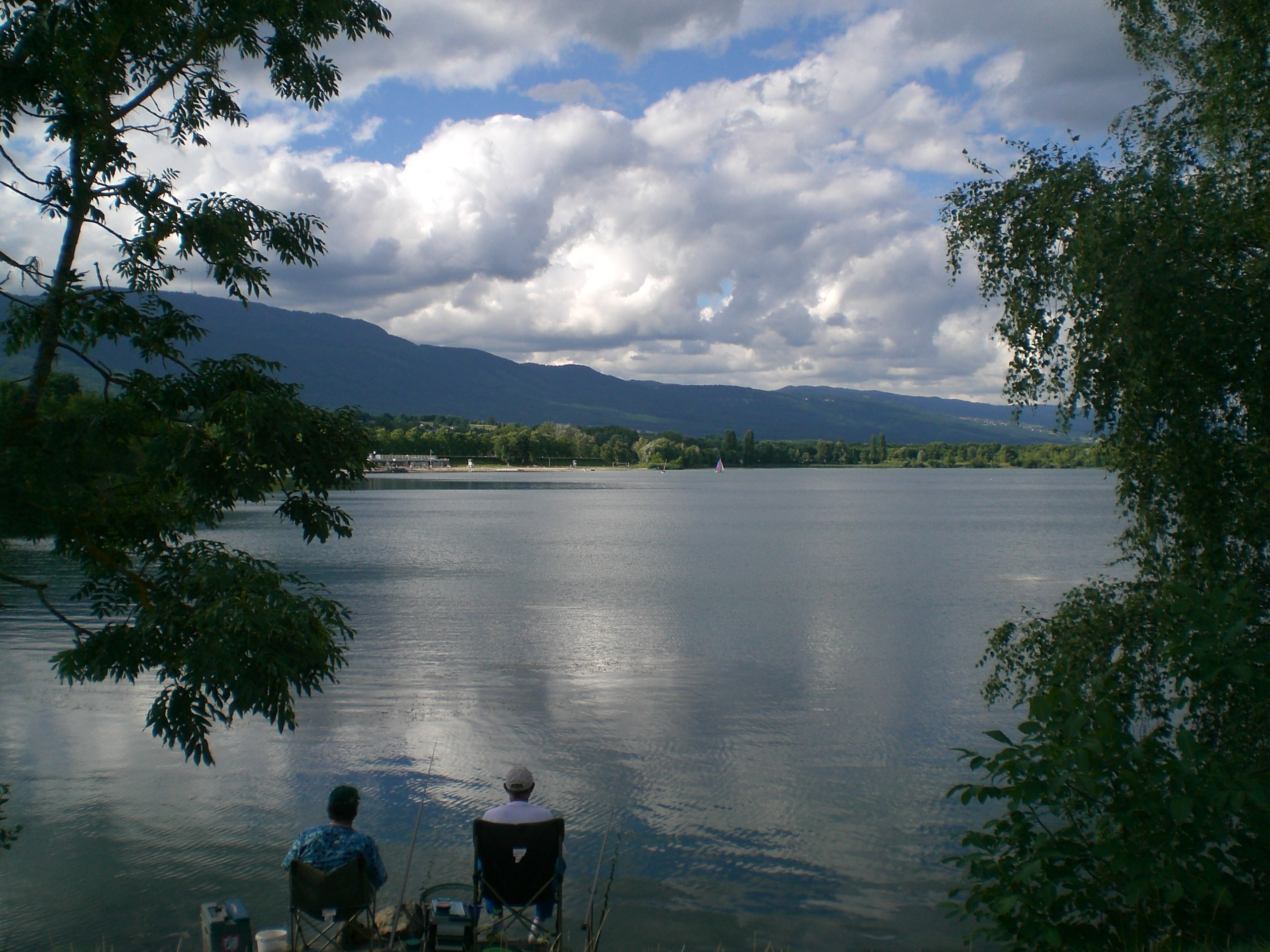

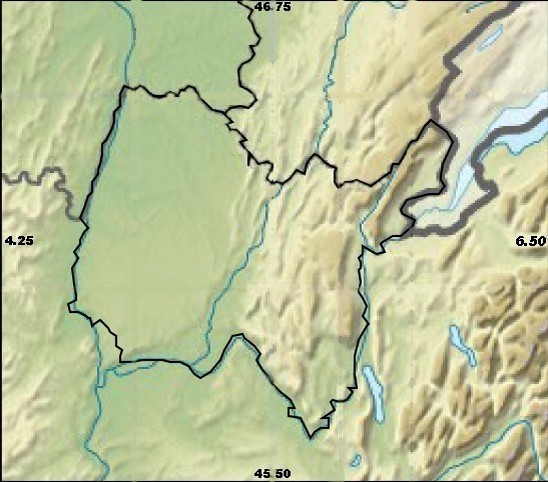
- Location within Ain
- Location: Divonne-les-Bains, Ain
- Coordinates: 46°21′20″N 6°9′10″E
- Type: artificial lake
- Basin countries: France
- Surface area: 40 ha (99 acres)
- Max. depth: 3 m (9.8 ft)
- Residence time: 100 days

Lac de Divonne is an artificial lake at Divonne-les-Bains, France. The lake has a surface area of approx. 40 ha (99 acres).
