= Lac de Lessy =

Lake in France

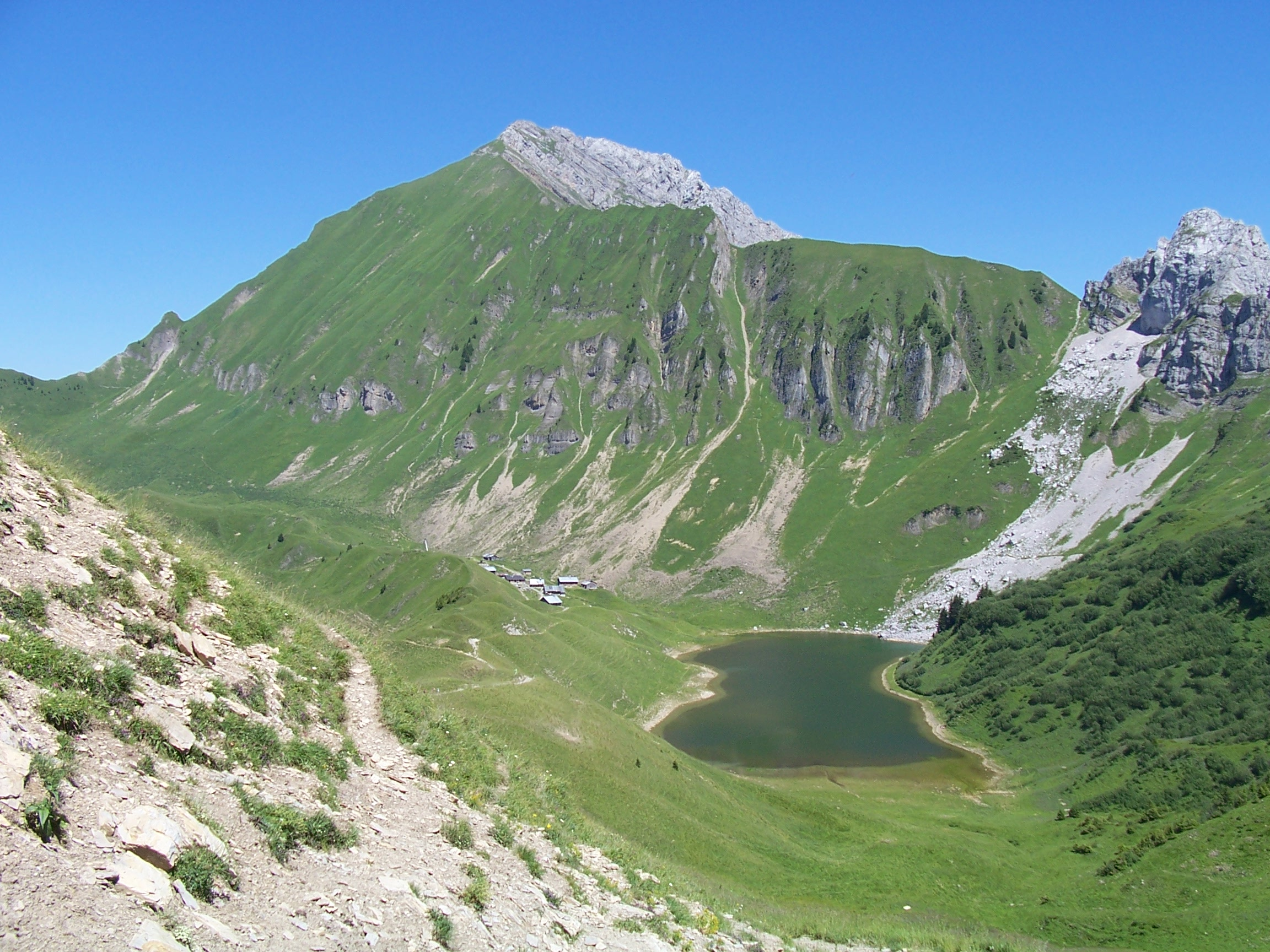

- Location within Savoie
- Location: Haute-Savoie
- Coordinates: 45°59′16″N 6°26′17″E
- Basin countries: France
- Surface area: 7.1 ha (18 acres)
- Max. depth: 1.7 m (5 ft 7 in)
- Residence time: 600 days
- Surface elevation: 1,730 m (5,680 ft)

Lac de Lessy is a lake at Le Petit-Bornand-les-Glières in the Haute-Savoie, France.
