= Lac Cornu =

Lake in Haute-Savoie, France

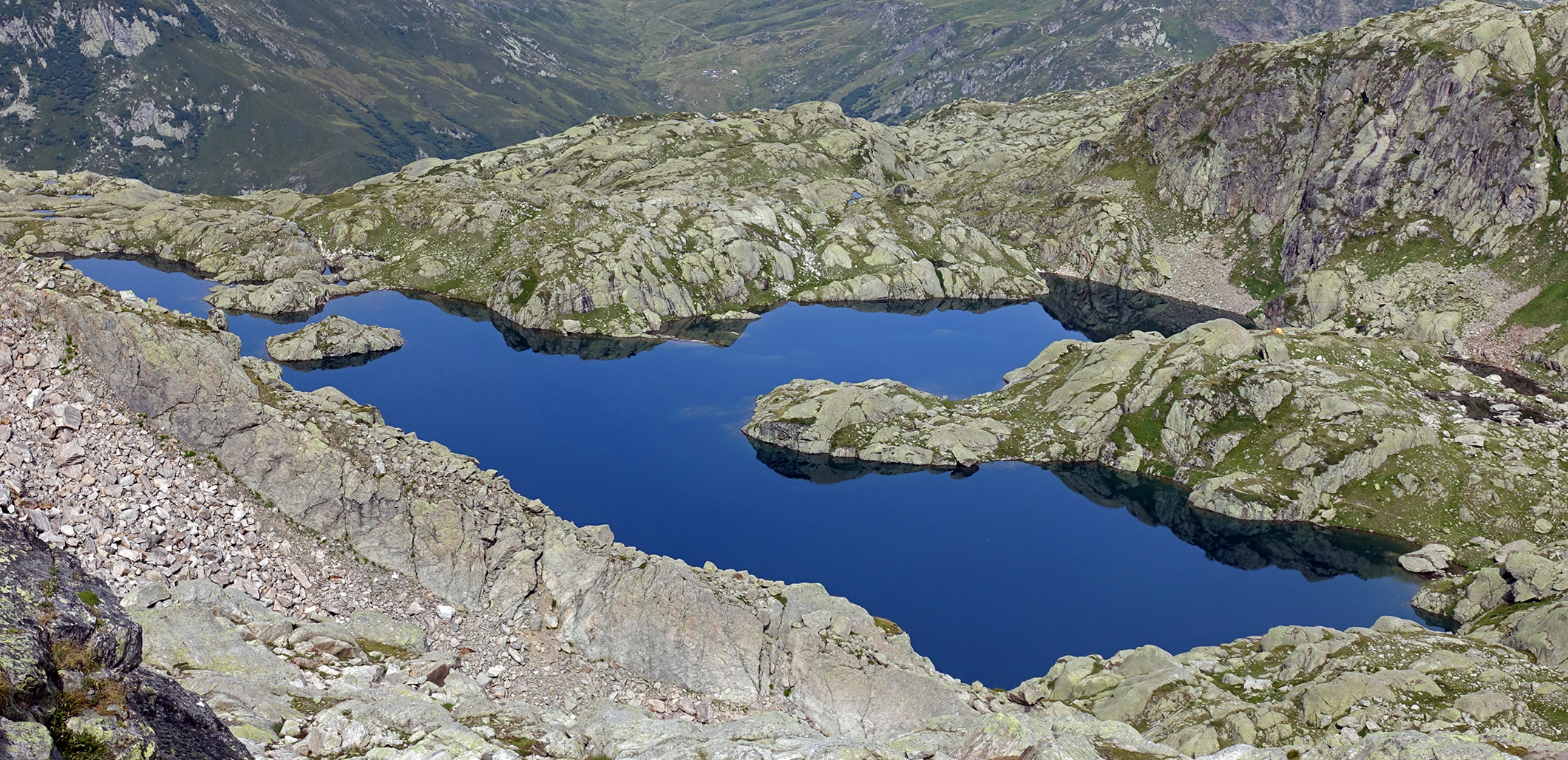

- Location within France
- Location: Chamonix-Mont-Blanc, Haute-Savoie
- Coordinates: 45°57′28″N 6°50′54″E
- Basin countries: France
- Max. length: 410 m (1,350 ft)
- Max. width: 340 m (1,120 ft)
- Surface area: 5.4 ha (13 acres)
- Max. depth: 22 m (72 ft)
- Residence time: 250 days
- Surface elevation: 2,276 m (7,467 ft)

Lac Cornu is a lake in the Aiguilles Rouges massif of Haute-Savoie, on the town of Chamonix-Mont-Blanc France. It is located at an elevation of 2,276 m with a surface area of 5.4 ha. It is snow-covered or frozen nearly 9 months of the year.

Wild ibex are often seen on the rock walls surrounding the lake.

The Lac Cornu is neighbor to the Lacs Noirs, located ten minutes away at an elevation of 2,550 m.

Petit Lac Cornu is located 500 m North West, at an elevation of 2,243 m. Its surface area is 4,700 m².

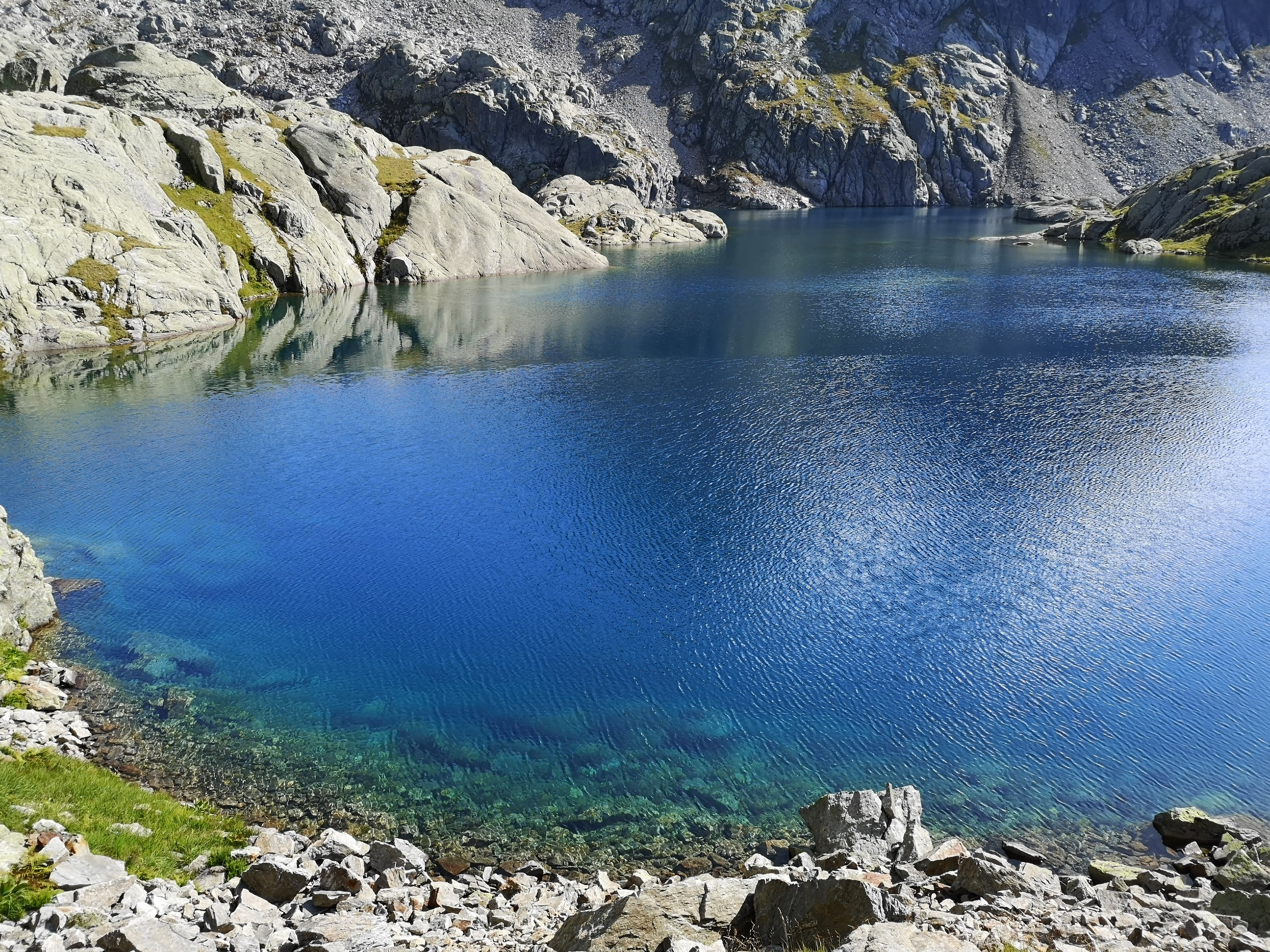
Due to its glacial origin, the water of Lake Cornu enjoys a crystalline color
