= Clairvaux-les-Lacs =

Commune in Bourgogne-Franche-Comté, France

Clairvaux-les-Lacs Clièrva (Arpitan)
- Commune
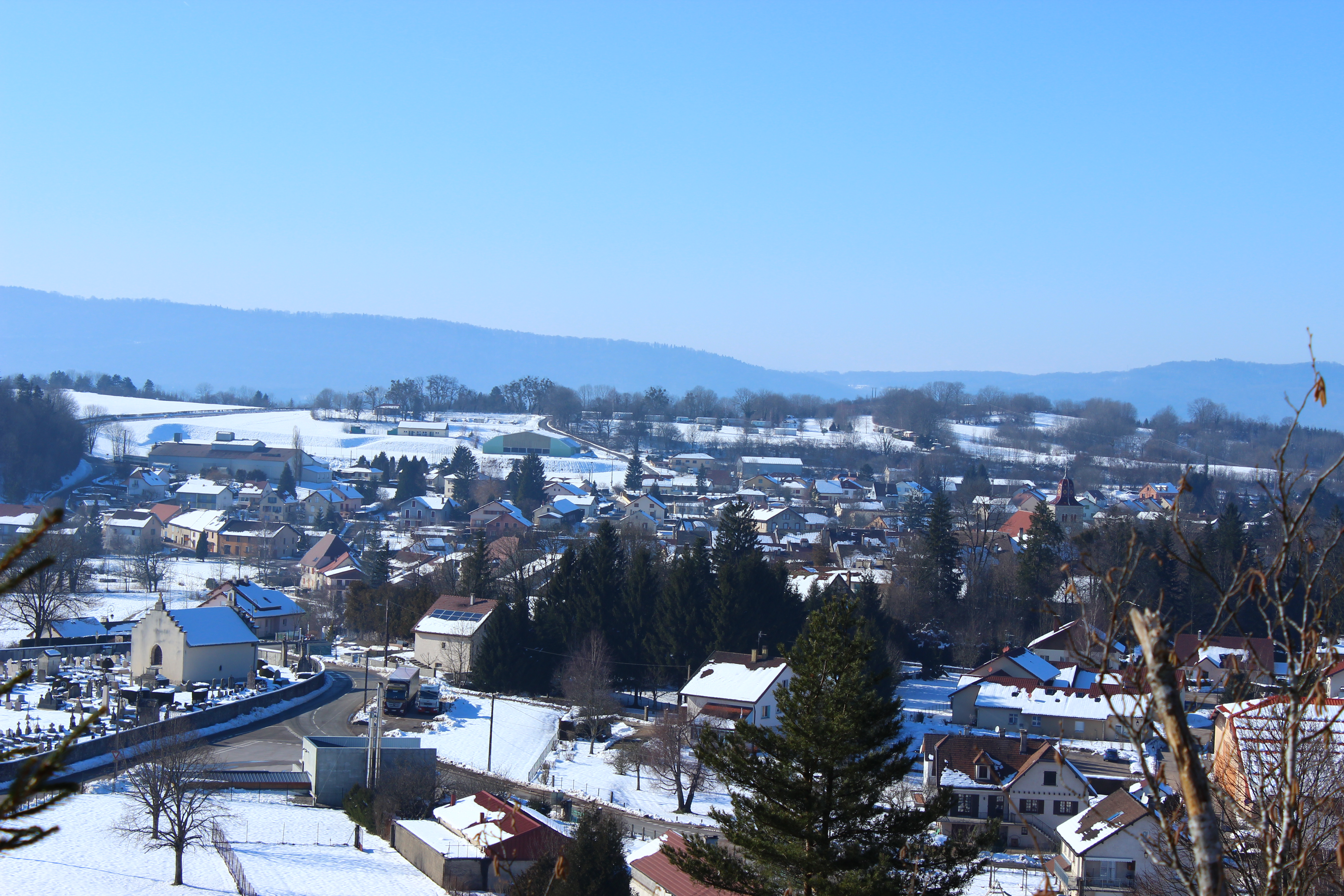
- A general view of Clairvaux-les-Lacs

- Coat of arms
- Location of Clairvaux-les-Lacs
- Location within France Location within Bourgogne-Franche-Comté
- Coordinates: 46°34′33″N 5°44′59″E
- Country: France
- Region: Bourgogne-Franche-Comté
- Department: Jura
- Arrondissement: Lons-le-Saunier
- Canton: Saint-Laurent-en-Grandvaux
- Intercommunality: CC Terre d'Émeraude

Government
  - Mayor (2020–2026): Hélène Morel-Bailly
- Area^{1}: 12.29 km^{2} (4.75 sq mi)
- Highest elevation: 826 m (2,710 ft)
- Lowest elevation: 450 m (1,480 ft)
- Population (2023): 1,426
  - Density: 116.0/km^{2} (300.5/sq mi)
- Demonym: Clairvaliens
- Time zone: UTC+01:00 (CET)
  - Summer (DST): UTC+02:00 (CEST)
- INSEE/Postal code: 39154 /39130
- Website: www.clairvaux-les-lacs.com
- ^{1} French Land Register data, which excludes lakes, ponds, glaciers > 1 km^{2} (0.386 sq mi or 247 acres) and river estuaries.

Clairvaux-les-Lacs (French pronunciation: [klɛʁvo le lak]; lit. 'Clairvaux-the-Lakes'; Arpitan: Clièrva) is a commune in the Jura department in Bourgogne-Franche-Comté in eastern France. In 1959, it absorbed the former commune Soyria.

== Population ==
Historical population
Year	Pop.	±% p.a.
1968	1,380	—
1975	1,379	−0.01%
1982	1,432	+0.54%
1990	1,361	−0.63%
1999	1,472	+0.87%
2007	1,518	+0.39%
2012	1,439	−1.06%
2017	1,451	+0.17%
2023	1,426	−0.29%
Source: INSEE

== World Heritage Site ==
It is home to one or more prehistoric pile-dwelling (or stilt house) settlements that are part of the Prehistoric Pile dwellings around the Alps UNESCO World Heritage Site.

== See also ==
- Communes of the Jura department
