= Le Brévent =

Mountain in France

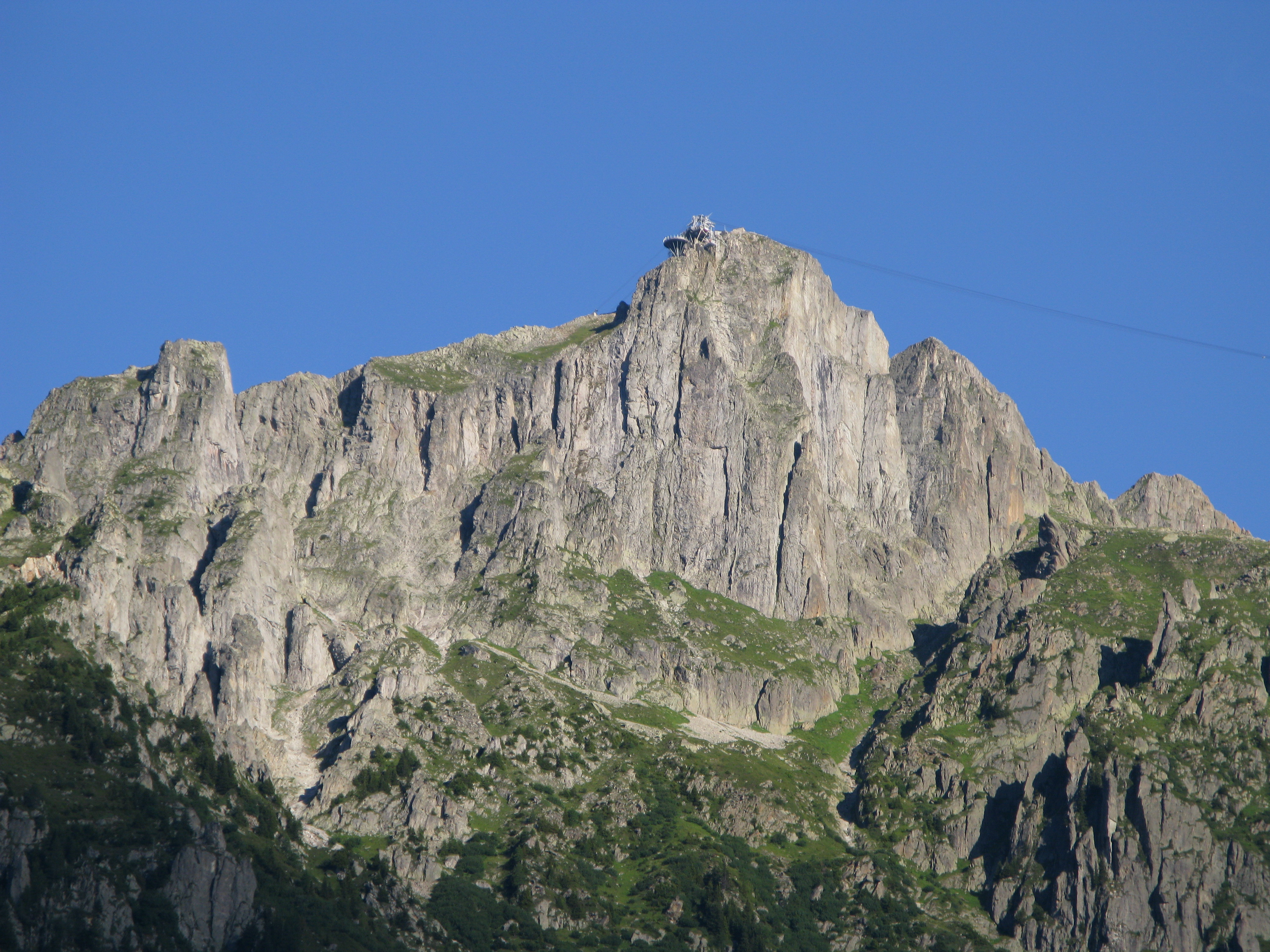

Highest point
- Elevation: 2,525 m (8,284 ft)
- Prominence: 157 m (515 ft)
- Coordinates: 45°56′03″N 06°50′16″E

Geography
- Location within Alps
- Location: Haute-Savoie, France
- Parent range: Aiguilles Rouges

Le Brévent is a mountain of Haute-Savoie, France. It lies in the Aiguilles Rouges range of the French Prealps and has an altitude of 2525 metres (8,284 Feet) above sea level. This cliff is a popular spot for wingsuit flying down into the valley.

Media related to Le Brévent at Wikimedia Commons
