= Wilersee =

Lake in the Canton of Zug, Switzerland

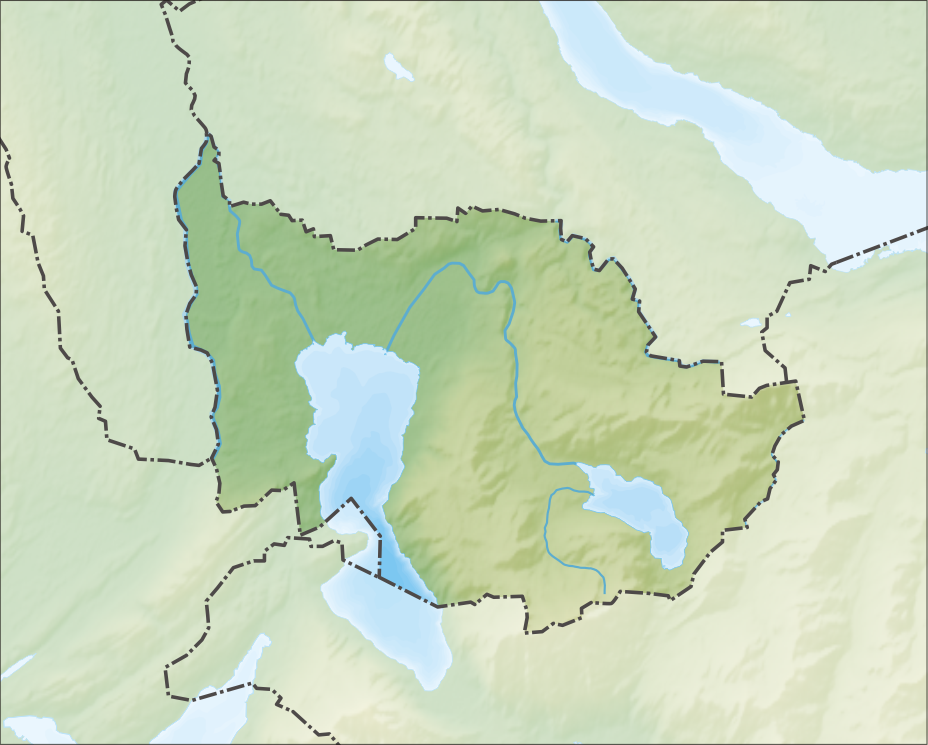
- Location within Canton of Zug Location within Switzerland Location within Alps
- Interactive map of Wilersee
- Location: Canton of Zug
- Coordinates: 47°10′16″N 8°37′08″E
- Primary inflows: Erlenmoosbach, Zulauf Sennhütte
- Catchment area: 0.58 km^{2} (0.22 sq mi)
- Basin countries: Switzerland
- Surface area: 3 ha (7.4 acres)
- Average depth: 12.3 m (40 ft)
- Max. depth: 20.8 m (68 ft)
- Residence time: 2.2 years
- Surface elevation: 729 m (2,392 ft)
- Settlements: Finstersee

Wilersee is a lake in Canton of Zug, Switzerland. It is a kettle lake. Its surface area is 3 ha (7.4 acres).
