= Mettmenhaslisee =

Lake in Zurich, Switzerland

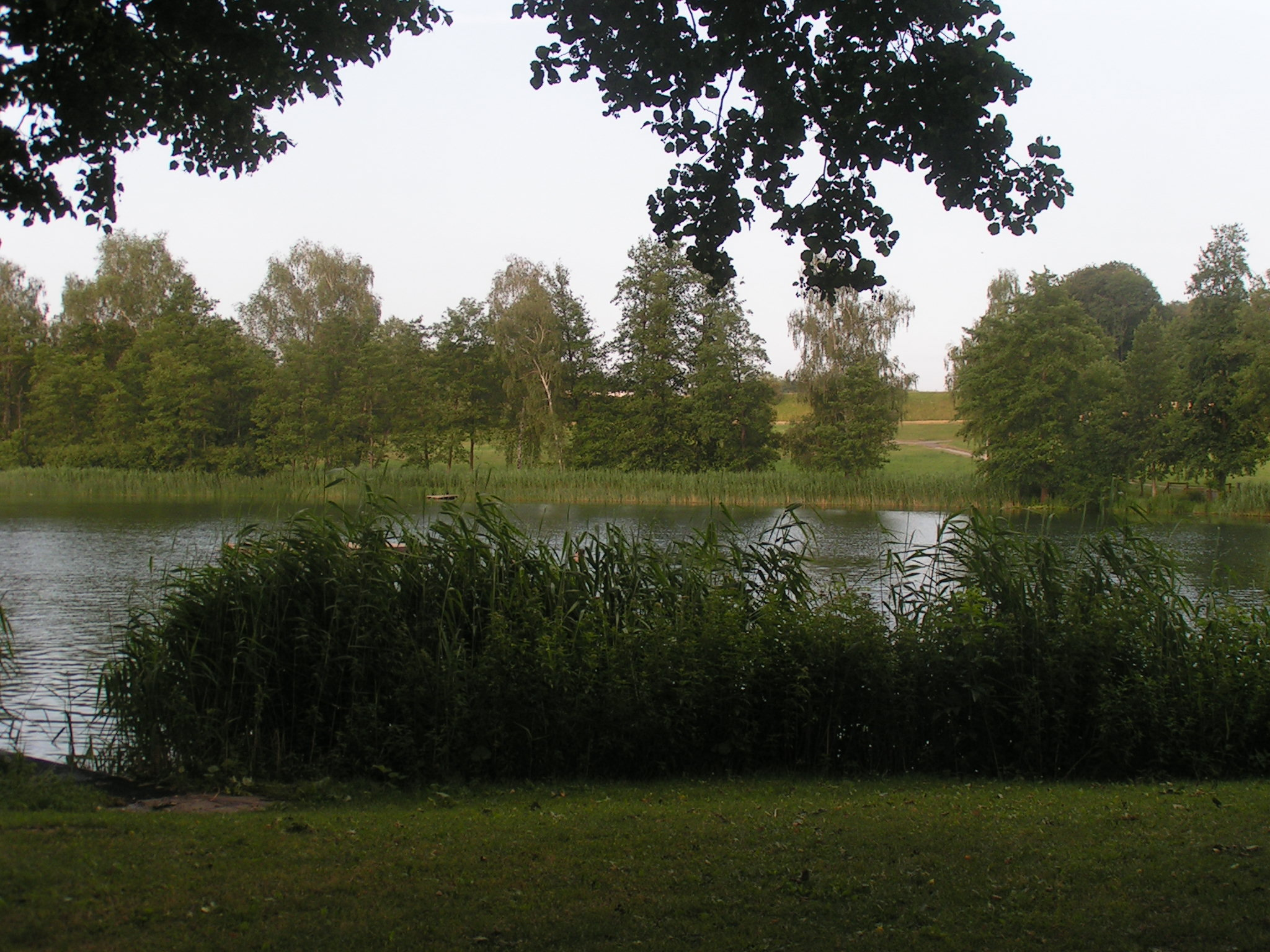

- Location within Canton of Zurich Location within Switzerland Location within Alps
- Interactive map of Mettmenhaslisee
- Location: Canton of Zurich
- Coordinates: 47°28′28″N 8°29′31″E
- Catchment area: 0.431 km^{2} (0.166 sq mi)
- Basin countries: Switzerland
- Surface area: 2.5 ha (6.2 acres)
- Average depth: 6.5 m (21 ft)
- Max. depth: 12.4 m (41 ft)
- Residence time: 180 days
- Surface elevation: 418 m (1,371 ft)

Mettmenhaslisee ,also known as Näppi, is a lake located between Niederhasli and Mettmenhasli in the Canton of Zurich, Switzerland. Its surface area is 2.5 ha (6.2 acres).
