= Long Lost Lake =

Lake in the state of Minnesota, United States

- Location within Minnesota Location within the United States
- Location: Long Lost Lake Township, Clearwater County, Minnesota
- Coordinates: 47°11′42″N 95°25′07″W
- Type: closed-basin lake
- Primary inflows: groundwater
- Primary outflows: none
- Surface area: 501 acres (200 ha)
- Residence time: 1.8 years
- Shore length^{1}: 15.46 mi (24.88 km)
- Surface elevation: 1,606.5 ft (489.7 m) (OHW)
- ^{1} Shore length is not a well-defined measure.

Long Lost Lake is located in Clearwater County, Minnesota, United States. The lake has one concrete-slab public access on its east side.

The closed-basin lake's water level rose over 13 ft (4 m) between 1993 and 2002, submerging residences, roads, and about 50 acres (20 ha) of land. From its 2002 high of 1,618 ft (493 m), its level dropped to 1,610 ft (490 m) by 2025. Ordinary High Water Level (OHW) elevation is 1,606.5 ft (489.7 m).

The Minnesota Department of Natural Resources stocked the lake with approximately 275,000 walleye fry most years between 2016 and 2024.

The 54-acre Long Lost Lake Wildlife Management Area is located on the east side of the lake and the smaller 20-acre Long Lost Lake South WMA is on its south shore.
