= Lac d'Anterne =

Lake in France

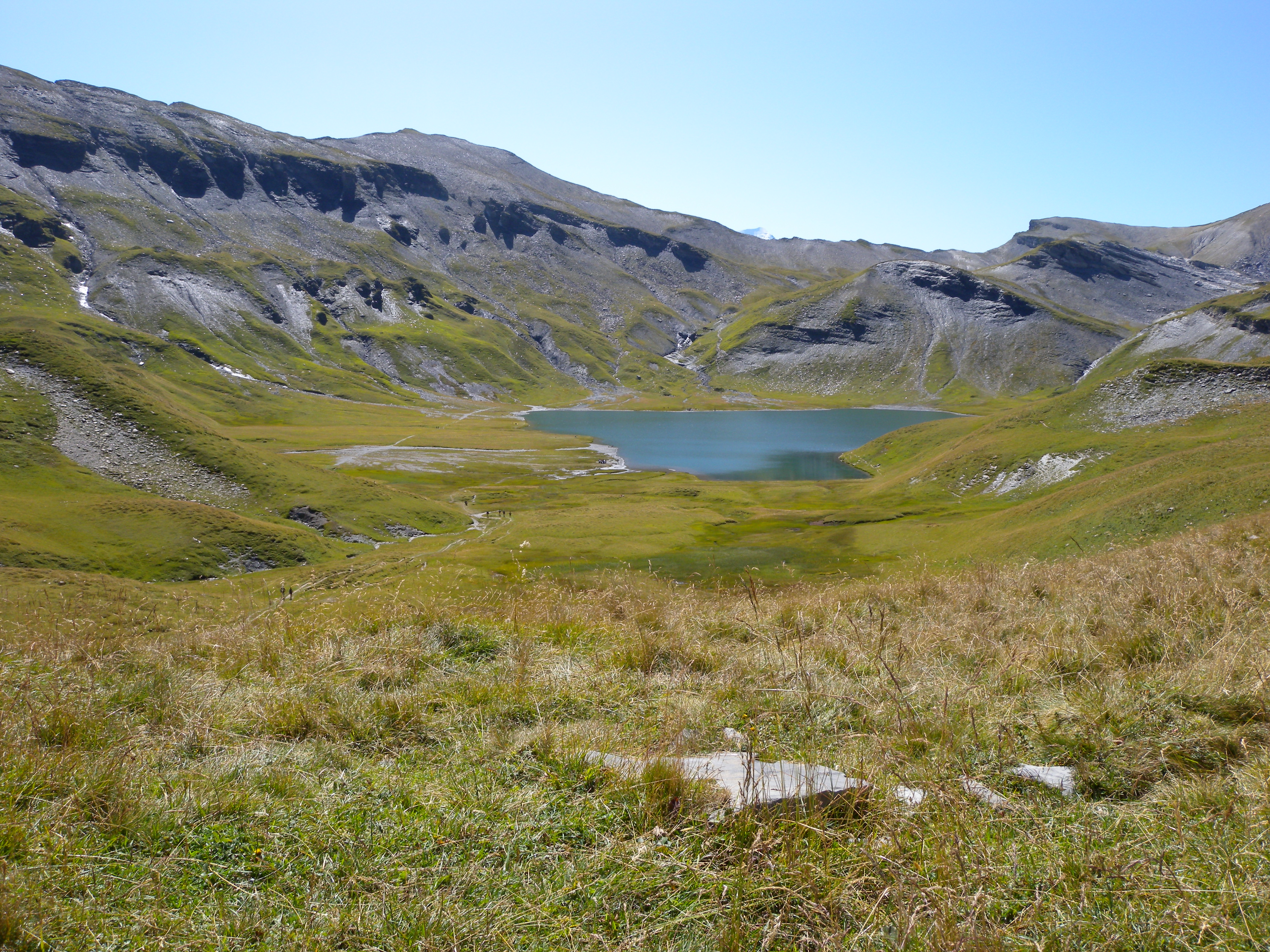

- Location within France
- Location: Passy, Haute-Savoie
- Coordinates: 45°59′30″N 6°47′50″E
- Basin countries: France
- Surface area: 11.6 ha (29 acres)
- Max. depth: 13.2 m (43 ft)
- Water volume: 760,000 m^{3} (620 acre⋅ft)
- Residence time: 90 days
- Surface elevation: 2,063 m (6,768 ft)

Lac d'Anterne is a lake near Sixt-Fer-à-Cheval, in the commune of Passy in the Haute-Savoie department of France. It is located in the Sixt-Passy nature preserve.
