= Lac du Brévent =

Lake in France

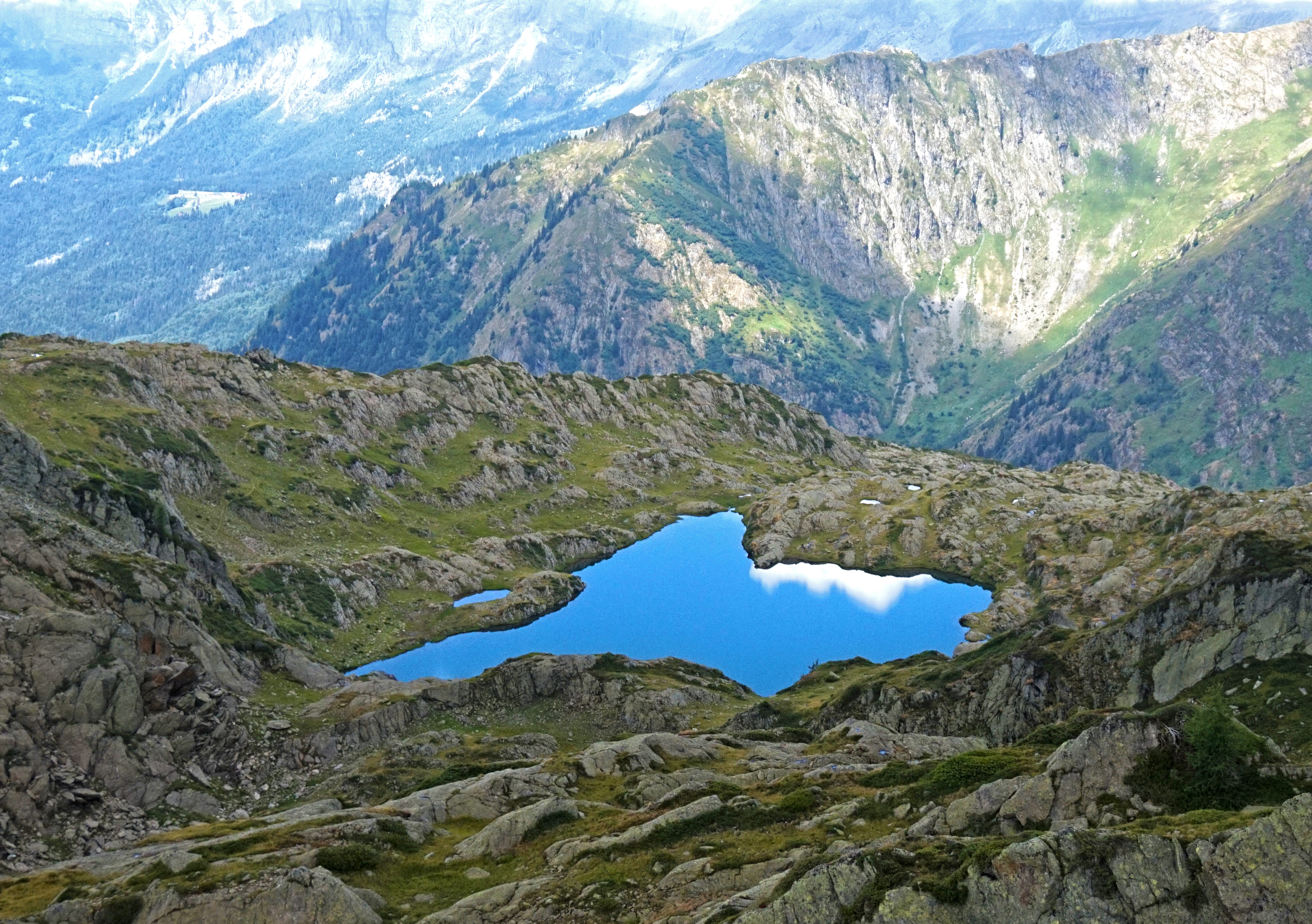

- Location within France
- Location: Chamonix, Haute-Savoie
- Coordinates: 45°55′45″N 6°49′40″E
- Basin countries: France
- Surface area: 2.4 ha (5.9 acres)
- Max. depth: 20 m (66 ft)
- Residence time: 250 days
- Surface elevation: 2,125 m (6,972 ft)

Lac du Brévent is a lake in the municipality of Chamonix, Haute-Savoie, France. It is located below the Le Brévent peak, at an elevation of approx. 2125 m.
