= Divonne-les-Bains =

Commune in Auvergne-Rhône-Alpes, France

Divonne-les-Bains Digouona (Arpitan)
- Commune
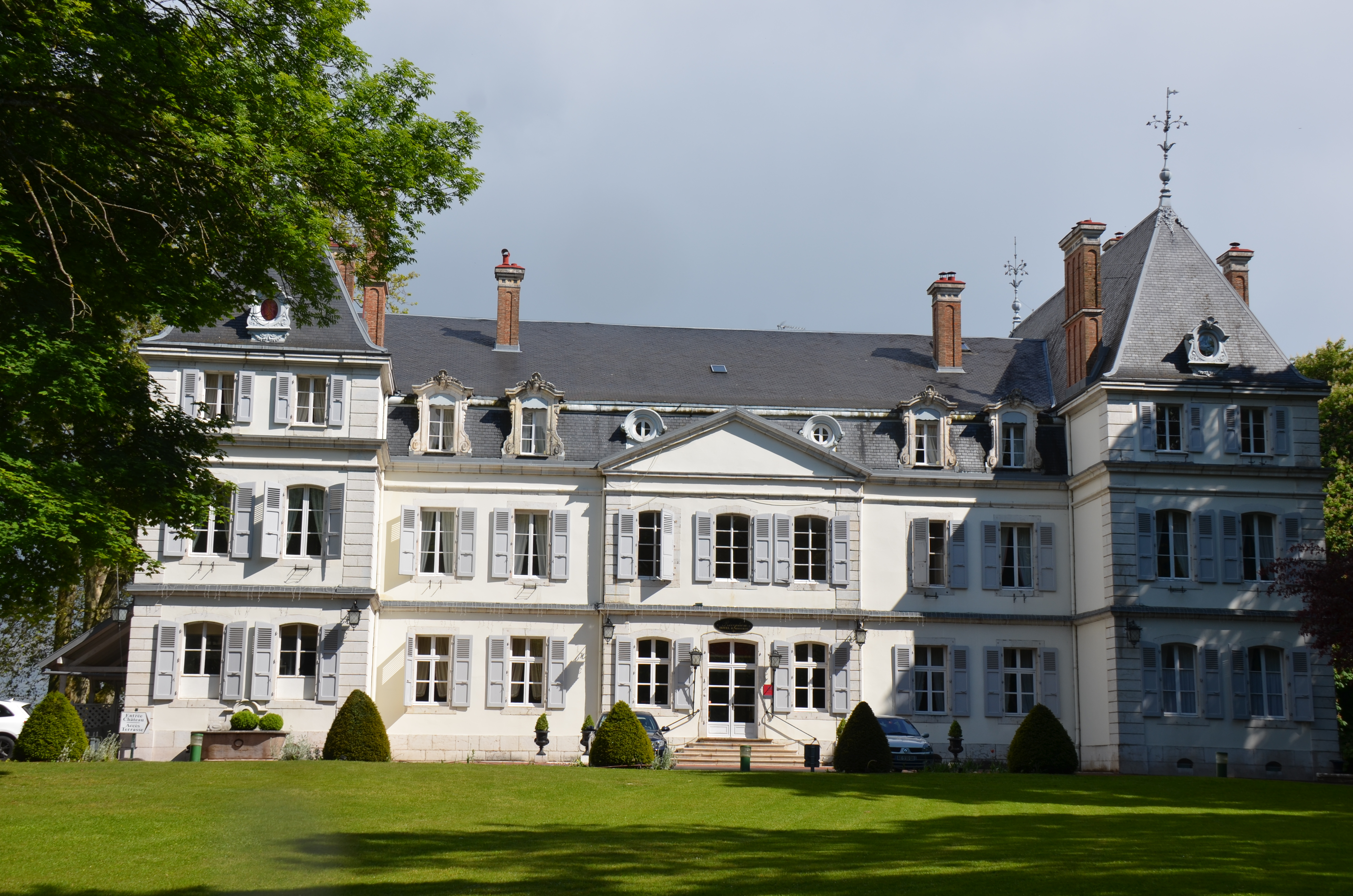
- Château de Divonne

- Coat of arms
- Location of Divonne-les-Bains
- Location within France Location within Auvergne-Rhône-Alpes
- Coordinates: 46°21′24″N 6°08′34″E
- Country: France
- Region: Auvergne-Rhône-Alpes
- Department: Ain
- Arrondissement: Gex
- Canton: Gex
- Intercommunality: CA du Pays de Gex

Government
  - Mayor (2026–32): Vincent Scattolin
- Area^{1}: 33.88 km^{2} (13.08 sq mi)
- Elevation: 509 m (1,670 ft)
- Highest elevation: 1,447 m (4,747 ft)
- Lowest elevation: 464 m (1,522 ft)
- Population (2023): 10,464
  - Density: 308.9/km^{2} (799.9/sq mi)
- Demonym: Divonnais
- Time zone: UTC+01:00 (CET)
  - Summer (DST): UTC+02:00 (CEST)
- INSEE/Postal code: 01143 /01220
- Website: www.divonnelesbains.fr
- ^{1} French Land Register data, which excludes lakes, ponds, glaciers > 1 km^{2} (0.386 sq mi or 247 acres) and river estuaries.

Divonne-les-Bains (French pronunciation: [divɔn le bɛ̃]; lit. 'Divonne-the-Baths'; Arpitan: Digouona), or simply Divonne, is a commune in the Ain department in the Auvergne-Rhône-Alpes region in Eastern France.

Divonne-les-Bains is a spa town situated on the border with French-speaking Switzerland, between the foot of the Jura Mountains and Lake Geneva. It is situated in the Pays de Gex, about 8 km (5.0 mi) from Gex to the southwest, from which the area takes its name. Divonne-les-Bains is about 20 km (12 mi) from Geneva to the south and 10 km (6.2 mi) from Nyon to the northeast. Since 2012, Divonne-les-Bains has formed part of a wider agglomeration known as the Grand Genève (Greater Geneva). A short way above the town are several springs, which were exploited in the 19th century to provide spa facilities for which Divonne-les-Bains became renowned. The golf course was built in the 1930s. Many of its present-day amenities (casino, hippodrome, open air swimming pool, as well as the Lac de Divonne, an artificial lake) were built after 1945. The Casino de Divonne was opened in 1954. A cultural centre by the lake (L'Esplanade du Lac) was completed in 2005.

Divonne-les-Bains used to host a small chamber music festival every summer, centred on its tiny theatre and the Domaine de Divonne. The Château of Divonne, now a luxury hotel, suffered a serious fire in January 2017; it is currently being rebuilt. There is a lively market on Sundays and a succession of cultural and sporting events throughout the year. Every year, the town hosts a folk festival in the beginning of July at the hippodrome called Les Vaches Folks.

== Etymology ==
A number of etymologies have been suggested:

- Divona, Devona: the name of a Gaulish goddess of a sacred spring providing water for the city that is now Bordeaux, invoked in a 4th-century Latin poem by Ausonius. The Latin quatrain was engraved on a stone tablet above a spring at Divonne in the nineteenth century by persons supposing that Divonne was referred to. It can still be seen near the casino.
- Conflation of the Latin word divis (rich, abundant) and the word ona or ana, for a flowing river (as in the Rhône).
- Conflation of the Celtic word vonne (a source) and di (abundant).
- Fancifully, divine + eau (divine water).

== History ==
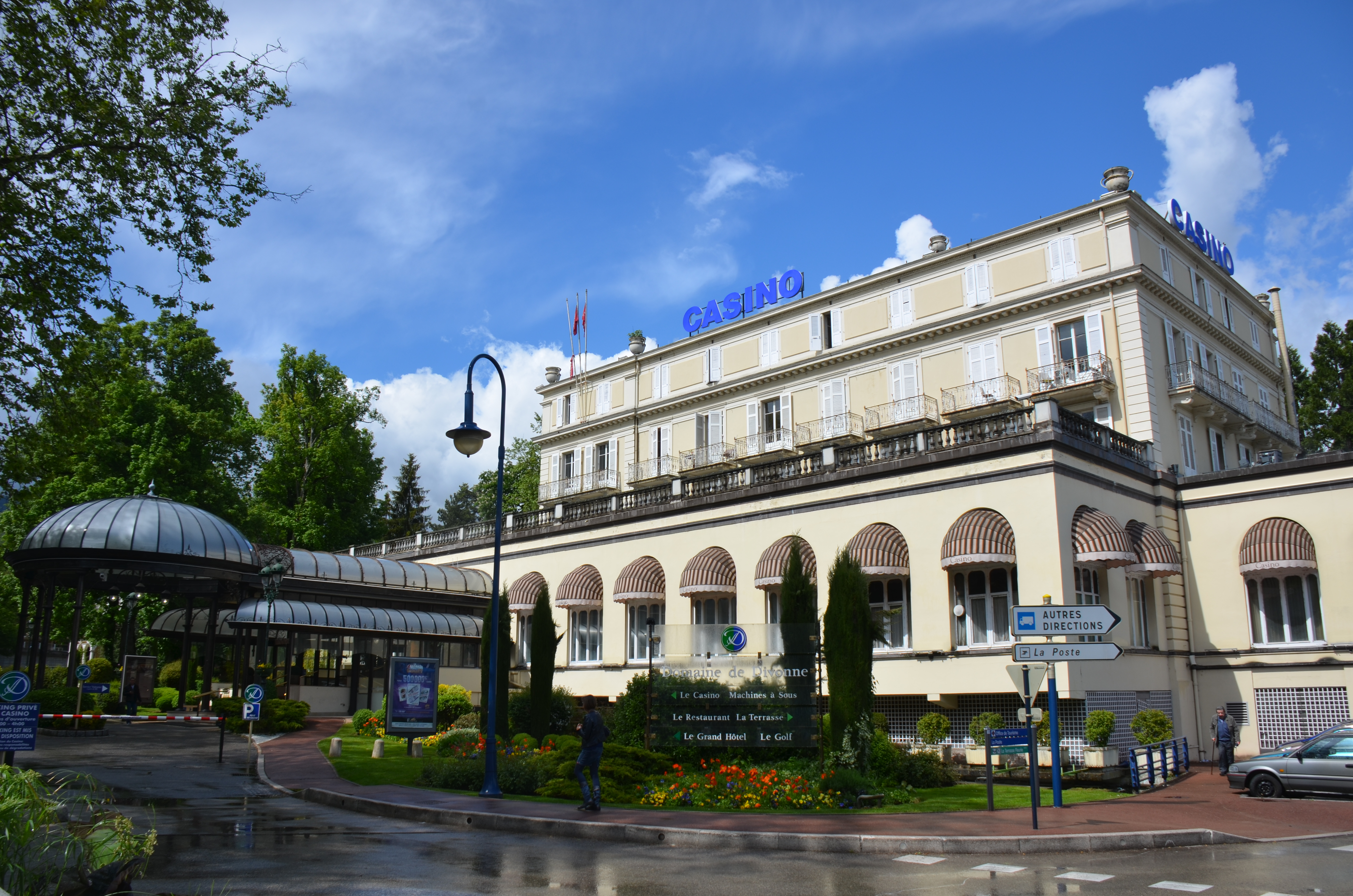
Casino in Divonne-les-Bains

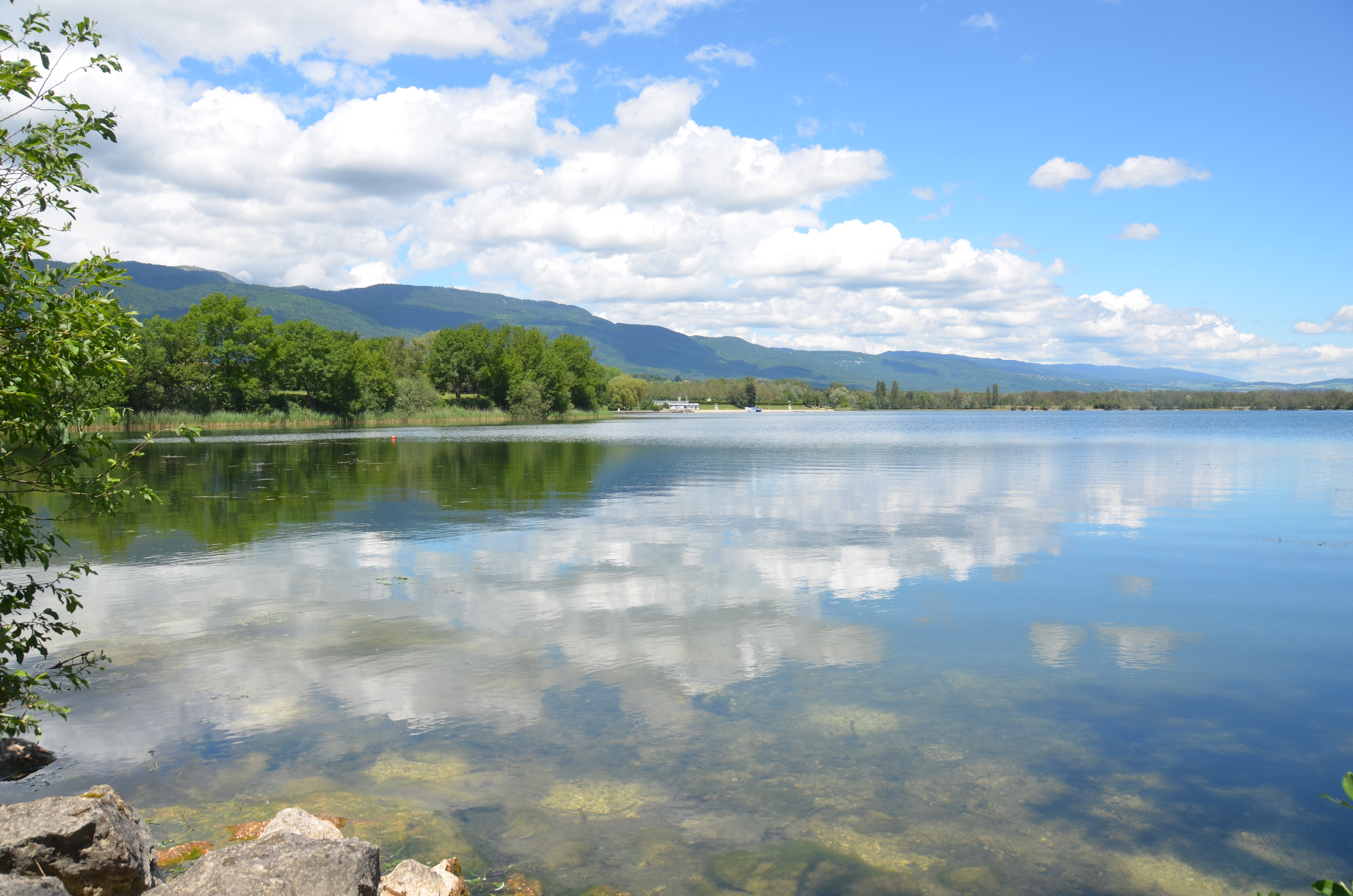
The Lac de Divonne

From the 2nd century BC the Romans progressively conquered and settled area north of the Alps and west to Lake Geneva. Julius Caesar decisively defeated the local Helvetii in 58 BC. Roman settlements flourished in Nyon and Geneva.

The natural springs of Divonne were appreciated by the Romans, who built an aqueduct of about 11 km from Divonne to Nyon to supply water to their garrison. Many traces of this aqueduct have been found; they continue to be excavated, often as new building developments are undertaken.

In the Middle Ages, Divonne's name emerged, as a parish and in the context of its fortified castle and feudal owners. In the 12th century the parish of Divonne was part of the Diocese of Geneva. By the beginning of the 12th century the Lords of Divonne, in the fiefdom of the lords of Gex, had constructed a fortified castle, on the site of the present Château de Divonne.

In 1225 Amadeus II, the Lord of Gex gifted the fiefdom of Divonne to the monastery of Saint-Claude. Sixty years later in 1285, Léonète, the Lady of Gex, alongside her son Pierre, successfully petitioned Amadeus V of Savoy for the return of the castle to their possessions.

The Lord of Divonne in 1356 was Amé II de Joinville, whose daughter Aymonette married Jacques de Gingins. Her descendant, Laurent de Gignins, was the last of his line to be Lord of Divonne. He had married Jeanne de Symond, and following his death in 1653, she married Gilbert I de La Forest of Savoy. She bequeathed the Divonne estate to him; it was retained in the family until the French Revolution in 1789.

Although the French Revolution deprived the aristocracy of much of their assets, Louis de la Forest was able recover some of his land including forests in the Jura, and in 1827 he was named as a hereditary member of the Chambre des pairs (Chamber of Peers) under the constitution of the Bourbon Restoration. During the 18th century the old castle was demolished and the present château built. At that time the population of Divonne was just over 1,000.

== Geography ==
=== Climate ===
Divonne-les-Bains has an oceanic climate (Köppen climate classification Cfb). The average annual temperature in Divonne-les-Bains is 10.5 °C (50.9 °F). The average annual rainfall is 1,129.8 mm (44.48 in) with December as the wettest month. The temperatures are highest on average in July, at around 20.0 °C (68.0 °F), and lowest in January, at around 1.8 °C (35.2 °F). The highest temperature ever recorded in Divonne-les-Bains was 39.3 °C (102.7 °F) on 19 July 2022; the coldest temperature ever recorded was −16.5 °C (2.3 °F) on 5 February 2012.

Climate data for Divonne-les-Bains (1991−2020 normals, extremes 2003−present)
Month	Jan	Feb	Mar	Apr	May	Jun	Jul	Aug	Sep	Oct	Nov	Dec	Year
Record high °C (°F)	17.0 (62.6)	21.0 (69.8)	23.3 (73.9)	28.5 (83.3)	32.0 (89.6)	36.5 (97.7)	39.3 (102.7)	39.2 (102.6)	33.5 (92.3)	27.5 (81.5)	23.1 (73.6)	16.0 (60.8)	39.3 (102.7)
Mean daily maximum °C (°F)	5.6 (42.1)	7.1 (44.8)	11.6 (52.9)	16.9 (62.4)	20.3 (68.5)	24.8 (76.6)	27.5 (81.5)	26.3 (79.3)	22.3 (72.1)	16.3 (61.3)	10.2 (50.4)	5.8 (42.4)	16.2 (61.2)
Daily mean °C (°F)	1.8 (35.2)	2.5 (36.5)	5.9 (42.6)	10.3 (50.5)	13.9 (57.0)	17.9 (64.2)	20.0 (68.0)	19.1 (66.4)	15.6 (60.1)	11.1 (52.0)	5.9 (42.6)	2.2 (36.0)	10.5 (50.9)
Mean daily minimum °C (°F)	−2.0 (28.4)	−2.2 (28.0)	0.2 (32.4)	3.8 (38.8)	7.4 (45.3)	11.1 (52.0)	12.6 (54.7)	11.9 (53.4)	8.9 (48.0)	5.8 (42.4)	1.7 (35.1)	−1.4 (29.5)	4.8 (40.6)
Record low °C (°F)	−15.5 (4.1)	−16.5 (2.3)	−14.5 (5.9)	−6.9 (19.6)	−2.5 (27.5)	1.5 (34.7)	5.0 (41.0)	4.0 (39.2)	0.0 (32.0)	−6.0 (21.2)	−14.0 (6.8)	−15.0 (5.0)	−16.5 (2.3)
Average precipitation mm (inches)	112.9 (4.44)	80.7 (3.18)	86.5 (3.41)	75.8 (2.98)	98.4 (3.87)	98.4 (3.87)	82.6 (3.25)	93.0 (3.66)	68.5 (2.70)	103.7 (4.08)	102.0 (4.02)	127.3 (5.01)	1,129.8 (44.48)
Average precipitation days (≥ 1.0 mm)	10.8	8.8	10.0	8.7	11.9	9.3	9.4	9.2	7.5	9.8	10.0	11.3	116.7
Source: Météo-France

== Population ==
Historical population

Year	Pop.	±% p.a.
1793	1,185	—
1821	1,301	+0.33%
1846	1,385	+0.25%
1872	1,472	+0.23%
1901	1,665	+0.43%
1926	1,721	+0.13%
1946	1,721	+0.00%
1962	2,516	+2.40%
1968	3,276	+4.50%

Year	Pop.	±% p.a.
1975	4,238	+3.75%
1982	4,783	+1.74%
1990	5,580	+1.95%
1999	6,171	+1.12%
2007	7,572	+2.59%
2012	8,615	+2.61%
2017	9,644	+2.28%
2023	10,464	+1.37%

Source: EHESS and INSEE (1968–2023)

== Politics ==
Divonne-les-Bains is a historically right-wing town. Its current mayor, Vincent Scattolin (miscellaneous right), has been in office since 2019. He succeeded Étienne Blanc, who was elected to the Senate in 2020 and sits in The Republicans group.

== Transport ==
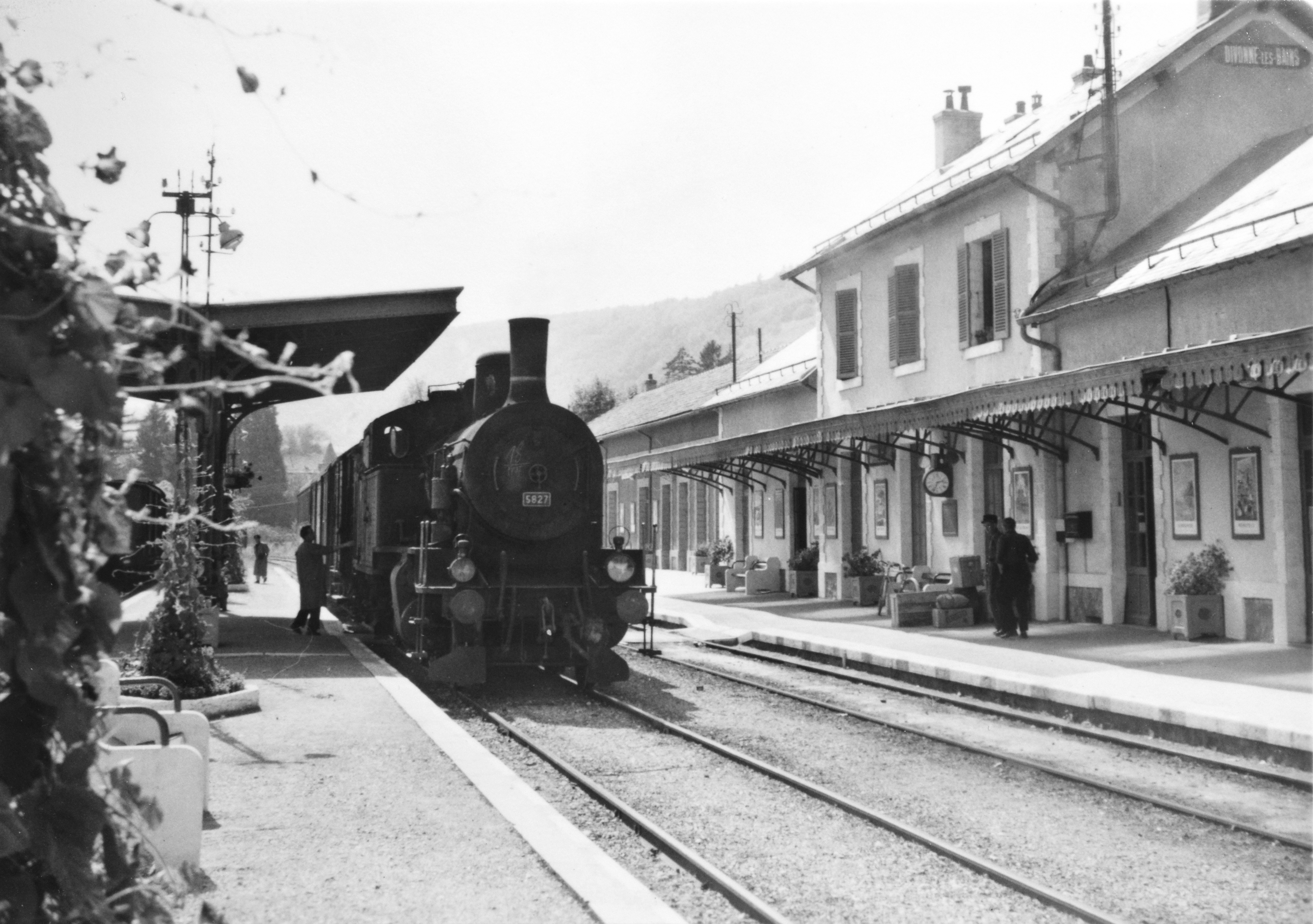
Divonne-les-Bains station in 1961

Divonne-les-Bains was the terminus of a railway line linking it to Gex and Bellegarde, as well as eventually to Paris. The line from Bellegarde, which was inaugurated in 1889, was closed by the SNCF in 1980, against the will of the Ain departmental administration. From 1905, Divonne-les-Bains was also linked by rail to Nyon, via Crassier, Vaud on the France–Switzerland border. The line was closed during the Second World War, re-opened in 1949 and finally closed again in 1962. Divonne-les-Bains station can still be seen in the town centre, although its future is now in some doubt as the municipal council has voted in favour of redeveloping the area surrounding and including the station. An SNCF administrative office still functions in the station for the purchase of tickets from any SNCF departure point.

Since 2012 a bus service operates connecting Divonne-les-Bains to the Swiss rail network at Coppet, offering a fast link to Geneva. A regular bus service also runs between Divonne-les-Bains and Bellegarde.

== Economy ==
The historical economy of the settlement of Divonne and its surroundings in the Pays de Gex was one of agriculture and forestry. The Divonne river provided power for water mills; it is said that the present-day thermal spa is built on the site of a diamond-cutting works, powered by a water wheel on the Divonne river. It was in the 19th century that Divonne's potential as a Spa was recognised.

At the present time, Divonne-les-Bains derives much of its prosperity from tourism and the casino. It also acts as a dormitory town for many who work across the border in the nearby conurbations of Geneva and Lausanne. There are weekly markets in the town on Friday and Sunday.

== Recreation ==
The town is well provided with recreational facilities including a 50 m open-air swimming pool, football pitches, tennis club, golf course, as well as a 3.3 km path around the artificial lake for walkers and cyclists, with exercise points. Along a path between the lake and the hippodrome is a scale representation of the Sun and planets of the Solar System. Each planet is shown with its astrological symbol and a brief summary of its composition, mass, density distance from the Sun and size relative to the Sun.

== See also ==
- Communes of the Ain department
- Lac de Divonne
