= Lac Blanc (Chamonix) =

Lake in France

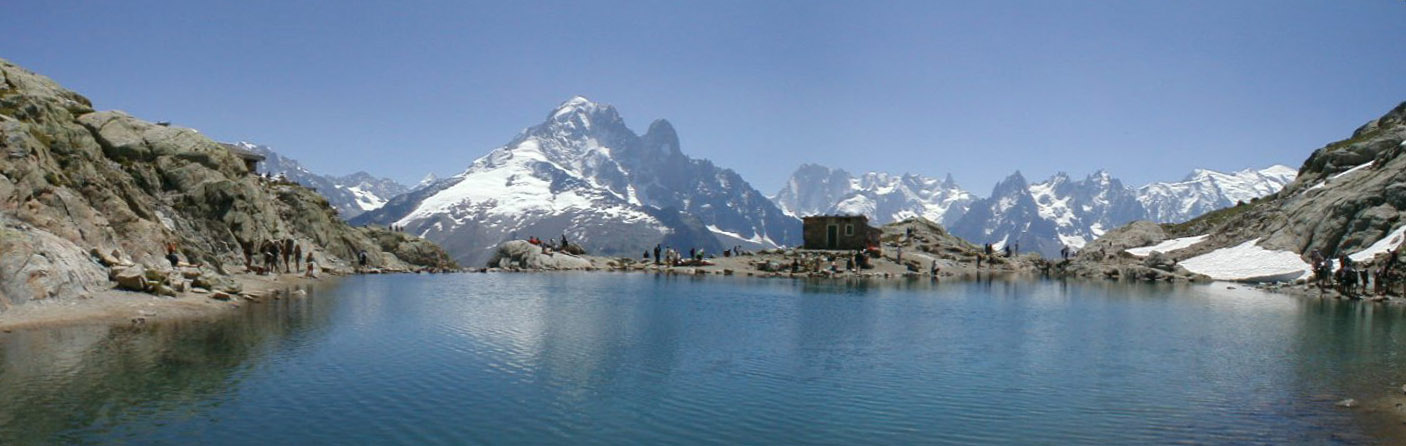

- Location within France
- Location: Chamonix-Mont-Blanc, Haute-Savoie
- Coordinates: 45°58′56″N 6°53′22″E
- Basin countries: France
- Surface elevation: 2,352 m (7,717 ft)

Lac Blanc is a lake in Chamonix-Mont-Blanc, Haute-Savoie, France.

Found in the Red Needles Nature reserve.
