= Superserien =

American football league in Sweden

- Sport: American football
- Founded: 1984
- No. of teams: 6–8
- Country: Sweden
- Most recent champion: Tyresö Royal Crowns
- Most titles: Stockholm Mean Machines
- Relegation to: Swedish American Football Division 1
- Website: www.Amerikanskfotboll.com

Superserien is the highest level of American football in Sweden, founded 1984 and became official in 1991. The number of teams in the top league has varied through the years, ranging from four to ten.

== Superserien 2026 ==
The Superserien 2026 will feature 8 teams

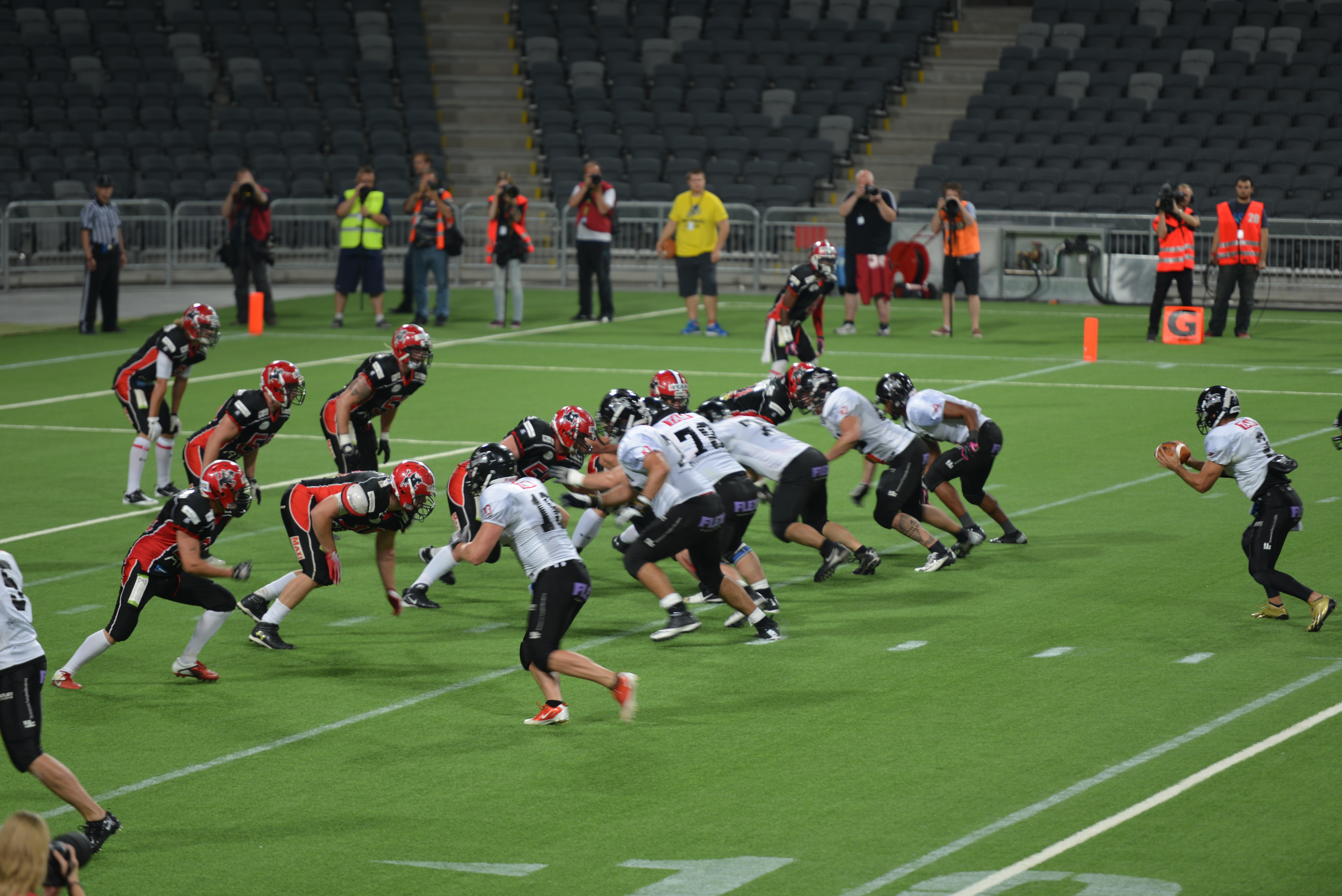
Carlstad Crusaders vs Örebro Black Knights in 2013.

Team	Finished (2025)	City	Home stadium	Capacity
AIK Stockholm	5	Stockholm		
Carlstad Crusaders	1	Karlstad	Sola Arena	4,000
Göteborg Giants	–	Gothenburg		
Kristianstad Predators	4	Kristianstad		
Limhamn Griffins	7	Limhamn		
Örebro Black Knights	3	Örebro	Behrn Arena	12,700
Stockholm Mean Machines	6	Stockholm	Zinkensdamms IP	11,500
Tyresö Royal Crowns	2	Tyresö	Tyresövallen	2,700

== Superserien seasons ==
Season	Final				Regular season	
Season	Champions	Score	Opponent	ref.	Winners	# of teams
1991	Uppsala 86ers				Uppsala 86ers	6
1992	Uppsala 86ers				Limhamn Griffins	7
1993	Limhamn Griffins				Uppsala 86ers	9
1994	Limhamn Griffins				Limhamn Griffins	10
1995	Solna Chiefs				Limhamn Griffins	9
1996	Kristianstad C4 Lions				Kristianstad C4 Lions	7
1997	Stockholm Mean Machines				Limhamn Griffins	8
1998	Stockholm Mean Machines				Stockholm Mean Machines	8
1999	Stockholm Mean Machines				Stockholm Mean Machines	8
2000	Stockholm Mean Machines				Stockholm Mean Machines	7
2001	Tyresö Royal Crowns				Stockholm Mean Machines	7
2002	Stockholm Mean Machines	28–20	Carlstad Crusaders		Arlanda Jets	8
2003	Arlanda Jets	14–7	Carlstad Crusaders		Carlstad Crusaders	5
2004	Stockholm Mean Machines	7–0	Carlstad Crusaders		Carlstad Crusaders	8
2005	Stockholm Mean Machines	35–21	Carlstad Crusaders		Stockholm Mean Machines	5
2006	Stockholm Mean Machines	24–21	Carlstad Crusaders		Stockholm Mean Machines	5
2007	Limhamn Griffins	9–6	Carlstad Crusaders		Carlstad Crusaders	5
2008	Stockholm Mean Machines	70–39	Arlanda Jets		Stockholm Mean Machines	7
2009	Stockholm Mean Machines	24–20	Carlstad Crusaders		Carlstad Crusaders	6
2010	Carlstad Crusaders	37–15	Tyresö Royal Crowns		Carlstad Crusaders	6
2011	Carlstad Crusaders	20–7	Tyresö Royal Crowns		Carlstad Crusaders	6
2012	Carlstad Crusaders	24–0	Tyresö Royal Crowns		Tyresö Royal Crowns	7
2013	Carlstad Crusaders	47–25	Örebro Black Knights		Tyresö Royal Crowns	8
2014	Carlstad Crusaders	49–9	Örebro Black Knights		Carlstad Crusaders	9
2015	Carlstad Crusaders	42–17	Örebro Black Knights		Tyresö Royal Crowns	9
2016	Carlstad Crusaders	34–22	Uppsala 86ers		Carlstad Crusaders	7
2017	Carlstad Crusaders	24–0	Örebro Black Knights		Carlstad Crusaders	6
2018	Stockholm Mean Machines	42–41	Carlstad Crusaders		Carlstad Crusaders	5
2019	Stockholm Mean Machines	49–35	Carlstad Crusaders		Stockholm Mean Machines	5
2020	Carlstad Crusaders	14–12	Stockholm Mean Machines		Stockholm Mean Machines	4
2021	Örebro Black Knights	28–14	Stockholm Mean Machines		Örebro Black Knights	4
2022	Stockholm Mean Machines	52–8	Örebro Black Knights		Stockholm Mean Machines	4
2023	Stockholm Mean Machines	55–35	Tyresö Royal Crowns		Stockholm Mean Machines	4
2024	Carlstad Crusaders	51–22	Stockholm Mean Machines		Carlstad Crusaders	8
2025	Carlstad Crusaders	36–6	Tyresö Royal Crowns		Carlstad Crusaders	9
2026	Tyresö Royal Crowns	49–33	Stockholm Mean Machines		Carlstad Crusaders	8
