= Gamla Tyresö =

Coordinates: 59°14′N 18°17′E

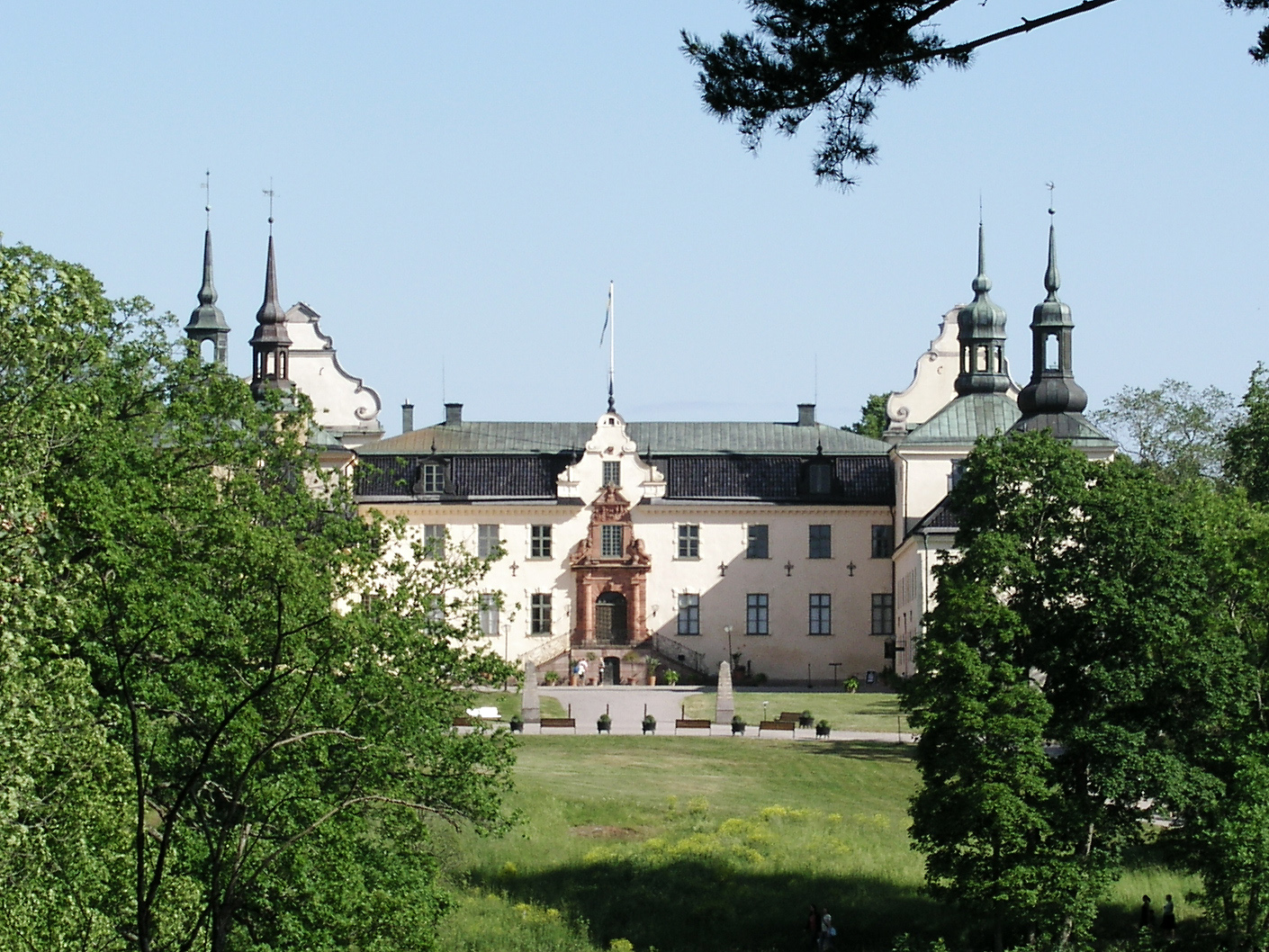
Tyreso Palace

Gamla Tyresö (meaning Old Tyresö) is a district of Tyresö Municipality in Sweden. It consists of the eastern half of the municipality, containing the Tyresö Strand and Raksta areas, the long Brevik peninsula, and the vast forest in the south.

Gamla Tyresö contains almost exclusively detached houses and summer cottages. The Tyresö Strand area has since mid-1990s been built with a higher density with tightly packed detached, semi-detached and terraced houses. There is a small amount of apartment buildings and commercial establishments around Strandtorget.

Tyresö Palace and Tyresö Church from 17th century are located in Gamla Tyresö as well. The forest in south contains about half of Tyresta National Park on the Tyresö side.

Located on the Brevik peninsula, southeast of Trinntorp, is Telegrafberget 84 m (276 ft) above sea level, from where one has a view all the way to central Stockholm.

== Residential and urban areas ==
The population of the residential areas typically associated with Gamla Tyresö, as of January 1, 2004:

- Tyresö Strand: 2,874
- East Tyresö: 2,721
- Total: 5,595 — or 14.0% of the population of Tyresö Municipality.

Gamla Tyresö is part of three urban areas:

- Stockholm
- Raksta
- Brevik peninsula (Brevikshalvön)
