= Tyresö (disambiguation) =

Tyresö may refer to:

== Places ==
- Tyresö Municipality, municipality in Stockholm County, Sweden
- Tyresö Palace, palace in Tyresö Municipality, Stockholm County, Sweden
- Tyresö Centrum, an enclosed shopping centre in Bollmora, Tyresö Municipality, Stockholm County, Sweden

== Other uses ==
- Tyresö FF, Swedish football club from Tyresö Municipality, Stockholm County, Sweden
- Tyresö HF, Swedish women's handball club from Tyresö Municipality, Stockholm County, Sweden
