= Grändalssjön =

Lake in Tyresö Municipality, Sweden

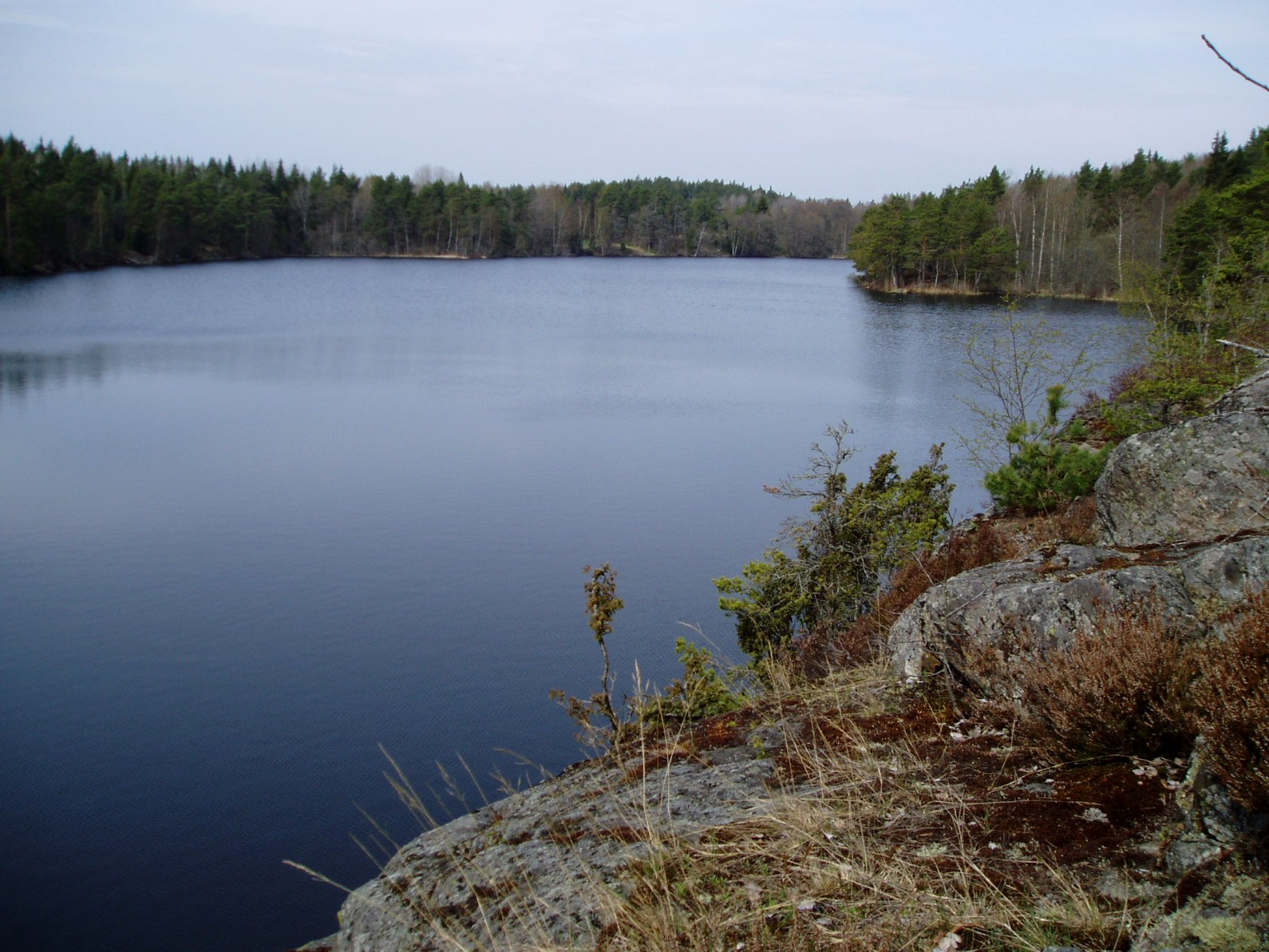

- Location within Sweden
- Coordinates: 59°12′46″N 18°17′38″E
- Primary outflows: Albysjön
- Basin countries: Sweden
- Surface area: 0.080 km^{2} (0.031 sq mi)
- Average depth: 3.7 m (12 ft)
- Max. depth: 5.1 m (17 ft)
- Water volume: 0.380 km^{3} (308,000 acre⋅ft)
- Surface elevation: 19.6 m (64 ft)
- Settlements: Tyresö

Grändalssjön (Swedish for "Lake of Grändalen") is a small lake in Tyresö Municipality south-east of central Stockholm, Sweden.

Grändalssjön, one of the lakes within the Tyresån Lake System, empties in its eastern end into a southbound bay of lake Albysjön located north of it. Immediately north of Grändalssjön is the Raksta open-air area, and Övre kärret ("Upper Swamp"), a swampy lake, is located west of the lake. Two small cottages located nearby, Grändalen and Skansen, are part of Gamla Tyresö.

The lake is popular for bathing and fishing. Motorboats are not allowed on the lake. It is virtually unaffected by eutrophication and human activities. It consequently has moderate levels of nutrients.

The stock of crayfishes is undocumented, but fishing using a maximum of ten tools is allowed with a fishing license. Aquatic vegetation is dominated by Fragile Stonewort.

== See also ==
- Geography of Stockholm
