= Fatburen =

Small lake in Sweden

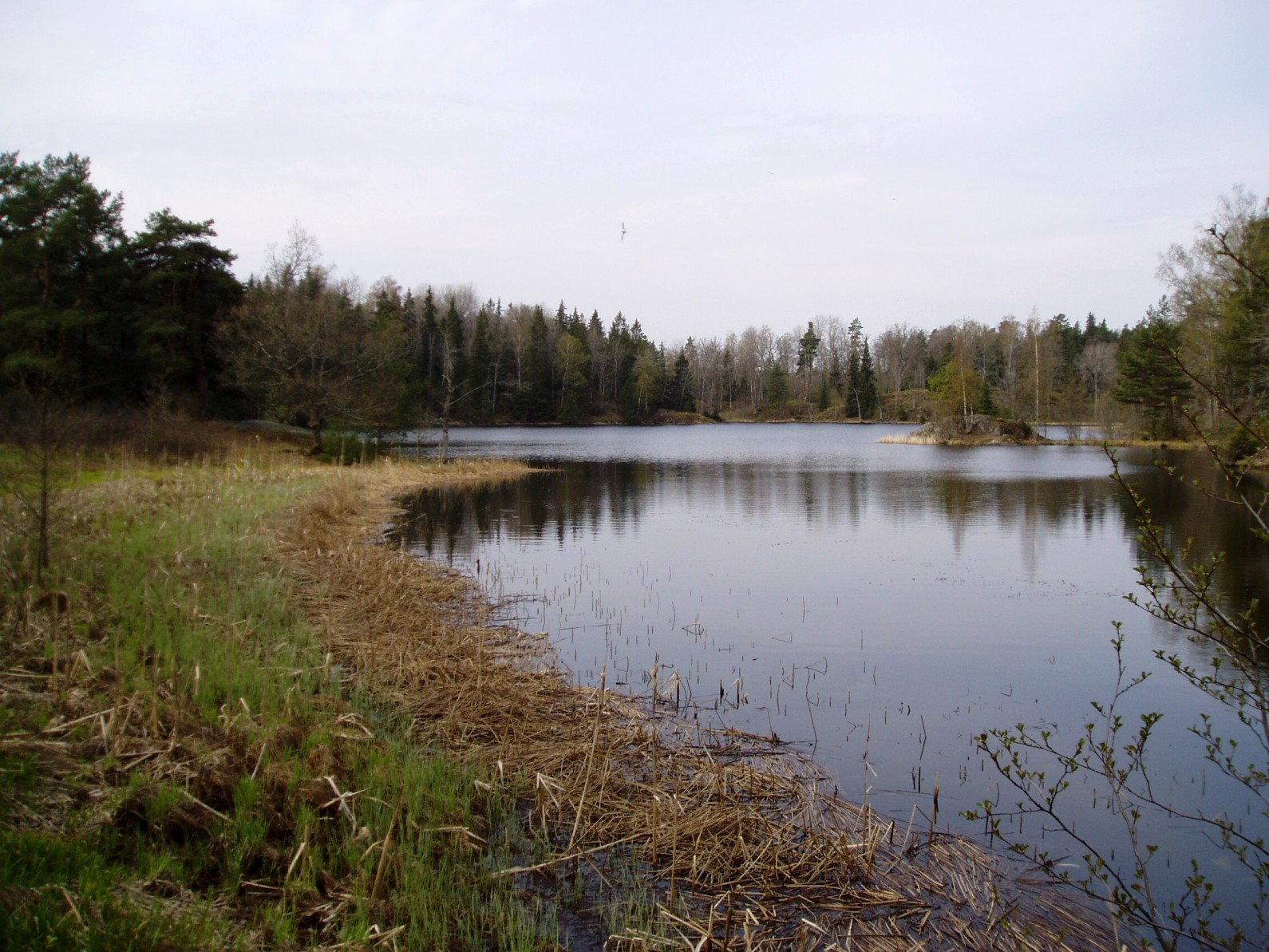

- Location within Stockholm Location within Sweden
- Location: Stockholm
- Coordinates: 59°13′58″N 18°17′30″E
- Primary inflows: Albysjön
- Primary outflows: Kalvfjärden
- Basin countries: Sweden
- Surface area: 0.030 km^{2} (0.012 sq mi)
- Average depth: 1.9 m (6 ft 3 in)
- Max. depth: 5.0 m (16.4 ft)
- Water volume: 0.898 km^{3} (728,000 acre⋅ft)
- Surface elevation: 13.7 m (45 ft)
- Settlements: Tyresö

Fatburen is a small lake in Tyresö Municipality, south-east of central Stockholm, Sweden. It is the last and easternmost lake within the Tyresån Lake System.

The lake is roughly triangular in shape with its inflow from Albysjön in the southern corner, and its outflow to Kalvfjärden in the north-eastern corner. It is separated from Albysjön by the peninsula Rävnäset, a municipal nature reserve covering 27 ha. It contains a wide range of rare species and is together with the nature and park surrounding Tyresö Palace one of the best locales for bats. South-east of the lake is the residential area Solberga.

In summers, the lake is part of a popular walk for visitors attracted by the Tyresö Palace and its surroundings. In winters, the lake is popular for ice fishing.

There are 21 species of vascular plants by the lake which in itself contains 9-13 aquatic plants, a relatively high biodiversity within the lake system. Common fishes include Perch, Pike, and Zander.

Notwithstanding its eutrophication, the presence of Stoneworts in Fatburen indicates the waters have a relatively high visibility, which, considering it is the last lake in the lake system, is surprising.
