= Albysjön (Tyresö) =

Lake in Tyresö municipality, Sweden

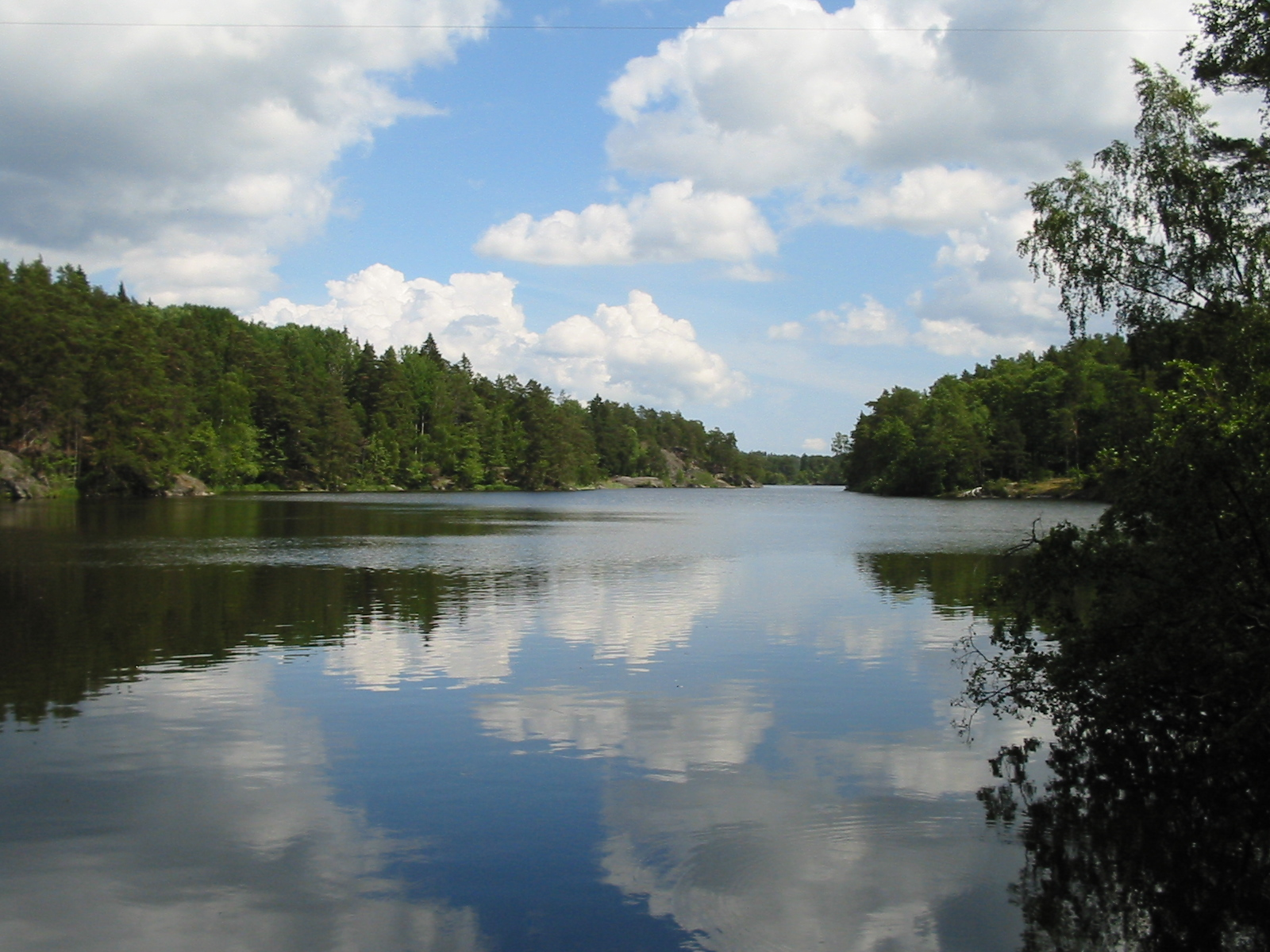
- View northeast along Nyforsviken with Albysjön in the background.

- Location within Stockholm
- Coordinates: 59°13′41.1″N 18°17′4.2″E
- Primary inflows: Tyresö-Flaten, Grändalssjön
- Primary outflows: Kalvfjärden, Fatburen
- Basin countries: Sweden
- Max. depth: 17 m (56 ft)
- Water volume: 0.790 km^{3} (640,000 acre⋅ft)
- Surface elevation: 13.7 m (45 ft)
- Settlements: Tyresö

Albysjön (Swedish for "Lake of Alby") is a lake in Tyresö Municipality just south of Stockholm in Sweden.

Albysjön is the last lake in the Tyresån Lake System. Surrounded by green spaces and pastures, it is popular for bathing, angling, canoeing, and other open-air activities. Motor engines are prohibited.

== Environmental status ==
Levels of phosphorus and nitrogen are very high. High amounts of phosphorus compounds causes dense reed growth in the shallow bays of the lake. The reed was mechanically removed in 1975, but no follow-up action has taken place since. Lack of oxygen and hydrogen sulfide formation in sediments is a problem in summers. A brook causes high levels of lead and copper in Uddsbyviken, one of the northern bays. Samples taken in 1989 showed pollution is 10-20 times higher in the brook than normal levels for such water courses, which is however not unusual in and around Stockholm. Tests with biological filters will hopefully prove successful in lowering these levels. Algal bloom is relatively common in summers, but bathing is rarely prohibited.

== Fauna ==
Common fishes include zander, northern pike, and perch.

There are 16 species of vascular plant by the lake.

== See also ==
- Geography of Stockholm
- Albysjön, Botkyrka
