= Barnsjön =

Lake in Tyresö Municipality, Sweden

- Location within Stockholm
- Coordinates: 59°13′35.6″N 18°14′7.7″E
- Primary outflows: Tyresö-Flaten
- Basin countries: Sweden
- Surface area: 2.0 ha (4.9 acres)
- Surface elevation: 30 m (98 ft)
- Settlements: Tyresö

Barnsjön (Swedish for "the Child Lake") is a small lake within the Tyresån Lake System in Tyresö Municipality south of Stockholm, Sweden.

The lake, situated between the residential areas Trollbäcken and Bollmora, empties into Lake Tyresö-Flaten through the brook Prästängsdiket. It is regarded as an important local recreational milieu. It is popular for both fishing and bathing. There are two municipal baths by the lake.

== Environmental impact ==
Barnsjön is a forest lake poor in nutrients. With a low buffering capacity, the lake is sensitive to acid deposits and has an acidity at about pH 7. It is therefore regarded as important to avoid contaminations within its catchment area.

== See also ==
- Geography of Stockholm
