= Tyresö-Flaten =

Lake south of Stockholm, Sweden

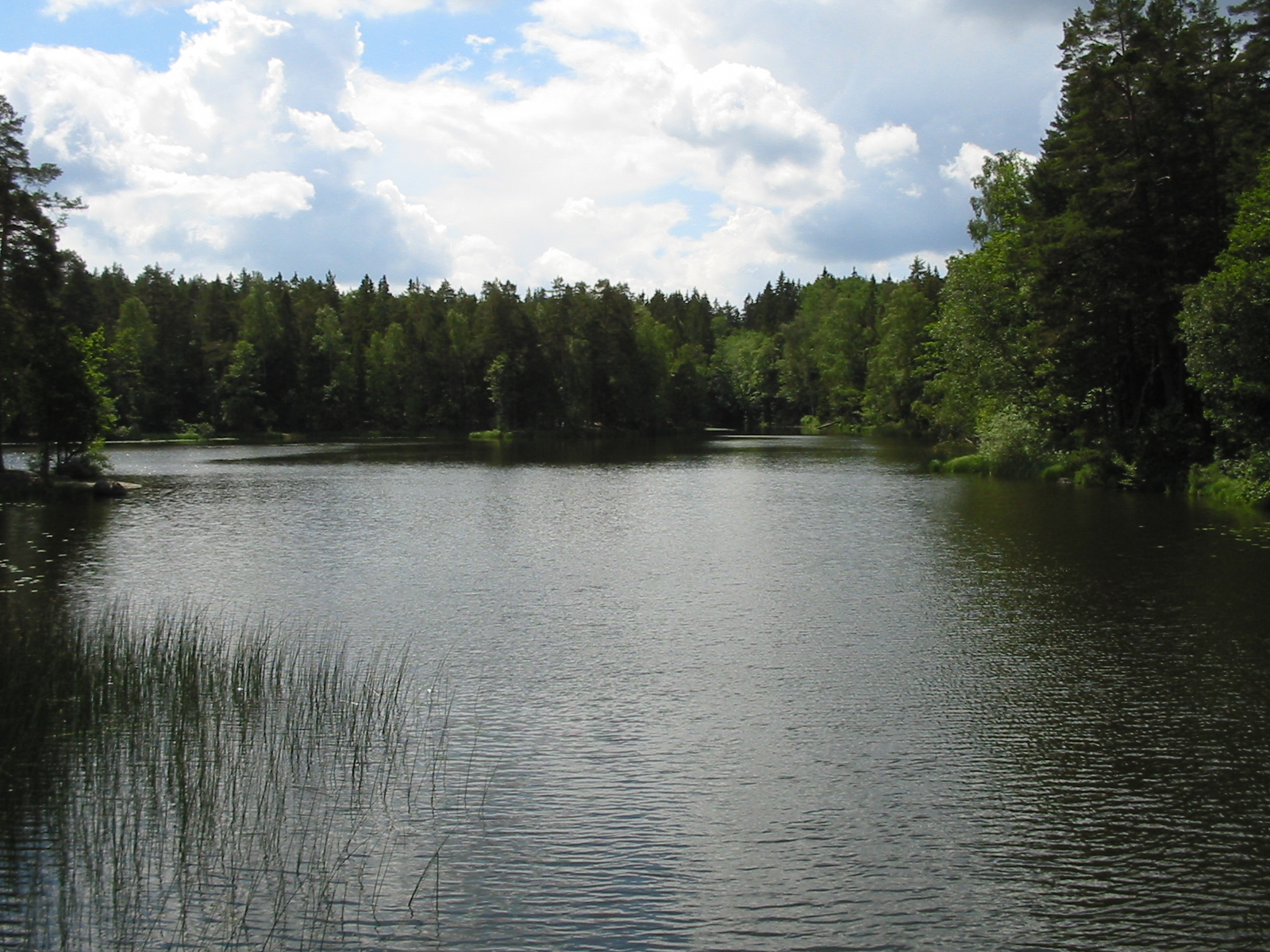
- Western end of the lake

- Location within Stockholm
- Coordinates: 59°13′17.9″N 18°15′41.2″E
- Primary inflows: Långsjön, Barnsjön
- Primary outflows: Albysjön
- Basin countries: Sweden
- Surface area: 36.0 ha (89 acres)
- Max. depth: 26 m (85 ft)
- Surface elevation: 19 m (62 ft)
- Settlements: Tyresö

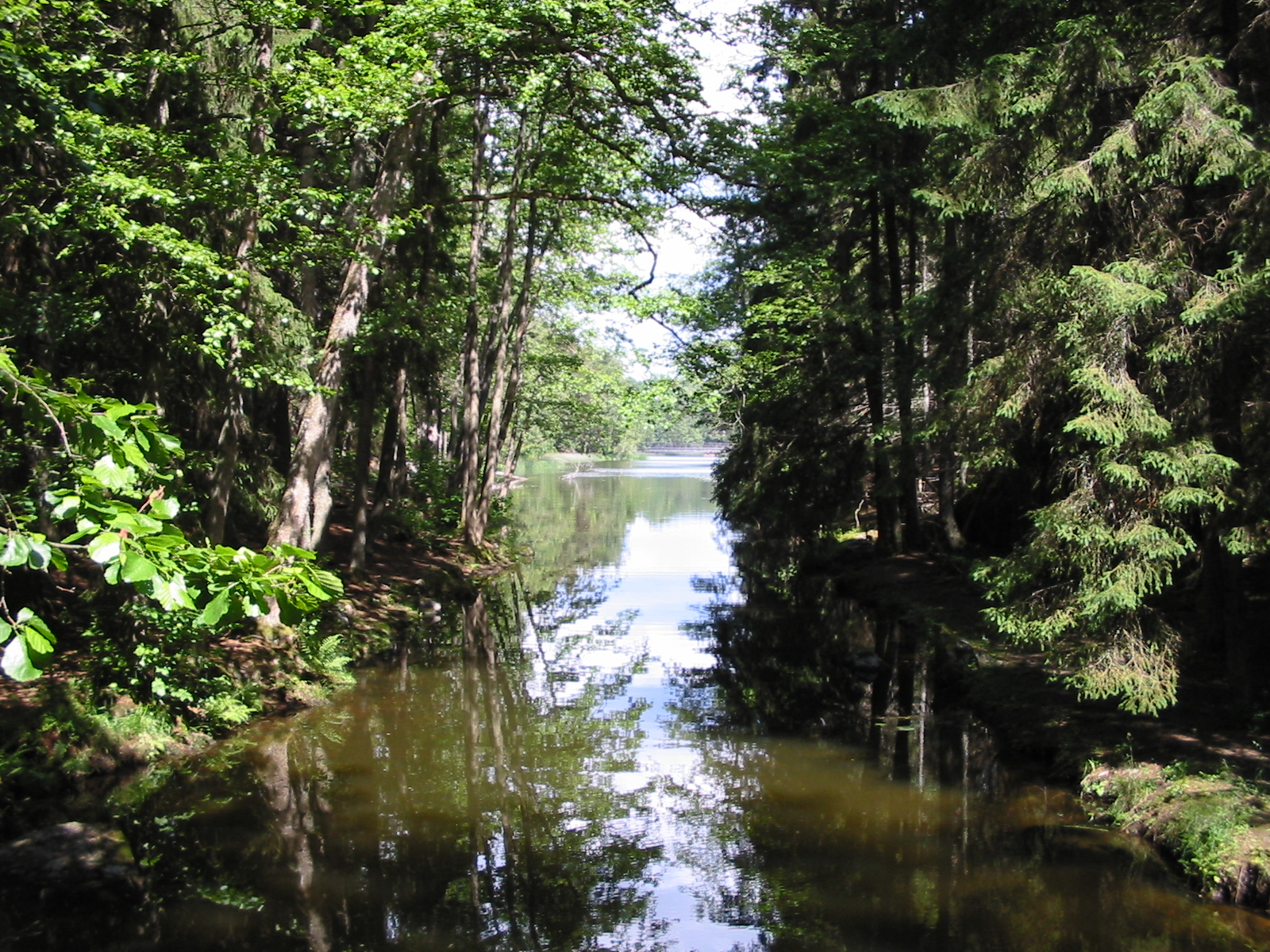
Gammelströmmen. the inflow of lake Tyresö-Flaten.

Tyresö-Flaten is a lake in Tyresö Municipality, south of Stockholm, Sweden.

The lake forms part of the Tyresån lake system and as such is considered important for recreational activities such as angling and bathing. Common fish species include perch, zander pike, lake trout, carp bream, and roach.

== Environmental impact ==
When the water stagnates in late summer hydrogen sulfide and oxygen shortage occurs in the lake sediments. However, levels of bacteria are low and the lake is considered safe for bathing. No contamination except nutritive salt has been reported.

== See also ==
- Geography of Stockholm
