= Trollbäcken =

Outer suburb of Stockholm, Sweden

Coordinates: 59°13′17″N 18°12′9″E

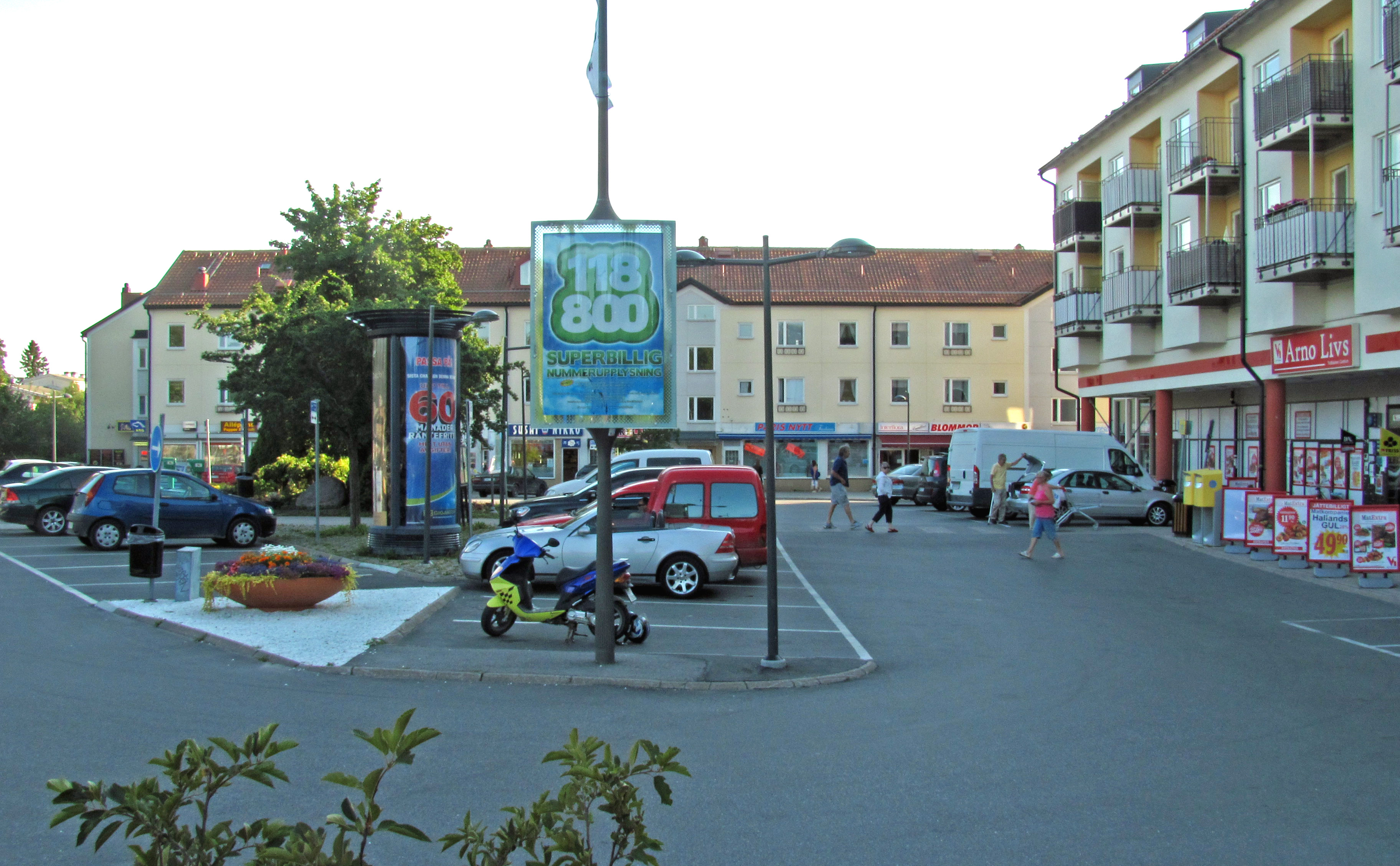
Trollbäcken

Trollbäcken is a district of Tyresö Municipality in Sweden. It is located south of Bollmora along county road 260. Trollbäcken contains almost exclusively detached houses. In the area of Trollbäcken centre (Trollbäckens centrum), also known as Alléplan, there are some multi-apartment buildings and commercial structures. There are also a couple of restaurants near "Trollbäcken centrum" such as "lila rött" and "sushi niko"

In 1910 the land of Kumla manor was sold and divided into lots. During the 1920s to 1930s there was a lot of summer cottage development in that area. From the 1950s and onwards the cottages began to be converted into permanent dwellings in a large scale. Trollbäcken housed the municipal executive board of Tyresö from the 1940s until the Bollmora centre was built.

Trollbäcken has as of January 1, 2004 11,715 inhabitants, which is 29.2% of the population of Tyresö Municipality.

Lake Barnsjön is a popular spot for bathing and fishing.
