= Långsjön (Skälsätra-Tutviken) =

Lake in Tyresö Municipality, Sweden

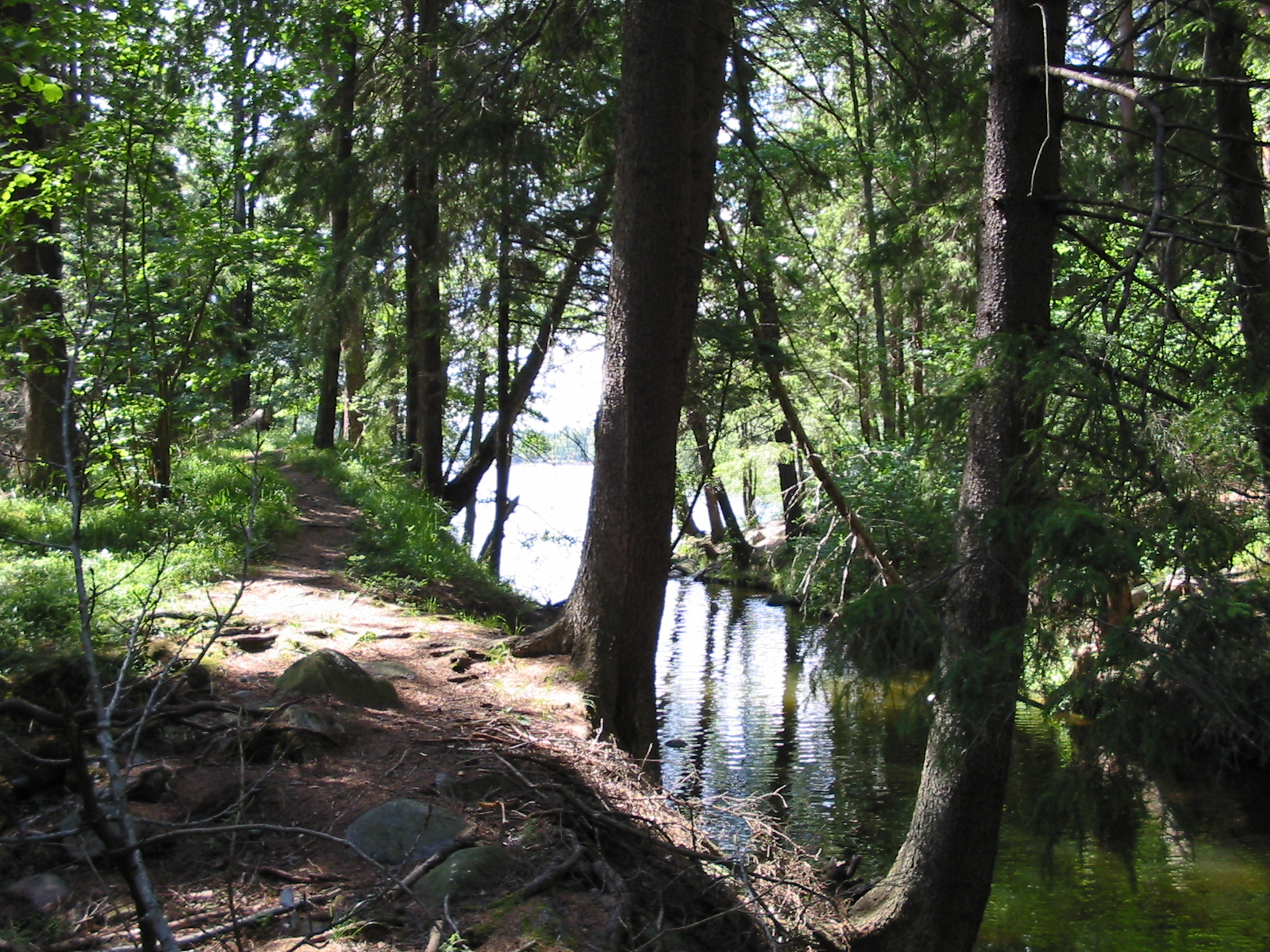
- Gammelströmmen, the outlet of Långsjön

- Location within Stockholm
- Coordinates: 59°12′56″N 18°14′01″E
- Primary inflows: Drevviken
- Primary outflows: Tyresö-Flaten
- Basin countries: Sweden
- Surface area: 33.8 ha (84 acres)
- Max. depth: 6–7 m (20–23 ft)
- Surface elevation: 19.0 m (62.3 ft)
- Settlements: Haninge, Tyresö

Långsjön (Swedish for "Long Lake") is a lake in the Tyresån Lake System located on the border between Haninge and Tyresö Municipalities in Stockholm County, Sweden.

Flowing west to east, the lake receives water from Lake Drevviken and empties into Tyresö-Flaten, and separates two residential areas — Skälsätra north of it and Tutviken south of it.

It is a shallow lake with step shores surrounded by flat rock terrain. Its water used to be unsuitable for bathing due to high bacteria levels, but the situation has improved lately and bacteria levels in the lake are now in pair with the rest of the lake system, most likely due to decreased surface runoff caused by warmer winters. Levels of phosphorus and nitrogen are very high. The buffering capacity is very good.

Few species are contained in the lake, the aquatic vegetation of which is limited to some reeds.
