= Demetrin Veal =

Brazilian gridiron football player (born 1981)

No. 99, 97
- Position: Defensive tackle

Personal information
- Born: August 11, 1981 (age 45)
- Listed height: 6 ft 2 in (1.88 m)
- Listed weight: 288 lb (131 kg)

Career information
- High school: Paramount (Paramount, California)
- College: Tennessee
- NFL draft: 2003: 7th round, 238th overall pick

Career history
- Atlanta Falcons (2003); Baltimore Ravens (2004)*; Denver Broncos (2004–2006); Tennessee Titans (2007); Florida Tuskers (2009)*; Omaha Nighthawks (2010)
- * Offseason or practice squad member only

Career NFL statistics
- Total tackles: 66
- Sacks: 2.5
- Forced fumbles: 1
- Fumble recoveries: 1
- Stats at Pro Football Reference

Demetrin Leandro Veal (born August 11, 1981) is an American former professional football player who was a defensive tackle for four seasons in the National Football League (NFL). He was selected by the Atlanta Falcons in the seventh round of the 2003 NFL draft. He played college football for the Tennessee Volunteers.

In addition, Veal was a member of the Baltimore Ravens, Denver Broncos, Tennessee Titans, Florida Tuskers and Omaha Nighthawks.

== Early life and college ==
Sources conflict on whether Veal was born in Brazil or California. He attended Paramount High School in Paramount, California. He played college football at Cerritos College from 1999 to 2000 and at Tennessee from 2001 to 2002.

== Professional career ==
Veal was selected by the Atlanta Falcons in the seventh round, with the 238th overall pick, of the 2003 NFL draft. He officially signed with the team on June 18, 2003. He played in three games for the Falcons in 2003, recording one solo tackle and two assisted tackles. Veal was waived by the Falcons on September 5, 2004.

He was signed to the practice squad of the Baltimore Ravens on September 21, 2004.

The Denver Broncos signed Veal off of the Raven's practice squad on December 18, 2004. He played in 15 games for the Broncos during the 2005 season, totaling 19 solo tackles, six assisted tackles, one sack, one fumble recovery and one safety. He re-signed with The Broncos on April 3, 2006. He appeared in 16 games, starting one, in 2006, recording 20 solo tackles, 12 assisted tackles, 1.5 sacks, one forced fumble and two pass breakups. Veal was released by the Broncos on August 28, 2007.

Veal signed with the Tennessee Titans on November 6, 2007. He played in three games for the Falcons, accumulating three solo tackles and three assisted tackles, before being waived on November 27, 2007.

He spent time on the practice squad of the Florida Tuskers of the United Football League (UFL) in 2009.

Veal played in seven games for the Omaha Nighthawks of the UFL in 2010, recording five solo tackles, four assisted tackles and 1.5 sacks.

== Coaching career ==
Veal has spent time coaching the Tyresö Royal Crowns, Team Sweden, and Team Netherlands.

== MMA career ==
Veal made his mixed martial arts debut on June 2, 2012, at Ring of Fire 43: Bad Blood, defeating former WWE wrestler Chad Wicks.
