= Telegrafberget =

Mountain in Tyresö, Sweden

Coordinates: 59°13′13″N 18°21′32″E

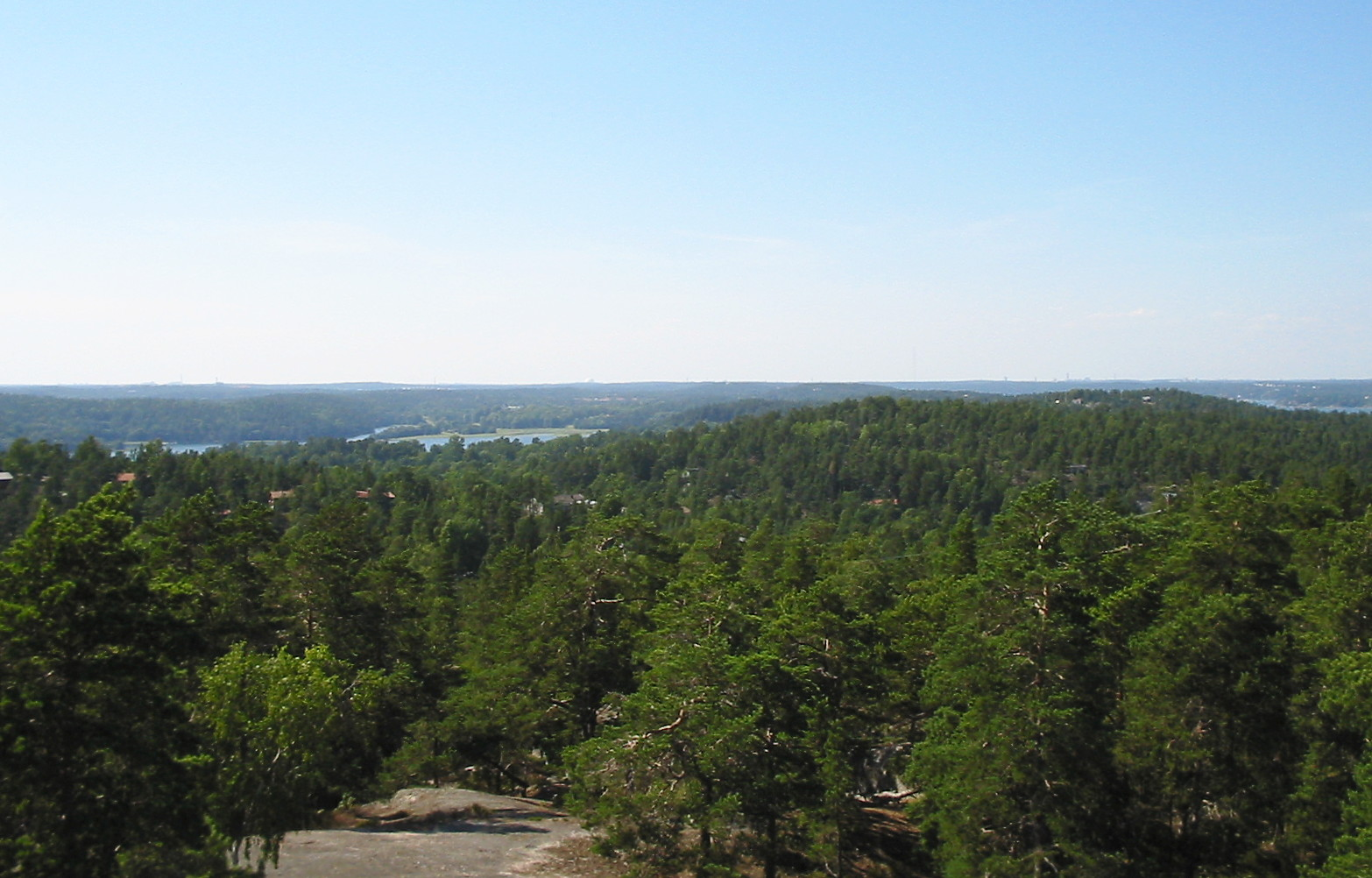
View from Telegrafberget towards Stockholm. The Avicii Arena (Globen) can be seen on the horizon.

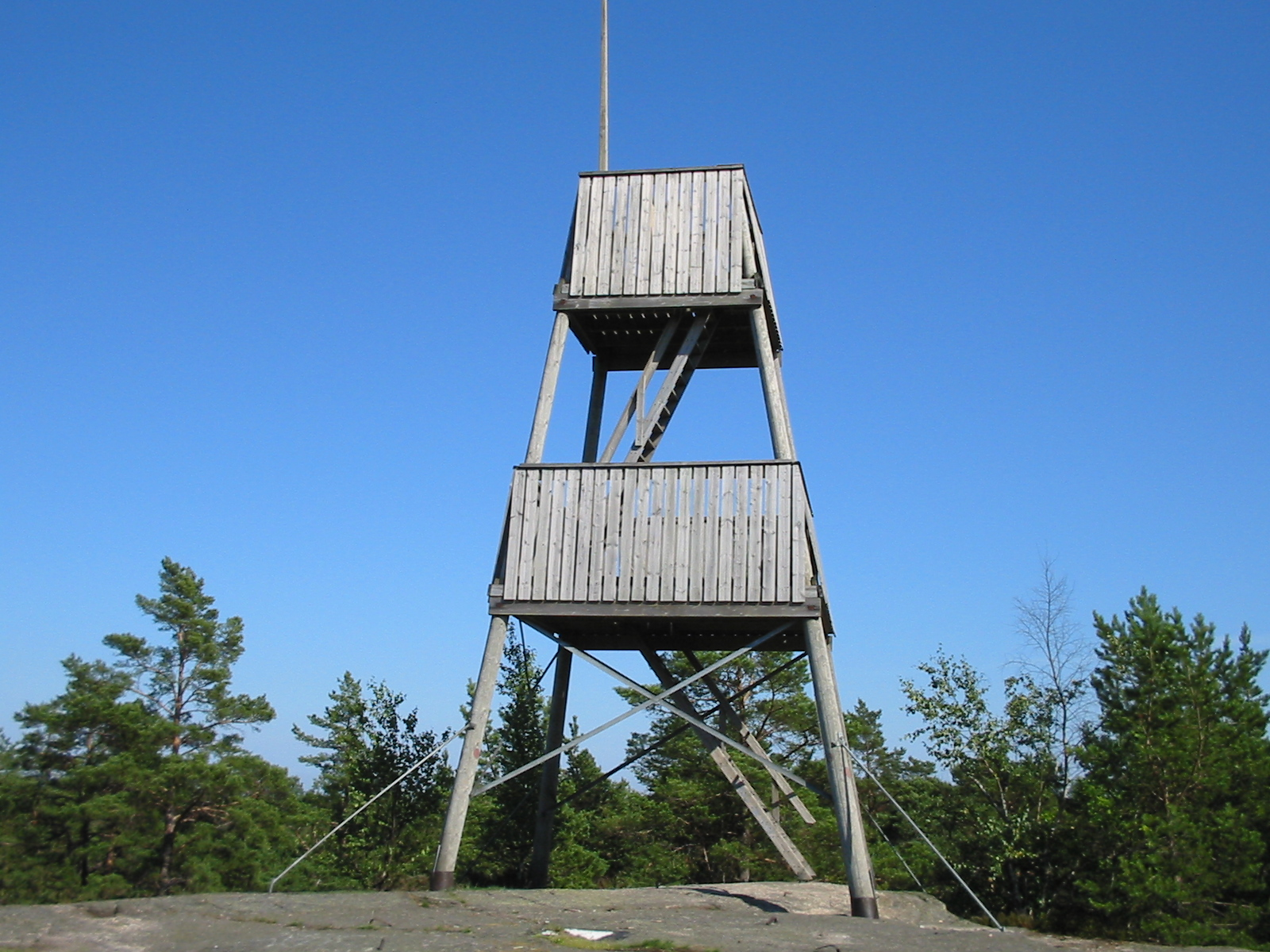
The watchtower on the top of Telegrafberget.

Telegrafberget has the highest point in Tyresö Municipality, Sweden, 84 m (276 ft) above sea level. On the top of it there is a watchtower with a view all the way to central Stockholm, Dalarö and Gustavsberg. Telegrafberget is located on the Brevik peninsula.

The hill is called Telegrafberget (Telegraph hill) because a station for optical telegraph was located there in the 19th century.
