= Tyresövallen =

Sports ground in Tyresö, Sweden

- Vallen
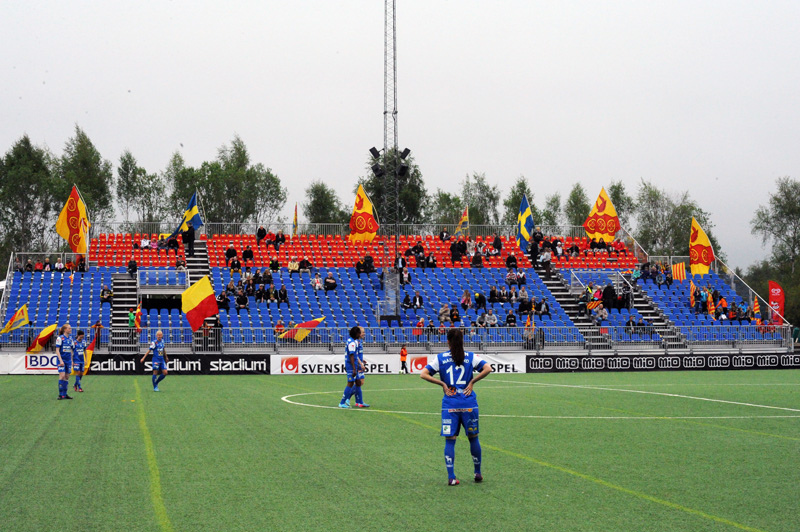
- Interactive map of Tyresövallen
- Former names: Bollmoravallen
- Location: Tyresö, Sweden
- Coordinates: 59.24770°N 18.22410°E
- Owner: Tyresö Municipality
- Capacity: least 2,700
- Field size: 105 x 65 m

Tenants
- Tyresö FF; Tyresö AFF Royal Crowns

Tyresövallen, previous known as Bollmoravallen, is a football stadium in Tyresö, Sweden. The main tenants of the stadium are the football team Tyresö FF and the American football team Tyresö AFF Royal Crowns. The stadium holds least 2,700 people.

== Stands ==
There are two stands with seating which hold about 1,100 seats and there is a standing terrace which holds 1,600; a total of least 2,700 people.
