= Bollmora =

Area of Tyresö Municipality, Sweden

Coordinates: 59°14′27″N 18°13′25″E

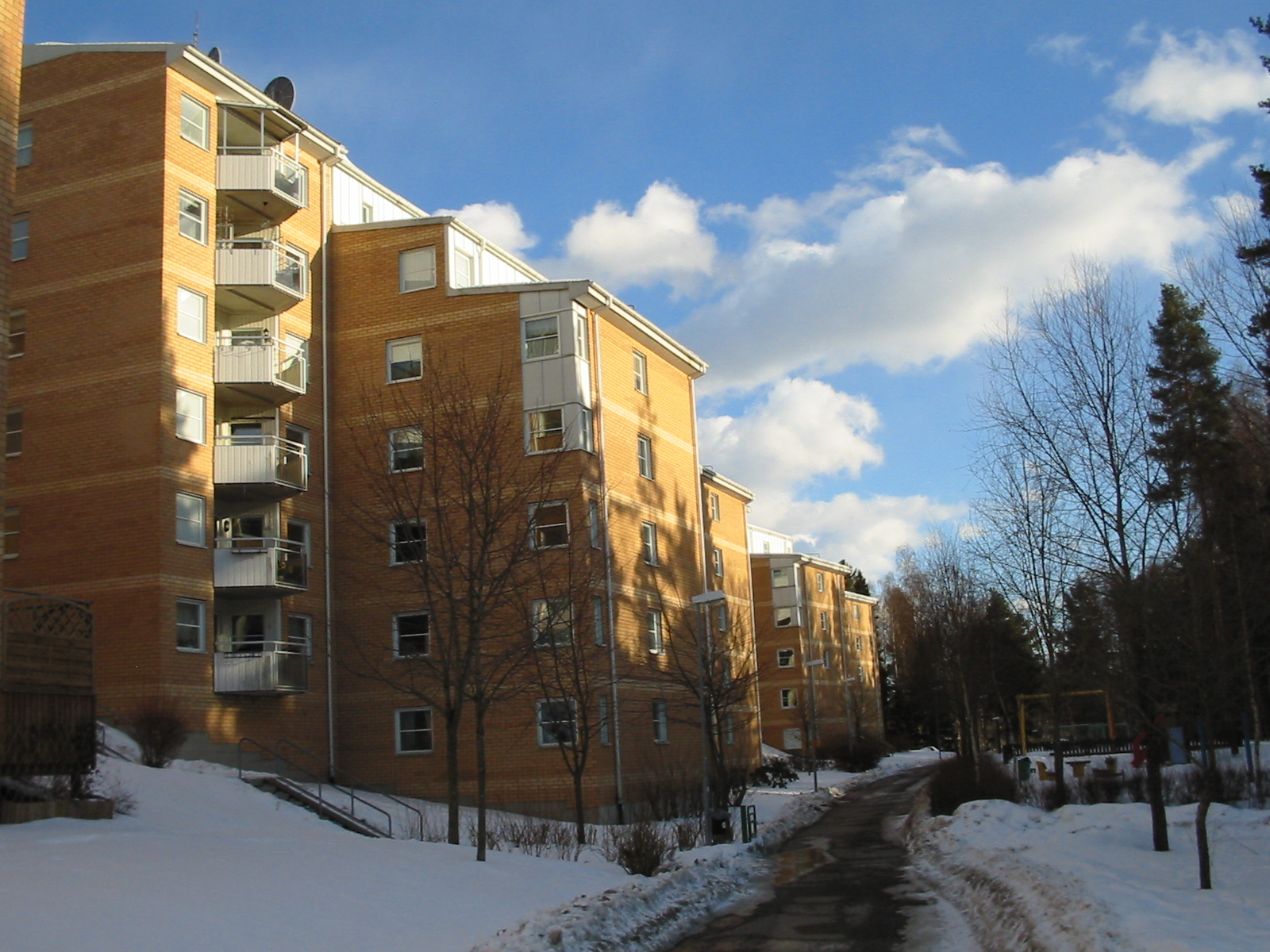
A residential block in Bollmora

Bollmora is the central district and municipal seat of Tyresö Municipality in Sweden. Together with major parts of the other two main districts of Tyresö, Trollbäcken and Gamla Tyresö, Bollmora forms a conurbation with Stockholm.

Bollmora derives its name from Bollmora farm (Bollmora gård) which was located near current day Njupkärrsvägen–Industrivägen intersection. Up until the 1950s Bollmora was a village, but in conjunction to the large migration to Stockholm in 1950s and 1960s, Bollmora expanded. The large expansion was made possible by Lex Bollmora from 1959, a legislation that made possible for municipal real estate companies to operate in other municipalities than their own. The municipal real estate companies of Stockholm started immediately constructing in Bollmora after the legislation came into effect. Many of the apartment building areas of Bollmora are from the Million Programme origin.

Bollmora centre (Bollmora centrum) was inaugurated in 1965, and it was fairly ordinary small-town centre with pedestrian streets. The centre underwent a major overhaul to an enclosed shopping mall in early 1990s. It was renamed Tyresö centre (Tyresö centrum) and the new centre was inaugurated in 1992.

Lake Barnsjön is a popular spot for bathing and fishing.

== Residential areas ==
The population of the residential areas typically associated with Bollmora, as of 1 January 2004

- Bollmora: 8,494
- Krusboda: 3,717
- East/West Farmarstigen: 2,668
- Öringe: 2,548
- Granängsringen: 2,187
- Fårdala: 1,657
- Lindalen: 1,445
- Total: 22,716 — or 56.7% of the population of Tyresö Municipality.
