= Maria Gustava Gyllenstierna =

Swedish countess, writer and translator

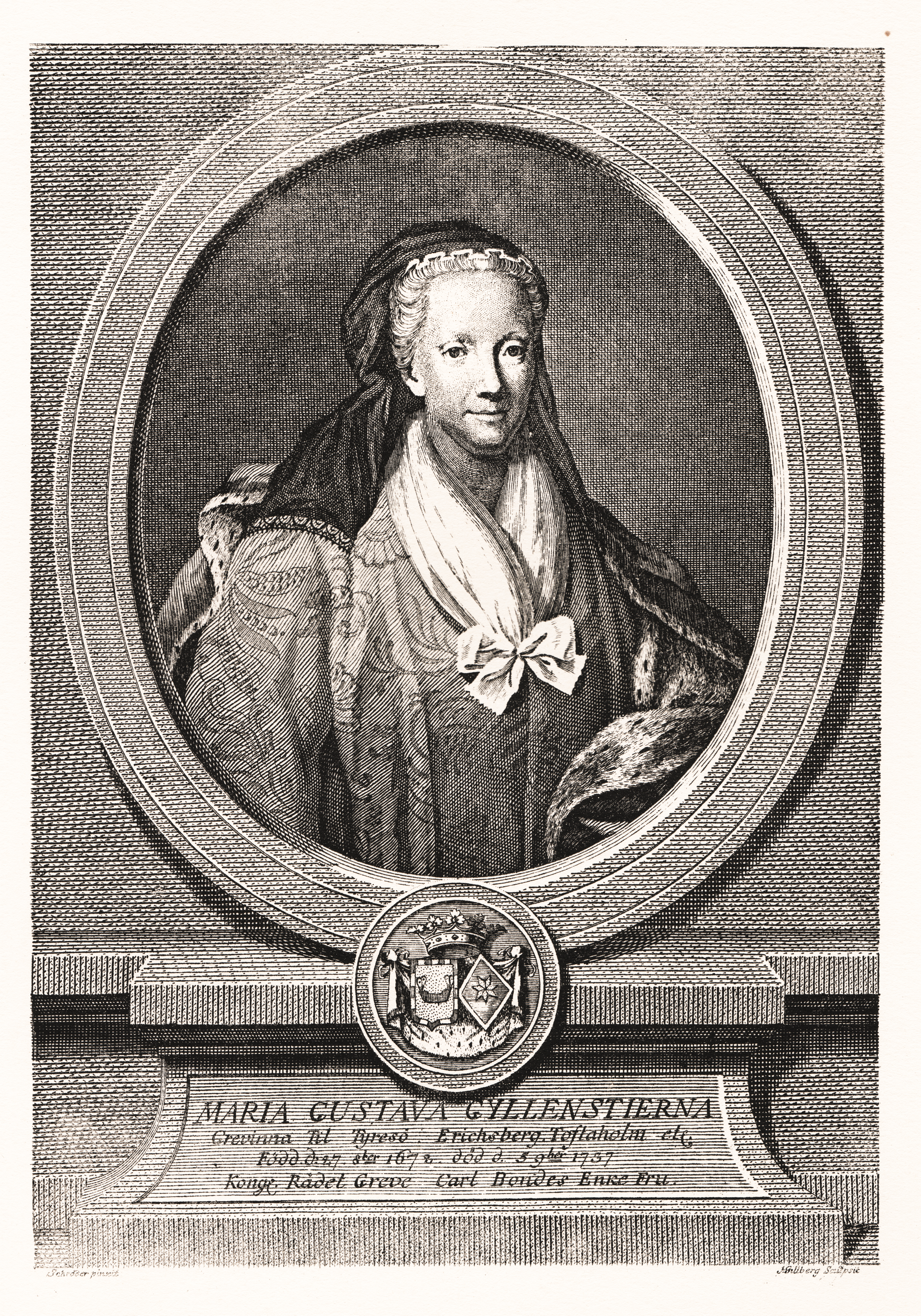
Maria Gustava Gyllenstierna. Engraving by Jacob Gillberg.

Maria Gustava Gyllenstierna (27 October 1672–5 November 1737) was a Swedish countess, writer and translator.

She was the daughter of count Christoffer Gyllenstierna and Gustava Juliana Oxenstierna and married in 1693 to count Karl Bonde of Björnö. After she became a widow in 1699, she lived on Tyresö Palace, which she had inherited from her grandmother Maria Sofia De la Gardie. She translated foreign works, wrote a work of the life of Jesus which was published in 1730–36, and wrote 600 sonnets. She gathered a circle of professors on Tyresö and corresponded with among others Sophia Elisabet Brenner. She was described as one of the most learned women of her epoch, and it was said that this made her unpopular among the male aristocracy, because she was generally to superior to them.

During the Russian Pillage of 1719-1721, when the Russians where sacking the territory, she made saved Tyresö Palace from being burnt. She tore down the towers of the palace, which, upon a distance, gave the Russians the impression that the palace had already been sacked: therefore, they turned back, and the palace was saved. Her documentation of the sacking is a valuable document over the contemporary historical infrastructure of the area.
