= Tyresö Centrum =

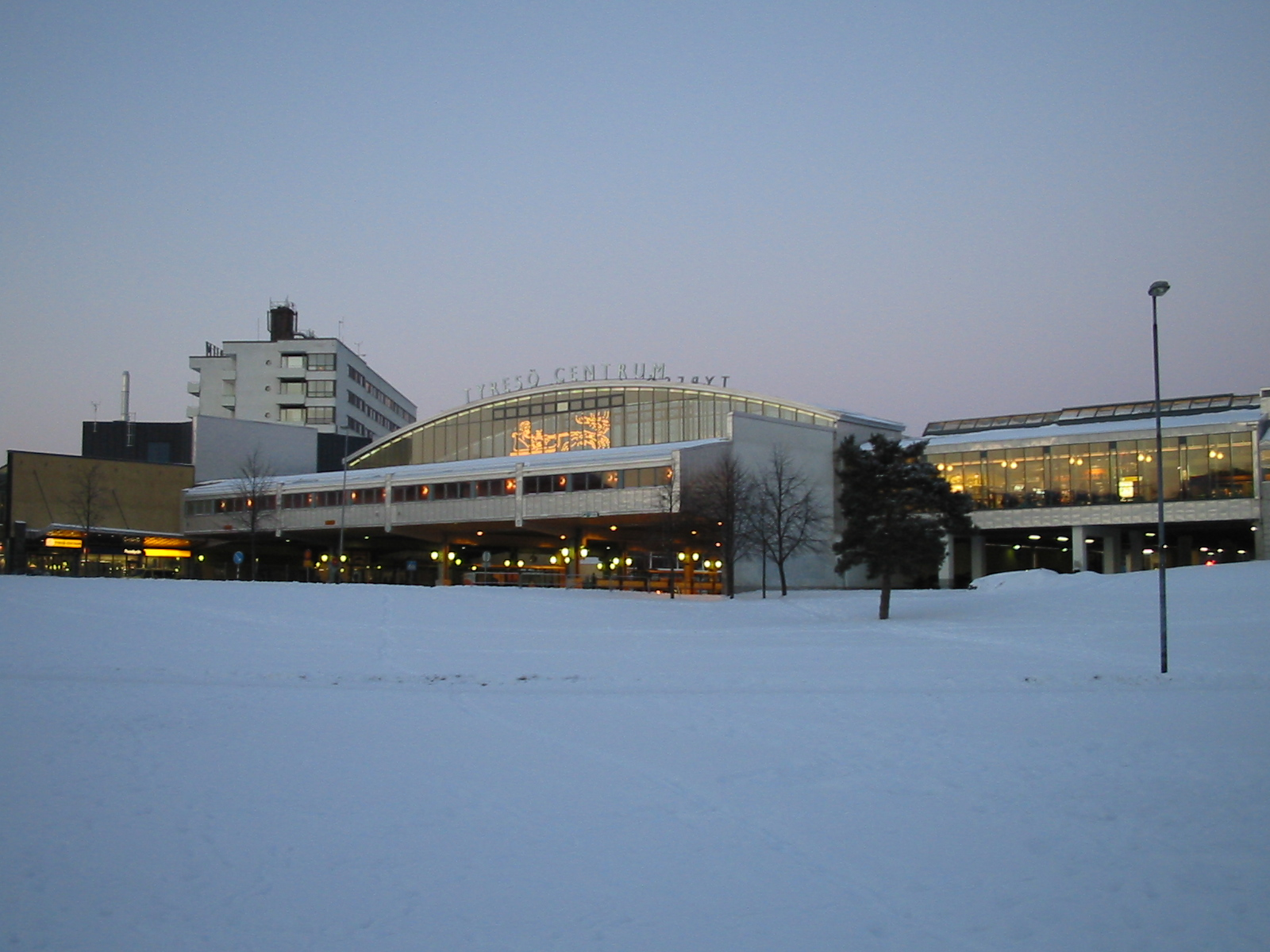
- The Tyresö Centrum enclosed shopping centre in Tyresö centre, Bollmora, during winter.
- Coordinates: 59°14′40″N 18°13′43″E
- Opened: 1965
- Owner: Skandia Fastighete
- Website: www.tyresocentrum.se

Tyresö Centrum (Tyresö Centre) is an enclosed shopping centre in Tyresö centre, Bollmora, the municipal centre of Tyresö, Sweden. It has 74 stores and other social or commercial units.

== History ==
Tyresö Centrum has its origins as Bollmora Centrum which was inaugurated in 1965 as a fairly ordinary small-town centre with pedestrian streets. The centre underwent a major overhaul to an enclosed shopping centre in early 1990s. It was renamed Tyresö Centrum and then was reinaugurated in 1992.

The centre was damaged by a fire shortly before its rebuilding was completed, delaying the full reopening a while.

Between 2003 and 2011, Tyresö Centrum was owned by Rodamco Europe who purchased it for 391 MSEK from the former owners Tyresö Bostäder AB and Apoteket AB's Pension Foundation. In 2011, it was sold to Dutch company Ing Reim for about 715 million SEK. The (as of 2018) current owners are Skandia Fastigheter, who purchased it in 2015.

Since December 2021, the mall offers a "parking" area for dogs developed by veterinarians and dog psychologists. In 2022, the city of Tyresö announced the construction of 10,000 homes around the mall.

== See also ==
- List of shopping centres in Sweden
