= Tyresö centre =

Municipal centre of Tyresö Municipality, Sweden

Coordinates: 59°14′40″N 18°13′43″E

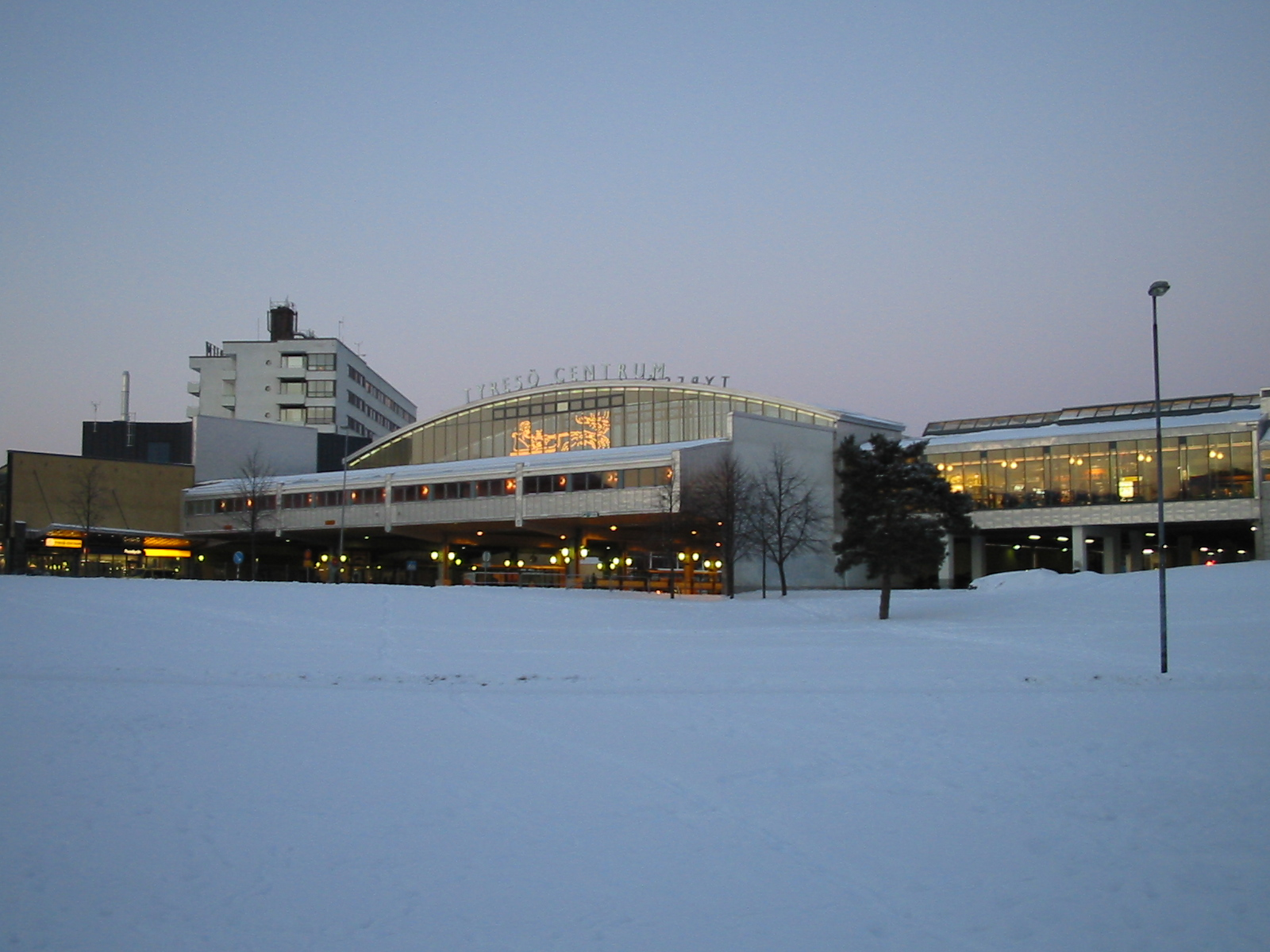
The Tyresö Centrum enclosed shopping mall in Tyresö centre, Bollmora, during winter.

Tyresö centre (Tyresö centrum) is the municipal centre of Tyresö Municipality, Sweden, located in the Bollmora district. The municipal hall (kommunhus) is located there inside Tyresö Centrum, an enclosed shopping mall.

A bus terminal is placed next to the shopping mall, providing bus lines to and from the various parts of Tyresö Municipality, and the neighbouring municipalities, including Stockholm, Haninge and Nacka.
