= Tyresö Church =

Church in Tyresö Municipality, Sweden

Coordinates: 59°14′12″N 18°18′05″E

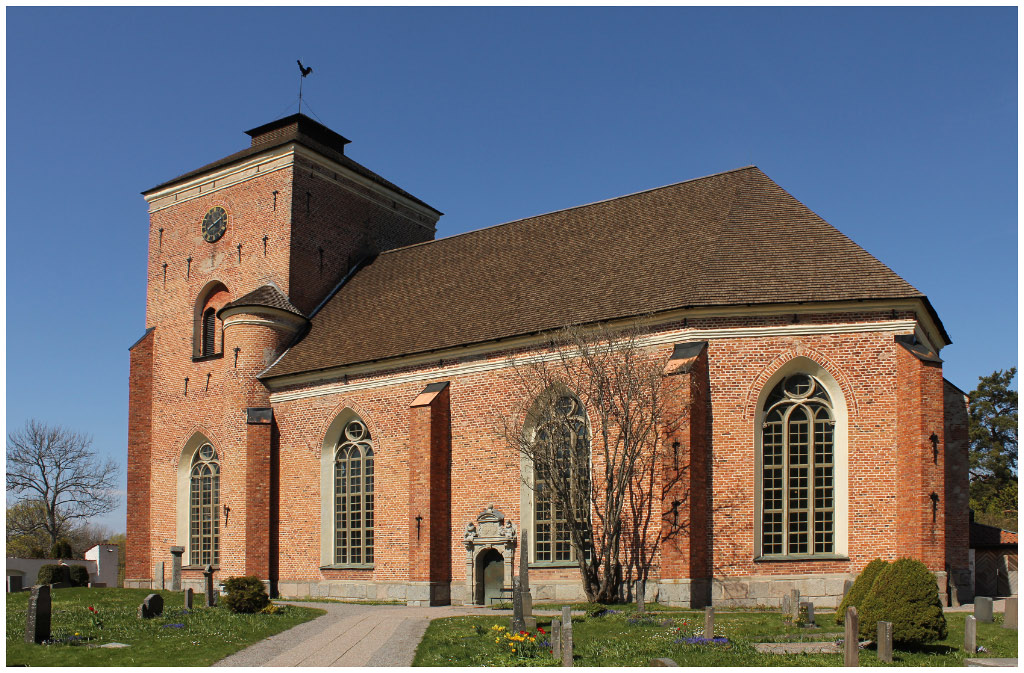
Tyresö church

Tyresö Church (Swedish: Tyresö kyrka) is a 17th-century church in Tyresö, Sweden, belonging to the Tyresö parish. The church is located near Tyresö Palace, which was built during the same era.

The church has a brick exterior and built in a style of a mixture of gothic and renaissance with the tower facing west. It was built during 1638–1640 by riksdrots Gabriel Oxenstierna, who also built Tyresö castle. The church was inaugurated March 9, 1641 with Gabriel Oxenstierna's own burial.

In 1790 the tower and roof were destroyed by a fire, and due to financial difficulties the spire on the tower was not rebuilt, and a low pyramid formed roof was built there instead, which is there still today.

Tyresö church is one of the most popular churches in Sweden for weddings due to its idyllic placement on a hillock surrounded by meadows and lush trees, and the proximity to Tyresö castle and no modern buildings nearby.

== Cemetery ==
The church's sanctity also made it the preferred place for performing a person's last rites. One of the earliest and most famous of such people was King Gustav II Adolf, whose last rites were held there. The cemetery is located behind the church. The Tyresö Castle forms the background to the cemetery.

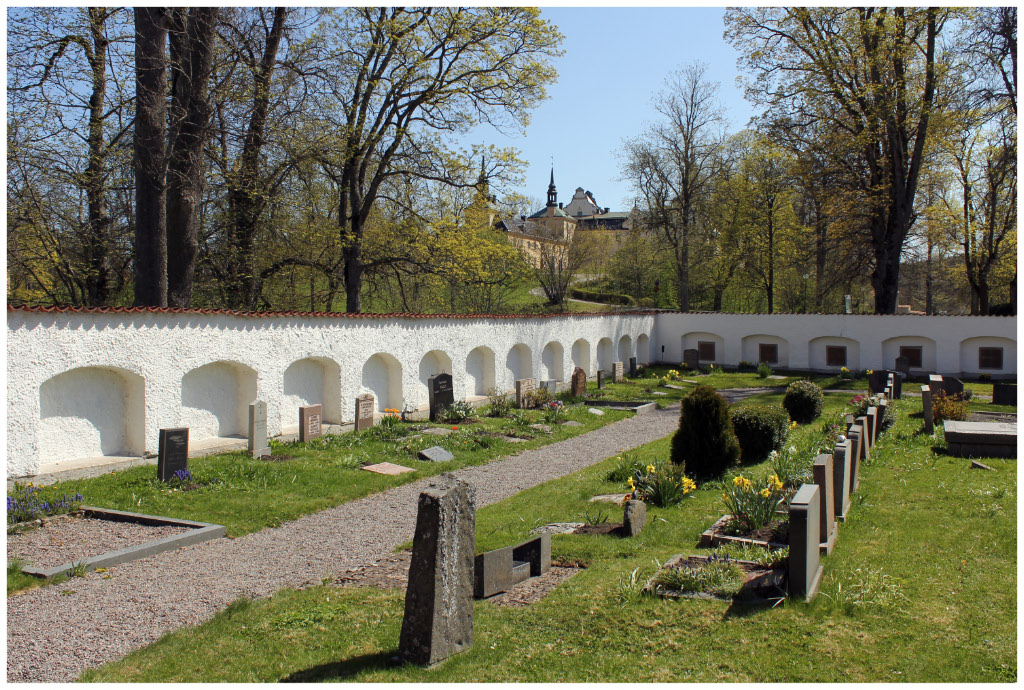
The cemetery in the Tyresö Church.

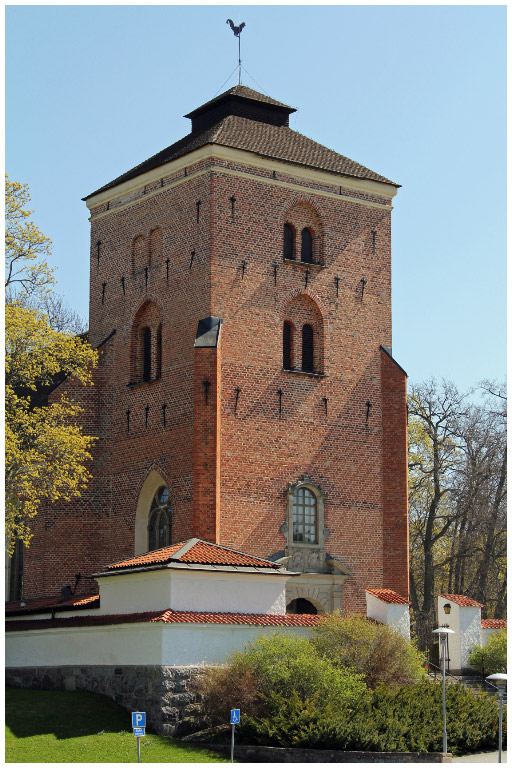
One of the towers of the church.
