= Raksta =

- Location within Stockholm Location within Sweden
- Coordinates: 59°13′N 18°18′E
- Country: Sweden
- Province: Södermanland
- County: Stockholm County
- Municipality: Tyresö Municipality

Area
  - Total: 1.79 km^{2} (0.69 sq mi)

Population (31 December 2010)
  - Total: 746
  - Density: 416/km^{2} (1,080/sq mi)
- Time zone: UTC+1 (CET)
  - Summer (DST): UTC+2 (CEST)

Raksta is a locality situated in Tyresö Municipality, Stockholm County, Sweden with 746 inhabitants in 2010.
