= Brevikshalvön =

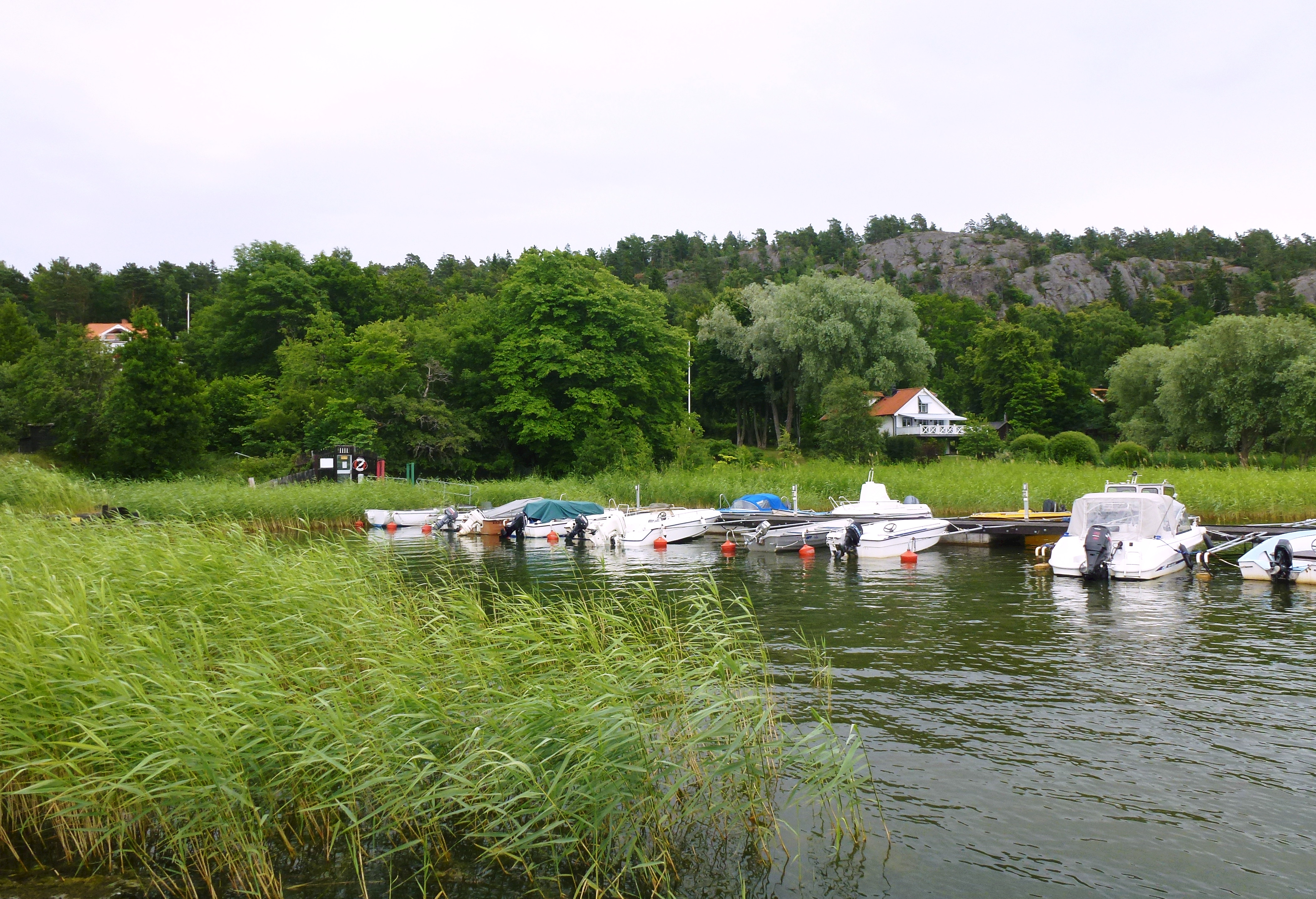

- Location within Stockholm Location within Sweden
- Coordinates: 59°13′N 18°21′E
- Country: Sweden
- Province: Södermanland
- County: Stockholm County
- Municipality: Tyresö Municipality

Area
  - Total: 6.0 km^{2} (2.3 sq mi)

Population (31 December 2010)
  - Total: 2,018
  - Density: 337/km^{2} (870/sq mi)
- Time zone: UTC+1 (CET)
  - Summer (DST): UTC+2 (CEST)

Brevikshalvön is a locality situated in Tyresö Municipality, Stockholm County, Sweden with 2,018 inhabitants in 2010.
