= Tyresö AFF Royal Crowns =

Swedish sports club with American football as its only section

Tyresö Royal Crowns
- Founded: 3/8/1990
- League: Superserien
- Based in: Tyresö, Sweden
- Stadium: Tyresövallen (2,700)
- Colors: Red and yellow
- Owner: Member owned
- President: Casper Winsnes
- Head coach: Noghor Jemide
- Championships: 2001, 2026
- Website: www.royalcrowns.se/

Tyresö Royal Crowns was a Swedish sports club established in 1990 with American football as its only section. The club played at Tyresövallen in the municipality of Tyresö in the southeastern part of the Stockholm metropolitan area. A one time national champion (2001). In 2026 Tyresö AFF was discontinued and replaced by Tyresö Royal Crowns IF.

The club also contain several youth sections.

== History ==
=== Establishment ===
The club was founded on March 8, 1990, by high school students Martin Engdahl and Andreas Ehrenreich at Tyresö High School. 98 attendees elected Ehrenreich as first club president.

=== Grounds ===
- 2010– Tyresövallen (renaming and renovation of Bollmoravallen)
- 2006–2009 Bollmoravallen
- 1997–2005 Bollmoravallen/Trollbäckens Idrottsplats (Dalskoleängen, junior teams)
- 1990–1997 Centralparken/Fornuddsängen

=== Club name ===
The club elected the name of Royal Crowns by voting. Truckers and Wild Oxen were other popular suggestions.

== Per season ==
Year	League	Tier	Placement	Record (W-T-L)	Scoring	Post-season	Record	Scoring	Coach
2024	Superserien	1	3	5-2	240:151	Lost in Semis	1-1	63:36	Noghor Jemide
2023	Superserien	1	2	4-2	170:84	Lost in Finals	1-1	62:67	Noghor Jemide
2022	Superserien	1	4	1-5	115:121	Lost in Semis	0-1	22:35	Carl Haglind
2021	Division 1 North	2	1	6-0	187:12	Qualifier	1-0	49:6	Carl Haglind
2020	Division 1 North	2	3	2-4	94:163	Did not qualify	N/A	N/A	Daniel Myrsten
2019	Superettan	2	1	4-2	154:69	Lost in Semis	1-1	47:74	Marcus Juhlin
2018	Division 1 East	2	1	5-0	269:71	Won Division 1	3-0	141:82	Leo Billgren
2017	Superserien	1	6	0-10	83:429	Did not qualify	N/A	N/A	Leo Billgren
2016	Superserien	1	4	5-5	262:277	Lost in Semis	0–1	21:24	Andreas Ehrenreich
2015	Superserien	1	1	10-0	462:154	Lost in Semis	0–1	25:28	Andreas Ehrenreich
2014	Superserien	1	2	9–1	371:134	Lost in Semis	0–1	13:19	Terry Kleinsmith
2013	Superserien	1	1	9–1	349:56	Lost in Semis	0–1	21:28	Terry Kleinsmith
2012	Superserien	1	1	9–1	360:152	Runners-up	1–1	69:30	Leo Billgren
2011	Superserien	1	2	8–2	301:140	Runners-up	1–1	63:38	Leo Billgren
2010	Superserien	1	3	5–5	275:196	Runners-up	1–1	45:56	Leo Billgren
2009	Superserien	1	4	3–7	206:372	Lost in semis	0–1	7:68	Todd Ferguson
2008	Superserien	1	5	3–9	196:308	Did not qualify	N/A	N/A	Andreas Ehrenreich
2007	Superserien	1	5	0–8	100:293	Did not qualify	N/A	N/A	Jan Jenmert
2006	Superettan	2	1	10–0	537:60	Advancement	1–0	35:20	Jan Jenmert
2005	Superettan	2	3	7–2	367:159	N/A	N/A	N/A	Jan Jenmert
2004	Superserien	1	5	4–6	274:389	Relegation	1–1	76:81	Fred Armstrong
2003	Superserien	1	4	2–6	188:208	Lost in semis	0–1	12:33	Fred Armstrong
2002	Superserien	1	3	8–2	269:118	Lost in semis	1–1	27:51	Jan Jenmert
2001	Superserien	1	2	6–3	275:143	Swedish Champions	2–2	99:122	Jan Jenmert
2000	Superserien	1	3	8–4	396:225	Runners-up	1–1	52:62	Jan Jenmert
1999	Superserien	1	6	4–6	266:270	Did not qualify	N/A	N/A	Jan Jenmert
1998	Superserien	1	3	7–3	288:295	Lost in semis	0–1	9:22	Thomas Ahlberg
1997	Division 1 North	2	1	9–0	301:71	Advancement	1–0	37:12	Thomas Ahlberg
1996	Division 1 North	2	?	5–5	174:198	N/A	N/A	N/A	Thomas Hill
1995	Division 2 East	3	1	7-1-2	190:91	Advancement	N/A	N/A	Thomas Hill
1994	Division 2 East	3	3	5–4	156:103	N/A	N/A	N/A	Tom Lynch
1993	Division 2 East	3	6	1–5	76:100	N/A	N/A	N/A	Thomas Hill
1992	Division 3 North	4	2	4–1	100:28	Advancement	N/A	N/A	Tom Bell
1991	Division 3 North	4	5	1–4	68:151	N/A	N/A	N/A	Tom Bell
32				170-1-110	7760:5627		16–17	910:923	

== Notable import and export players ==
Bahamas	Julian Waldron	Defensive tackle	None
USA	Alexander, Kelton	Cornerback	UCLA
USA	Cooley, Jon	Quarterback	Auburn
USA	DeGeorgia, Jarrod	Quarterback	Wayne State
USA	Edwards, Sha-Ron	Runningback	Illinois State
USA	Goree, Jayce	Quarterback	Glenville State
USA	Guynn, Jermaine	Defensive End	Purdue
USA	Kirkegaard, Colby	Quarterback	Wyoming
Canada	Kleinsmith, Terry	Quarterback	Simon Fraser
Canada	Krajewski, Adam	Center	Simon Fraser
USA	McCoy, Charles	Cornerback/Punter	None
United Kingdom	Melero, Natal	Cornerback	NTU
Serbia	Milinkovich, Max	Runningback	Illinois Wesleyan
USA	Novara, Mark	Quarterback	Lakeland
USA	Patterson, Clinton	Quarterback	Gardner Webb
USA	Pentz, Ronnie	Linebacker	UC-San Diego
USA	Preston, Andrew	Safety	San Diego St.
USA	Rasmussen, Brian	Quarterback	Eau Claire
USA	Selway, Dan	Quarterback	University of Redlands
USA	Sherden, Tyler	Runningback	Luther
USA	Williams, Madei	Quarterback	Southern Illinois
USA	Winchester, Aaron	Runningback/Cornerback	Western Michigan
Sweden	Bergholm, Johan	Fullback	Crookston
Sweden	Blomwall, Carl-John	Center	Temple
Sweden	Eriksson, Henrik	Wide Receiver	La Crosse
Sweden	Eriksson, Håkan	Quarterback	Crookston
Sweden	Fernlund, Peter	Strong Safety	Orange County
Sweden	Frings, Martin	Center	La Crosse
Sweden	Gustafsson, Lars	Runningback	Dodge City
Sweden	Gustafsson-Strauss, Oscar	Guard	Duluth
Sweden	Hansson, Alexander	Defensive End	Crookston
Sweden	Hont, Andreas	Defensive Tackle	Benedictine
Sweden	Jonsson, Mikael	Guard	Crookston
Sweden	Karlsson, Nicklas	Runningback	Northwood
Sweden	Lejon, Jörgen	Defensive End	La Crosse
Sweden	Magnell, Markus	Linebacker	Northwood
Sweden	Mesaros, Gustav	Defensive End	Charleston Southern
Sweden	Minja, Philip	Strong Safety	La Crosse
Sweden	Pandrea, Gheorghe	Runningbackr	Crookston
Sweden	Rauge, Johan	Fullback	Southern Utah
Sweden	Rosenholtz, Richard	Defensive End	Benedictine

== Youth programs ==
=== Under 21 ===
The club competed with an under 21 team only in one international friendly against the Helsinki Roosters in 2002.

=== Under 19 ===
The under 19 is the oldest existing youth program and enjoyed particular success in the seasons 2009–2011 with three back-to-back national championships. The program have played in five national championship games and won three (2011 Solna/Täby 16–15, 2010 Arlanda 24–13, 2018 Arlanda 17–14). 2019 was the first year the club did not field a U19 team, breaking a 26-year streak.

=== Under 17 ===
The under 17 program was established after reconstruction of the youth leagues.

=== Under 16 ===
The under 16 program was disbanded after the reconstruction of the youth leagues. Until that point the program won one national championship after competing in a total of five national championship games (2003 Ystad 12–6).

=== Under 15 ===
The under 15 program was established after reconstruction of the youth leagues.

=== Under 13 ===
Tyresö has the oldest U13 program in Sweden playing an inaugural exhibition game August 22, 1999.

=== Under 11 ===
The U11 program split from U13 in 2013.

=== Under 9 ===
The U9 program split from U11 in 2023.

=== Football School ===
The school was established in 2023.

=== Flag football ===
Flag football was discontinued in the mid-1990s.

=== School teams ===
Some years the club organize games between local middle schools in a tournament known as Karl Holfves Minne, in memory of deceased offensive lineman Karl Holfve.

== Rivalries ==
While in the lower tiers of the league system, the games against Åkersberga were classic rivalry games. Since Tyresö and Carlstad both entered Superserien in 1998, the two teams have had many fierce battles with the latter most frequently coming out on top. From 2010 to 2012 the teams faced off in the national championship three years back-to-back with Carlstad as the victors every time.

Among all teams ever in existence in Sweden, there are only three teams with a winning record facing Tyresö; Handelshögskolan(defunct), Carlstad, and Stockholm.
