= Tyresö Palace =

Palace in Sweden

Coordinates: 59°14′07″N 18°18′17″E

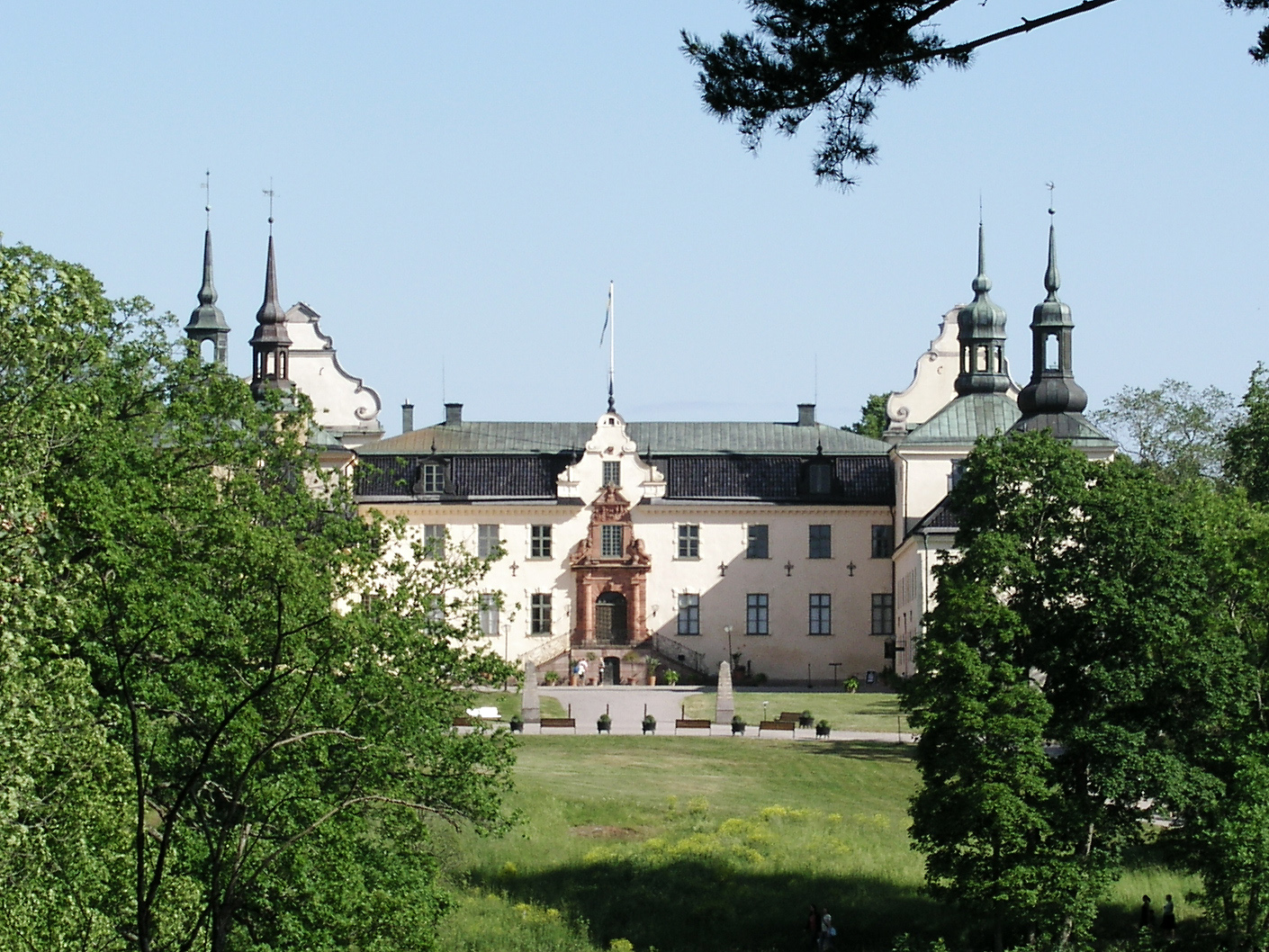
Tyresö Palace

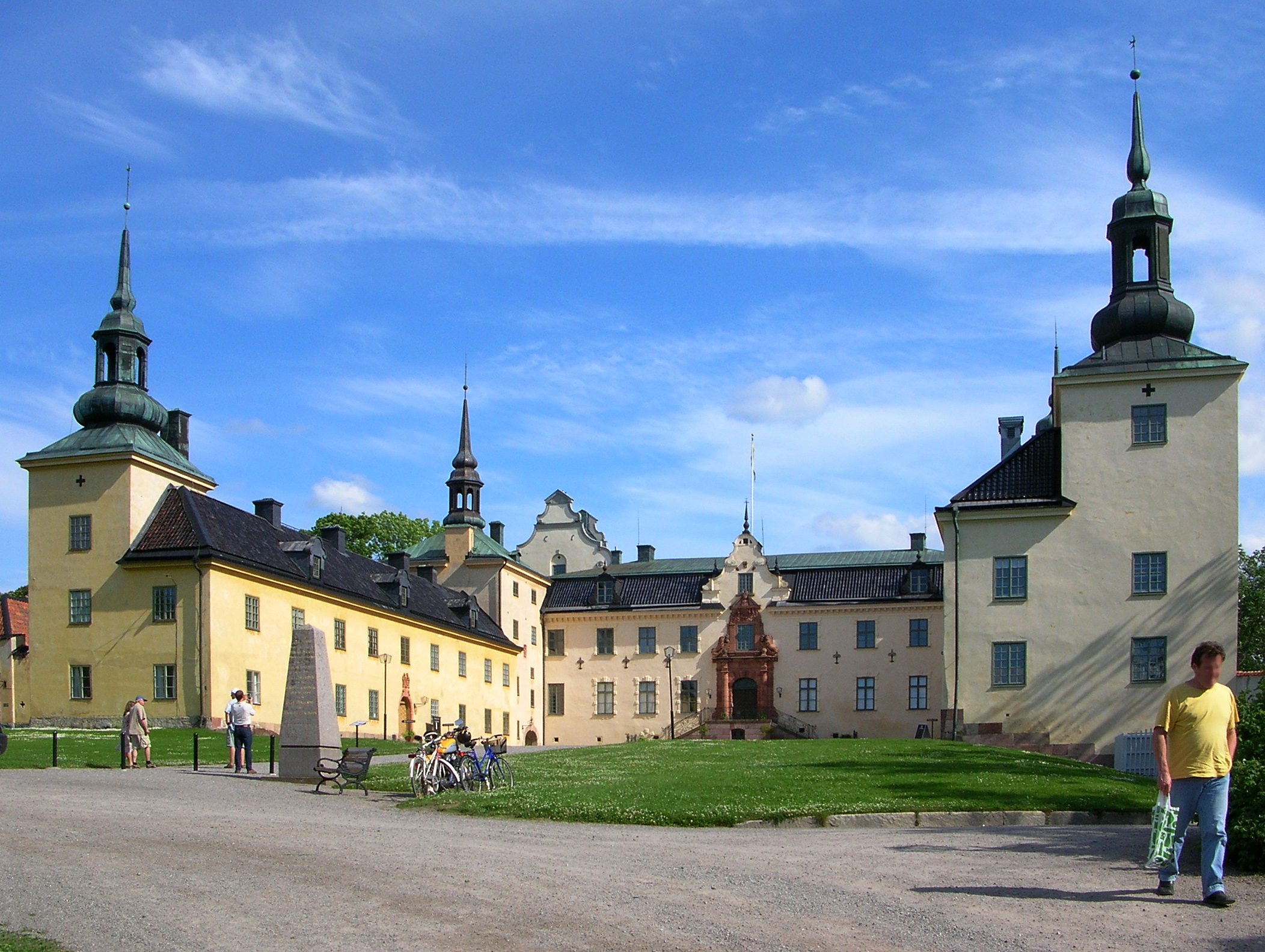
Tyresö Palace

Tyresö Palace (Swedish: Tyresö slott) is a 17th-century palace in Tyresö, Stockholm County, Sweden, about 25 km south-east of central Stockholm.

== History ==
The construction of the palace began in the 1620s and completed in 1636 by the Lord High Steward (Swedish: riksdrots) Gabriel Oxenstierna. He also constructed the nearby Tyresö Church (Swedish: Tyresö kyrka), which was inaugurated with his own burial in 1641.

The palace was inherited in 1648 by Maria Sofia De la Gardie, who had married Gustaf Gabrielsson Oxenstierna, nephew of Swedish Regent and Lord High Chancellor Axel Oxenstierna. Both she and her husband's family were extremely wealthy. Maria Sofia resided in Tyresö Palace, from where she managed her estates around the Baltic Sea, until 1694. Between 1699 and 1737, the writer Maria Gustava Gyllenstierna lived at the palace.

During the 1770s the palace was modernized and the first English garden in Sweden was created. Planned by the garden architect Fredrik Magnus Piper, it is a mixture of an English park, a Swedish floral meadow and images from a fairy tale - with the ancient forest as its ultimate source of inspiration. The extensive, apparently natural landscape gardens still exist today. Today Tyresö Palace is a museum.

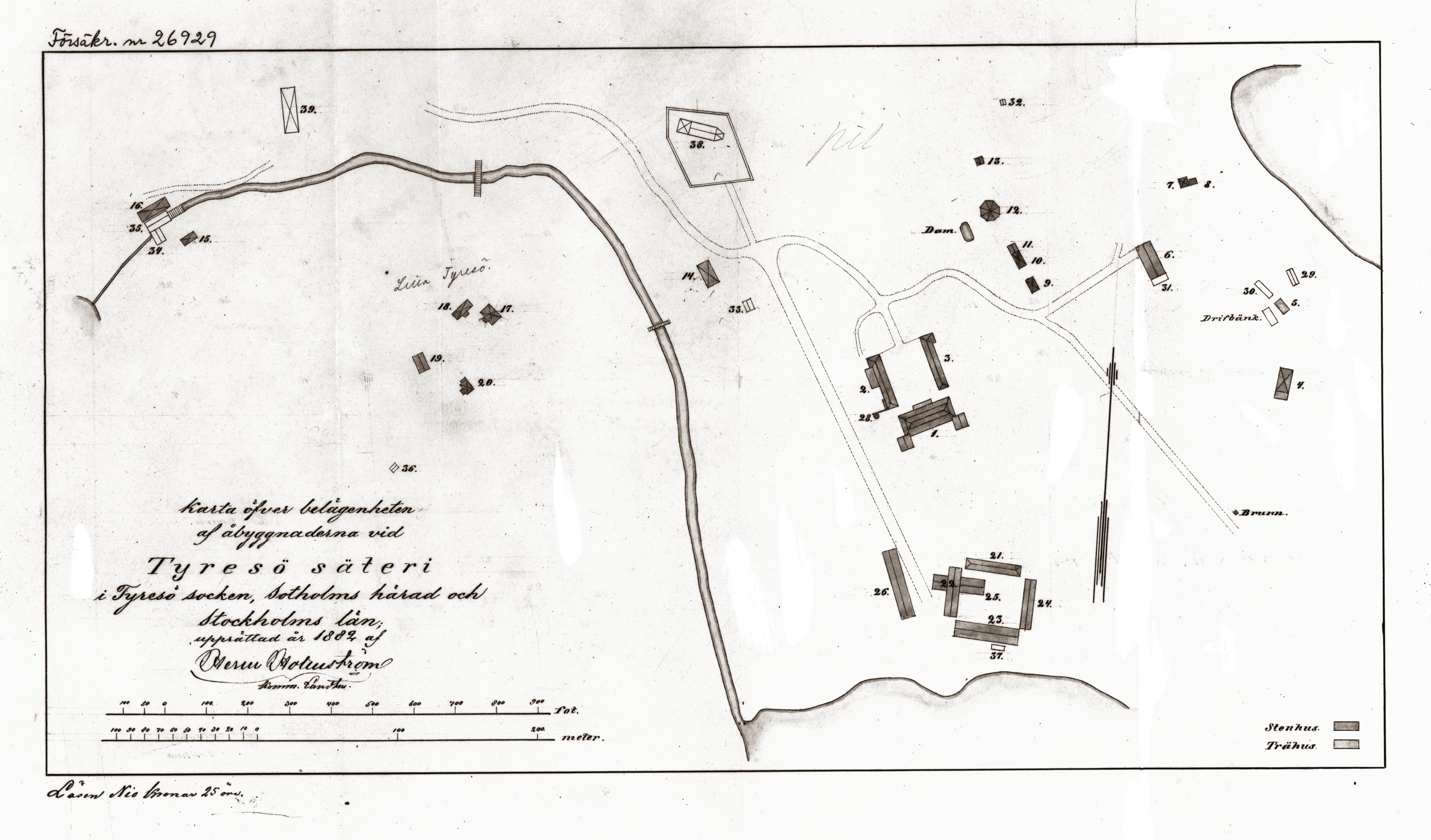
Map of the palace grounds from 1882.

(Papal) Marquis Claes Lagergren purchased Tyresö Palace in 1892. Assisted by architect Isak Gustaf Clason, the Marquis rebuilt the palace in a national romantic style, inspired by original drawings from the 17th century. The Marquis wanted the palace kept as a living document of Swedish history, and after he died in 1930, he left Tyresö Palace to a museum foundation, the Nordic Museum (Swedish: Nordiska museet). Today the Nordic Museum owns the palace, which is open for guided tours during the summer.
