= Tyresö Municipality =

Tyresö Municipality Tyresö kommun
- Municipality
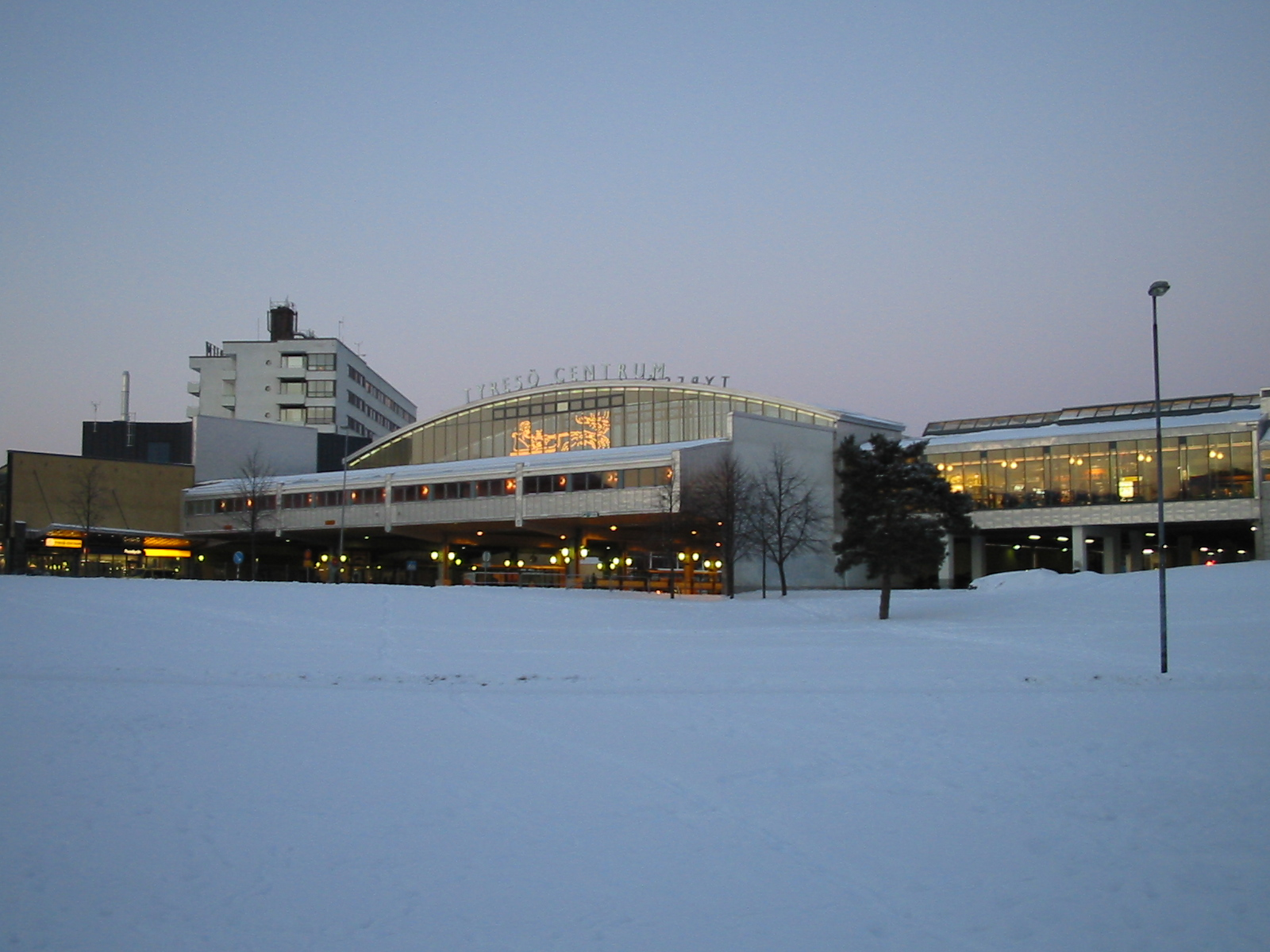
- The Tyresö Centrum enclosed shopping centre in Bollmora

- Coat of arms

- Coordinates: 59°14′N 18°13′E
- Country: Sweden
- County: Stockholm County
- Seat: Bollmora

Area
  - Total: 100.53 km^{2} (38.81 sq mi)
  - Land: 69.25 km^{2} (26.74 sq mi)
  - Water: 31.28 km^{2} (12.08 sq mi)
- Area as of 1 January 2014.

Population (30 June 2025)
  - Total: 49,416
  - Density: 713.6/km^{2} (1,848/sq mi)
- Time zone: UTC+1 (CET)
  - Summer (DST): UTC+2 (CEST)
- ISO 3166 code: SE
- Province: Södermanland
- Municipal code: 0138
- Website: www.tyreso.se
- Density is calculated using land area only.

Tyresö Municipality (Swedish: Tyresö kommun) is a municipality in Stockholm County in east central Sweden on the coast of the Baltic Sea.

Most of Tyresö Municipality lies within the Stockholm urban area.

== History ==
The first humans arrived in what today is Tyresö Municipality somewhere around the 3rd millennium BC. It would not be until about the 7th century that permanent settlements would start appearing though. There are some graves and other remnants left from this prehistoric time.

The Tyresö estate has its origins in the 14th century. During the 17th century the estate was at its largest, covering nearly the entire current area of the municipality. The Tyresö Palace and Tyresö Church were built during this century, with the palace completed in 1636 and the church in 1640.

Tyresö was an important industrial centre in the Stockholm region between the 16th and 19th centuries, thanks to the watermills that could be built on the streams between the lakes. The waterwheels in the municipal arms represent the three hydropower facilities at Nyfors, Uddby and Follbrinksströmmen. The industries included rolling mills, gristmills, forges, paper mills, sawmills, and a brickworks. None of the watermills are left today. The Uddby mill burned down in 1895, and a hydroelectric power plant was built in its place, which still stands today and is the only such plant in the Stockholm area.

During the early 20th century, the large land area of the Tyresö estate began to be divided into lots, and summer cottages began to be built. Some quite luxurious ones were built in the Brevik area. The rate of construction increased rapidly in the early decades of the century. From the 1950s onwards, the summer cottages began to be converted into year-round dwellings at a rapid pace.

From the 1950s onwards, Bollmora experienced a huge expansion rate, especially after the legislation Lex Bollmora in 1959 which allowed municipal real estate companies to operate in other municipalities than their own. A municipal centre formed in Bollmora, Bollmora Centrum, which was inaugurated in 1965. The Million Programme put its distinctive print on Tyresö as well, especially Bollmora: many of the apartment building areas come from that programme.

During the expansive phase from the 1950s onwards, the population of Tyresö has grown from about 5,000 to just over 44,000 at present.

The Bollmora Centrum was rebuilt in the early 1990s to be an enclosed shopping centre, and renamed Tyresö Centrum.

In August 1999 a large wildfire destroyed about 10% of the Tyresta National Park.

== Subdivisions ==
There are no administrative subdivisions of Tyresö Municipality, but there are some other formal and less formal subdivisions.

=== Districts ===
There are three main districts in Tyresö. This is a kind of everyday reference subdivision to refer to the different main parts of the municipality.

- Bollmora in the northwest – consisting of apartment buildings of about 2–8 stories high, terraced houses and detached houses and some industrial areas. The municipal centre, Tyresö centre, is located here.
- Trollbäcken in west – consisting mostly of detached houses.
- Gamla Tyresö ("Old Tyresö") in the east and south. The eastern area consists of detached, semi–detached, and terraced houses, and summer cottages, a large part of which are being converted to year-round use. The Tyresö Palace and Tyresö Church from the 17th century are located here. In the south there is a large forest, containing about half of the Tyresta National Park on the Tyresö side.

=== Urban areas ===
Population of urban areas within municipal borders, as of 2000:

- Brevik peninsula: 1,556
- Raksta: 537
- Stockholm (part of): 36,483

=== Residential areas ===
Number or inhabitants per residential area as of 2006:

- Bollmora: 14 861
- Trollbäcken: 11 916
- Krusboda: 3 773
- Tyresö Strand: 3 517
- Öringe: 2 536
- Brevikshalvön: 2 101
- Lindalen: 1 828
- South/East Tyresö: 860
- "Unspecified": 84
- Total: 41,476

== Geography ==
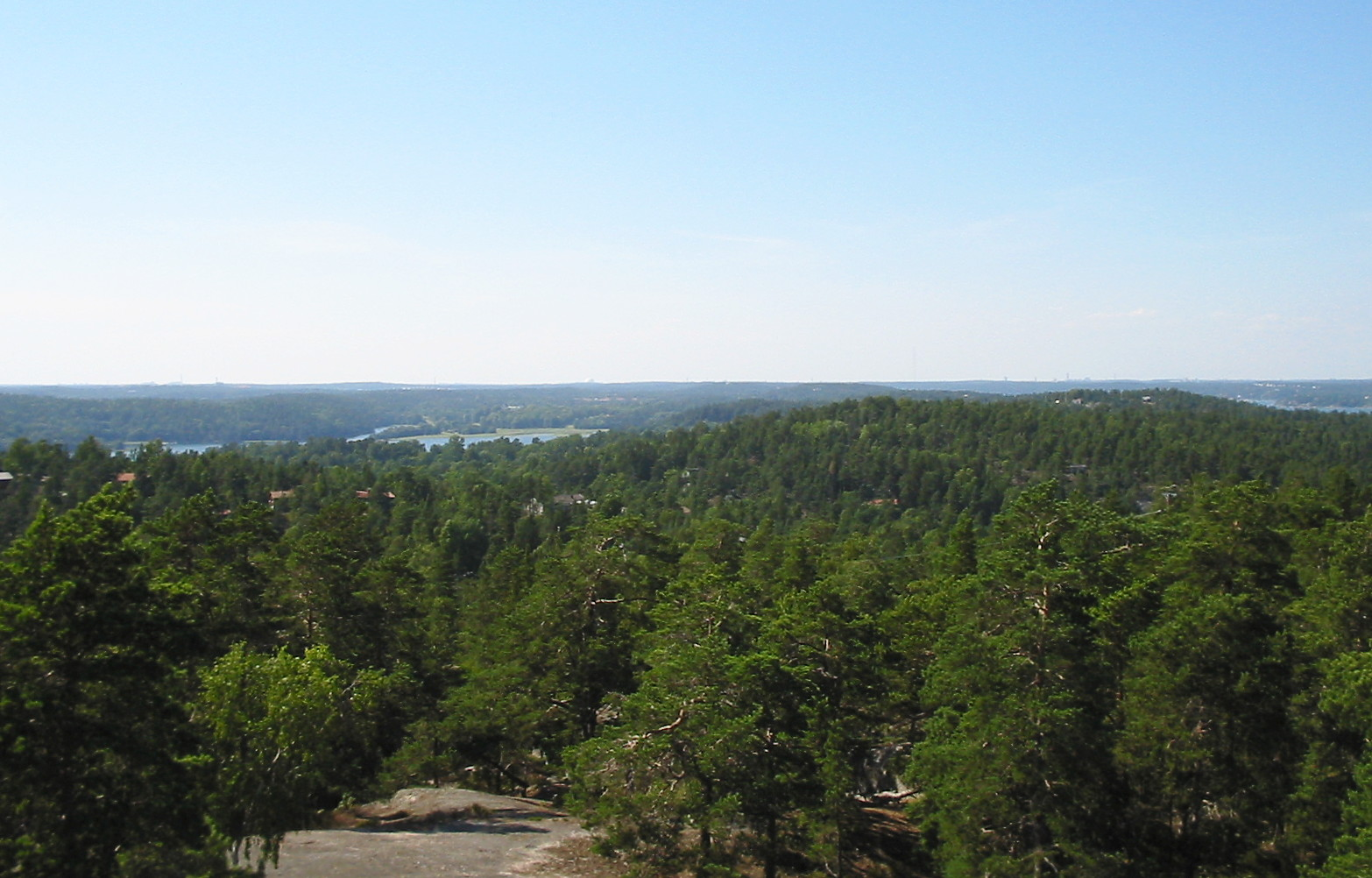
View from Telegrafberget towards Stockholm. The Avicii Arena (Globen) can be seen on the horizon.

The vast bulk of Tyresö lies on the Södertörn peninsula, with some islands in the Baltic sea, of which Ägnö and Härsö are the largest ones. There are many lakes in Tyresö, being part of the Tyresån Lake System. In the south there is a large old forest of which a part is in the Tyresta national park, and other large parts are in other nature reserves.

The terrain is typical for the region, low hills and valleys formed by the last ice age. The highest point is at Telegrafberget, 84 metres (276 feet) above sea level.

Tyresö has a land border with Stockholm in the northwest, with Nacka in the north, and with Haninge in the south, a lake border with Huddinge in the west, and a sea border with Värmdö in the east and northeast.

== Demography ==
=== Population development ===
Population development in Tyresö Municipality 1970–2019
| Year | Population |
|---|---|
| 1970 | 27,112 |
| 1975 | 29,366 |
| 1980 | 31,061 |
| 1985 | 32,161 |
| 1990 | 33,973 |
| 1995 | 36,627 |
| 2000 | 39,071 |
| 2005 | 41,134 |
| 2010 | 42,947 |
| 2015 | 46,177 |
| 2017 | 47,304 |
| 2019 | 48,333 |
Source: SCB – SCB - Folkmängd efter region och år.

=== 2022 by district ===
This is a demographic table based on Tyresö Municipality's electoral districts in the 2022 Swedish general election sourced from SVT's election platform, in turn taken from SCB official statistics.

In total there were 48,981 residents, including 35,234 Swedish citizens of voting age. 46.8% voted for the left coalition and 51.9% for the right coalition. Indicators are in percentage points except population totals and income.

| Location | Residents | Citizen adults | Left vote | Right vote | Employed | Swedish parents | Foreign heritage | Income SEK | Degree |
| Location | | | % | % | | | | | |
|---|---|---|---|---|---|---|---|---|---|
| 1 Björkbacken | 1,754 | 1,379 | 52.9 | 46.1 | 81 | 66 | 34 | 23,016 | 38 |
| 2 Siken | 1,959 | 1,636 | 56.3 | 42.7 | 81 | 74 | 26 | 24,765 | 38 |
| 3 Myggdalen | 1,870 | 1,514 | 53.9 | 45.1 | 81 | 72 | 28 | 25,088 | 41 |
| 4 Nyboda | 2,132 | 1,282 | 54.5 | 43.5 | 75 | 50 | 50 | 23,140 | 29 |
| 5 Fårdala | 1,720 | 1,243 | 54.5 | 44.4 | 89 | 83 | 17 | 35,138 | 55 |
| 6 Krusboda N | 1,609 | 1,142 | 50.2 | 48.6 | 90 | 86 | 14 | 31,634 | 44 |
| 7 Krusboda S | 2,004 | 1,462 | 49.7 | 49.3 | 88 | 86 | 14 | 31,481 | 42 |
| 8 Öringe | 1,805 | 1,320 | 49.1 | 50.2 | 85 | 84 | 16 | 34,023 | 51 |
| 9 Rotvik | 2,269 | 1,506 | 44.4 | 54.8 | 85 | 84 | 16 | 36,694 | 55 |
| 10 Tyresö Strand | 1,273 | 903 | 36.7 | 62.6 | 86 | 88 | 12 | 42,648 | 57 |
| 11 Tyresö Strand C | 1,848 | 1,355 | 49.4 | 49.8 | 90 | 88 | 12 | 37,624 | 59 |
| 12 Gimmersta-Nytorp | 2,182 | 1,598 | 37.2 | 61.3 | 86 | 86 | 14 | 33,865 | 48 |
| 13 Brevikshalvön | 1,900 | 1,407 | 39.0 | 59.7 | 84 | 84 | 16 | 33,454 | 39 |
| 21 Fornudden | 2,071 | 1,446 | 37.8 | 61.6 | 85 | 87 | 13 | 40,798 | 61 |
| 22 Sofieberg | 1,804 | 1,340 | 43.6 | 55.9 | 85 | 83 | 17 | 35,335 | 55 |
| 23 Trollbäcken V | 1,802 | 1,369 | 48.4 | 50.9 | 81 | 81 | 19 | 29,695 | 50 |
| 24 Skälsätra | 2,525 | 1,741 | 42.3 | 56.8 | 85 | 84 | 16 | 35,005 | 52 |
| 25 Trollbäcken Ö | 2,022 | 1,465 | 41.8 | 57.3 | 86 | 83 | 17 | 34,164 | 53 |
| 26 Hanviken | 2,213 | 1,566 | 41.5 | 57.9 | 87 | 84 | 16 | 36,468 | 52 |
| 27 Lindalen | 1,736 | 1,362 | 43.6 | 54.9 | 85 | 77 | 23 | 30,729 | 45 |
| 28 Bollmoraberg | 2,594 | 1,806 | 50.6 | 47.8 | 78 | 63 | 37 | 24,959 | 35 |
| 29 Granängsringen | 2,416 | 1,376 | 57.3 | 39.0 | 66 | 41 | 59 | 19,182 | 23 |
| 30 Farmarstigen V | 1,914 | 1,396 | 48.0 | 50.9 | 81 | 78 | 22 | 28,489 | 42 |
| 31 Farmarstigen Ö | 2,255 | 1,688 | 48.3 | 49.8 | 77 | 72 | 28 | 26,659 | 36 |
| 32 Masten | 1,304 | 932 | 45.1 | 52.7 | 82 | 62 | 38 | 27,718 | 50 |
Source: SVT

=== Residents with a foreign background ===
On 31 December 2017 the number of people with a foreign background (persons born outside Sweden or with two parents born outside Sweden) was 10 283, or 21.74% of the population (47 304 on 31 December 2017). On 31 December 2002 the number of residents with a foreign background was (per the same definition) 7 108, or 17.90% of the population (39 720 on 31 December 2002). On 31 December 2017 there were 47 304 residents in Tyresö, of which 7 710 people (16.30%) were born in a country other than Sweden. Divided by country in the table below – the Nordic countries as well as the 12 most common countries of birth outside Sweden for Swedish residents have been included, with other countries of birth bundled together by continent by Statistics Sweden.

Country of birth
31 December 2017
| 1 | Sweden | 39,594 |
| 2 | European Union: Other countries | 1,209 |
| 3 | Finland | 1,152 |
| 4 | South America | 846 |
| 5 | Asia: Other countries | 813 |
| 6 | Poland | 682 |
| 7 | Africa: Other countries | 452 |
| 8 | Europe outside the EU: other countries | 322 |
| 9 | Thailand | 250 |
| 10 | Iraq | 237 |
| 11 | Syria | 233 |
| 12 | Germany | 226 |
| 13 | North America | 206 |
| 14 | Iran | 181 |
| 15 | Norway | 140 |
| 16 | Turkey | 127 |
| 17 | Afghanistan | 111 |
| 18 | Yugoslavia/Yugoslavia; SFR Yugoslavia/Serbia and Montenegro | 109 |
| 19 | Denmark | 88 |
| 20 | Eritrea | 87 |
| 21 | Bosnia and Herzegovina | 83 |
| 22 | Somalia | 52 |
| 23 | Oceania | 49 |
| 24 | Soviet Union | 29 |
| 25 | Iceland | 17 |
| 26 | Unknown country of birth | 9 |

== Public transportation ==
Tyresö is served by the county-wide public transport system operated by AB Storstockholms Lokaltrafik.

Tyresö is one of the few municipalities in Stockholm County without rail connections. Most of the bus routes connect to the Stockholm Metro at Gullmarsplan, but there are also buses running directly to and from central Stockholm.

== Twin towns ==
Tyresö is twinned with:

- Cēsis, Latvia (since 1991)
- Porvoo, Finland (since 1966)
- Savigny-le-Temple, France (since 1985)
- Wejherowo, Poland (since 1993)
- Bilohorodka community, Ukraine (since 2023)

== Notable natives and residents ==
- Ingvar Carlsson, politician – former Prime Minister of Sweden
- Tony Magnusson, professional skateboarder in the 1980s and 1990s; owner of the Osiris Shoe Company
- Thomas Enqvist, tennis player
- Peter Pohl, writer, currently lives in Tyresö
- Johan Garpenlöv, coach of Djurgårdens IF Hockey, and former ice hockey player for the Florida Panthers in the U.S. NHL
- Elli Avram, Bollywood actress, model, dancer and television personality
- Olof Kajbjer, Professional CS:GO player for Faze Clan
- Linus Lundqvist, racing driver

== Sports ==
The following sports clubs are located in Tyresö Municipality:

- Tyresö FF
- Tyresö AFF Royal Crowns
- Hanvikens SK
- Tyresö KK

== Controversies ==
In 2024, Tyresö Municipality received criticism for almost doubling the salary of its vice chairman Anki Svensson, without providing any clear justification for the salary increase. Politician who previously held this position also criticised the unjustified salary increase.
