= Övre Rudasjön =

Lake in Haninge municipality, Sweden

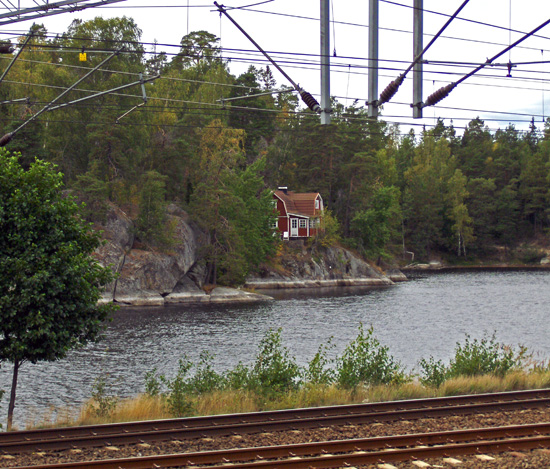
- As seen from the commuter railway station

- Location within Stockholm
- Location: Haninge Municipality, south Stockholm County
- Coordinates: 59°10′8.94″N 18°08′2.30″E
- Primary inflows: Trylen, Nedre Rudasjön
- Primary outflows: Dammträsk, Drevviken
- Basin countries: Sweden
- Surface area: 0.113 km^{2} (0.044 sq mi)
- Average depth: 3.4 m (11 ft)
- Max. depth: 8.1 m (27 ft)
- Water volume: 0.386 km^{3} (313,000 acre⋅ft)
- Surface elevation: 34.5 m (113 ft)
- Islands: 0
- Settlements: Haninge, Handen

Övre Rudasjön (Swedish for "Upper Crucian carp Lake"), or Övre Rudan for short, is a lake in Haninge Municipality, 18 km (11 mi) south of central Stockholm, Sweden. Forming part of the Tyresån Lake System, its major inflow comes from lakes Nedre Rudasjön ("Lower Crucian carp Lake") and Trylen to the south, while its outflow passes over Dammträsk into Drevviken to the north.

The tall buildings of Handen commercial centre along the eastern shore of the lake contrast the dense forest of the Rudan Open-air Area on the opposite shore. The proximity to the commuter rail station at Handen, makes the lake easily accessible to a large number of people, while the forests surrounding it makes it attractive to open-air lovers. It is used for bathing in summers and cross-country skiing in winters.

Compared to other lakes in the Tyresån Lake System, levels of phosphorus in the lake are moderate.

Nutrition levels
PTOT	NTOT	N/P-quota	Chlor	Sight depth	Colour	TOC	pH	Alk
17 ug/L	456 ug/L	27	6 a ug/L	3,8 m (max)	34 mg/L	8 mg/L	7,2	0,28 mekv/L

With are 28 species of vascular plants by the lake and 1 species of Stoneworth in it, the lake fauna is considered relatively rich in species.

== Gallery ==
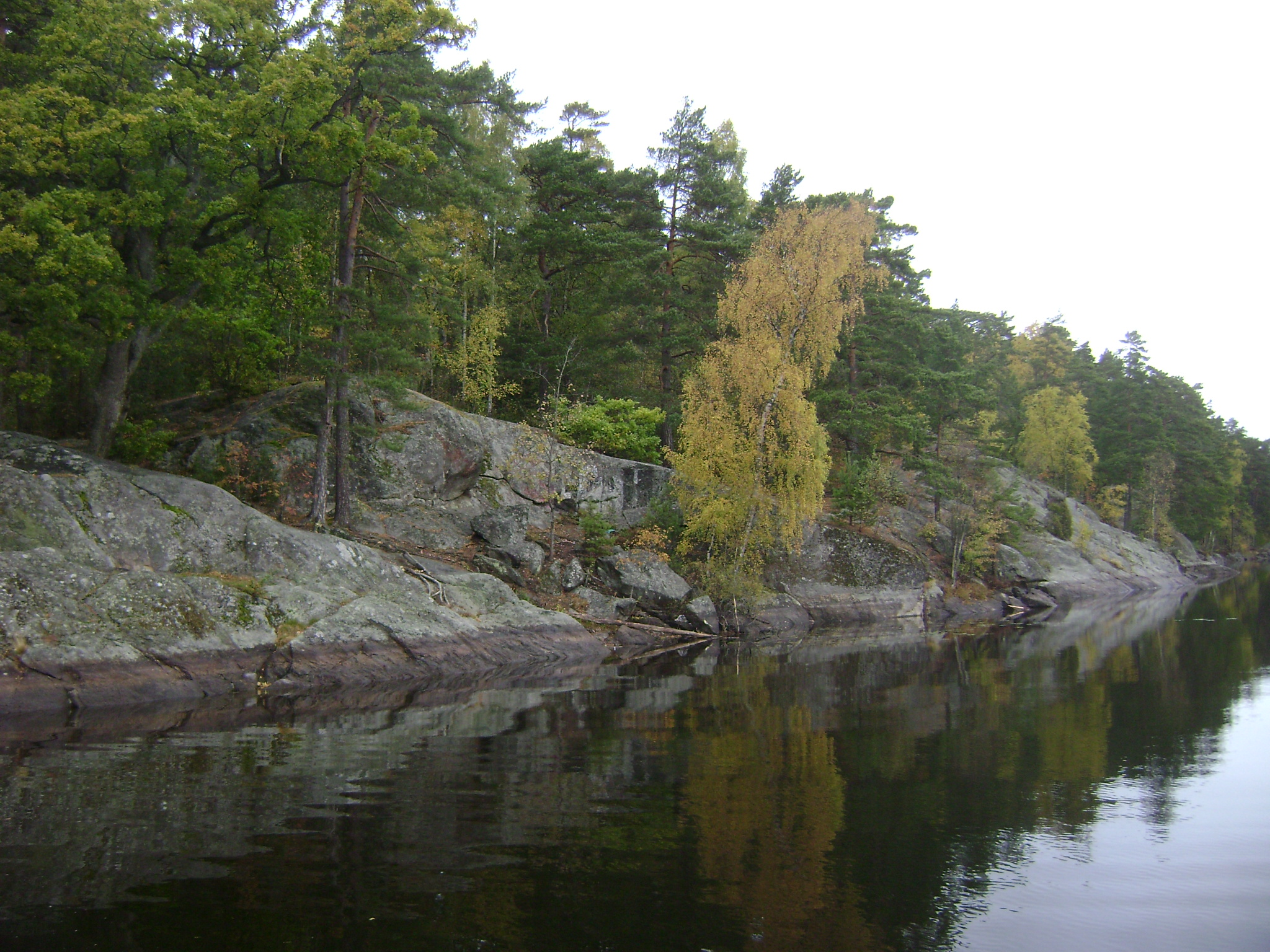

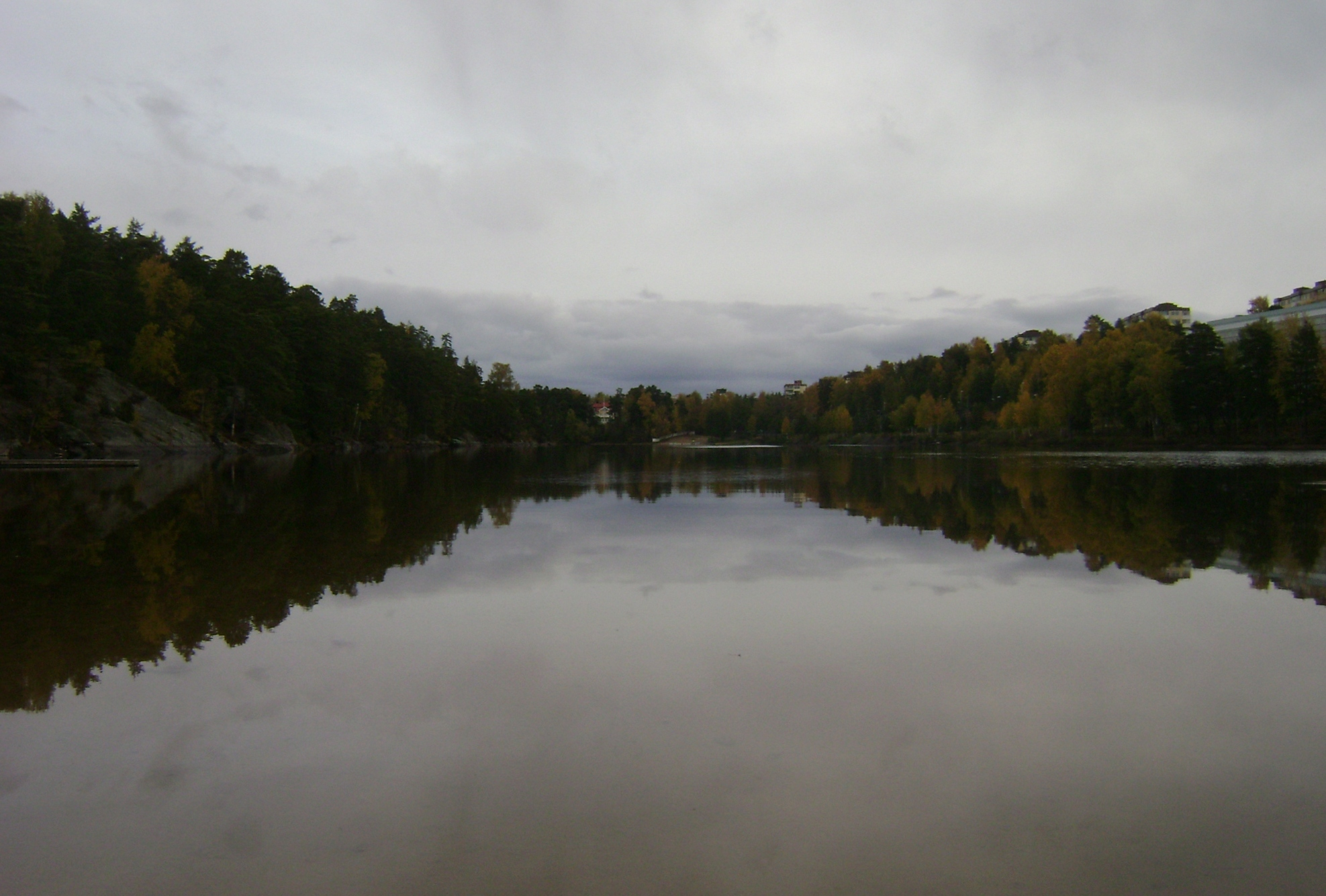

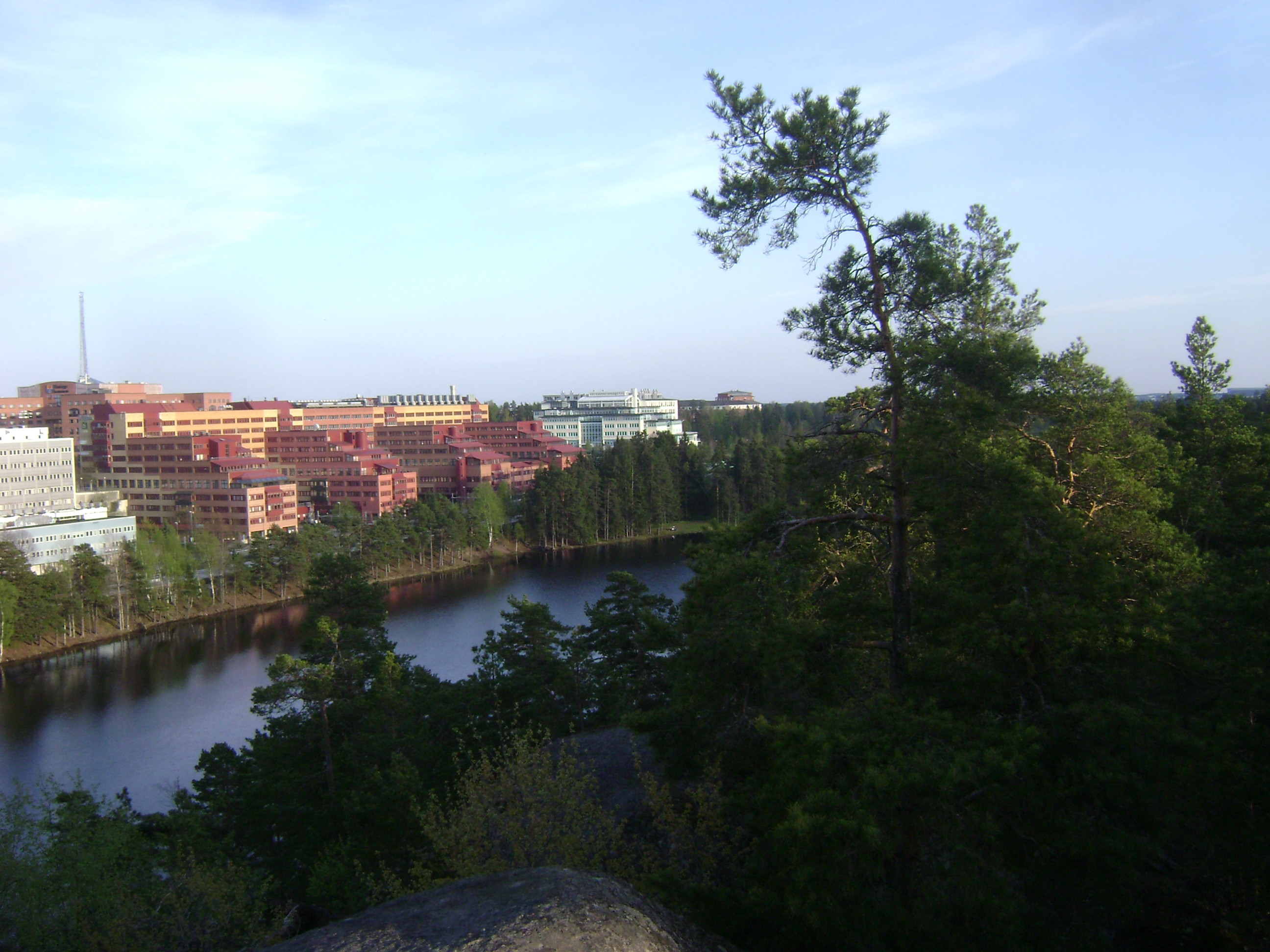
