= Dammträsk =

Lake in Haninge municipality, Sweden

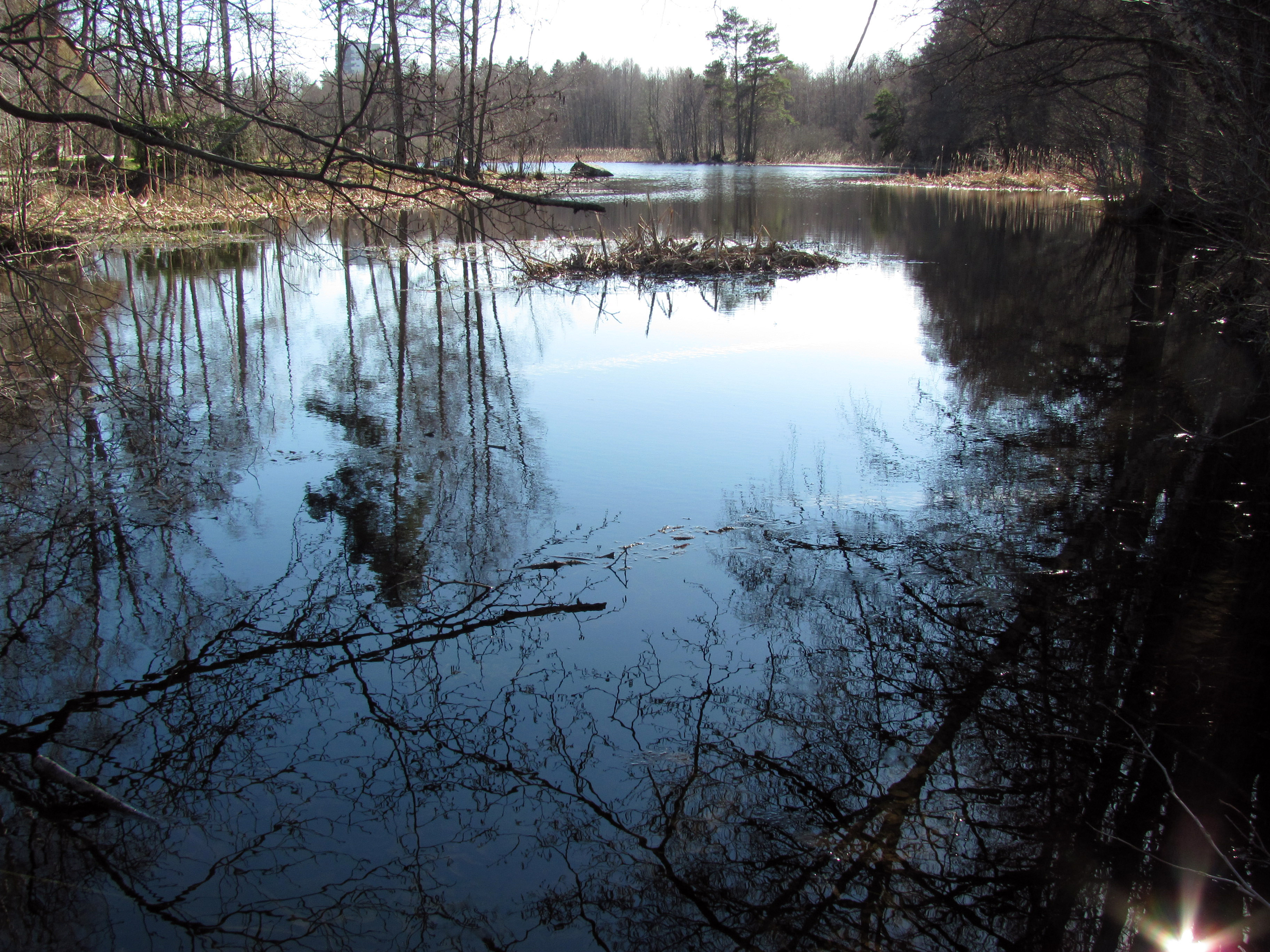

- Location within Sweden
- Coordinates: 59°10′48″N 18°08′32″E
- Primary inflows: Övre Rudasjön
- Primary outflows: Drevviken
- Basin countries: Sweden
- Surface area: 0.9 ha (2.2 acres)
- Surface elevation: 33 m (108 ft)
- Settlements: Haninge

Dammträsk (Swedish for "Pond Swamp") is a small man made lake within the Tyresån Lake System, located in Haninge Municipality, south of central Stockholm, Sweden.

The lake receives water from Övre and Nedre Rudasjön south of the lake and empties into Drevviken north of it. Located just south of the residential area Kvarntorp, and north of the densely populated central Haninge, the wetland lake receives considerable amount of nutritive salts.

== Environmental impact ==
The lake and the surrounding wetlands, together with local forests, are regarded as a valuable local natural resource. However, while the lake system as a whole is regarded as sensitive to surface runoff, Dammträsk is already too contaminated to be regarded as vulnerable. Water has been deliberately redirected from Rudasjön to Dammträsk, which reduces contamination of the downstream lake, Drevviken, since much of the waste is sedimented into the lake. The price to pay has been the dense vegetation in the lake. Two abandoned facilities by the lake, a dry cleaner and a gas station, contaminated the surrounding area. A restoration project in 2005 removed 276 tons of earth containing chlorinated hydrocarbons and 595 tons containing petroleum.

== Biodiversity ==
An inventory of the local vegetation concluded there are 27 species of vascular plants around the lake, which makes it relatively biodiverse (3/5 on a scale where 1 means high biodiversity). One of the interesting species of aquatic plants in the lake is Common Mare's Tail. Grass carp have been introduced to the lake.

== See also ==
- Geography of Stockholm
