= Nedre Rudasjön =

Lake in Sweden

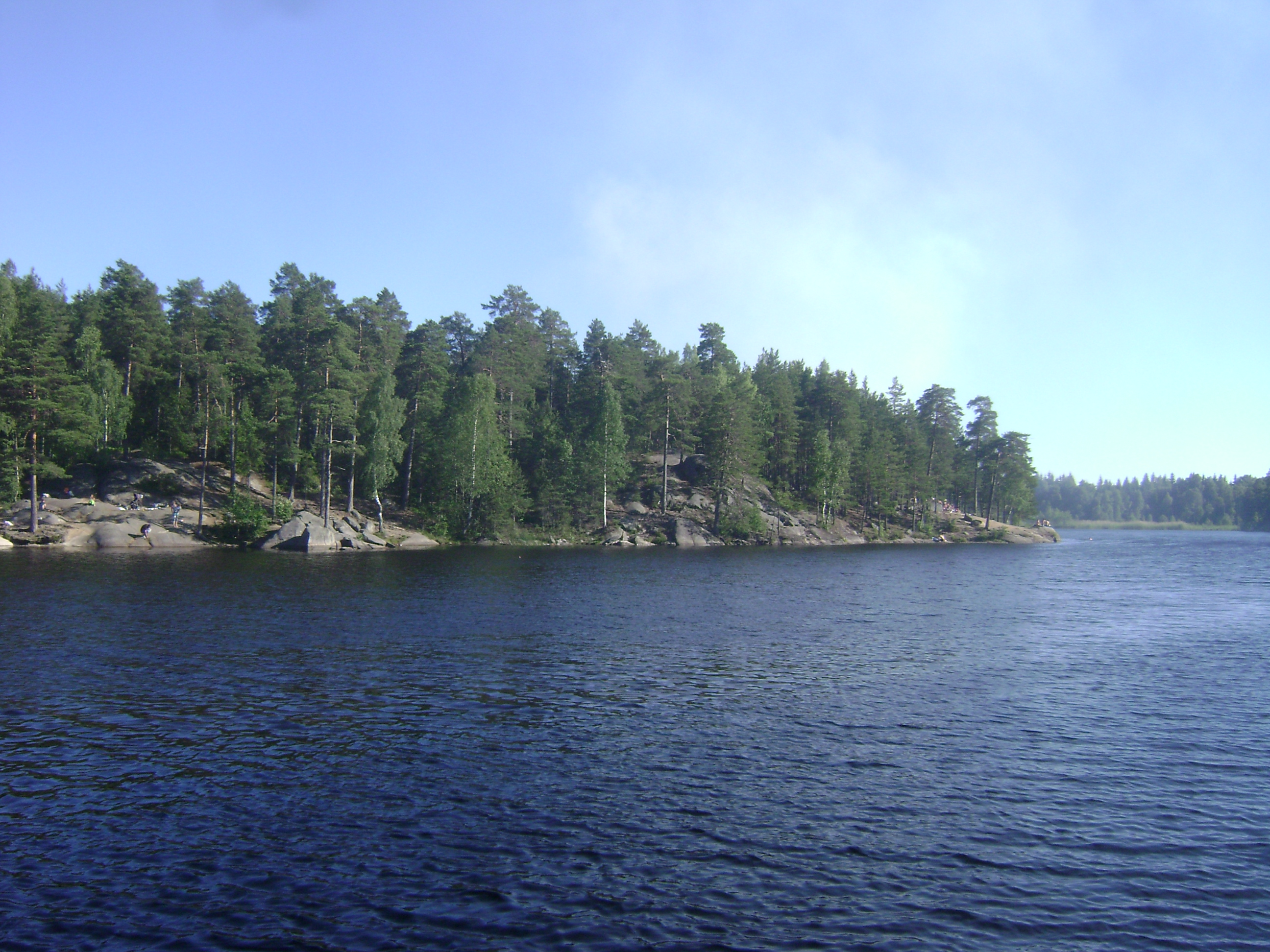

- Location within Stockholm
- Coordinates: 59°9.5′N 18°7.5′E
- Basin countries: Sweden
- Max. length: 0.59 km (0.37 mi)
- Max. width: 0.2 km (0.12 mi)
- Surface area: .0686 km^{2} (0.0265 sq mi)
- Max. depth: 14.5 m (48 ft)
- Surface elevation: 39.3 m (129 ft)

Nedre Rudasjön is a lake in Stockholm County, Södermanland, Sweden. Its maximum dimensions are approximately 590 metres by 200 metres. Nedre Rudasjön, or Nedre Rudan, is a lake in Haninge municipality in Stockholm which is part of the Tyresån's main catchment area. The lake is 14.5 meters deep, has an area of 0.0686 square kilometers, and is 39.3 meters above sea level. About 400 meters north of Nedre Rudan is Övre Rudasjön. The name Ruda is said to originate from the Old Swedish word for "clearing", but according to another theory, the name comes from the fact that there used to be plenty of carp fish ruda in the two lakes.

== History ==
During the Bronze and Iron Ages, the Upper and Lower Rudasjöarna were connected and were part of a navigable watercourse that continued through Drevviken to Kalvfjärden and the Baltic Sea. Through the land uplift, the contact was lost, but remnants of such connection and settlement are preserved at Övre Rudasjön, where the ancient castle Ruda skans probably dates from the Bronze Age. Today there is only a small river left between the lakes.

== General ==
The lake is part of Tyresån's lake system where it is drained north through Övre Rudasjön to Dammträsk and further out into Drevviken. To the south, there is small drainage to Lillsjön. The lake, which is adjacent to the Hanveden forest area, is for the most part located within the municipal part of Handen and just southwest of Haninge Centrum. A small part of the lake is part of the municipal part Jordbro.

== Outdoor area ==
The lake is part of the Rudan natural reserve where Sörmlandsleden also passes. Nedre Rudan is an important part of Rudan's outdoor area that spreads in the forests, around and in the green area between the two Rudasjöarna. Here are, among other things, Rudan's farm and Ormteatern.

The green area is also the starting point for several exercise tracks, among them is the 1.7 and 2.3-kilometer long Maxingeslingan, which stretches around Nedre Rudan. The loop is an accessibility-adapted exercise track that has a hardened, smooth surface which makes it accessible for, say, a wheelchair, permobile, or pram. [ 9 ] The loop is also illuminated and marked by sheet metal trays with the text Maxingeslingan.

On the north side of the lake, there is a small bathing area with a sandy beach and a bathing ramp with handrails. Along the loop, there are benches and several wheelchair-accessible areas. On the western side of the lake, the Maxingeslingan runs close to the water, partly on footbridges. On the east side, it extends into the forest high above the lake. In the far south, swamp forest dominates.

== Sub catchment area ==
Nedre Rudasjön is part of the sub-catchment area which SMHI calls the outlet of Övre Rudasjön. The average height is 49 meters above sea level with an area of 2.75 square kilometers. There are no catchment areas upstream, but this catchment area is the highest point. The watercourse that drains the catchment area has tributary order 2, which means that the water flows through a total of 2 watercourses before it reaches the sea after 15 kilometers. The catchment area consists mostly of forests (15 percent). The catchment area has 5.87 square kilometers of water surface, which gives it a lake percentage of 11.9 percent. The buildings in the location cover an area of 35.23 square kilometers or 71 percent of the catchment area.

== See also ==
- Rudan Nature Reserve
- List of lakes in Haninge municipality
