= Vendelsömalm =

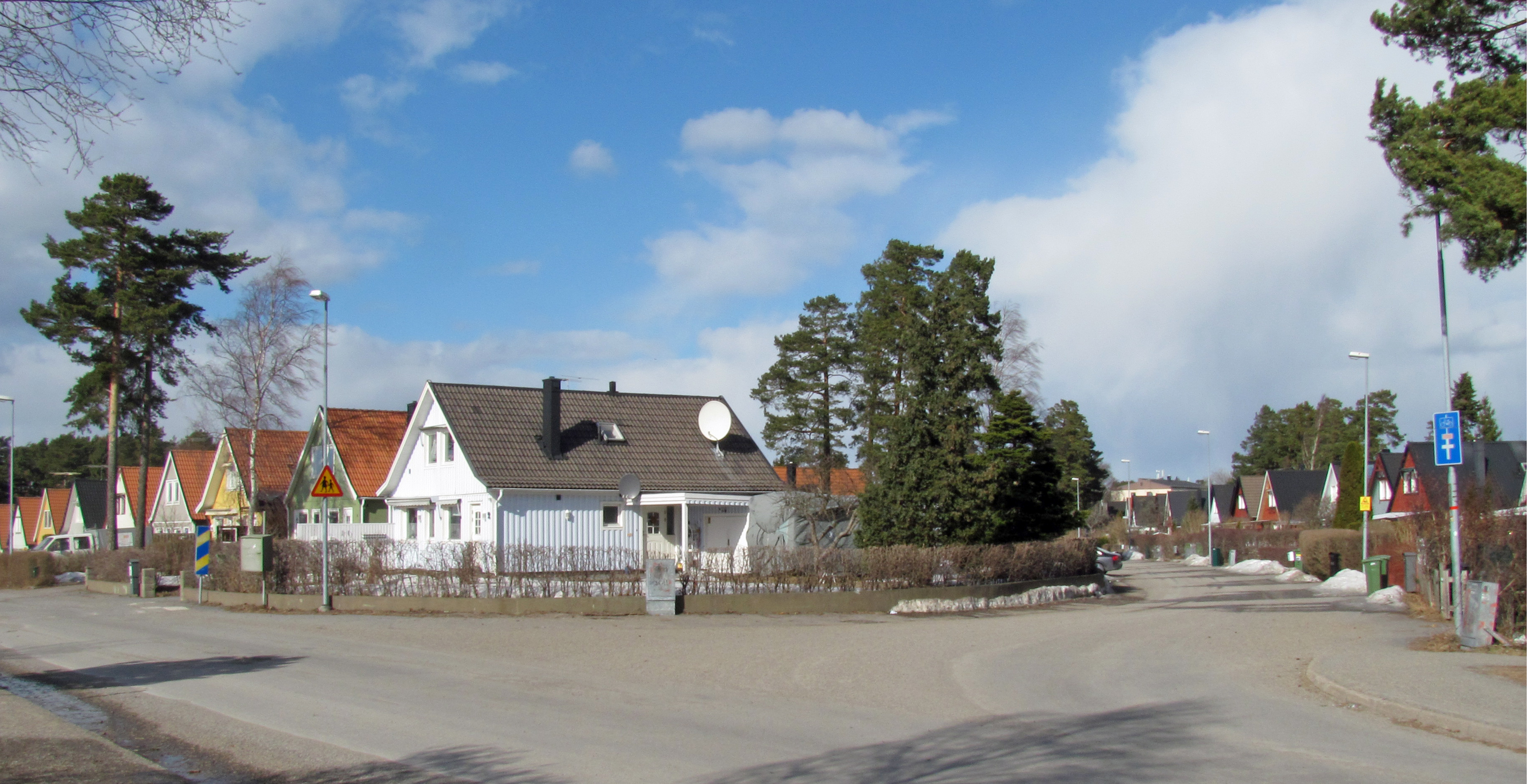
- Single family houses in Vendelsömalm

- Location within Stockholm Location within Sweden
- Coordinates: 59°10′49.73″N 18°10′49.41″E
- Country: Sweden
- Province: Södermanland
- County: Stockholm County
- Municipality: Haninge Municipality

Population (2020)
  - Total: 7,192
- Time zone: UTC+1 (CET)
  - Summer (DST): UTC+2 (CEST)

Vendelsömalm is part of Metropolitan Stockholm, located in the Haninge Municipality (kommun) in Stockholm County in eastern Sweden. As of 2020 it has a population of 7,192. Geographically, the urban area is incorporated into Stockholm urban area.

== History ==
=== Prehistory ===
Around 7000 years ago, the land in and around Vendelsömalm began to rise out of the Baltic Sea due to post-glacial rebound. Several hilltops in the areas west of Ramsjön have archeological evidence from the Mesolithic, indicating temporary seasonal settlements in the region. Several items from the Neolithic have been found in the area, like knives and scissors. Throughout the Bronze Age and early Iron Age, the regions seems to have been uninhabited. Two farms were seemingly established during the late Iron Age near Gudö and Vendelsö.

=== Vendelsö estate ===
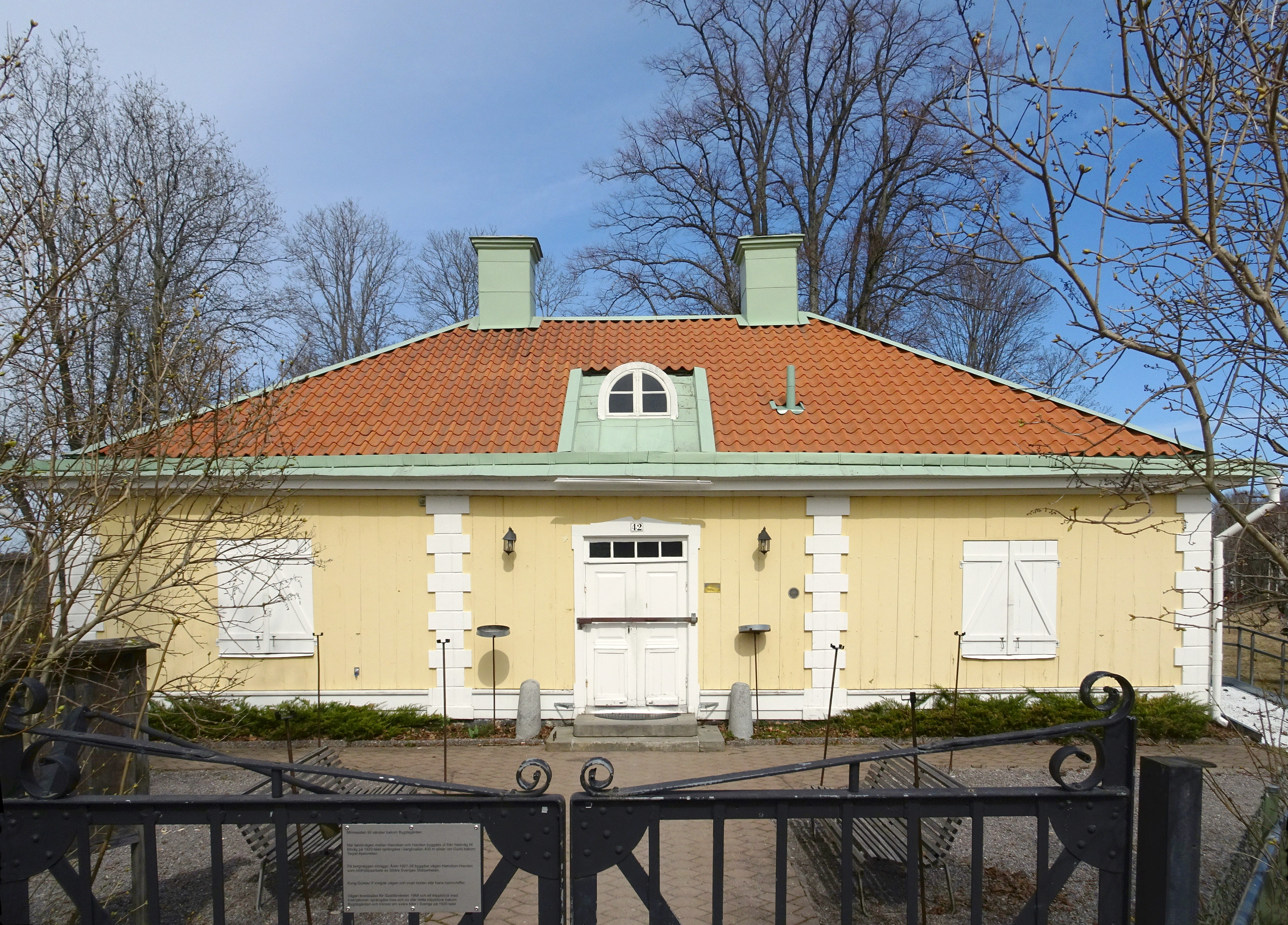
Vendelsö village hall

In 1467, the Teutonic Order sold the territory south of Drevviken—the Vendelsö estate—to Erik Axelsson Tott. The name is derived from the German Wendelsee, though the second morpheme ö (Swedish for 'island') seems to be a misinterpretation of the original See (German for 'lake'). The estate and seat farm dominated large areas of Haninge, with seven to eight subordinate farms, among them Ramsdalen in what is today Vendelsömalm. The estate was bought in 1907 by a private home association (i.e. an organisation interested in giving workers their own homes: see Private home movement). After changing hands again, it was eventually purchased by Österhaninge Municipality.

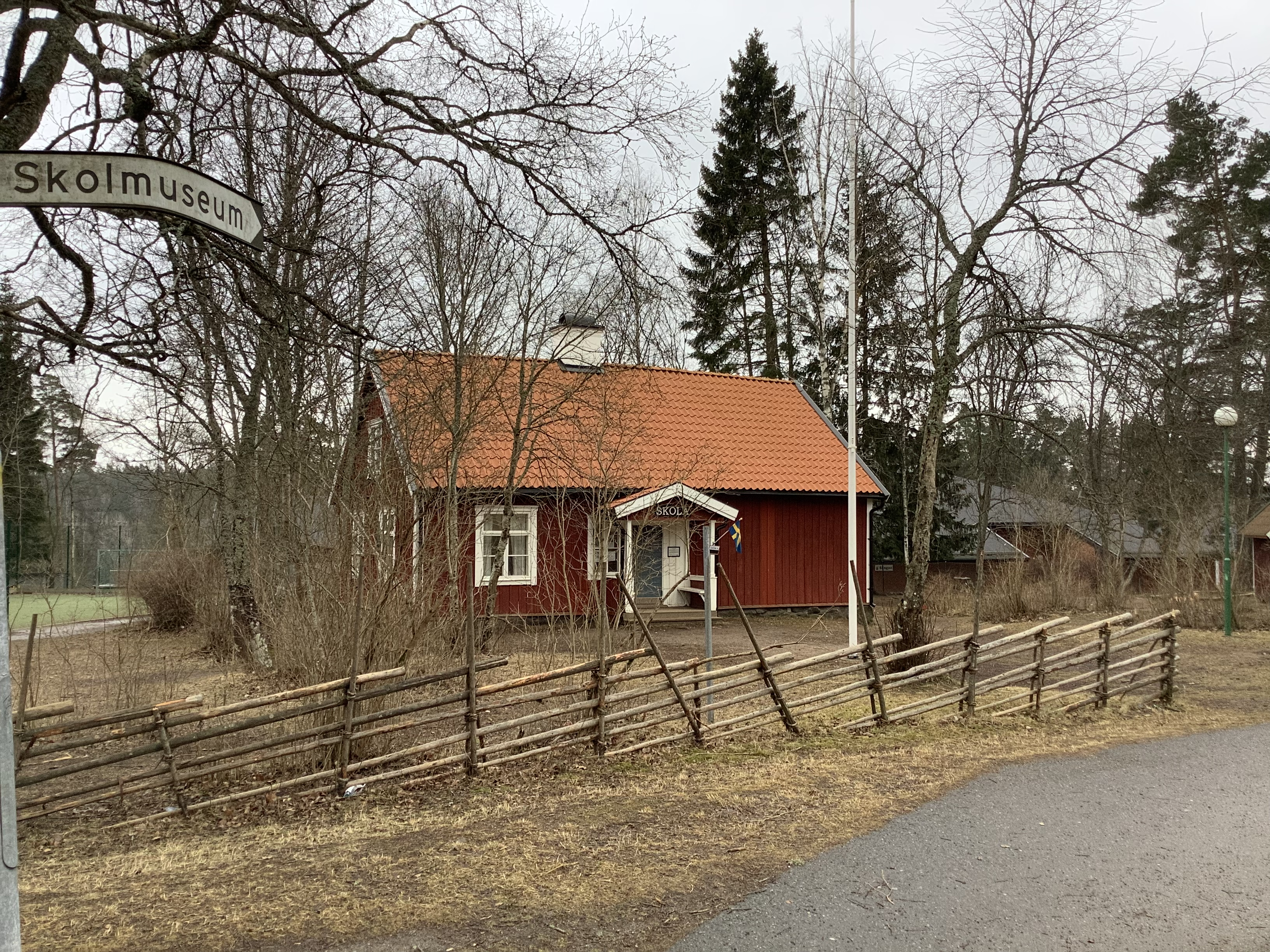
Svartbäcksskolan, a local school built during the 1840s. Currently a museum

Ramsdalen was purchased some time earlier, around 1881-85 by Johan Hultström, the foreman of the Vendelsö estate. Located some hundred meters south of Ramsdalen estate was Svarbäcksskolan, a local school built in 1842 following reforms making education compulsory in Sweden. It was the first school built in the municipality, and continued schooling until 1932. It now functions as a museum. Despite renovations in the 60s, some parts of the farm, like the drying shed, still partly carry the character of 19th century Swedish agricultural architecture.

=== Urbanisation ===
The early parcelling of the land lead to relatively early urban development in Vendelsö, due north of Vendelsömalm, compared to the rest of Haninge in the 20th century, despite lacking a railway connection. In spite of this early development, Handen became the administrative capital of the municipality in the 1930s, leading to Vendelsö falling by the wayside.

An already extant bus line going from central Stockholm to Vendelsö led to the construction of housing in the nearby Vendelsömalm in the 1950s when plots were parcelled off for development east of the road Stockholmsvägen. Similarly, due to increased migration to Stockholm in the 1960s, a section of the Ramsdalen estate was parcelled off to investors to build single family housing. Further development to create a satellite town followed due to increase in car use. Before this, the area was largely forested with discontinuous agricultural fields.

=== Resistance to refugee housing ===
In February 2016, a meeting was held at Vendelsömalm primary school for local property owners and parents, wherein they were informed of the development of modular housing to house 32 asylum seekers during the European migrant crisis. Around 500 people arrived at the school, of which less than half could fit within the premises. Among comments alleging that the municipality were trying to obfuscate that the housing development already was in progress, several bystanders also shouted death threats towards politicians and racist remarks that the refugees would rape their children and distribute illegal narcotics, among other criminal offenses. Although police were located at the scene, no arrests were made. In response, locals created groups to support inclusivity, among them Ett öppet Haninge (Swedish for 'An open Haninge'), whose mission statement is for Haninge to be "open, inclusive and solidary". In a council meeting held in December later the same year where similar issues were discussed, neo-nazi groups handed out flyers encouraging people to be "present" and to "hold politicians accountable".

In August 2020, after building of modular housing went ahead in the wider Haninge Municipality, it was reported that several neighbours blocked the construction in Vendelsömalm before being escorted away by police. After the influx of refugees slowed down over the years, the target group has been altered to youth instead. The housing has thus been seen as an unnecessary project by locals, although the construction was set to continue due to contractual obligations. After continuous damage to property and protests, the enterprise funding the development halted all construction later the same month out of concern for the safety of their employees.

== See also ==
- Municipalities of Sweden
