= Trylen =

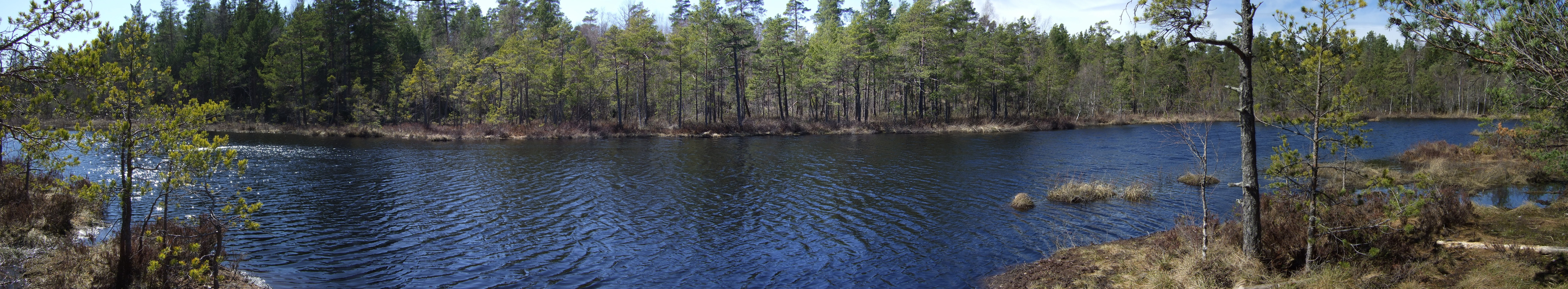
- Panorama from the eastern shore of lake Trylen

- Location within Stockholm
- Coordinates: 59°10′0″N 18°06′25″E
- Primary inflows: Local surface water
- Primary outflows: Övre Rudasjön
- Catchment area: 3.0 ha (7.4 acres)
- Basin countries: Sweden
- Surface area: 2 ha (4.9 acres)
- Max. depth: 3.7 m (12 ft)
- Surface elevation: 45 m (148 ft)
- Settlements: Huddinge

Trylen is a small lake 17 km (10 mi) south of central Stockholm, Sweden. Shared by Huddinge Municipality and Haninge Municipality, it forms part of the Tyresån Lake System.

== Catchment area ==
With its catchment area characterized by morass and pine covered rock faces, Trylen is a popular spot for walking and bathing. Motorboats are not permitted on the lake. Fishing permits do not apply in the lake.

=== Environmental influence ===
Nutrients only reaches the lake from the air, which makes water quality high.

nutrition levels
PTOT	NTOT	N/P-quota	Chlor	Sight depth	Colour	TOC	pH	Alk
10 ug/L	640 ug/L	64	5 a ug/L	0,7 m (max)	150 mg/L	20 mg/L	6,2	0,09 mekv/L

== Flora and fauna ==
An inventory in 1998 documented common reed, water horsetail, Menyanthes, yellow water-lily, white water-lily, floating-leaf pondweed, and flatleaf bladderwort. Additionally, there are red algae and mosses such as Fontinalis dalecarlica.

Birds by the lake includes mallard and common goldeneye. Toads were reported in the lake in 2004, as were dragonflies such as brown hawkers and brilliant emerald. No reports are available concerning bats, fishes, and crayfish.
