= Jordbro Grave Field =

Iron Age burial site in Stockholm County, Sweden

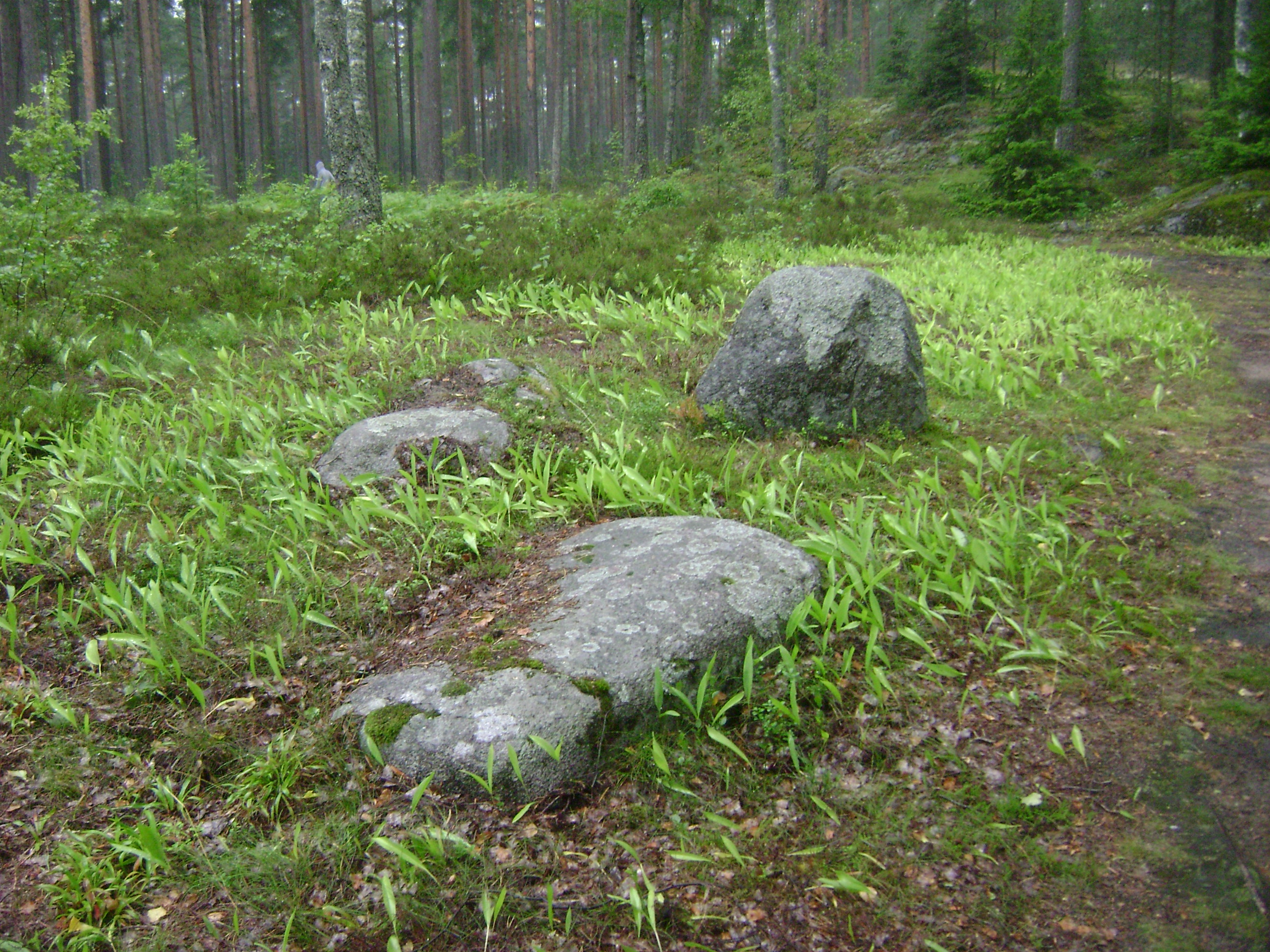
Jordbro gravfält

Jordbro Grave Field (Swedish: Jordbro gravfält) is located in Haninge kommun in the southern part of Stockholm County, Sweden. It is thought to be the largest grave field dating from the Iron Age in the Nordic countries. It is situated south of the small town of Jordbro, roughly one kilometer from Jordbro train station, or approximately one and a half kilometers north of Västerhaninge municipality station. Southeast of the grave field is Gullringskärret nature preserve.

== History ==
The grave field consists of 660 graves which are historical monuments dating from 500 BC to 500 AD. Among these are one tumulus, a pair of grave cairns, about 300 stone circles in different shapes, two stone ships, and 14 stone circles. There are also 38 rectangular stone circles, about 300 menhirs and three sunken lanes.

The grave site is roughly 500 meters long and about 300 meters wide. The Nynäs Line (Nynäsbanan) cuts through the field and splits into two parts. These parts are connected with a walking tunnel under the railroad. When Nynäsbanan was expanded to double tracks from 1993–1994, some additional excavations were done at the grave field. On the western side of the railroad, archaeologists excavated the outer layer of humus and thus made several stone circles visible. To the east of the railroad, stone circles are not as visible – many of them only hinted at through observation of the raised parts of the ground however, there are more erected menhirs, rectangular stone circles and grave cairns here in the eastern area of the grave field. A smaller excavation was also done in a sandy part of the embankment by the railroad and the northern area of the grave field east of the track. There they found traces of a small hut from the Stone Age.

The site is kept open and cared for by the local government. The government ensures that the local forest and vegetation is kept maintained. A footpath for walking or bicycling has been maintained, and tables and benches have been placed for visitors.
