= Västerhaninge =

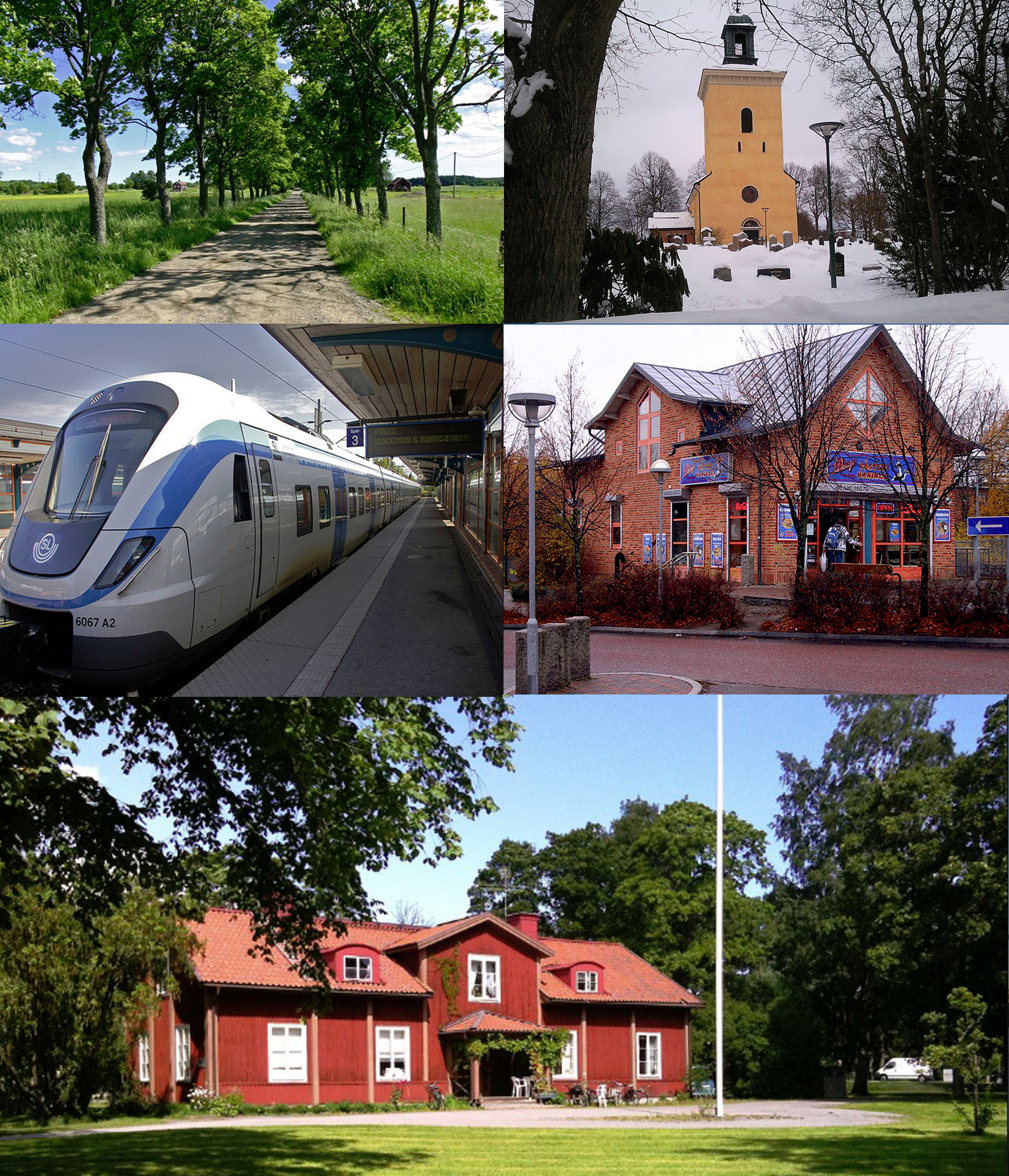
- images of Västerhaninge

- Location within Stockholm Location within Sweden Location within European Union
- Coordinates: 59°07′N 18°04′E
- Country: Sweden
- Province: Södermanland
- County: Stockholm County
- Municipality: Haninge Municipality

Area
  - Total: 9.32 km^{2} (3.60 sq mi)

Population (31 December 2020)
  - Total: 19,381
  - Density: 2,080/km^{2} (5,390/sq mi)
- Time zone: UTC+1 (CET)
  - Summer (DST): UTC+2 (CEST)

Västerhaninge (Swedish pronunciation: [vɛstɛrˈhânːɪŋɛ]) is a locality situated in Haninge Municipality, Stockholm County, Sweden. It had 15,134 inhabitants in 2010. It is connected to Stockholm by commuter rail.

Västerhaninge borders the large Hanveden forest to the north, the Jordbro locality to the east, an agricultural region to the south, and the Tungelsta area to the west. The locality lies 22 km from Stockholm and 6 km from Handen. Districts of the locality include Åbylund, Norrskogen, and Jägartorp in the north, and Ribbyberg and Nedersta in the south.

The Stockholm-Nynäs railway runs through the town, and the original station building was demolished to make way for a new one in 1997. The nearby Tungelsta station is the only one in the region to survive from the railway's original construction.

== Residential, service and future ==
Västerhaninge's several residential areas underwent expansion in the 1960s-1980s. Housing stock today includes co-operative apartments, rental apartments and villas with multiple sites and group houses, the oldest dating to the mid-1940s. Newer residential developments at Ribby ängar, Skarplöt, and Nedersta gård are planned.

Retail and food service outlets are located near to the railway station, and convenience stores serve the suburbs. Smaller commercial centres are found in Åby and Ribby.

Workplaces are both in the public sector in trade and other commercial activities. There are crafts and manufacturing of industrial Håga. A new area of work is planned at the rapids, and shall include service station, motel and restaurant service. In Västerhaninge center planned for the expanded trade volume and the fall 2010 opening Systembolaget.

In Västerhaninge are several schools of all phases and several preschools. Berga Land Management School (Berga naturbruksgymnasium) is targeting land, horse management, environmental protection and nature conservation.

Here we also find the Stockholm Sweden Temple of the Church of Jesus Christ of Latter-day Saints, which was completed in 1985.

It was the hometown of a famous musician, Dead, from the band Mayhem. & athlete Nils Engdahl.

Major streets in Västerhaninge

- Ringvägen
- Björnvägen
- Tungelstavägen
- Gamla Nynäsvägen
- Villavägen
- Solhemsvägen
- Gränsvägen
- Huggarvägen
- Plöjarvägen

== Recreation ==
In Västerhaninge are Hanveden's sports ground with playing fields, running track and ice rink. In connection with the schools are usually one or more of playing fields. The sports ground is the central track with illuminated tracks. In the north opens Hanvedens pristine forests that are of national interest in outdoor life. North of the sports ground is Nytorp meadows with several playing fields. To the east lies Blockula riding.

South of Västerhaninge is Häringe Castle, and Almås Conference.

== Nature ==
Västerhaninge is largely surrounded by nature. In those southern areas bordering the place to open agricultural landscape, whereas in the East meets the sea with Årsta havsbad and Berga as the central villages. In the northern part of Västerhaninge are Nytorp and Hanveden with ortentliga guide tracks within walking distance of the lake Öran. In the vicinity of Västerhaninge are also bathing areas and naturområderna Östnora, Gålö seaside and Årsta.

Other popular destinations are Berga and Ekeby Lodge both located just south of Västerhaninge.Berga Land Management School organizes every year an event called "Mountain Days," where there is opportunity to look at the animals and feel the farm life.

Ekeby Lodge is best known for its Midsummer celebrations.

Also nearby is the Jordbro Grave Field, believed to be the largest Iron Age grave field in the Nordic countries.

== Transportation ==
Commuter

Line 35 Nynäshamn-Bålsta passes Västerhaninge, which has a train station in connection to the center. There are four trains an hour in Stockholm, and two trains per hour towards Nynäshamn. Travel time by train to Stockholm or Nynäshamn is about 30 minutes.

The station has been in the mid and late 1990s was the subject of rehabilitation; Extended Yard, direct connection between bus and train, the platform is accessed via a pedestrian tunnel that also serves as an improved relationship between the western and eastern Västerhaninge, new station building and the side platform and partly related to pedestrian and bicycle tunnel and heated waiting areas on platforms.

Buses In connection with the station is a bus terminal with "direct connection" between train and bus. Several bus routes serving the bus terminal. The station is a commuter parking and a taxi station.

== Gallery ==
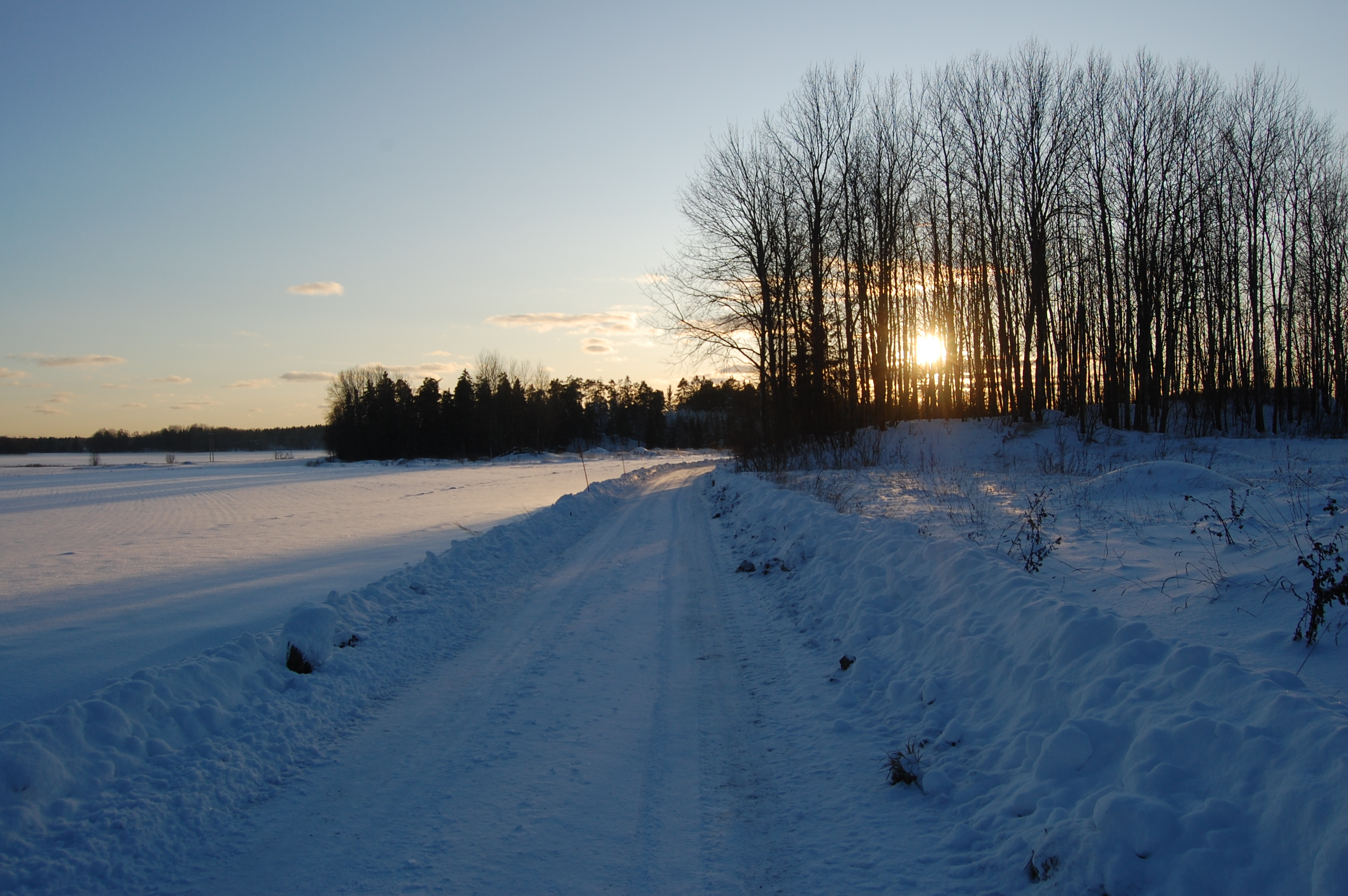
Skarplöts nature area

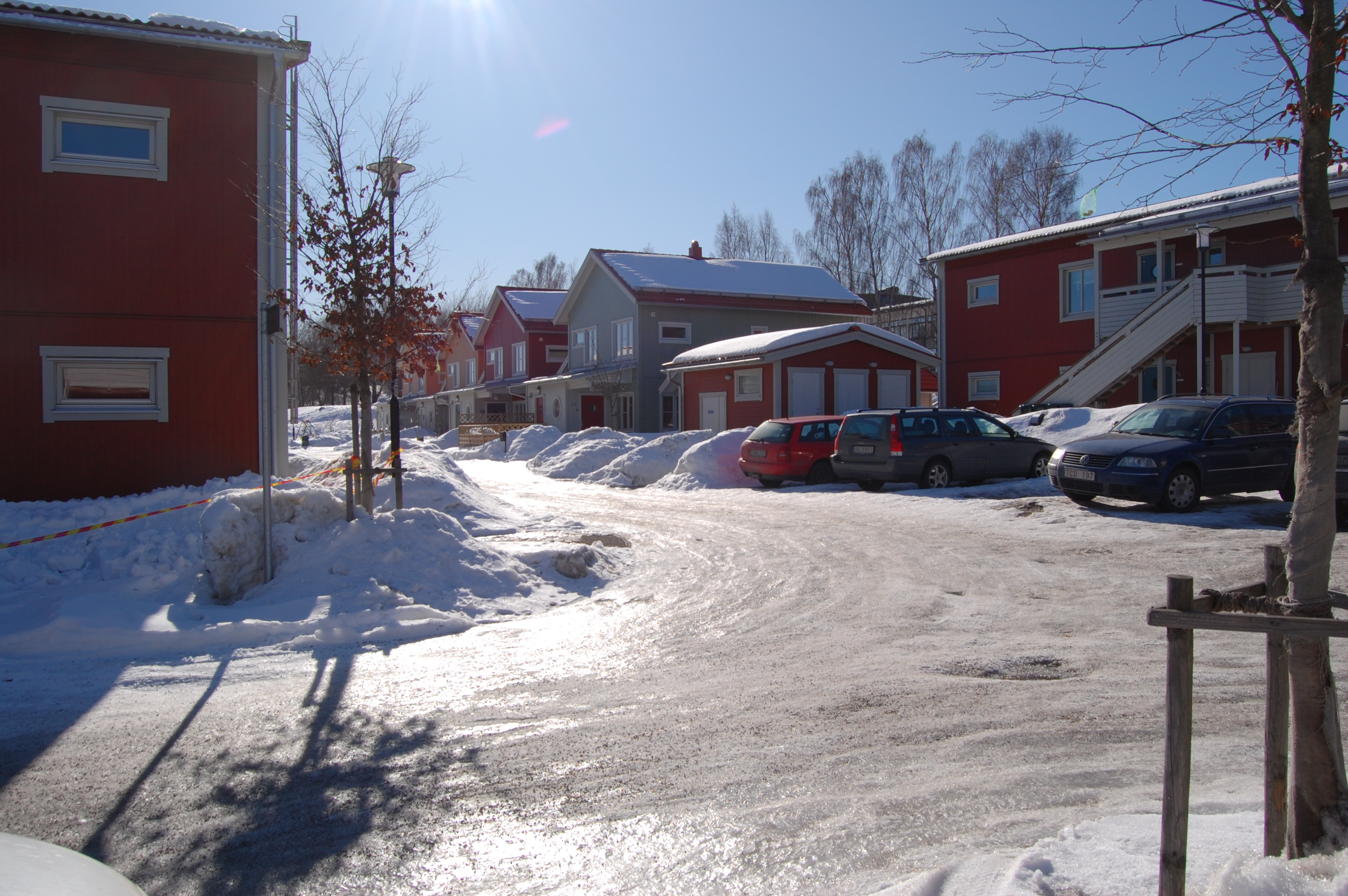
Housing estate in Västerhaninge

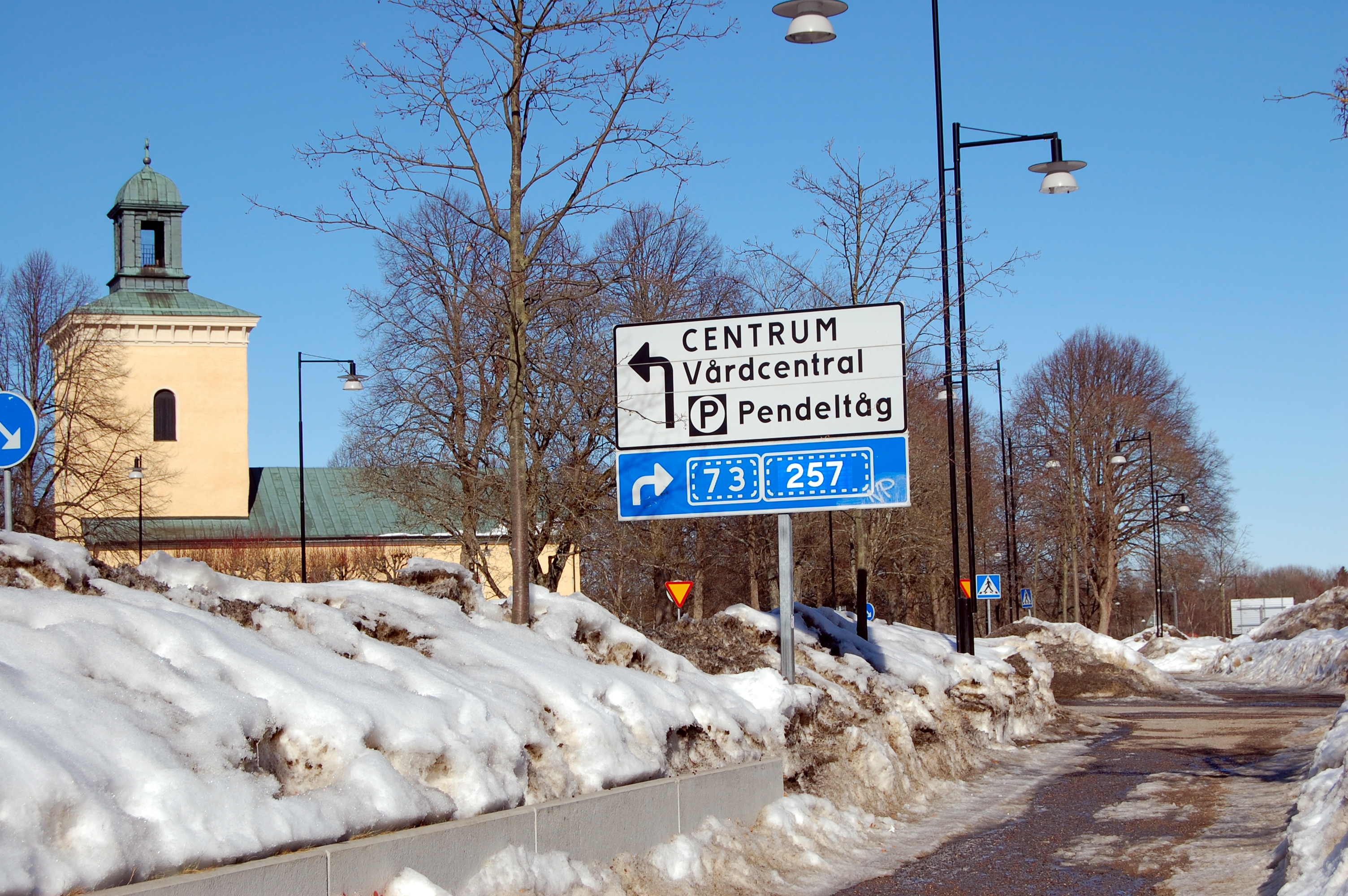
The entrance to the station Västerhaninge

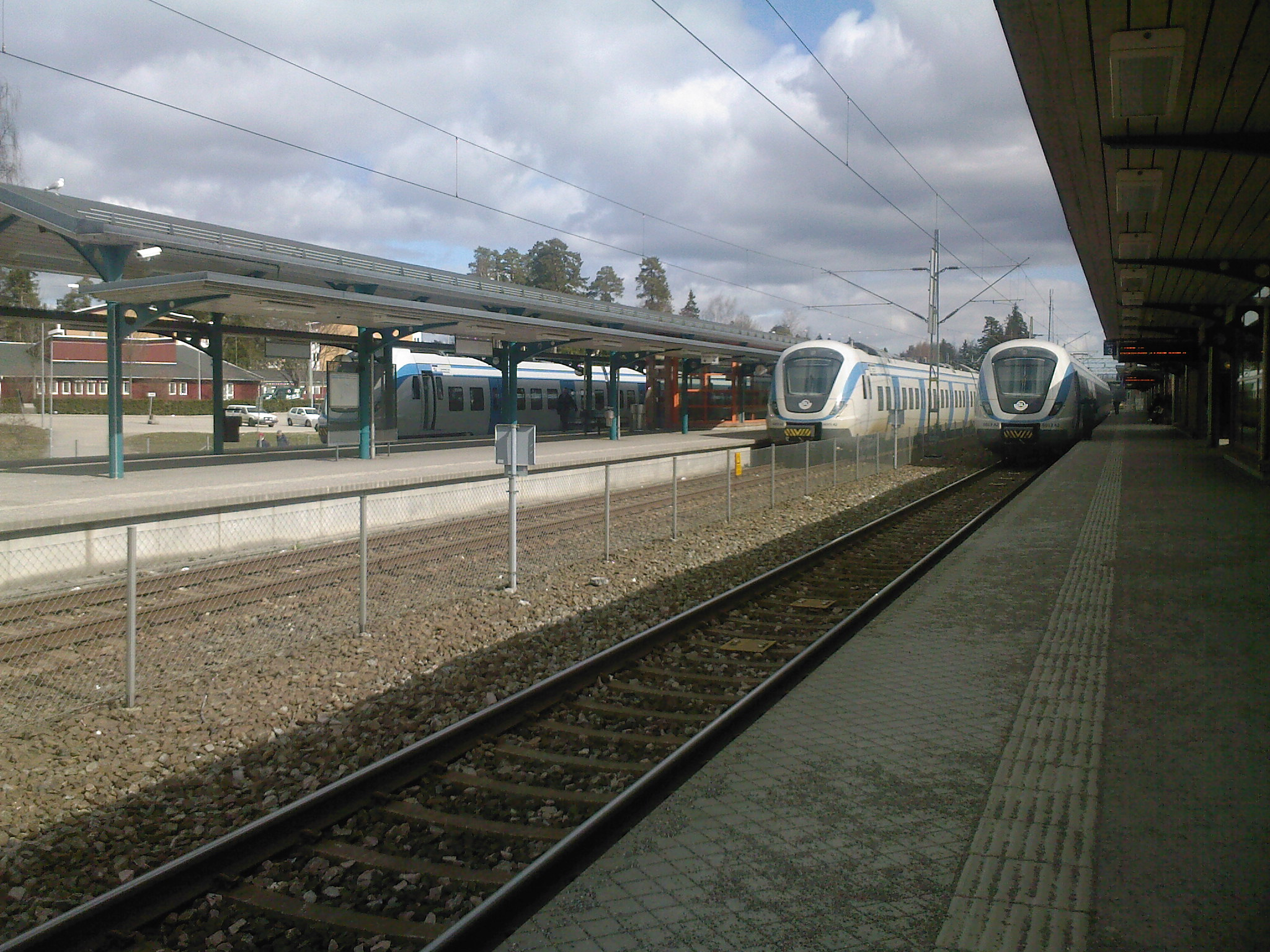
Västerhaninge station

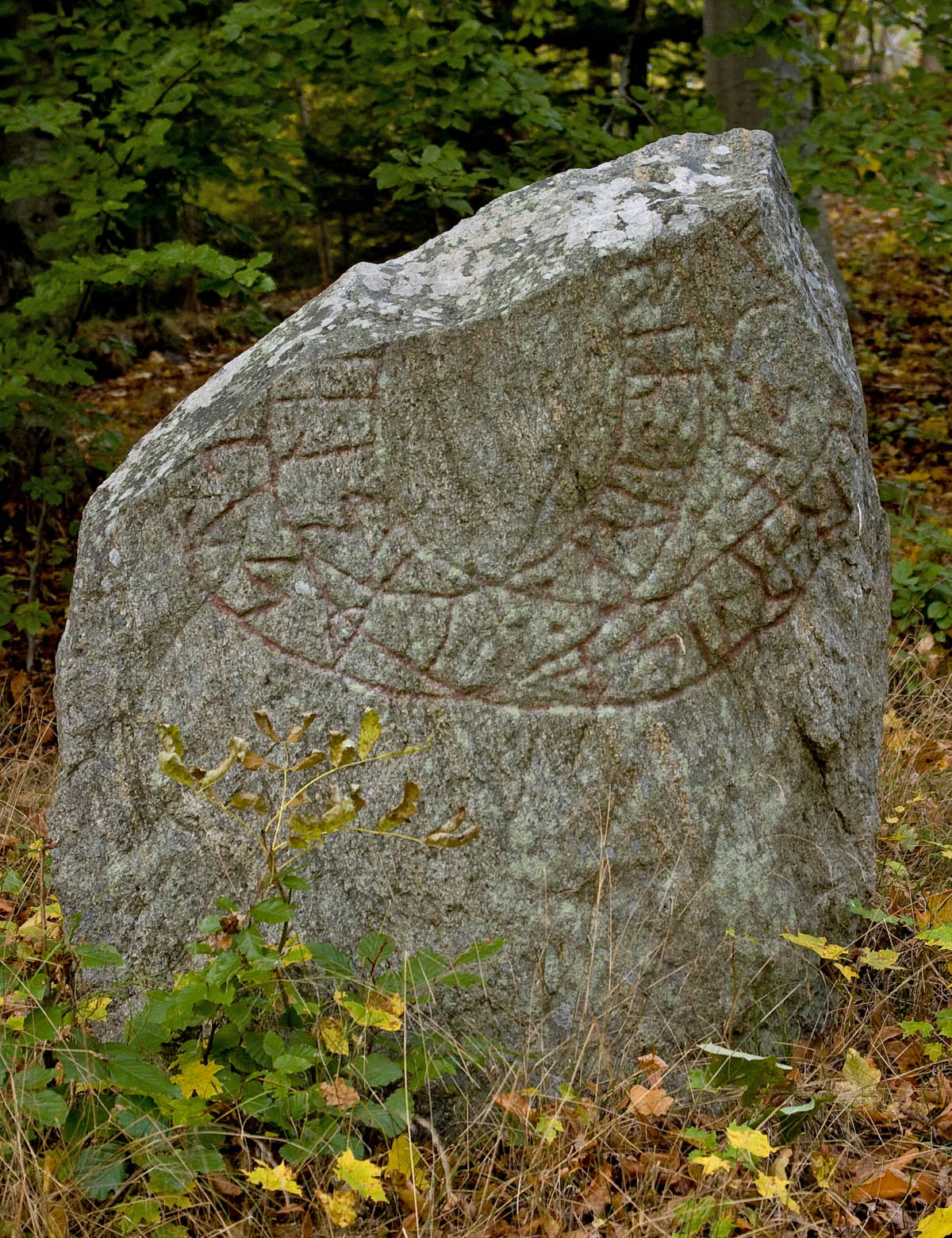
Runestone
