= Grave field =

Prehistoric cemetery or burial ground

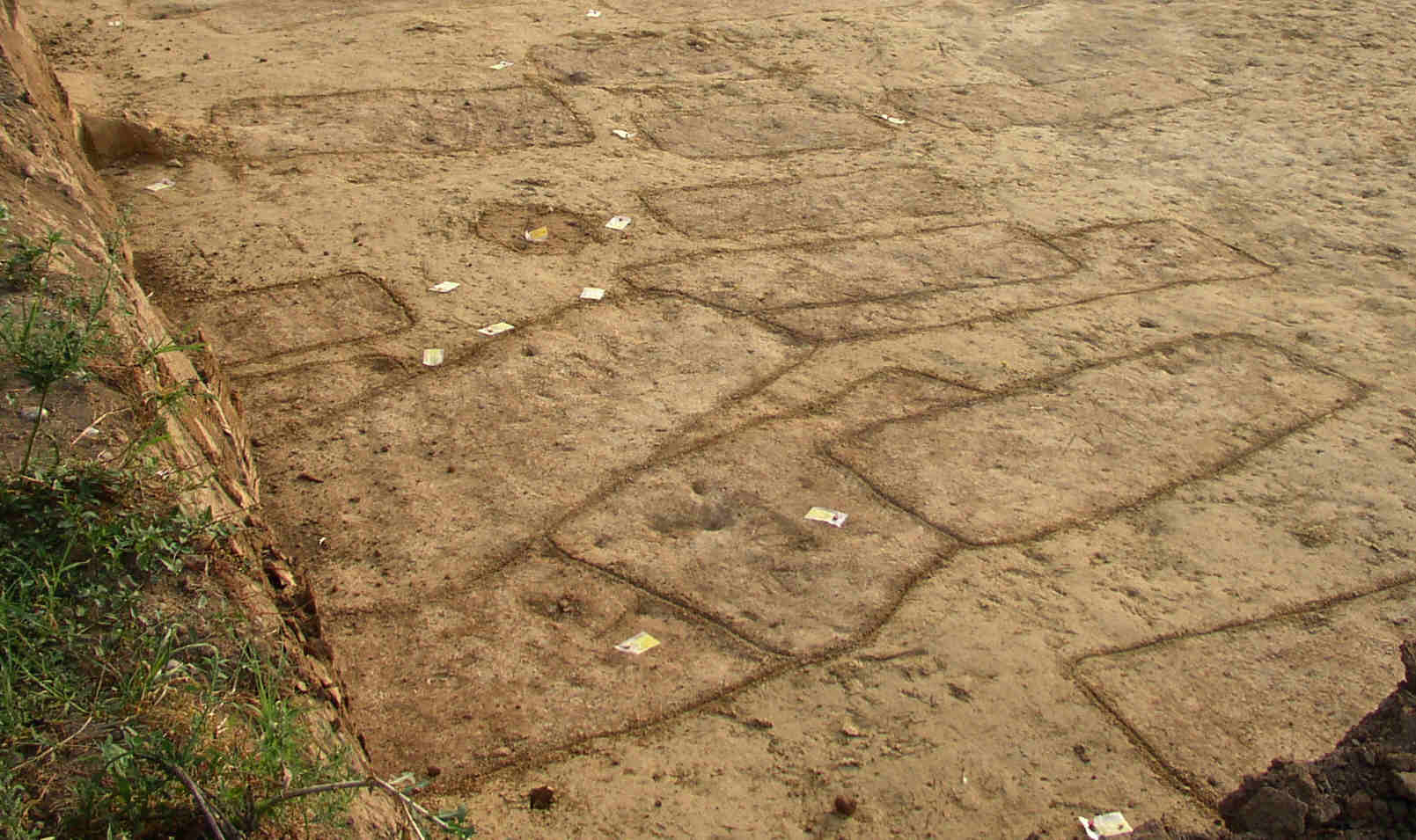
Excavation of the Alemannic grave field at Sasbach (Ortenau).

A grave field is a prehistoric cemetery, typically from Bronze Age and Iron Age Europe.

Grave fields are distinguished from necropoleis by the former's lack of remaining above-ground structures, buildings, or grave markers.

== Types ==
Grave fields can be classified by type of burial custom:

- tumulus (kurgan) fields
- flat graves
- row graves: grave fields arranged in rows
- ossuaries
- shaft tombs
- urnfields

== Celtic grave fields ==
Hallstatt culture

- Kinding-Ilbling, Eichstätt district, Germany

La Tène culture

- Münsingen-Rain, Bern, Switzerland

== Northern Europe ==
=== Scandinavia ===
Nordic Bronze Age

- Jordbro Grave Field, Jordbro, Sweden
- Sammallahdenmäki, Finland
- Ekornavallen, Falköping Municipality, Sweden
- Gettlinge, Öland, Sweden
- Itzehoe tumulus, Germany

Vendel period

- Vendel, Uppland, Sweden
- Greby, Bohuslän, Sweden
- Smålandsstenar, Gislaved Municipality, Sweden
- Trullhalsar, Gotland, Sweden
- Blomsholm, Bohuslän, Sweden
- Högom, Medelpad, Sweden
- Vätteryd, Skåne County, Sweden
- Hjortahammar, Blekinge, Sweden
- Li, Halland, Sweden
- Valsgärde, Uppsala County, Sweden

Viking Age

- Järvsta, Gävle, Sweden

=== Northern European Lowlands ===
Jastorf culture

- Mühlen Eichsen, Schwerin, Germany

== Alemannic grave fields ==
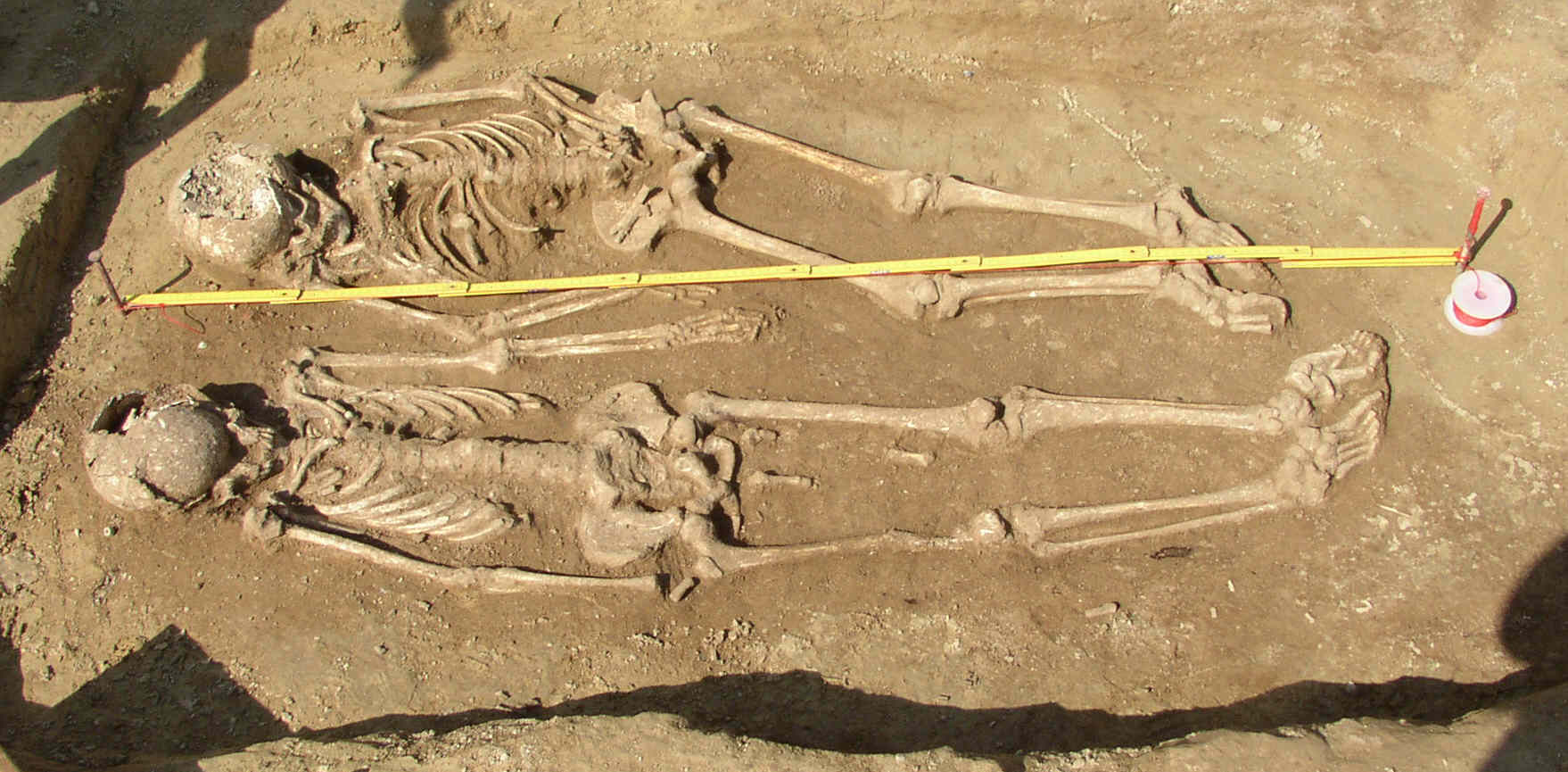
Remains of two girls buried in the same grave, 6th- to 7th-century grave in Sasbach.

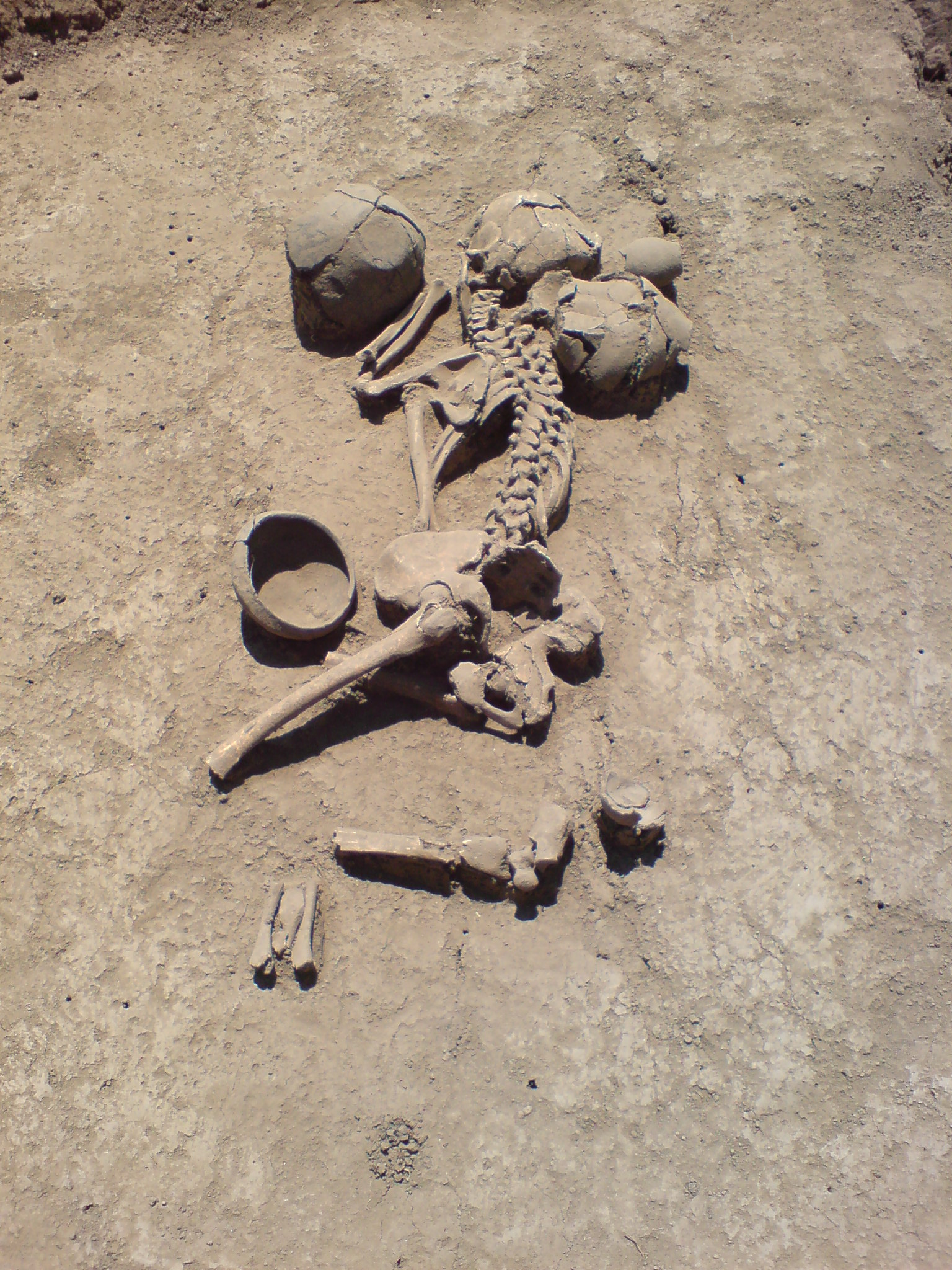
A maeotae skeleton of the burial ground near Farm of Lenin's Name, Krasnodar region, Russia 4th to 2nd century BC

Alemannic grave fields, dating from the 5th to 8th century. Before the middle of the 5th century, these grave fields were relatively small, often containing fewer than five graves, probably corresponding to a single homestead or family. The sparsity of graves in the early period may suggest partial cremation. In the mid- to late 5th century, burial customs appeared to change with the introduction of larger row-grave fields.

Grave fields are often arranged on elevated ground outside settlements. The arrangement of graves is often east to west — the head of the body placed on the western end, looking east.

Until the beginning of the 6th century, these row graves were often accompanied by more prestigious single graves including precious grave goods. Quast (1997) assumes that the 5th-century change in burial practice was due to a renewed influx of Elbe Germanic settlers (Danube Swabians displaced by Gothic migration).

Male graves from this period often include weapons — in the mid-5th century typically a Francisca axe, besides spathas and seaxes. In contrast, female graves often include jewellery, such as bracelets, earrings and fibulae.

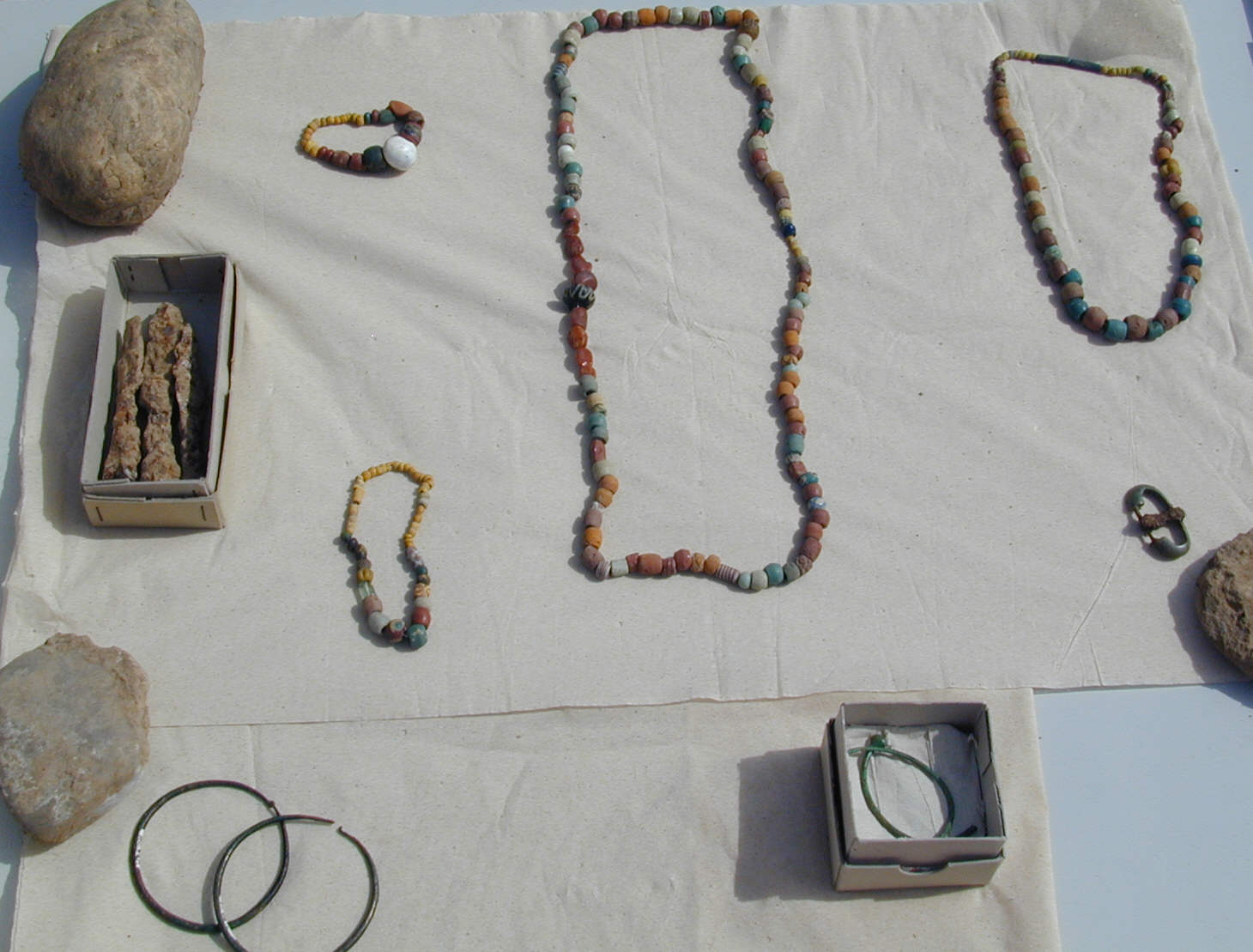
6th- to 7th-century jewellery found in the Freiburg district.

Large Alemannic row grave fields have been excavated at Lauchheim, Gammertingen, Weingarten, and Ravensburg, all in Swabia; the one in Ravensburg includes over 1,000 graves dating to between 50 and 710. The field in Sasbach includes over 2,000 graves. Mengen has over 1,000 graves.

Alemannic graves appear south of the Rhine, in the Swiss Plateau, from the 6th century. The Alemannic colonization of the Swiss plateau apparently took place in the Basel area, since the number of graves there declined simultaneously. The significant influx of Alemannic settlers to the Swiss plateau began only in the 7th century. Grave fields from this period include one at Elgg-Ettenbühl near Winterthur; with 340 graves, stands as the largest field south of the High Rhine.

Christianization of the Alemanni during the 7th century brought about the end of grave field traditions. The dead from this period were buried in graveyards near churches. Prestigious graves of local nobility appear to have resisted the Christianization of burial customs into the 8th century, possibly until the 786 decree of Charlemagne outlawing pagan burial.

== See also ==
- Burial mound
- Chariot burial
- Megalithic tomb
- Ship burial
- Viking funeral
