= Sågen, Haninge Municipality =

Coordinates: 59°11′59″N 18°11′28″E

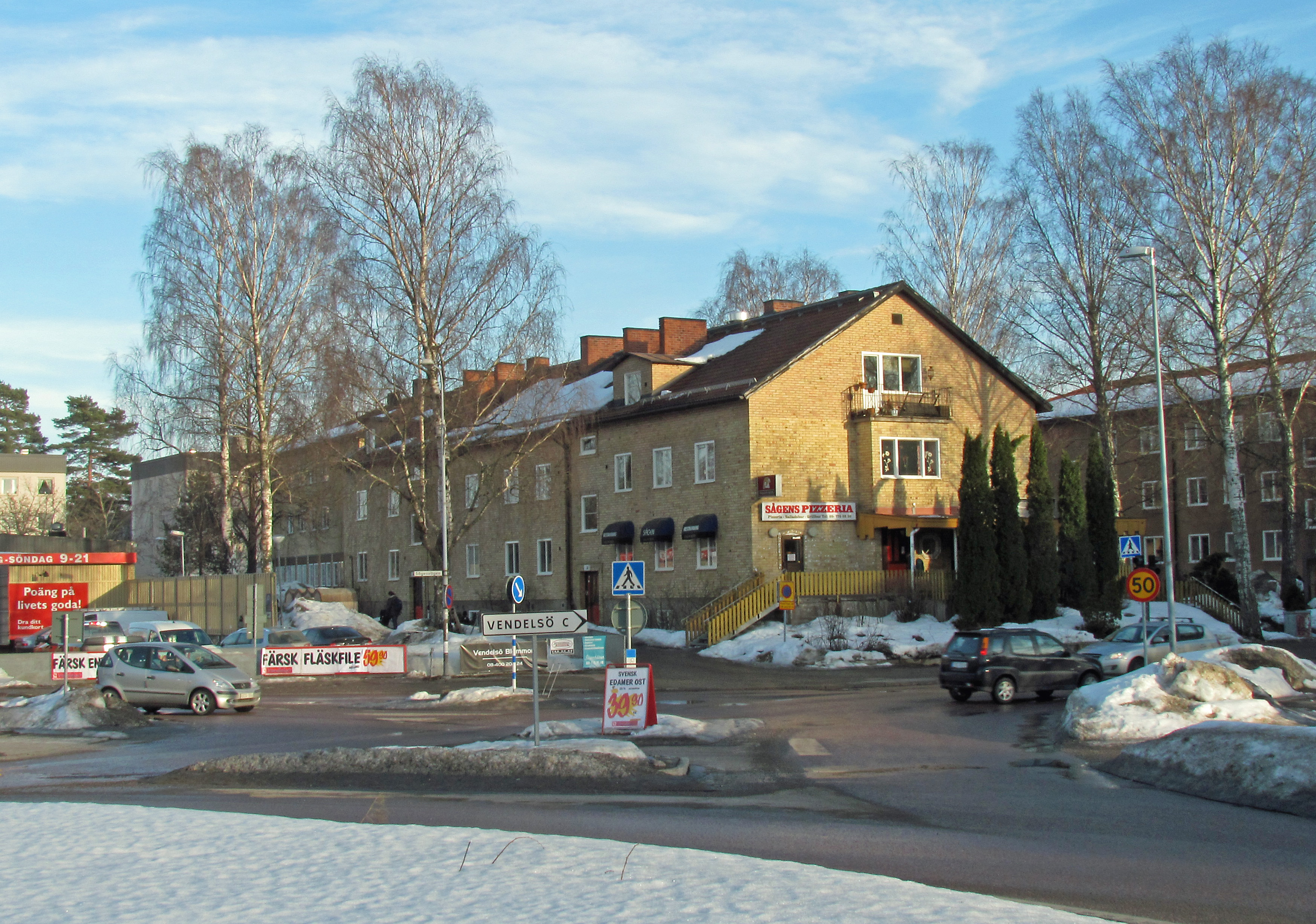

Sågen is the centre of the Vendelsö-Gudö sub-district of Haninge, Sweden. It is a community mainly consisting of 4-story buildings, built in the 1970s.

It is a child-friendly area with many playgrounds and a nearby school. The residents of Sågen are proud of their surrounding large trees and wide lawns, a feature that distinguishes Sågen from other similar communities. It is built around a square (“the Sågen Square”) with multiple shops.

Sågen is situated near nature and forests. The surrounding area offers several lakes for swimming or skating, depending on the season.
