= Björnö, Haninge =

Björnö
- Island
- Island in Sweden Björnö (Sweden)
- Coordinates: 59.112235°N 18.30525°E
- Country: Sweden
- County: Stockholm County
- Municipality: Haninge

Björnö is an island located between Gålö peninsula and the mainland in Haninge Municipality, Stockholm County, Sweden. The island was originally a part of the historical property Lännersta. Today it is mostly occupied by holiday cottages.
