= Vätteryd =

Grave field in Hässleholm, Sweden

Coordinates: 56.0164°N 13.6676°E

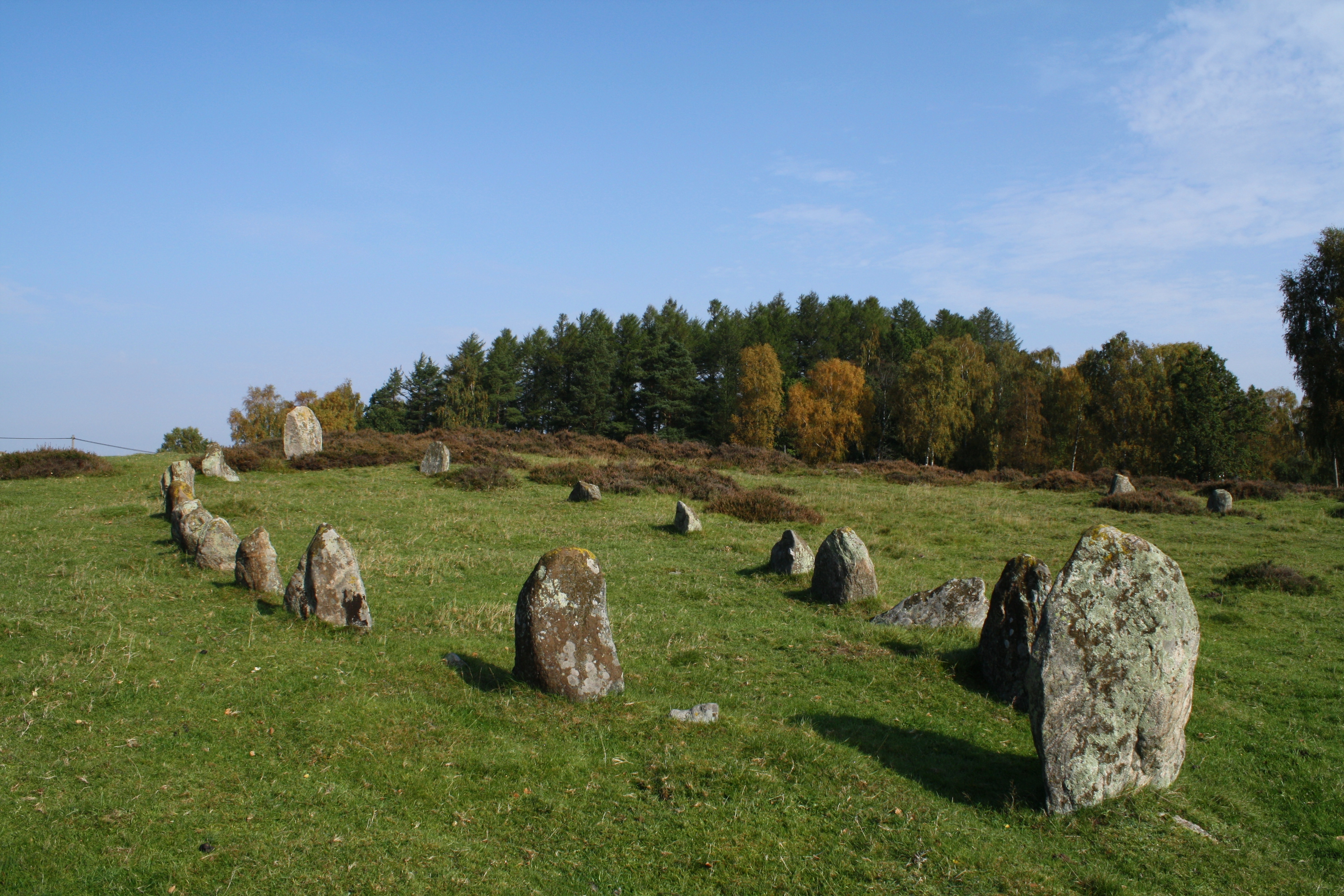
Vätteryd in Hässleholm

The Vätteryd grave field (Swedish: Vätteryds gravfält), also known as Vätterydshed, is an Iron Age grave field in Hässleholm Municipality in Scania, Sweden. The site is located in a heathfield between the localities of Tjörnarp and Sösdala. The grave field consists of 183 menhirs, 15 stone ships — the largest 25 m long and 8 m wide — and 2 stone circles. Many of the stone ships are so damaged that all that remains are parts smaller than half the original size.

Vätteryd, with about 600 menhirs, has been considered one of the largest grave fields in Scandinavia. Between 1955 and 1957, an archaeological survey was made of part of the burial ground. Research indicated the solitary stones constituted fire pits that were built between about the years 400 and 900 AD. The grave goods found — including bronze jewelry, glass and bronze pearls, and bronze wire — were taken to various museums in Stockholm.
