= Drevviken =

Lake in Stockholm, Sweden

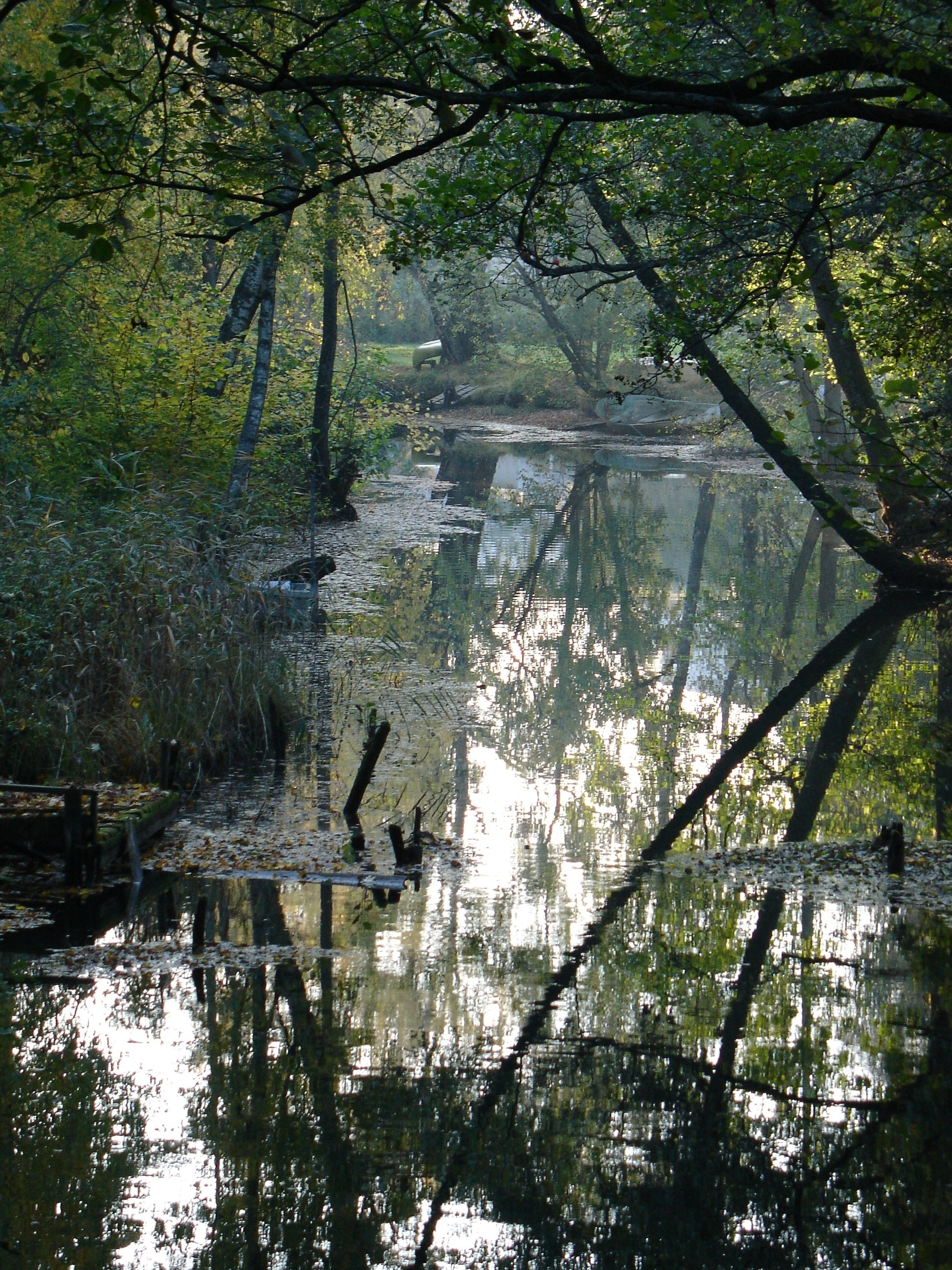
- The outlet stream Gudö Å

- Location within Stockholm
- Coordinates: 59°14′44″N 18°7′28″E
- Primary inflows: Lissmaån, Forsån, Magelungen, Orlången, Dammträsk
- Primary outflows: Gudö å, Långsjön
- Catchment area: 4,897 ha (12,100 acres)
- Basin countries: Sweden
- Surface area: 571 ha (1,410 acres)
- Average depth: 6.7 m (22 ft)
- Max. depth: 15.2 m (50 ft)
- Water volume: 37×10^{6} m^{3} (30,000 acre⋅ft)
- Residence time: 10-11 months
- Surface elevation: 19.3 m (63 ft)
- Settlements: Stockholm

Drevviken is a lake in southern Stockholm, Sweden, shared by the four municipalities Stockholm, Haninge, Huddinge, and Tyresö.

While much of the surrounding area is used for one-family houses, the lake and the green space north of it are considered to be of great recreational and natural importance and forms part of a suggested nature reserve around lake Flaten.

== Catchment area ==
Approximately two-thirds of the catchment area is occupied by settlements, mostly one-family houses. Three major industrial areas are located within the catchment area which is mostly dominated by forests with minor open grasslands. North of the lake is a deciduous forest containing herbaceous plants and rocks covered with brushwoods and lichen. Additionally, there is a fluvio-glacial deposit with a broad irrigated marsh and a scenic pine forest; and a wetland which is the remnant of a former stream.

=== Environmental influence ===
Stormwater from several suburbs empties into the lake around which are three allotment-gardens. Potentially hazardous activities in the area include a petrol station, an asphalt works, concrete industry, small scale industries, and a closed stock pile covering 9 hectares (22 acres) containing excavated material from the demolition of a major area in central Stockholm in the 1960s. Several traffic routes and a metro track passes through the catchment area.

== Flora and fauna ==
During summers phytoplankton are dominated by cyanobacteria and occasionally diatoms, most commonly Aphanizomenon cf gracile but also Pseudanabaena limnetica, Planktolyngbya sp. and various species of Anabaena, of whom only Aphanizomenon is potentially poisonous and Anabaena frequently causes algal bloom. Carapace flagellates such as Ceratium hirundinella and various dinoflagellates, are few but important to the lake's biomass. Various rotifers are common zooplankton but cyclopoid copepods can also be found. An inventory of aquatic plants in the lake in 1998 resulted in a list of some 30 species, including branched bur-reed and Nuttall's waterweed (the latter introduced in Europe during the 20th century and relatively new in Sweden.)

A list of dragonfly larvae produced in 2000 included red-eyed, variable, and blue-tailed damselflies. Sample fishing in 1997 documented a dozen species, most notably roach and zander but also northern pike, perch, eel, trout, - of which some have been introduced into the lake - and many others. The lake was struck by crayfish plague in 1950 but crayfish was reintroduced around 1970. North-east of the lake smooth newt, common frog, and common toad were documented in 1996. Noctule bats documented in the area, previously assigned the status near-threatened, are now considered least concern. Soprano pipistrelle has also been seen along the northern shore of the lake. Couples of great crested grebes and common terns are breeding by the lake together with colonies of black-headed gulls, mute swans, Canada geese, herring gulls, and lesser black-backed gulls.

== See also ==
- Geography of Stockholm
- Lakes of Sweden
