= Jordbro =

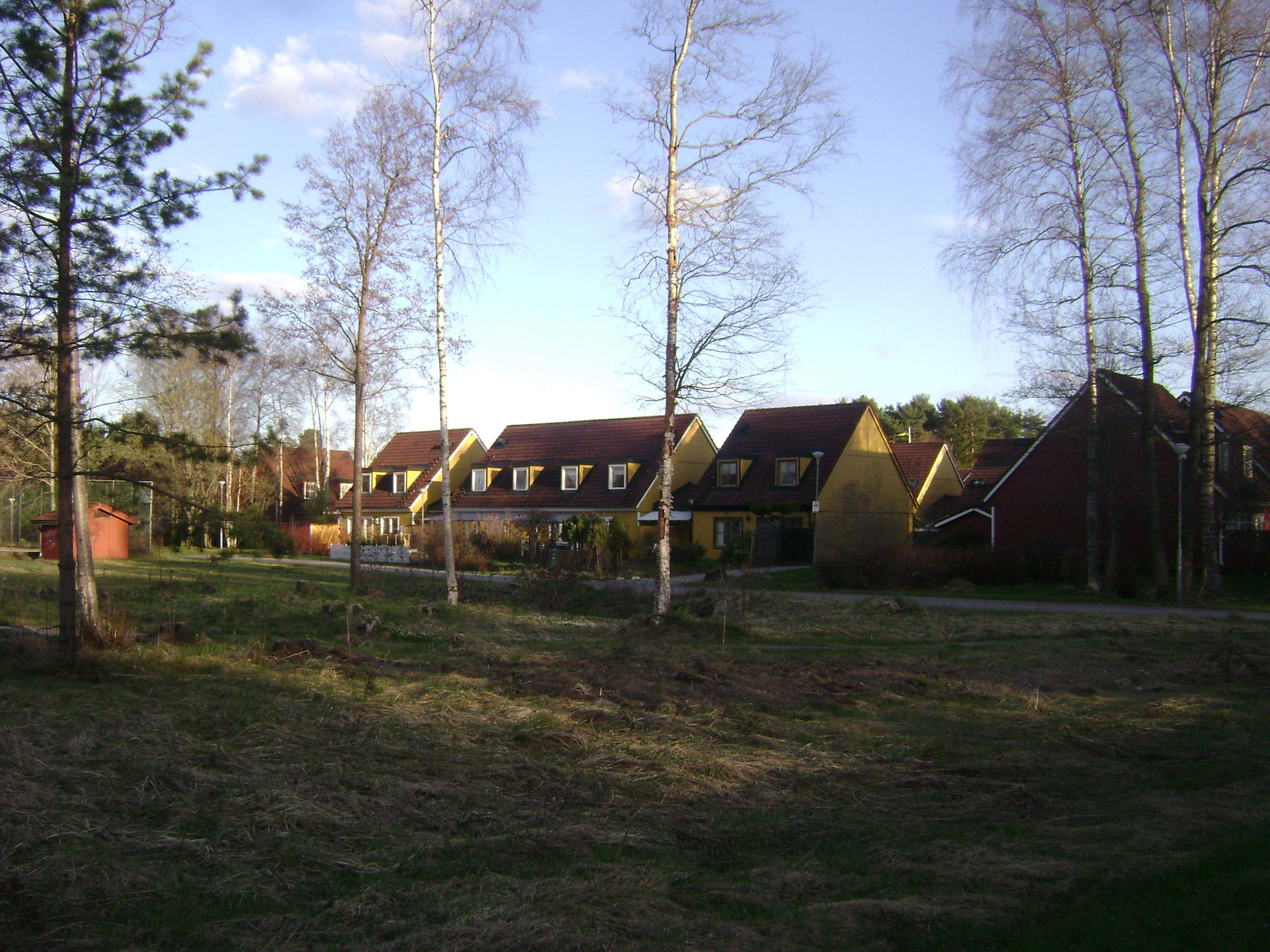
- Jordbro in May 2010

- Location within Stockholm Location within Sweden Location within European Union
- Coordinates: 59°09′N 18°08′E
- Country: Sweden
- Province: Södermanland
- County: Stockholm County
- Municipality: Haninge Municipality

Area
  - Total: 4.68 km^{2} (1.81 sq mi)

Population (31 December 2020)
  - Total: 11,607
  - Density: 2,480/km^{2} (6,420/sq mi)
- Time zone: UTC+1 (CET)
  - Summer (DST): UTC+2 (CEST)

Jordbro is a suburban locality situated in Haninge Municipality, Stockholm County, Sweden, with 10,291 inhabitants in 2010.

The suburb is separated in two parts by the Stockholm commuter rail. Route 73 (Nynäsvägen), passes just east of Jordbro and connects Stockholm and Nynäshamn.

East of the railway lies a housing area built as part of the Million Programme, in the 1960s and 1970s. The housing area is made up of blocks of flats, with single family homes to the north and to the south.

To the west of the housing area and the railway lies a relatively large industrial area, containing the main offices and production plant of The Coca-Cola Company in Sweden. Dagab, Lagena, Osram and Åhlens also have distribution warehouses in the industrial area.

Just to the south, between Jordbro and Västerhaninge is Jordbro Grave Field, a burial ground, thought to have been used somewhere between 500 BC and 500 CE.

Jordbro has three schools, Kvarnbäcksskolan, Höglundaskolan and Fredsduvan, which are lower primary schools with preschools.

Starting in 1973, filmmaker Rainer Hartleb has made a series of documentaries focusing on the lives of a number of Jordbro residents, collectively known as the Jordbro suite.

Those with a foreign background made up 40.4% in 1997, rising to 59.1% in 2008.
