= Handen =

Area in Haninge Municipality, Sweden

Coordinates: 59°10′N 18°08′E

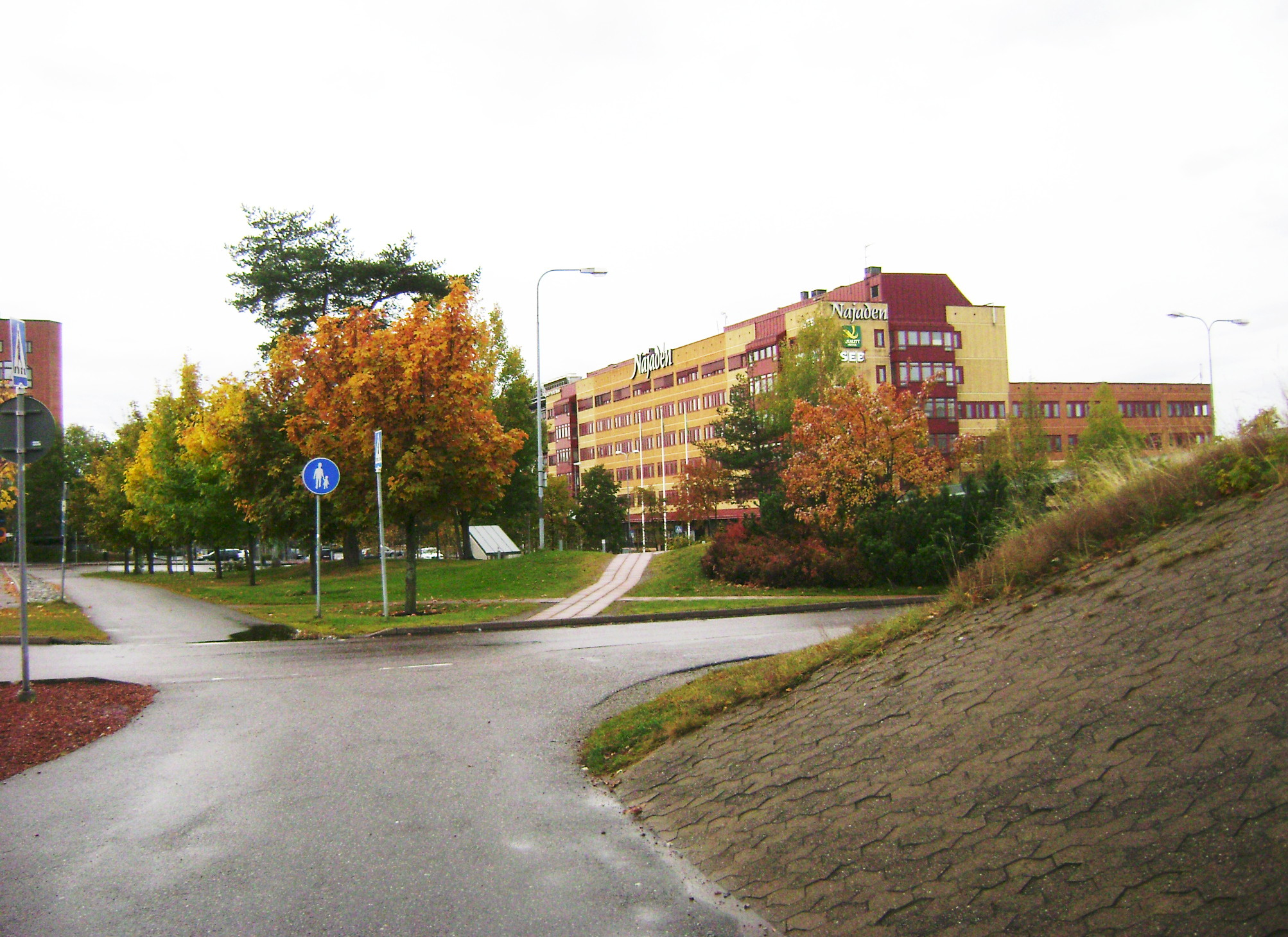
Haninge Municipality, Stockholm county, Sweden

Handen (also known as Haninge Centrum) is a part of Metropolitan Stockholm and the seat of Haninge Municipality in Stockholm County in eastern Sweden. Handen had around 15,092 inhabitants in 2018.

Geographically and statistically Handen is a part of the Stockholm urban area. Handen has a station on the Stockholm commuter rail system and a large bus station serving great areas of Södertörn.

Handen is where the municipality seat of Haninge is located. Haninge's major shopping center, Haninge Centrum, and the joint campus of KTH and Södertörn University are also located here.

The Övre Rudasjön lake is located just west of the commercial center.
