= Haninge Municipality =

Haninge Municipality Haninge kommun
- Municipality
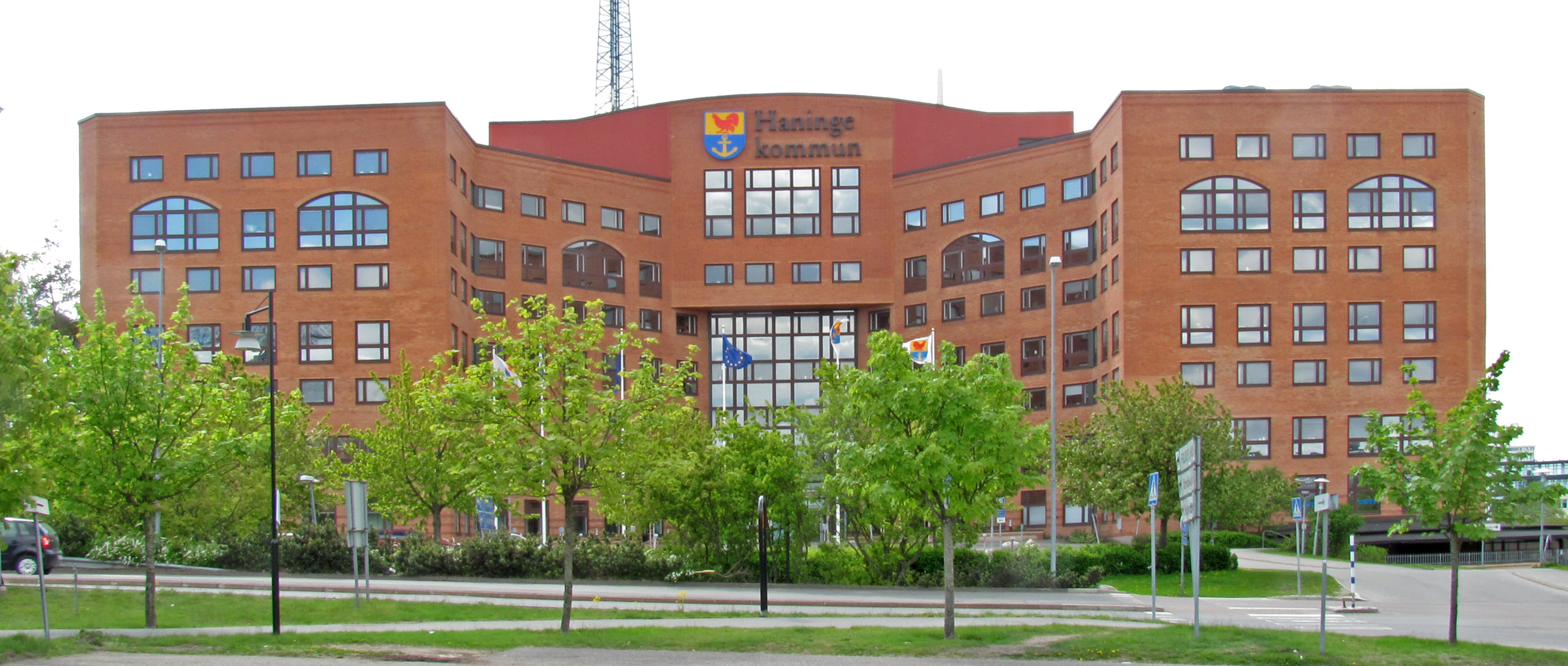
- Haninge City Hall

- Coat of arms

- Coordinates: 59°10′N 18°08′E
- Country: Sweden
- County: Stockholm County
- Seat: Handen

Area
  - Total: 2,160.87 km^{2} (834.32 sq mi)
  - Land: 458.07 km^{2} (176.86 sq mi)
  - Water: 1,702.8 km^{2} (657.5 sq mi)
- Area as of 1 January 2014.

Population (30 June 2025)
  - Total: 101,391
  - Density: 221.34/km^{2} (573.28/sq mi)
- Demonyms: Haninger; Haningan
- Time zone: UTC+1 (CET)
  - Summer (DST): UTC+2 (CEST)
- ISO 3166 code: SE
- Province: Södermanland
- Municipal code: 0136
- Website: www.haninge.se
- Density is calculated using land area only.

Haninge Municipality (Swedish: Haninge kommun) is a municipality in Stockholm County in east central Sweden. Its seat is located in Handen, a part of the Stockholm urban area.

Haninge Municipality was formed in 1971 when Västerhaninge and Österhaninge were united.

The municipal coat of arms depicts a capercaillie from which the name Haninge is believed to have been derived (the German word hahn means capercaillie), while the anchor symbolizes the naval base in the municipality. The German word usage is supposedly from the old German Hansa traders who operated in the area.

== Geography ==
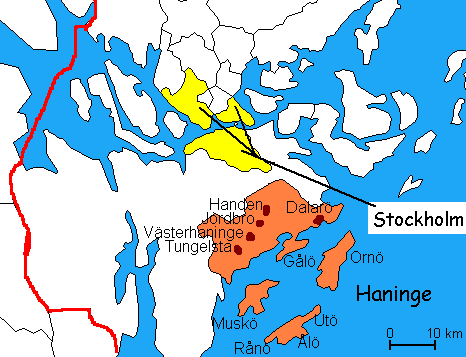
Towns in Haninge Municipality within the border of Stockholm County and the location of Stockholm Municipality.

Haninge cherishes its nature, housing the southern parts of the scenic Stockholm archipelago. There are over 3,600 islands, islets and skerries belonging to the municipality, with the three largest islands being Utö, Ornö and Muskö. A car tunnel, the third longest in Sweden, connects Muskö to the mainland. The other two of the islands are reached with passenger and car ferries. Haninge is also an area with access to Tyresta National Park with a surrounding nature reserve. It has been protected to preserve its noted natural values, e.g. one of the largest sections of untouched forest in southern Sweden.

=== Localities ===
- Dalarö
- Stockholm (part of)
- Jordbro
- Muskö
- Västerhaninge

=== Districts ===
- Brandbergen
- Dalarö
- Handen
- Jordbro
- Norrby
- Sågen
- Vega
- Vendelsö-Gudö
- Vendelsömalm
- Västerhaninge
- Tungelsta

== Demographics ==
=== Population ===
Population development in Haninge Municipality 1970–2019
Year	Population
1970	45,001
1975	50,295
1980	58,541
1985	61,166
1990	62,797
1995	65,706
2000	69,644
2005	71,837
2010	77,054
2015	83,866
2017	88,037
2019	92,095
Source: SCB - Folkmängd efter region och år.

=== 2022 by district ===
This is a demographic table based on Haninge Municipality's electoral districts in the 2022 Swedish general election sourced from SVT's election platform, in turn taken from SCB official statistics.

In total there were 95,449 residents, including 64,640 Swedish citizens of voting age. 46.2% voted for the left coalition and 51.7% for the right coalition. Indicators are in percentage points except population totals and income.

Location	Residents	Citizen adults	Left vote	Right vote	Employed	Swedish parents	Foreign heritage	Income SEK	Degree
Location			%	%					
1 Gudö	2,050	1,417	40.1	58.5	89	84	16	37,004	47
2 Vendelsö-Norrby	2,887	1,994	41.5	57.9	86	86	14	35,277	47
3 Söderby	1,946	1,376	44.2	54.4	87	80	20	31,333	37
4 Vega-Söderhagen	2,253	1,535	38.6	59.6	85	76	24	34,343	43
5 Sågen-Lyckebyn	2,166	1,542	43.8	54.3	82	76	24	28,850	38
6 Källtorp	1,865	1,393	43.5	54.9	87	85	15	31,973	39
7 Vendelsömalm N	2,124	1,554	43.9	55.1	86	79	21	30,353	37
8 Vendelsömalm-Ramsdalen	1,382	1,014	43.4	55.9	87	83	17	32,200	44
9 Svartbäcken	1,700	1,212	44.0	55.2	91	85	15	32,294	41
10 Vendelsömalm	1,568	1,169	40.1	58.7	88	75	25	28,711	33
11 Kolartorp-Hermanstorp	3,044	1,853	41.1	56.7	84	66	34	31,121	42
12 Vendelsömalm S	2,071	1,492	47.0	51.1	80	59	41	24,592	31
13 Brandbergen NÖ	2,764	1,492	57.1	39.4	71	36	64	21,245	23
14 Brandbergen SÖ	2,176	1,365	54.6	41.8	74	40	60	22,117	29
15 Vendelsö	1,544	1,047	41.2	57.7	88	87	13	37,475	50
16 Brandbergen V	1,698	978	54.0	43.2	75	32	68	22,635	35
17 Brandbergen N	1,846	966	56.5	37.6	65	28	72	18,753	22
18 Brandbergen S	1,950	1,297	51.4	44.7	80	42	58	25,095	31
19 Handen N	932	681	45.3	52.8	75	60	40	28,372	35
20 Handen C	2,272	1,787	55.2	41.9	74	57	43	22,528	30
21 Söderbymalm	1,322	944	52.7	45.1	78	53	47	24,885	35
22 Vega S	1,980	1,438	46.5	51.9	92	66	34	33,194	53
23 Poseidon	1,486	1,149	53.6	43.4	79	54	46	25,252	36
24 Kvarntorp	1,864	1,607	40.1	58.6	87	66	34	30,881	44
25 Parkvägsområdet	1,541	1,260	54.7	43.5	77	56	44	23,969	30
31 Jordbro NÖ	1,952	964	63.9	31.4	67	18	82	19,062	27
32 Jordbro V	2,248	1,216	70.0	23.8	63	18	82	16,610	22
33 Jordbro SV	2,602	1,268	63.8	30.4	67	18	82	19,020	25
34 Jordbro SÖ	2,153	1,075	65.8	30.8	66	21	79	19,479	26
37 Dalarö	2,091	1,676	33.5	65.5	80	90	10	30,398	42
40 Krogtäppan-Sommarbo	1,241	844	53.3	44.1	82	51	49	27,596	36
44 Handen S	2,613	1,716	55.4	41.2	76	48	52	24,393	36
45 Vallaområdet V	1,322	868	53.4	43.9	77	46	54	24,521	30
46 Vallaområdet Ö	2,142	1,338	49.2	46.9	77	43	57	24,320	28
47 Slätmossen	1,990	1,589	56.3	40.1	75	65	35	23,680	41
48 Jordbro N-Dåntorp	1,497	1,080	56.6	39.7	79	52	48	25,843	29
49 Hammarängen	1,732	1,246	35.1	63.7	85	82	18	30,867	30
50 Tungelsta	1,737	1,246	36.7	61.8	80	79	21	28,687	31
51 Jägartorp-Sågen	2,400	1,653	45.2	53.0	82	72	28	28,239	35
52 Skogs-Ekeby	2,041	1,418	34.9	63.7	83	76	24	30,548	31
53 Åbylund	2,421	1,562	48.2	50.2	76	58	42	23,714	27
54 Åby	2,073	1,341	46.8	50.7	73	49	51	22,524	31
55 Västerhaninge	2,847	1,964	42.5	55.5	86	80	20	30,981	42
56 Ribby-Öhaninge	1,293	942	37.1	61.2	84	72	28	29,579	37
57 Ribbyberg	2,007	1,253	42.3	55.6	84	69	31	27,006	32
58 Västerhaninge-Skärgård	1,764	1,388	40.2	58.5	81	86	14	28,096	32
59 Tungelsta-Utlida	2,523	1,833	36.1	62.3	85	81	19	29,118	29
60 Muskö	758	616	40.2	58.7	78	88	12	25,762	27
61 Västerhaninge Ö	1,571	982	46.9	51.3	82	54	46	25,234	35
Source: SVT

=== Residents with a foreign background ===
On 31 December 2017 the number of people with a foreign background (persons born outside of Sweden or with two parents born outside Sweden) was 31 107, or 35.33% of the population (88 037 on 31 December 2017). On 31 December 2002 the number of residents with a foreign background was (per the same definition) 17 323, or 24.43% of the population (70 902 on 31 December 2002). On 31 December 2017 there were 88 037 residents in Haninge, of which 23 203 people (26.36%) were born in a country other than Sweden. Divided by country in the table below – the Nordic countries, as well as the 12 most common countries of birth outside of Sweden for Swedish residents, have been included, with other countries of birth bundled together by continent by Statistics Sweden.

Country of birth
31 December 2017
1	Sweden	64,834
2	Poland	3,181
3	European Union: Other countries	2,795
4	Asia: Other countries	2,442
5	Finland	2,161
6	South America	1,892
7	Turkey	1,702
8	Africa: Other countries	1,665
9	Europe outside of the EU: other countries	1,058
10	Iraq	909
11	Iran	770
12	Syria	756
13	Yugoslavia/Yugoslavia; SFR Yugoslavia/Serbia and Montenegro	588
14	North America	504
15	Afghanistan	490
16	Thailand	480
17	Bosnia and Herzegovina	479
18	Germany	339
19	Somalia	331
20	Norway	215
21	Eritrea	164
22	Denmark	123
23	Soviet Union	75
24	Oceania	40
25	Iceland	29
26	Unknown country of birth	15

== Notability ==
The scenic Stockholm Sweden Temple was built in Västerhaninge in 1985. It is the only temple of the Church of Jesus Christ of Latter-day Saints in Sweden. This temple is also the center of the LDS church in northern Europe.

There is a comparatively large Sweden-Finn community in Haninge which is estimated to be about 5% of the population.

The International Olympiad in Informatics (IOI) was held in Haninge in 1994.

== Sports ==
The following sports clubs are located in Haninge Municipality:

- IFK Haninge/Brandbergen
- Haga Haninge Basket
- Vendelsö IK
- Haninge Anchors
- Haninge FBC

== Notable people from Haninge Municipality ==
- William Eklund (*2002), professional ice hockey player
- Kristian Huselius (*1978), professional ice hockey player
- Mattias Löw (*1970), film director and photographer
- Stefan Nystrand (*1981), freestyle swimmer
- Per Yngve Ohlin (*1969), vocalist
- Adam Pålsson (* 1988), actor
- Fredrik Reinfeldt (*1965), Prime Minister of Sweden from 17 September 2006 to 14 September 2014.
- Sarah Sjöström (*1993), freestyle swimmer
- Sara Skyttedal (*1986), Member of the European Parliament for Sweden
- Meeri Wasberg (*1973), politician

== International relations ==
The municipality is twinned with:

- Ishøj Municipality, Denmark
- Haapsalu, Estonia
- Pargas, Finland
- Formia, Italy
- Krokom Municipality, Sweden
- Gračanica, Bosnia and Herzegovina

== See also ==
- Björnö, Haninge
