= Douceline of Digne =

Douceline of Digne (c. 1215/1216 – 1274) was the founder of the Beguines of Marseille and the subject of a vita that survives today, The Life of Douceline de Digne.

== Life ==
Douceline was born shortly after the death of Mary of Oignies, in 1215 or 1216, to a wealthy family, likely in the town of Digne in Provence, in the south of France. Her father, a wealthy merchant called Bérenguier (or Bérenger), was from Digne and her mother, Hugue, was from Barjols where the family lived when Douceline was a child. When her mother died around 1230, Douceline moved to Hyères with her father, probably to be closer to her brother Hugh who was a member of the town's Franciscan monastery. Hugh was to become a well-known Franciscan theologian and preacher and was to have a significant role in assisting Douceline. A second brother died young leaving two daughters, Douceline and Marie, who later followed their aunt’s ways of life.

After a very pious childhood and teenage years which were devoted to the care of the poor and sick in her father's house, she experienced a "conversion" at the age of 20 and, several years afterwards, took vows before her brother Hugh and established her first beguine community near the Roubaud River on the edge of the town of Hyères (c. 1241). She subsequently founded a second house in the town of Hyères itself, closer to the Franciscans, whose church she and her ladies attended. Then, around 1250, she established another community on the outskirts of Marseille. Douceline lived in the Marseille house and continued as leader of the communities in both towns until her death in 1274.

She was the focus of an intense cult in Provence after her death.

== The Life of Douceline de Digne ==
La vida de la benaurada sancta Doucelina has survived in a single, unique manuscript, which is now housed in the Bibliothèque Nationale in Paris, fonds français 13503. Joseph Hyacinthe Albanès translated the work into French in 1879; an English translation was made in 2001.

The Life of Douceline de Digne introduces a 13th-century woman mystic of great significance in the study of female spirituality in the Middle Ages. The Life was probably written by Philippa de Porcellet, a member of Douceline's community in Marseille.

== Bibliography ==
- Abbé J.-H. Albanès, La Vie de sainte Douceline, fondatrice des Béguines de Marseille, composée au treizième siècle en langue provençale. Publiée pour la première fois, avec la traduction en français et une introduction critique et historique, (Marseille, Camoin, 1879)
