= Digne-les-Bains =

Prefecture and commune in Provence-Alpes-Côte d'Azur, France

Digne-les-Bains Dinha dei Banhs (Occitan)
- Prefecture and commune
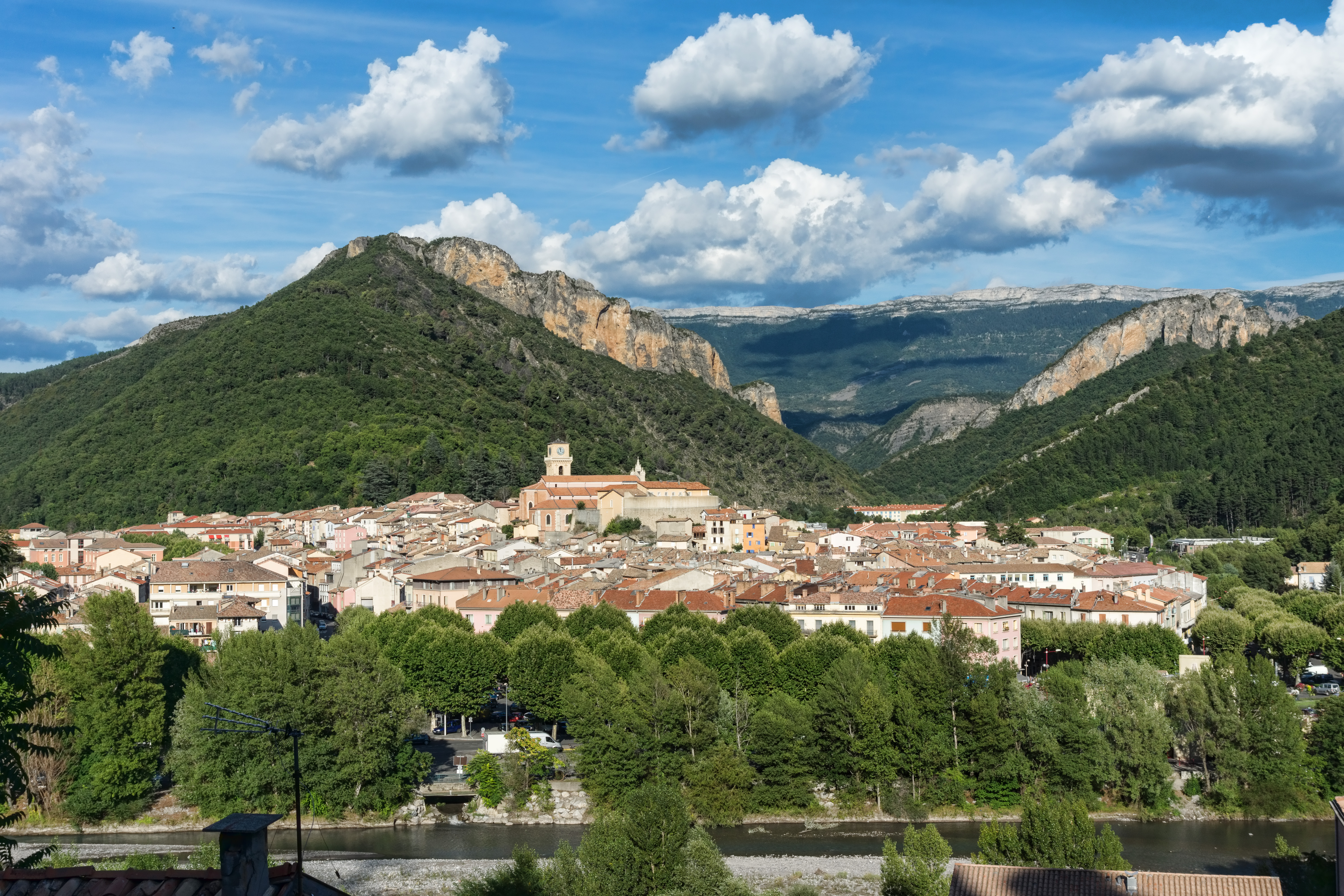
- A view of Digne-les-Bains

- Flag Coat of arms
- Location of Digne-les-Bains
- Location within France Location within Provence-Alpes-Côte d'Azur
- Coordinates: 44°05′36″N 6°14′11″E
- Country: France
- Region: Provence-Alpes-Côte d'Azur
- Department: Alpes-de-Haute-Provence
- Arrondissement: Digne-les-Bains
- Canton: Digne-les-Bains-1 and 2
- Intercommunality: Provence-Alpes Agglomération

Government
  - Mayor (2026–32): Julien Di Benedetto
- Area^{1}: 117.07 km^{2} (45.20 sq mi)
- Elevation: 608 m (1,995 ft)
- Highest elevation: 1,731 m (5,679 ft)
- Lowest elevation: 524 m (1,719 ft)
- Population (2023): 17,979
  - Density: 153.57/km^{2} (397.76/sq mi)
- Time zone: UTC+01:00 (CET)
  - Summer (DST): UTC+02:00 (CEST)
- INSEE/Postal code: 04070 /04000
- ^{1} French Land Register data, which excludes lakes, ponds, glaciers > 1 km^{2} (0.386 sq mi or 247 acres) and river estuaries.

Digne-les-Bains (French pronunciation: [diɲ le bɛ̃]; Occitan: Dinha dei Banhs), or simply and historically Digne (Dinha in the classical norm or Digno in the Mistralian norm), is the prefecture of the Alpes-de-Haute-Provence department in the Provence-Alpes-Côte d'Azur region of southern France. Its inhabitants are called Dignois (masculine) and Dignoises (feminine).

== Geography ==
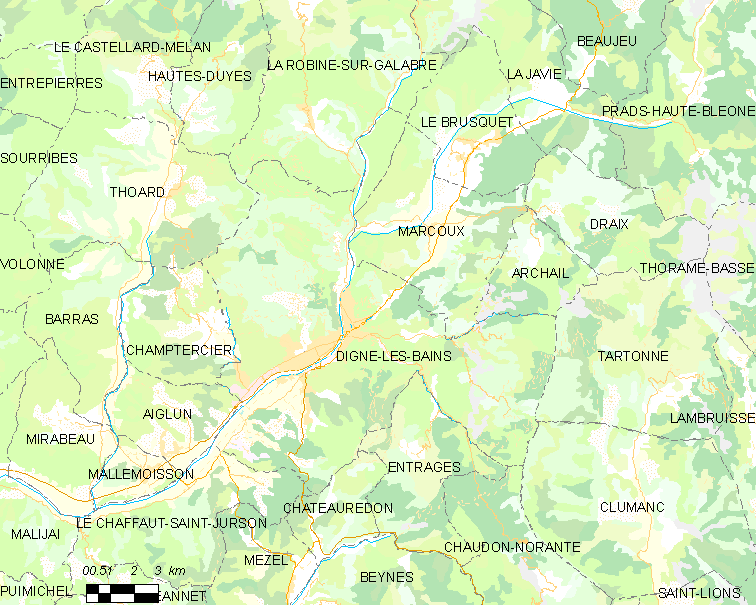
Digne-les-Bains and neighboring municipalities

=== Site and location ===
Located on the edge of the Digne Prealps and on both sides of the river Bléone, which flows southwest through the middle of the commune and crosses the town; it forms part of the commune's northeastern and southwestern borders.

Digne-les-Bains is the capital of the Department of Alpes de Haute-Provence. Placed in the geographical centre of the Department, the commune is home to 17,400 inhabitants, making it one of the smaller prefectures of France by its population. The town centre is at 608 metres (1,995 ft) altitude.

Digne is a sprawling commune in the plain formed around the Bléone Valley, given that the terrain that surrounds it is very rugged. The old town is built on a hill between the Bléone and the torrent of the hot springs, but the town has gradually extended in the three directions of the valleys, especially downstream. Its geographical location is quite remarkable, given that it lies at the edge of the Prealps, on a thrust fault that bears its name. A part of the town is completely enclosed in the Bléone Valley, while the town extends widely, on a gentler relief, downstream. With the annexation of neighbouring towns, especially downstream, the town extends over 8 kilometres (5.0 mi) in length.

Panoramic views of Dignes-les-Bains

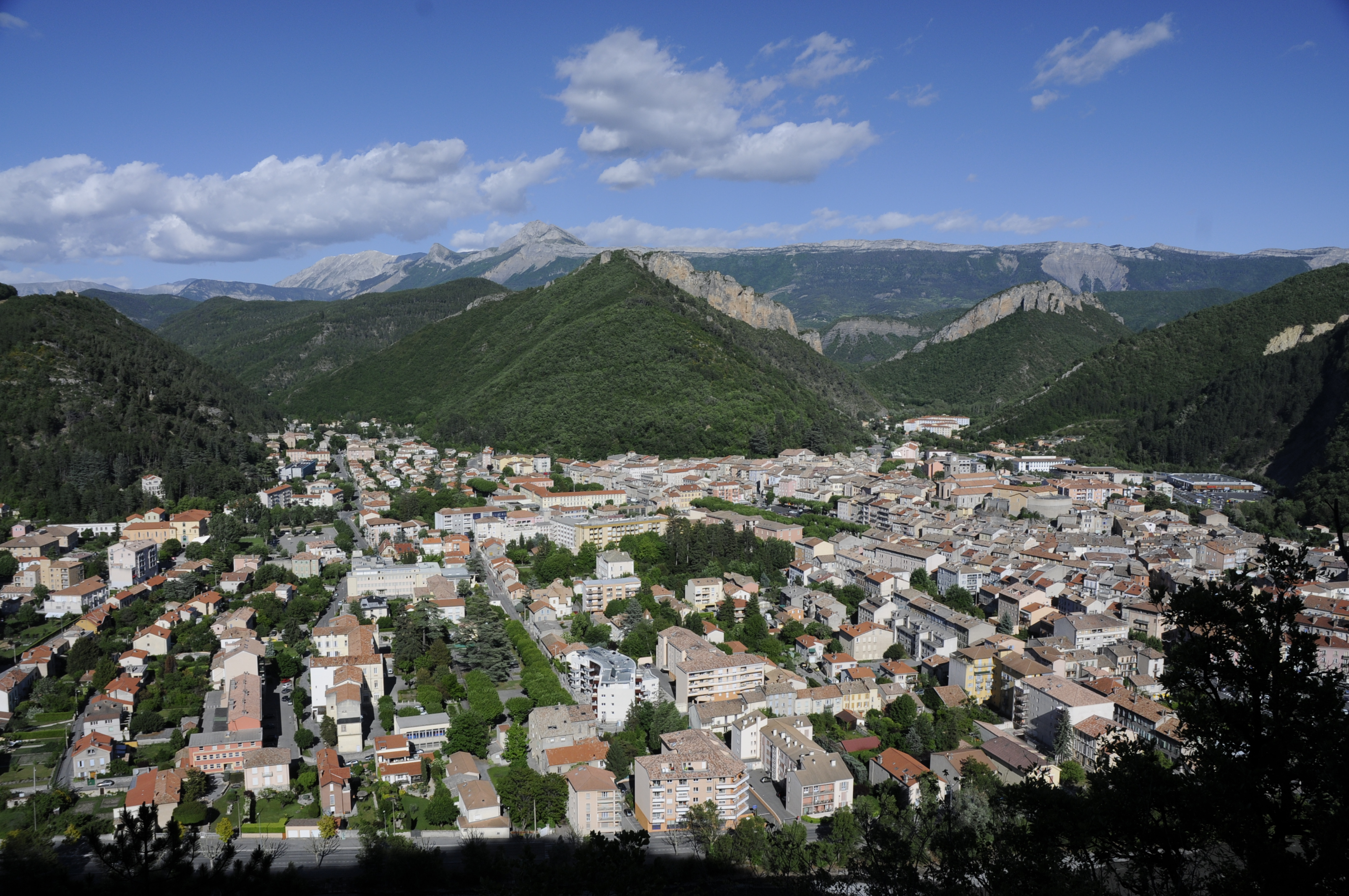
General view of the city from west to east

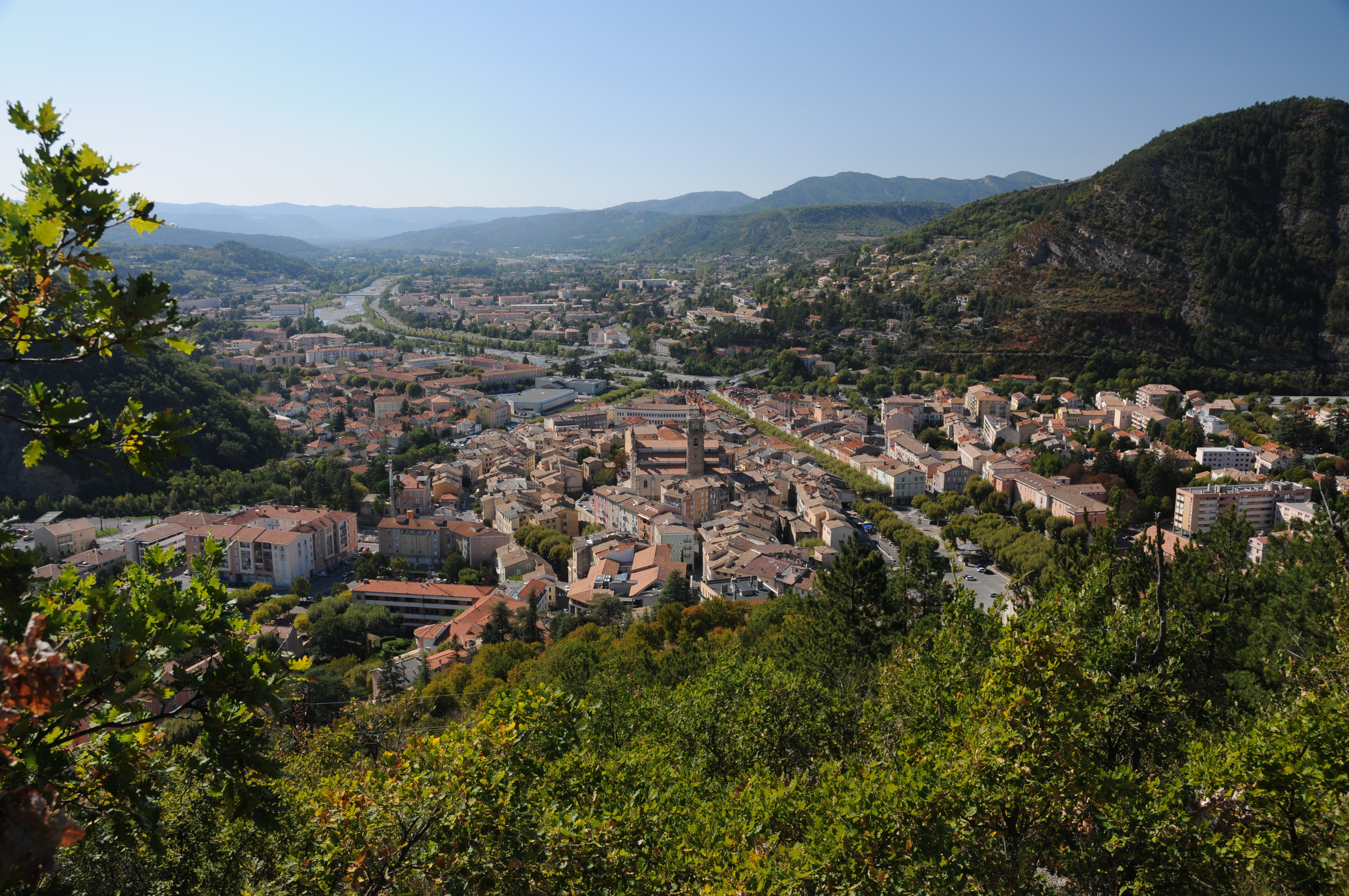
The old centre from east to west

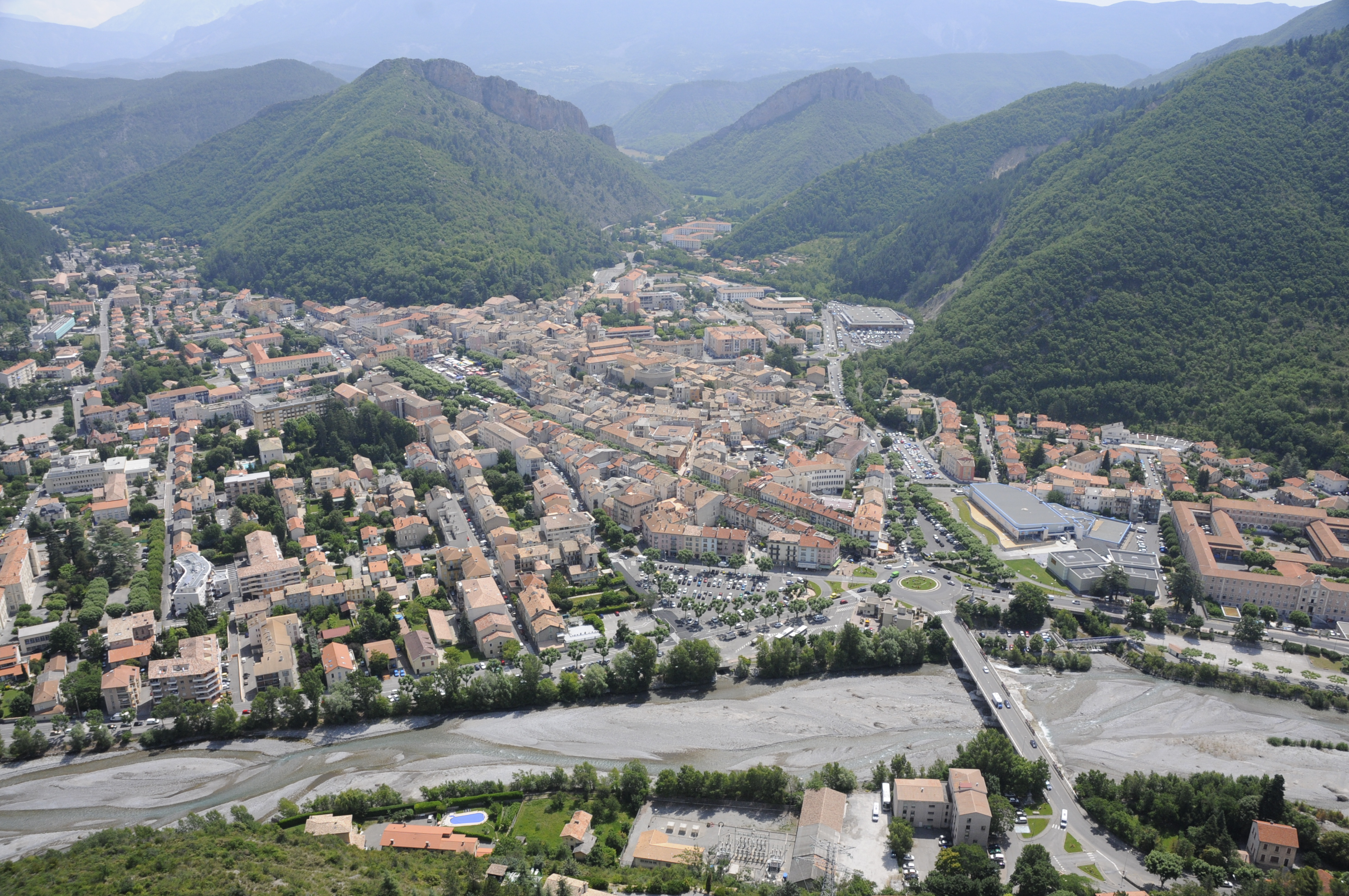
An aerial view of the centre from west to east

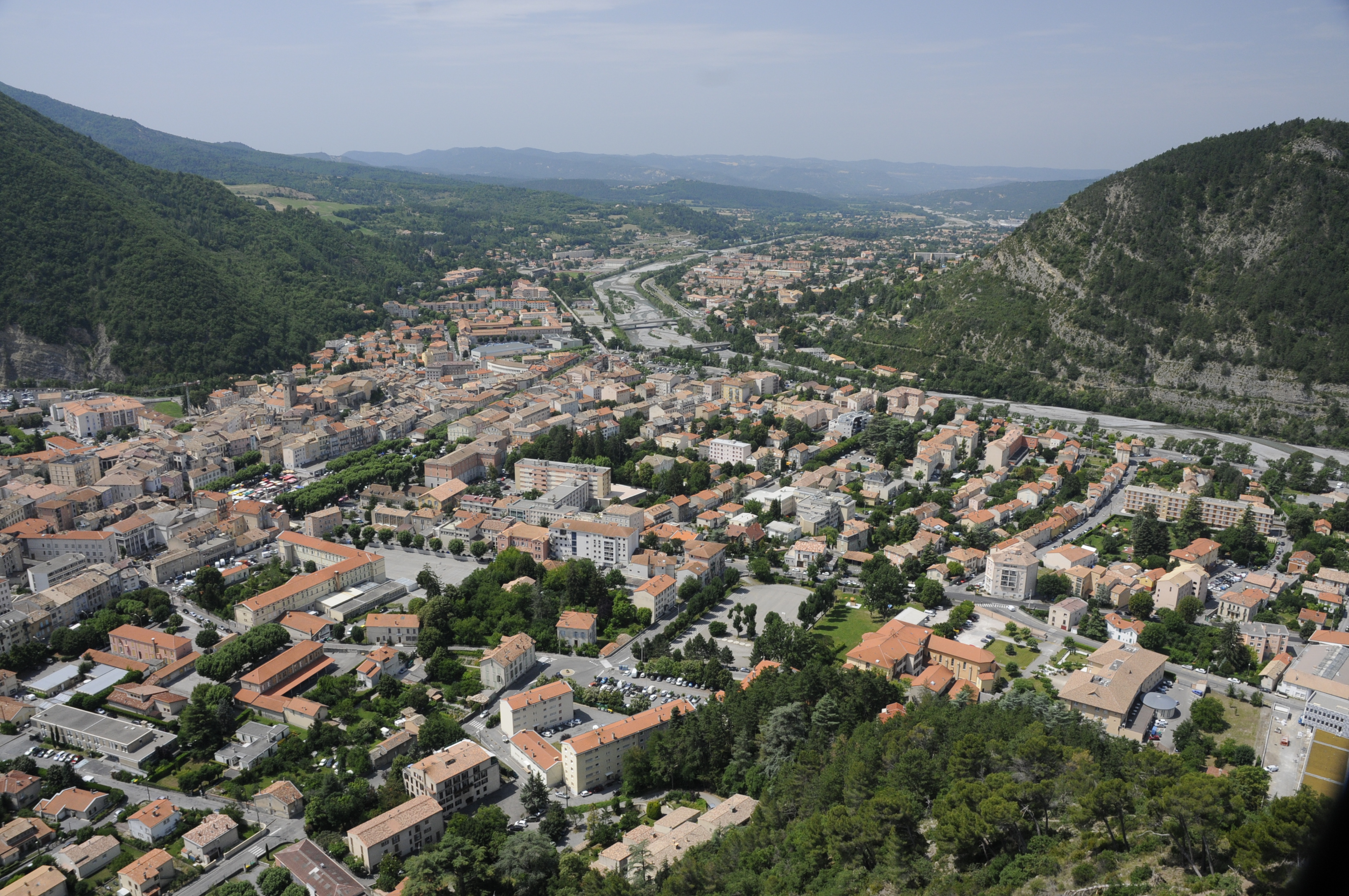
An aerial view of the centre from the east, towards the direction of the Durance river

=== Neighbouring communes ===
The communes surrounding Digne-les-Bains are La Robine-sur-Galabre, Le Brusquet, Marcoux, Archail, Tartonne, Clumanc, Chaudon-Norante, Châteauredon, Le Chaffaut-Saint-Jurson, Aiglun, Champtercier and Thoard.

=== Climate ===
Digne-les-Bains features a mid-latitude humid subtropical climate (Köppen climate classification: Cfa), with mediterranean (Csa) and oceanic (Cfb) influences. Summers are hot and relatively dry, and winters are mildly cold and relatively wet, with air frosts being regular in the winter months.

Climate data for Digne-les-Bains, elevation 554 m (1,818 ft), (2003–2020 normals, extremes 2003–present)
Month	Jan	Feb	Mar	Apr	May	Jun	Jul	Aug	Sep	Oct	Nov	Dec	Year
Record high °C (°F)	22.0 (71.6)	24.5 (76.1)	25.6 (78.1)	28.3 (82.9)	34.3 (93.7)	42.1 (107.8)	36.9 (98.4)	39.0 (102.2)	33.9 (93.0)	31.0 (87.8)	24.8 (76.6)	19.9 (67.8)	42.1 (107.8)
Mean daily maximum °C (°F)	9.9 (49.8)	11.5 (52.7)	15.2 (59.4)	18.8 (65.8)	22.5 (72.5)	27.2 (81.0)	30.4 (86.7)	30.0 (86.0)	25.3 (77.5)	20.1 (68.2)	14.2 (57.6)	10.2 (50.4)	19.6 (67.3)
Daily mean °C (°F)	3.6 (38.5)	4.4 (39.9)	7.8 (46.0)	11.3 (52.3)	14.8 (58.6)	19.3 (66.7)	21.8 (71.2)	21.4 (70.5)	17.4 (63.3)	13.0 (55.4)	7.9 (46.2)	4.0 (39.2)	12.2 (54.0)
Mean daily minimum °C (°F)	−2.8 (27.0)	−2.7 (27.1)	0.3 (32.5)	3.8 (38.8)	7.1 (44.8)	11.3 (52.3)	13.2 (55.8)	12.7 (54.9)	9.6 (49.3)	6.0 (42.8)	1.5 (34.7)	−2.1 (28.2)	4.8 (40.6)
Record low °C (°F)	−13.0 (8.6)	−17.8 (0.0)	−11.4 (11.5)	−7.0 (19.4)	−2.0 (28.4)	0.2 (32.4)	6.1 (43.0)	2.8 (37.0)	−1.6 (29.1)	−5.4 (22.3)	−10.6 (12.9)	−14.9 (5.2)	−17.8 (0.0)
Average precipitation mm (inches)	42.8 (1.69)	37.2 (1.46)	49.2 (1.94)	61.1 (2.41)	76.4 (3.01)	59.5 (2.34)	29.4 (1.16)	38.8 (1.53)	54.2 (2.13)	83.1 (3.27)	84.7 (3.33)	64.8 (2.55)	681.2 (26.82)
Average precipitation days (≥ 1.0 mm)	5.8	5.3	6.3	7.7	8.6	6.2	4.1	4.5	5.3	6.6	7.4	7.0	74.7
Source: Meteociel

=== Geology and terrain ===
The commune, which is at the heart of the geology, has its specificities related to the ancient town built upstream of the cluse which the Bléone has worn into the Nappe de Digne to emerge into the tertiary basin of Valensole.

The districts of the town cover the alluvium of the streams which converge upstream of the Cluse. The most eastern suburbs joined a line of limestone hills with flint of the Carixian age, forming russet cliffs oriented to the south-west. The hot springs were captured, since ancient times, to the point where these carixian limestones are cut by the hack of the southernmost valley, descending from Entrages. Their healing powers are linked to their ascent along the gypsiferous Triassic levels of the sole thrust of the Nappe de Digne.

The most visible mountain of the commune is Le Cousson at 1,516 metres (4,974 ft); the Bigué rises to 1,653 metres (5,423 ft).

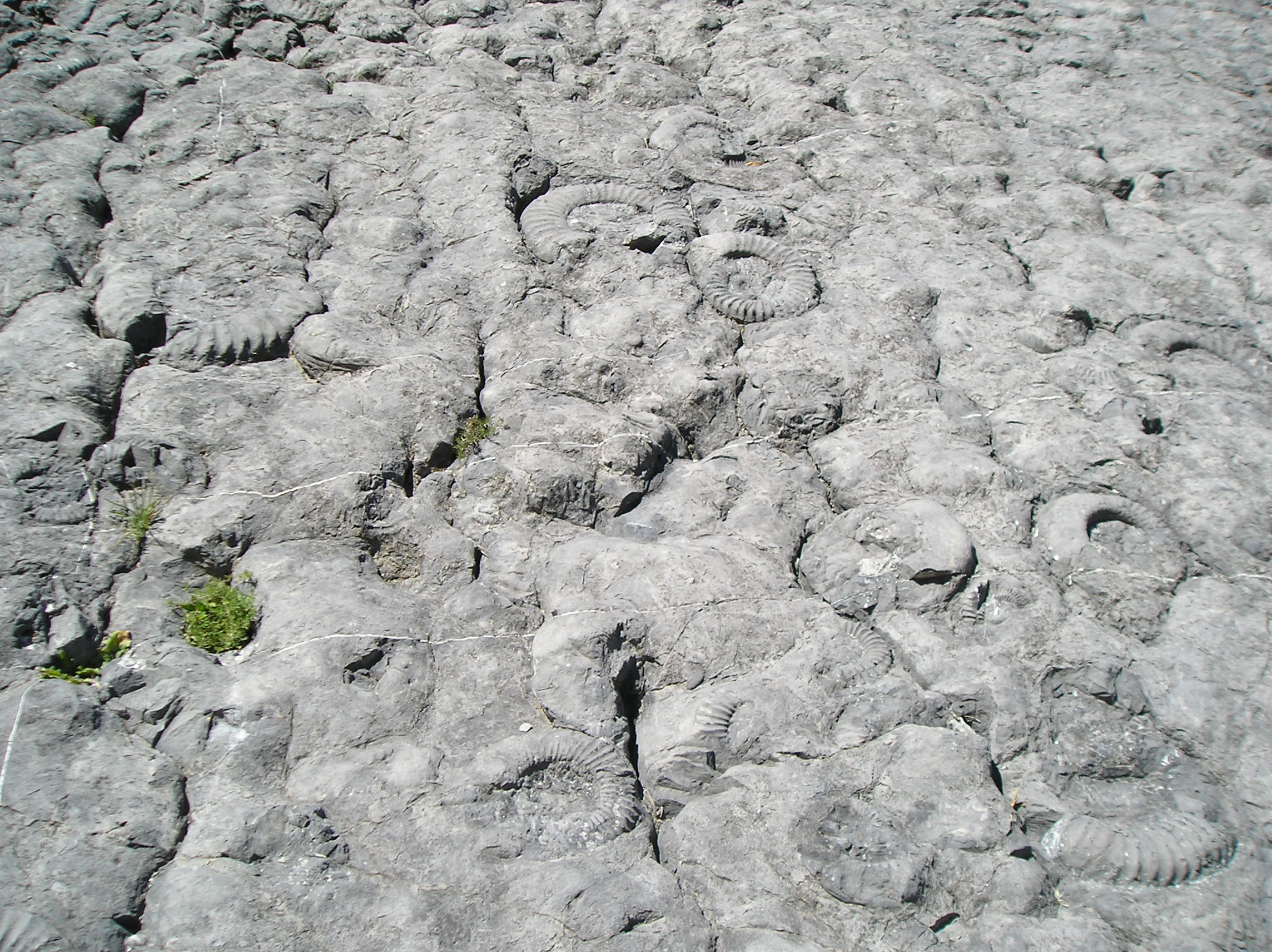
Slab ammonites

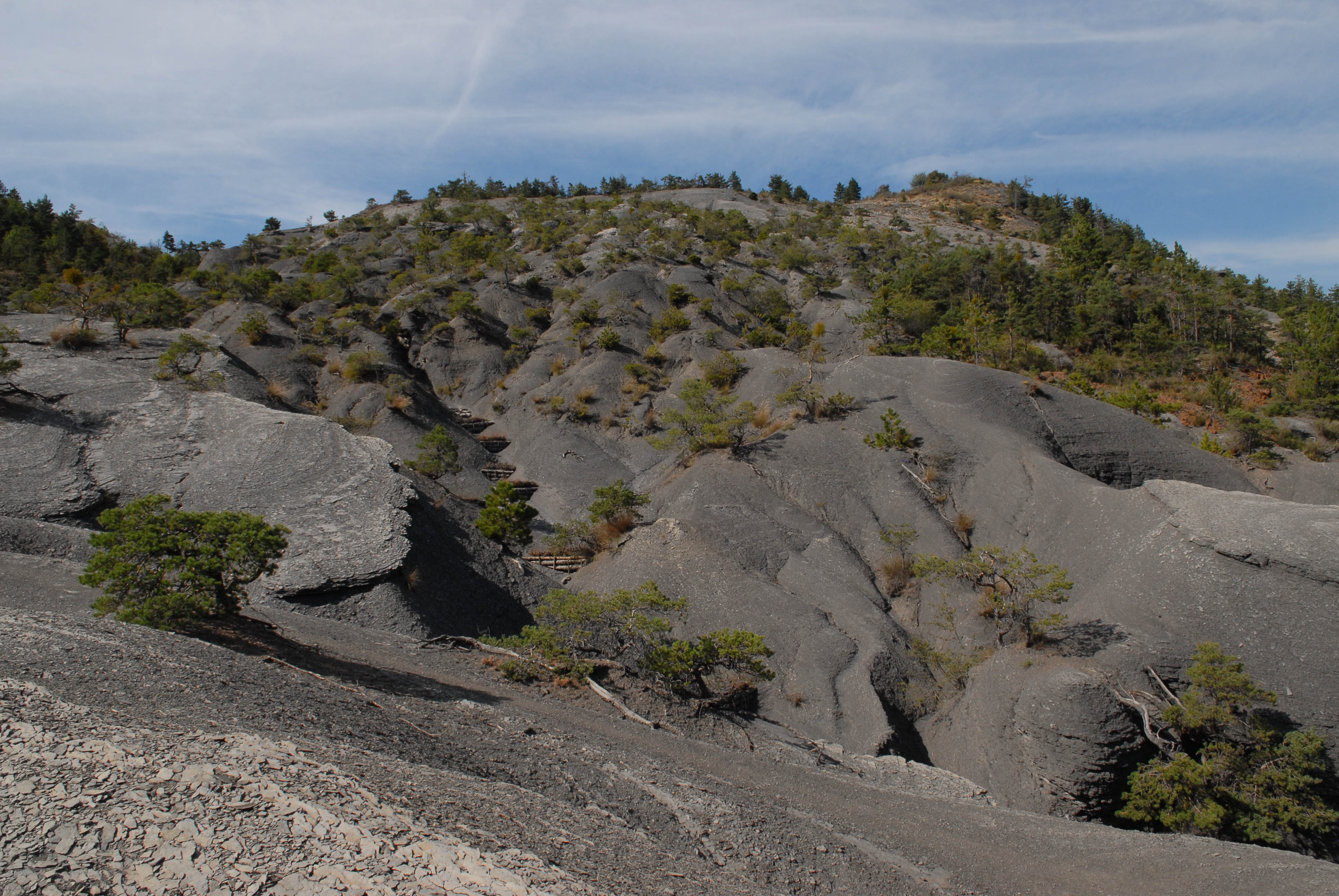
Marl of the Adret of Escure

Many reliefs lie around Digne and are objectives for hikers.

- The Rocher de Neuf Heures [Rock of Nine o'clock]
- Three chapels (the Chapel of our Lady of Lourdes, the Chapel of Saint-Vincent, and the Chapel La Croix)
- The right bank of the Bléone (Park of the Haute-Provence Geological Reserve, along the Caguerenard path, paths to access the top of the slope (over 200 metres (660 ft) above the town) and the crest of Andran - Martignon - La Bigue.
- Trails to access the Basses Bâties de Cousson, and then Le Cousson
- The Chapel of Saint Pancrace
- Barre des Dourbes

=== IUGS geological heritage site ===
In respect of its 'world famous and outstanding accumulation of fossils from a lower Jurassic marine environment', the International Union of Geological Sciences (IUGS) included the 'Ammonite Slab of Digne-les-Bains' in its assemblage of 100 'geological heritage sites' around the world in a listing published in October 2022. The organisation defines an IUGS Geological Heritage Site as 'a key place with geological elements and/or processes of international scientific relevance, used as a reference, and/or with a substantial contribution to the development of geological sciences through history.'

=== Hydrography ===
In the Eaux-Chaudes Valley, there is one cold and eight hot springs used for hydrotherapy. Some are radioactive, and contain sulfides, chlorobromides, and arsenic.

The town is also crossed by the Bléone and the Mardaric rivers.

=== Channels of communication and transport ===
==== Road network ====
N85 Route nationale 85
Towards the Mediterranean Sea		Towards Grenoble
Barrême	Digne-les-Bains	Mallemoisson

==== Railway network ====
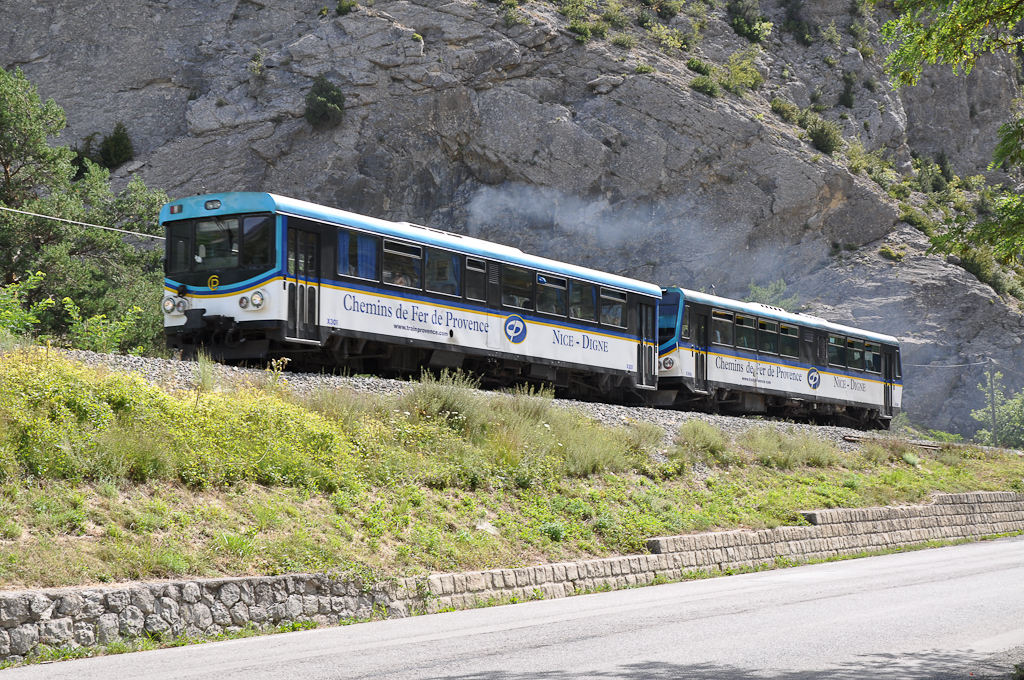
The Train des Pignes

The town is served by Chemins de fer de Provence via the Nice–Digne line, a narrow gauge line which operates daily. It is the Train des Pignes, which allows the railway to serve little inhabited places with many stations.

==== Public transport ====
Bus - Since 1992, Digne has the TUD (Urban Transport Digne), which manages the public transport. Initially with six buses, this service increased its vehicle fleet in 1998 with the acquisition of two buses powered by natural gas.

Currently, six bus routes are available to the people of Digne.

=== Natural and technological risks ===
None of the 200 communes of the Department is in the zero seismic risk zone. Digne townships are located in zone 1b (low seismicity) of the 1991 deterministic classification, based on the historic earthquakes, and in zone 4 (medium risk) according to the EC8 probabilistic classification 2011. The town of Digne is also exposed to three other natural risks:

- Forest fire
- Flooding (in the Bléone Valley) and in those of its tributaries;
- Land movement: all the western part of the municipality is covered by a medium to strong hazard.

The town of Digne is also exposed to a risk of technological origin, that of transport of dangerous goods, by rail, road and pipeline. With regard to the railway, the Saint-Auban to Digne railway line is disused and has no traffic; the line from Nice to Digne is used by passenger transport. Route nationale 85 and the departmental road RD 900 (former Route nationale 100) can be used for the road transport of dangerous goods. Finally, the pipeline to supply natural gas is an additional risk factor to Digne.

The foreseeable natural risk prevention plan (PPR) of the town was approved in 2008 for the risks of flooding, movement of land and earthquakes and the DICRIM has existed since 2009.

The commune has been the subject of several orders of natural disaster: in 1984 for an earthquake, and many times for floods, landslides and mudslides, and landslides due to drought. Also included is a flood disaster prior to the orders: The waters of the Mardaric and Eaux-Chaudes which flooded the town in 1928, and the Bléone in 1973 which partially destroyed the bridge. This destruction was caused by the breakdown of a jam created in the bed of the Bès, causing a wave of flooding. Similarly, several massive landslides have happened in the history of the commune, for example on 24 December 1916, which caused the collapse of part of Courbons, and 2002–2003 at Villard-des-Dourbes. Earthquakes have a long history in Digne. Retaining those macro-seismic events felt higher than level V on the MSK scale (sleepers awake, falling objects), we obtain the following list (the specified intensities are those felt in the town, the intensity may be stronger at epicentre):

- The earthquake of 31 August 1684, an intensity felt Digne of V.5 and whose epicentre was located at Digne
- The earthquake of 2 December 1872, an intensity felt V and whose epicentre was located at Digne
- The earthquake of 20 September 1876, an intensity felt V.5 and whose epicentre was located at Digne
- The earthquake of 23 February 1887, an intensity felt VII and whose epicentre was located in Bussana Vecchia (Liguria)
- The earthquake of 27 September 1911, an intensity felt V and whose epicentre was located at Barrême
- The earthquake of 16 February 1915, an intensity felt V and a half and whose epicentre was located at Digne
- The earthquake of 19 June 1984, of an intensity felt V and whose epicentre was located in Aiglum

=== Attached communes ===
Courbons (Corbo, cited in the 13th century but the church is cited as 1180) was attached to Digne in 1862. The Priory of Sainte-Eugénie, ancestor of the parish church, was part of the chapter of Digne. Jews installed here were massacred in 1335. Its fortifications were destroyed by Lesdiguières during the Wars of Religion (1590). It had 80 feus in 1315, 90 in 1471 and 507 inhabitants in 1765.

Les Dourbes (De Dorbas, cited in 1035) was attached to Digne in 1974, as an associated commune. The village is located on a barrier and a Motte-and-bailey castle was built in the 11th century. It had 48 feus in 1315, 12 in 1471 and 249 inhabitants in 1765, 296 inhabitants in 1851, 62 in 1982.

Gaubert (Galbertum, cited in 1180) was attached to Digne in 1862. The parish church was part of the chapter of Digne, who collected the tithe. The square, defended by the Catholic League and Sautaire, was taken by Lavalette in 1591. It had 63 feus in 1315, 41 in 1471 and 456 inhabitants in 1765.

Les Sieyes, or just Sieyes, for short (Lascieias, cited in the 13th century) was attached to Digne in 1862. There were 10 feus in 1315, 13 in 1471 and 307 inhabitants in 1765. The two priories, Sainte-Madeleine and Saint-Véran, were part of the chapter of Digne which received the tithes.

During the Revolution, these four municipalities each had a patriotic society, all created after the end of 1792.

== Toponymy ==
The toponym Dinia is known from the 1st century AD (Ptolemy, Pliny the elder). Various hypotheses have been advanced. According to Papon, the name is formed by the hydronym Din (Gaulish water), with the suffix -ia. According to other scholars, the name is derived from a Roman proper noun, Din(n)ius.

The current name of Digne-les-Bains was formalised on 25 June 1988, following the decree of 21 June 1988 published on 24 June of the same year in the Official Journal. Previously, the commune was simply called Digne, still a frequent appellation in the current language.

The Vivaro-Alpine Occitan [ˈdiɲɔ], is written as Dinha in the classical norm. The Provençal [ˈdiɲɔ], is written as Digno in the Mistralian norm.

== History ==
=== Prehistory and antiquity ===
Digne-les-Bains dates back to the Neolithic era. The presence of three rivers, the Bléone, the Mardaric, and the Eaux-Chaudes, made the place ideal for human settlement. Before the Roman conquest, it was the capital of the Bodiontici (or Brodiontii), whose name is found on the Tropaeum Alpium at La Turbie. The town then became a Roman town named Dinia in the 1st century, and became a frequent commercial stop during the Roman era. Following the Romans, it was known as Digna by 780, and was appreciated for its thermal waters.

There are a few rural settlements near to the town, such as the Hôtelleries de Gaubert, southeast of the town, where the excavated building was occupied from the beginning of the 1st century to the end of the 4th century. In this area, at the foot of Le Cousson, the soil has been cultivated continuously, from antiquity right up to the recent reforestation.

=== Middle Ages ===
Two separate districts were formed: The town and the city. The town, an ancient site, was surrounded with the castrum of the episcopal chateau built on the Rock. The two neighbourhoods functioned as two independent entities from each other and from their inception. The town remained under the supervision of the provost of the chapter while the city or castrum was of the bishop. The arrival of the Angevins at the head of the County of Provence in 1246 accelerated the recovery process of the comital rights usurped during the previous period by lay or ecclesiastical lords.

The return of the comtal power in the city led to a change in the relationship between local authorities and community: In 1260, the city of Digne was given the right to appoint cominaux responsible for ensuring the management of the city. The consolidation of the two sites was done administratively in 1385 by institutional trustees, replacing the cominaux, responsible for representing both the city and the village. The institution evolved with administrative rationalisation at the beginning of the 15th century.

From 1475, preaching by Franciscans caused several murderous anti-Jewish riots.

=== Early Modern era ===
Like the rest of France, Digne was taken in the Wars of Religion. In 1562, the Huguenots broke into the cathedral, shredded the tables and smashed statues, removed relics and ornaments and burnt them with the choir on the forecourt. The town was attacked by Protestants in 1574. In 1575, it was the Church of Saint-Jérôme which was sacked. In the following years, the city remained under pressure. In 1579, the captain of Archal occupied the surrounding countryside.

In 1589, with the advent of Henry IV, the ultra-Catholics in the Catholic League controlled the town, until 1591. The same year, the town fell before the Royal armies of Lesdiguières. The cathedral, guarded by the defenders, was attacked, bombarded with catapults and then stormed. It is also during this period that the inhabitants seized the château of the bishops, on Le Rochas, destroying it to prevent it from falling into the hands of one party or another.

=== French Revolution and the First Empire ===
The news of the storming of the Bastille was welcomed, this event announced the end of royal arbitrariness and, perhaps, more profound changes in the organization of the France. Immediately after the arrival of the new, a great phenomenon of collective fear seized France, the fear of an aristocratic conspiracy wishing to recover their privileges. Rumors of troops in arms, devastating everything in their path, propagated at high speed, causing shots of weapons, the organization of militias and anti-aristocratic violence. This great fear, arrived in Seyne on 31 July and belonging to the current "fear of the Mâconnais", reached Digne and its region on 31 July 1789 the day before spreading to Riez, where it arrived during the day, and Moustiers and Castellane.

The city was established as the capital of the Basses-Alpes district from March 1790, to the creation of the departments. The patriotic society of Digne was founded in September 1790 (the second Department by seniority); it was affiliated with the Jacobins in June 1791, and became a relay of the club in the Department, accepting the affiliations of many clubs in the Basses-Alpes. It also received the request of affiliation of Carpentras. First called Bourgeois Alcove, it then took the name of Patriotic Club, then on 9 October 1792, Société des amis de la Constitution, de la Liberté, de l’Égalité [Society of friends of the Constitution, of freedom, of equality]. It established a committee of correspondence responsible for relations with other societies affiliated on 14 November 1792. On 10 and 11 January 1793, General Peyron performed a descent from Marseille, supported by the Marseille club-goers with weapons. He took revenge because he was unable to obtain the post of attorney general trustee, two departmental administrators were removed and a fine of 13,000 livres paid to the Marseille club.

In 1792–1793, the section of Digne was controlled by the federalists. In connection with the section of Marseille, it disseminated the ideas of the Girondists, until their proscription on 31 May 1793 and the crushing of the federalist insurrection in July, which resulted in a sentence to death in Digne.

On 5 frimaire year III, the Représentant en mission Gauthier purified the society.

Digne welcomed the prefecture under the Consulate. The prefect Lameth (1802–1805), created a shaded promenade between Pré de Foire and the banks of the Bléone and planted plane trees on the boulevard Gassendi.

In early March 1815 Emperor Napoleon passed through Digne-les-Bains on his way from imprisonment on the island of Elba, gathering support as he moved north. This was early in his Hundred Days which ended with his defeat at the Battle of Waterloo.

=== Contemporary era ===
In 1851, the announcement of the coup d'état of 2 December caused uplift in rural areas, and peasants installed a provisional government in Digne.

As many municipalities of the Department Digne acquired schools well before the Jules Ferry laws. However, no instruction was given to girls in 1861, only the Falloux Laws (1851) required the opening of a girls school in the communes with more than 800 inhabitants (and that Courbons and Gaubert, small neighbouring rural communes, have a girls school). It was only in the 1860s that the town of Digne chose to open a school for girls (plus the Gaubert and Courbons schools for girls). It was with the Ferry laws that all girls of Digne and the attached villages were regularly educated.

In 1862, Digne absorbed the neighbouring areas of Courbons, Gaubert and Les Sieyes. These connected communes also had their schools, each a school for boys, with Courbons and Gaubert furthermore possessing a school for girls. The commune of Dourbes had two schools for boys (at Dourbes and at Villard), and none for girls.

210 people of Digne died for France during World War I. The hospital took care of the soldiers injured in the fighting, including nearly seventy who died of their injuries, and are buried in the military cemetery of the village square. This square also includes the bodies of two soldiers who died during the Second World War.

==== WWII ====
The first resistance fighters were a group organized around Simone Pellissier who distributed the journal Combat, from 1941. On 1 May 1942, she laid a wreath at the war memorial, during a demonstration; she was arrested the next day with six other protesters.

Digne was occupied by Italy, then by the German army, following the invasion of the free zone, after the landing of the Allies in North Africa on 8 November 1942. Thirty-four Jews were arrested in Digne before being deported.

With the dissolution of the Armée de Vichy, Commandant Chaumont of the 20th bataillon de chasseurs alpins began to structure the local Organisation de résistance de l'armée (ORA).

=== Liberation ===
On 16 August 1944, the city was bombed by P-47 Thunderbolts, which took off from field close to Bastia in Corsica. Their goal was the great bridge of Digne, crossing the Bléone, but only a single bomb reached the bridge, impeding the passage of vehicles for only a few hours. Several buildings were damaged. The bombing killed twenty-four civilians and two Germans (25 in total according to Jean Garcin). The city was liberated on 19 August 1944 by Taskforce Butler, a motorized detachment of armoured elements, infantry and artillery from the 36th U.S. "Texas" infantry division and the 45th U.S. infantry division, assisted by the forces of the Resistance.

The release of Digne was part of a movement of circumvention of the Rhône Valley, across the Alps, by the Route Napoléon, entrusted to Taskforce Butler and which aimed to cut the retreat of the German army stationed in Provence. In Aspres-sur-Buëch, the column moved westward, in the direction of the Rhône and Crest (Battle of Montelimar). The fighting was in the day, with six killed and eleven wounded on the Allied side and at least 21 killed on the German side. German soldiers who fell during the fighting for the liberation of Digne were buried in the German military square of the cemetery of the village, with the other soldiers killed during the occupation, during various battles against the forces of Resistance. In March 1958, their bodies were exhumed and transferred to the German military cemetery of Dagneux in Ain.

Immediately after the Liberation, the cleanup began. Executions after trials (with a judge, but without lawyers) took place.

The German prisoner of war camp had up to 2,700 prisoners. One of them participated in the rescue expedition after the double air disaster of the Montagne du Cheval Blanc in 1948.

=== The end of the war ===
From the beginning of 1945, new convoys of troops moved through the town, in the direction of the pockets of German resistance around the Ubaye.

=== From 1945 to the early 21st century ===
In 1974, the neighboring village of Dourbes was attached to Digne. The municipality changed its name to Digne-les-Bains in 1988. Nowadays, the town of Digne-les-Bains continues to expand, mainly along the banks of the Bléone. It forms, with Entrages, Marcoux, La Robine-sur-Galabre, and Mezel, the Communauté de communes des Trois-Vallées (CC3V). The areas of Le Pigeonnier and Barbejas have been classified as Sensitive urban zones.

On 24 March 2015 Germanwings Flight 9525, carrying 150 people (including six crewmembers), had a rapid descent from cruising altitude approximately 45 minutes after takeoff. It crashed a few miles from the city, en route to Düsseldorf from Barcelona.

== Politics and administration ==
=== List of mayors ===
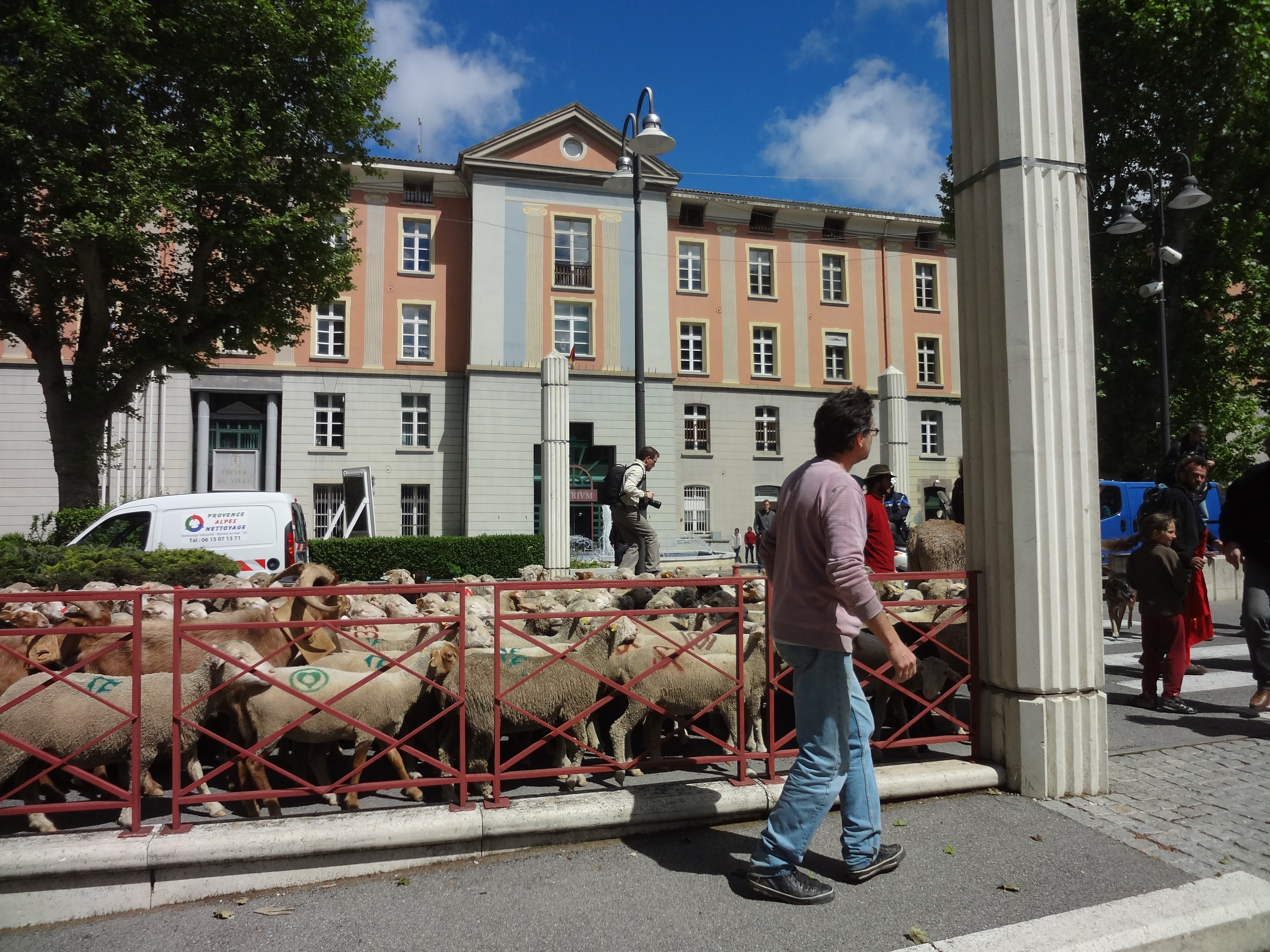
Digne-les-Bains Town Hall, former Desmichel barracks

List of mayors since the Liberation
Term start	Term end	Name	Affiliation	Other details
1944	1946	Joseph Fontaine	Resistance	President of the Comité départemental de libération, President of the délégation spéciale, Arises and is elected under the Resistance label in May 1945
1946	1947	Paul Jouve	SFIO	General councillor, Senator
1947	1971	Julien Romieu	PR	Medical doctor, General councillor
1971	1977	René Villeneuve		
March 1977	June 1995	Pierre Rinaldi	RPR	Member of the National Assembly (1993), President of the General Council (1992–1998)
June 1995	March 2001	Jean-Louis Bianco	PS	Secretary-General of the Élysée (1982–1991), Cabinet member (1991–1993), Regional councillor (1992–1998), Member of the National Assembly (1997–2012), President of the General Council (1998–2012), Deputy Mayor (2001–2002)
March 2001	April 2014	Serge Gloaguen	PS then DVG (PS/DVG)	Regional councillor (2004–2010), President of the CC Asse Bléone Verdon (2013–2014)
April 2014	In office	Patricia Granet-Brunello	DVG (PS/DVG)	Hospital doctor, Departmental councillor (2015–2021), President of the CC Asse Bléone Verdon (2014–2016), President of the CA Provence-Alpes (2017–present)
After the Conseil d'État nullified the results of the 2020 municipal election in Digne-les-Bains, the prefect of Alpes-de-Haute-Provence appointed a délégation spéciale presided by Hervé Belmont (22 October – 17 December 2021). Patricia Granet-Brunello then returned to the mayorship.

List of mayors from the French Revolution to the Liberation
Start	End	Name	Party	Other details
1789	30 December 1790	Dr Ricavy Jean Baptiste		Medical doctor
1791	1792	Joseph-Paul Simon		
1792	1793	Melchior Dieudé		
1794	1795	François Colomb Duvillard		
1796	1798	Louis Francoul		
1798	1800	Toussaint Itard		
1800	1802	Jean Allibert		
1802	1805	Paul Francoul		
1805	1806	François Grassy		
1806	1810	Gaspard Sauve		
1810	1815	François Gassendy Tartonne		
1815	1816	Pierre Itard		
1816	1818	Léon du Chaffaut		
1818	1821	François Grassy		
1821	1821	Etienne Hesmiol de Berre		
1821	1825	Bienvenu Victorien de Jassaud de Thorame		
1825	1829	Jules du Chaffaut		
1829	1831	Jean-Baptiste Gras		
1831	1831	Fantin Itard		
1831	1834	Antoine Fortoul		
1834	1837	Hugues Hugues		
1837	1844	Pierre Allibert		
1844	1848	Julien Francoul		
1848	1849	Joseph Itard		
1849	1852	Alexandre Fruchier		
1852	1857	Alexandre Allibert		
1857	1860	Achille de Vallavieille		
1860	1870	Auguste Hugues		
1870	1874	Paul Roustan		
1874	1879	Louis Builly		
1880	1881	Jules Blanc		
1881	1897	Marius Soustre		
1897	1919	Docteur Charles Romieu		
1919	1921	Joseph Reinach		
1921	1921	Eugène Vial		
1921	1929	Charles Fruchier		
1929	1935	Charles Bouquier		
1935	1936	Charles Fruchier		
1936	1941	Julien Romieu	Republican, Radical and Radical-Socialist Party	Medical doctor
1942	1944	Henri Evrard		

=== Cantons ===
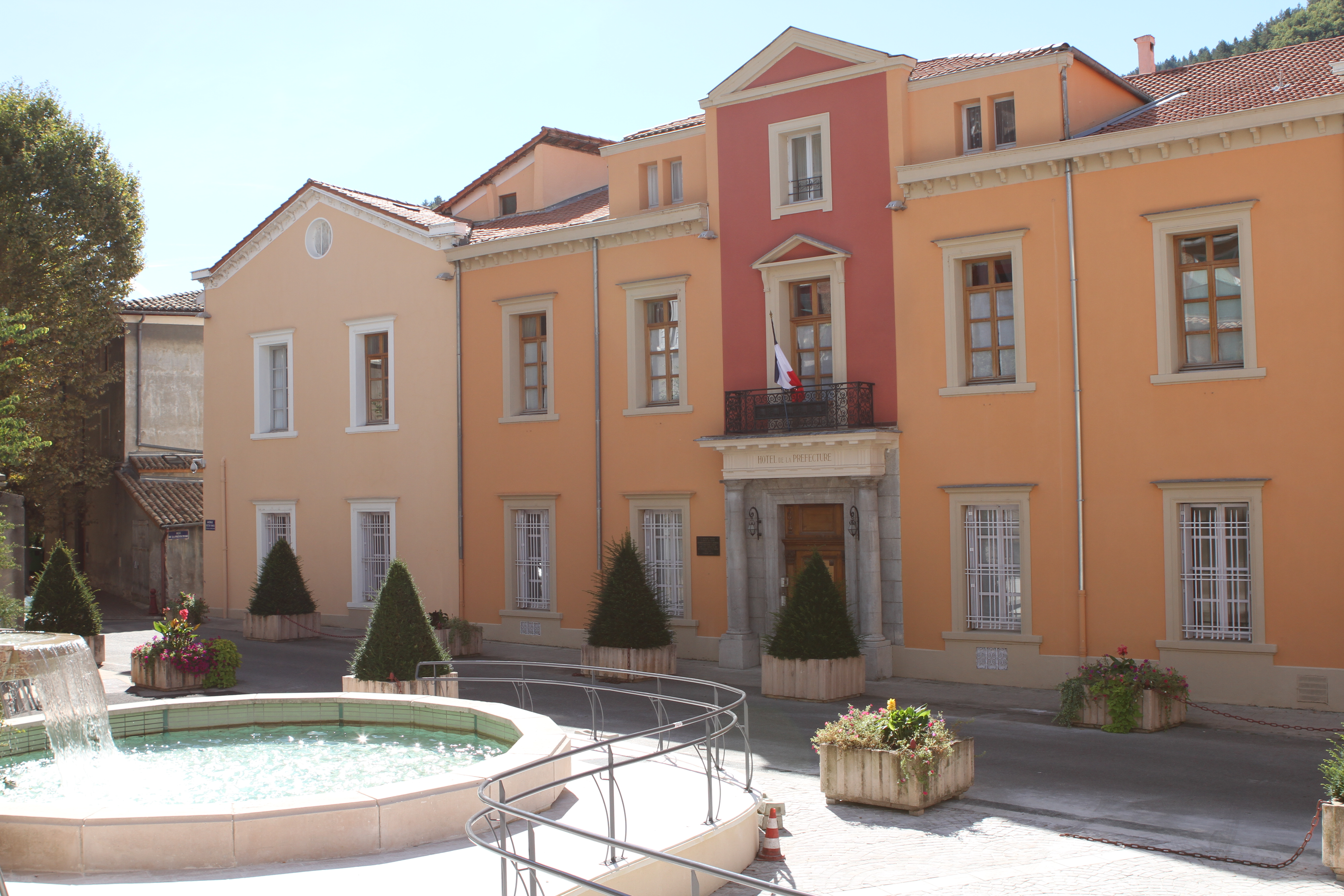
Alpes-de-Haute-Provence prefecture building in Digne-les-Bains

Digne-les-Bains is divided into two cantons:

Departemental councillors	Affiliation	Canton	Cantonal code	Population (2012)
René Massette	PS	Digne-les-Bains-1	04 04	11,965 (incl. 10,189 within the commune)
Geneviève Primiterra	PS	Digne-les-Bains-1	04 04	11,965 (incl. 10,189 within the commune)
Pierre Catillon	LR	Digne-les-Bains-2	04 05	12,398 (incl. 6,655 within the commune)
Sandra Raponi	LR	Digne-les-Bains-2	04 05	12,398 (incl. 6,655 within the commune)

=== Intercommunality ===
Digne is part of the following communities:

- From 2002 to 2013, of the Community of communes of les Trois Vallées, (of which it was the seat)
- From 2013 to 2017, of the Communauté de communes Asse Bléone Verdon (of which it was the seat)
- Since 1 January 2017, of the Communauté d'agglomération Provence-Alpes (of which it is the seat)

=== Environmental policy ===
Digne-les-Bains is ranked three flowers in the Contest of Flowery Towns and Villages. The city was rewarded with the three flowers in 2007's Contest of Flowery Towns and Villages.

=== International relations ===
Digne is twinned with:

- Bad Mergentheim, Germany
- Borgomanero, Italy
- Douma, Lebanon
- Kamaishi, Iwate Prefecture, Japan (20 April 1994)

== Population and society ==
=== Demography ===
Historical population
Year	Pop.	±% p.a.
1968	14,722	—
1975	15,416	+0.66%
1982	15,149	−0.25%
1990	16,087	+0.75%
1999	16,064	−0.02%
2007	17,455	+1.04%
2012	16,844	−0.71%
2017	16,460	−0.46%
2023	17,979	+1.48%
Source: INSEE

In 2006, the commune launched a housing construction project aiming to increase the population beyond 20,000 inhabitants (the lower threshold for obtaining certain public aid).

=== Area and population ===
The town of Digne-les-Bains has an area of 117.07 square kilometres (45.20 sq mi) and a population of 17,268 inhabitants, ranked as follows:

Rank	Population	Area	Density
France	553rd	147th	5,414th
Provence-Alpes-Côte d'Azur	43rd	19th	220th
Alpes-de-Haute-Provence	2nd	8th	6th
Arrondissement of Digne-les-Bains	1st	3rd	2nd

=== Education ===
Seat of the prefecture, and the inspection académique of Provence, the city of Digne also has the main educational establishments of the Department:

- Fourteen schools, 11 primary schools, a private primary school (under contract and whose teachers are employees of National Education), and two nursery schools
- The Maria-Borrely and Pierre-Gassendi collèges
- Three lycées, including the Lycée professionnel Beau-de-Rochas, the Pierre-Gilles-de-Gennes and the multipurpose Alexandra-David-Neel school, which offers also two BTS certificates and further training of local initiative
- A University Institute of Technology, which provides lessons in agronomy, DUT engineering of the environment, DUT administrative and commercial management, DUT quality industrial logistics and organization, business tourism, geomatics professional license
- A Graduate School of Teaching and Education (ESPE)

=== Sports ===
Digne was elected as the Sportiest town in France among towns with less than 20,000 inhabitants in 2006, by the daily newspaper L'Équipe.

The town has several sports facilities, with free access or reserved for the many sporting clubs and schools. These include gyms, a stadium, an equestrian centre, a golf course, and a public swimming pool. It is one of the rare French towns to provide free access to tennis courts.

At the request of the Junior Town Council, a skatepark has been renovated which is open access.

=== Health ===
The town's hospitals have 480 beds.

=== Garrison city ===
The following units have held garrison in Digne:

- 22nd light infantry regiment (one battalion in the middle of the 19th century);
- 3rd infantry regiment

Currently, several gendarmerie units are based in Digne. In addition to the capital of community brigade, there is a motorised brigade, a platoon of monitoring and intervention (PSIG) and a squadron of Mobile Gendarmerie.

=== Religion ===
For Catholic worship, the city is the seat of the departmental bishopric, and therefore the Diocese of Digne, Riez and Sisteron. The bishop is Monsignor Jean-Philippe Nault. He was appointed in 2014 and is the youngest Bishop of France (born in 1965). The Catholic faithful have two places of worship for Mass: Notre-Dame-du-Bourg and Saint-Jérôme. The members of the Muslim faith also have their place of worship, as well as Protestants and Evangelicals.

Cardinal Jean-Pierre Ricard retired here in 2019 from Bordeaux. He later admitted to "behav[ing] in a reprehensible way with a young girl aged 14" while at Marseille some 35 years previously, as confirmed on 7 November 2022 by Archbishop Éric de Moulins-Beaufort, the president of the Bishops' Conference of France.

== Economy ==
=== Revenues of the population and taxation ===
The taxation of households and businesses to Digne les Bains in 2010
Tax	Communal	Intercomunal	Departmental	Regional
Housing Tax (TH)	21.60%	0.00%	5.53%	0.00%
Land tax on the built-up properties (TFPB)	44.68%	0.00%	14.49%	2.36%
Land tax on the non built-up properties (TFPNB)	81.75%	0.00%	47.16%	8.85%
Business tax (TP)	0.00%*	37.01%	0.00%	0.00%

=== Employment ===
In 2017, the active population amounted to 6,422 persons, including 939 unemployed. These workers are mostly employed (86%) and are employed in the town (83%).

=== Agriculture ===
At the end of 2015, the primary sector (agriculture, forestry, fishing) had 27 active institutions within the meaning of INSEE (including non-professional operators) and 144 salaried jobs.

The number of professional farms, according to the Agreste survey of the Ministry of Agriculture, is 37 in 2010. It was 44 in 2000, and 106 in 1988. Currently, these operators are essentially turned to breeding sheep and cattle. From 1988 to 2000, the useful agricultural land (SAU) strongly increased, from 1,002 hectares (2,480 acres) to 2,902 hectares (7,170 acres). The SAU has increased slightly during the last decade, to 2,989 hectares (7,390 acres).

The agricultural activity of the surrounding communes allows the existence of Alp'Agri, an agricultural dealer with 30 employees.

The vine was cultivated for wine into the 1950s, which led to local consumption in Digne. This cultivation has declined, to occupy no more than a few hectares in 2005.

The olive groves of the municipality can claim the Huile d'olive de Provence AOC [Olive Oil of Provence AOC] appellation.

=== Companies and shops ===
==== Industry ====
At the end of 2015, the secondary sector (industry and construction) had 213 institutions, using 348 employees, with no establishment exceeding 50 employees.

==== Shops ====
Two Provençal markets are held each week, the markets are held on Wednesday and Saturday.

The market in Digne-les-Bains

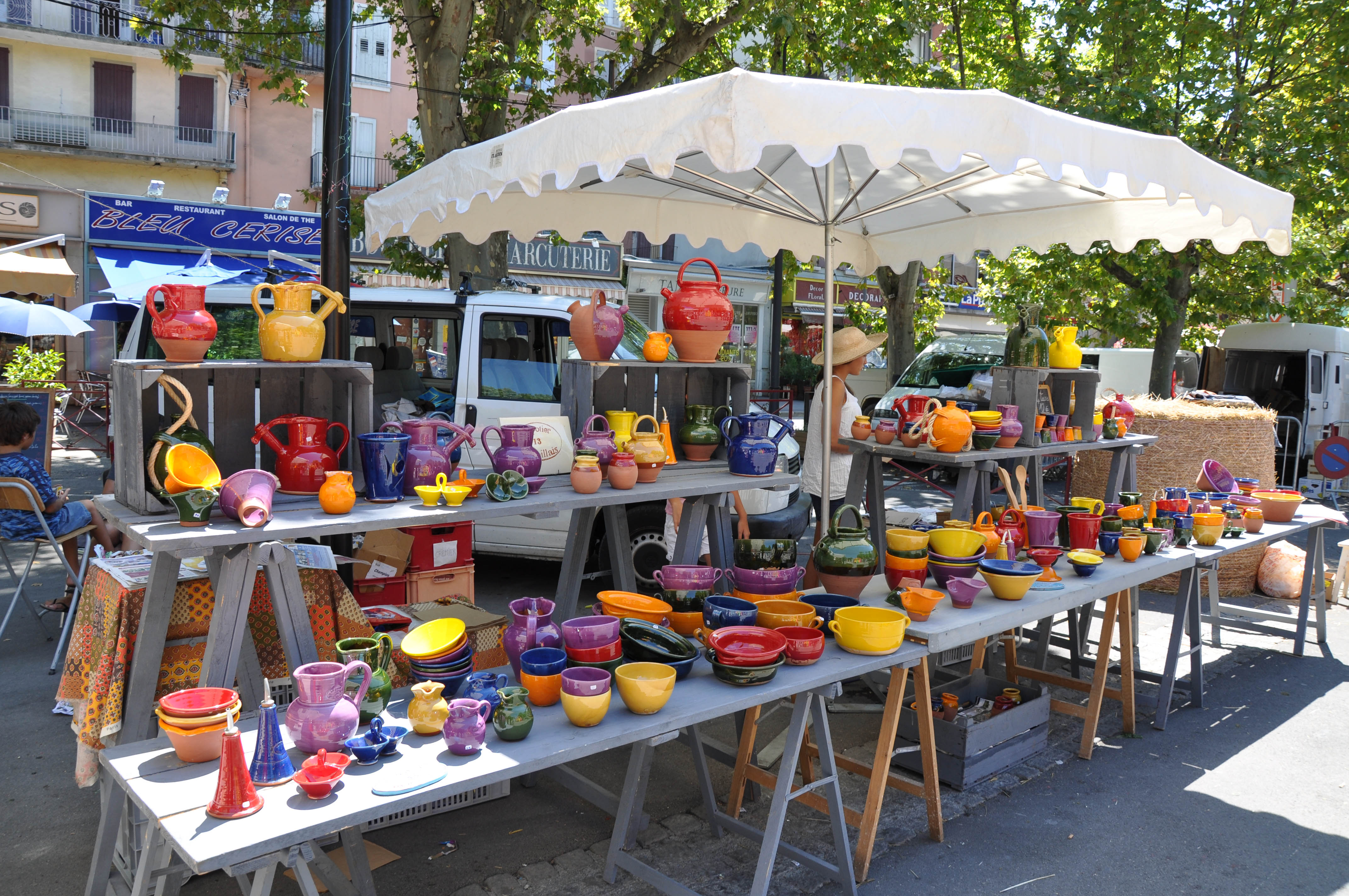
Provençal pottery

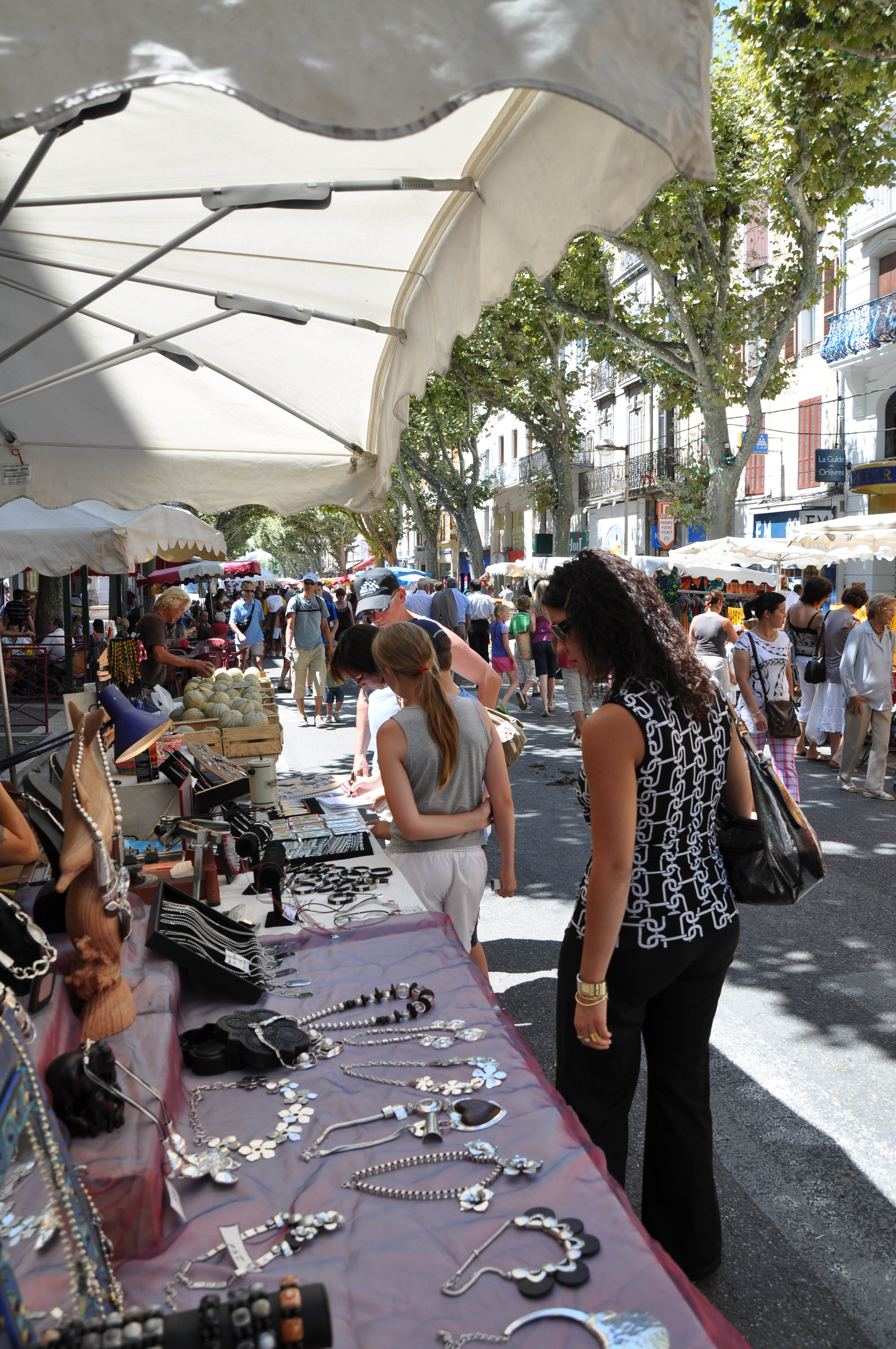
Arts and crafts

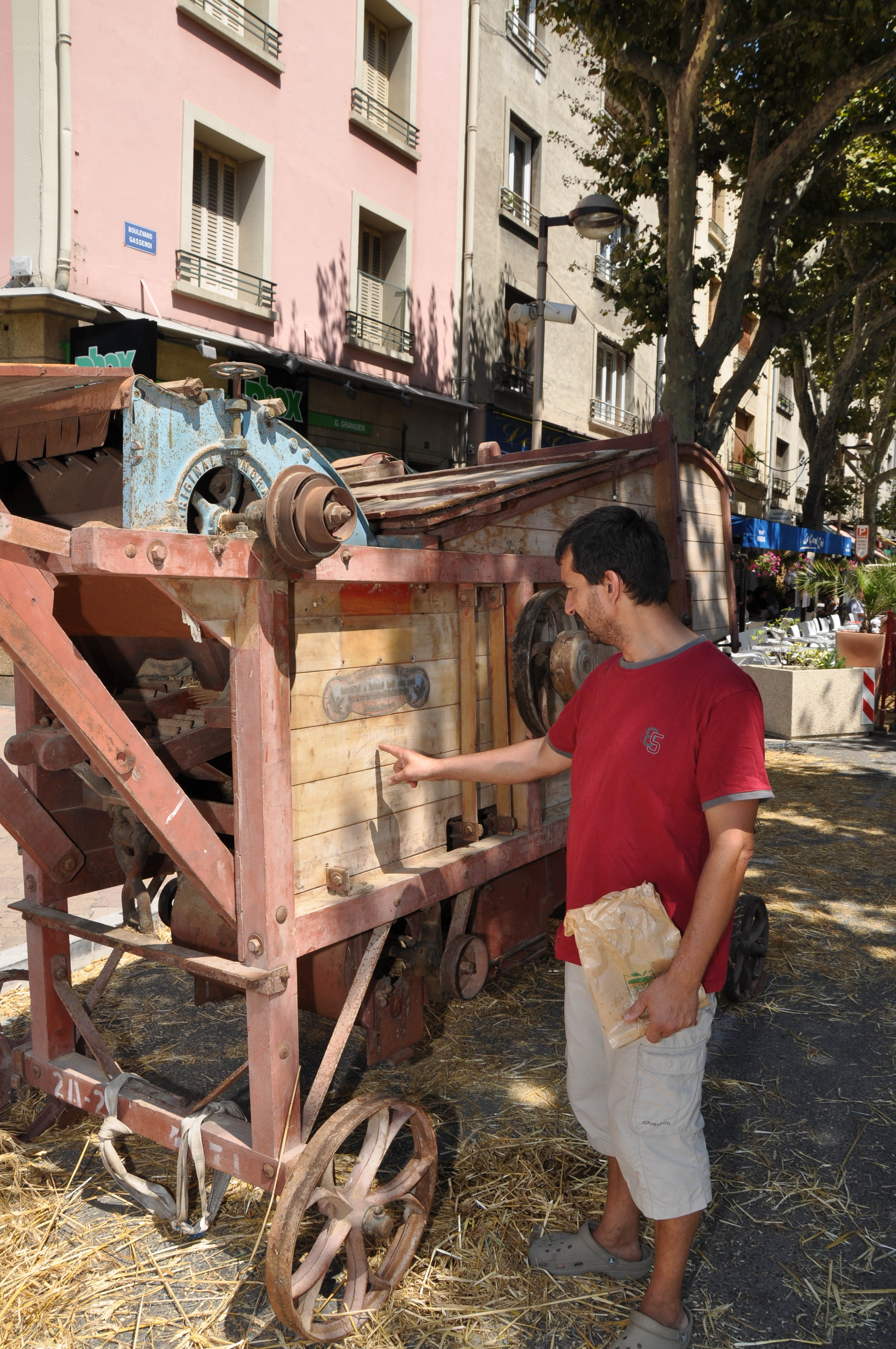
Old agricultural machinery exhibition

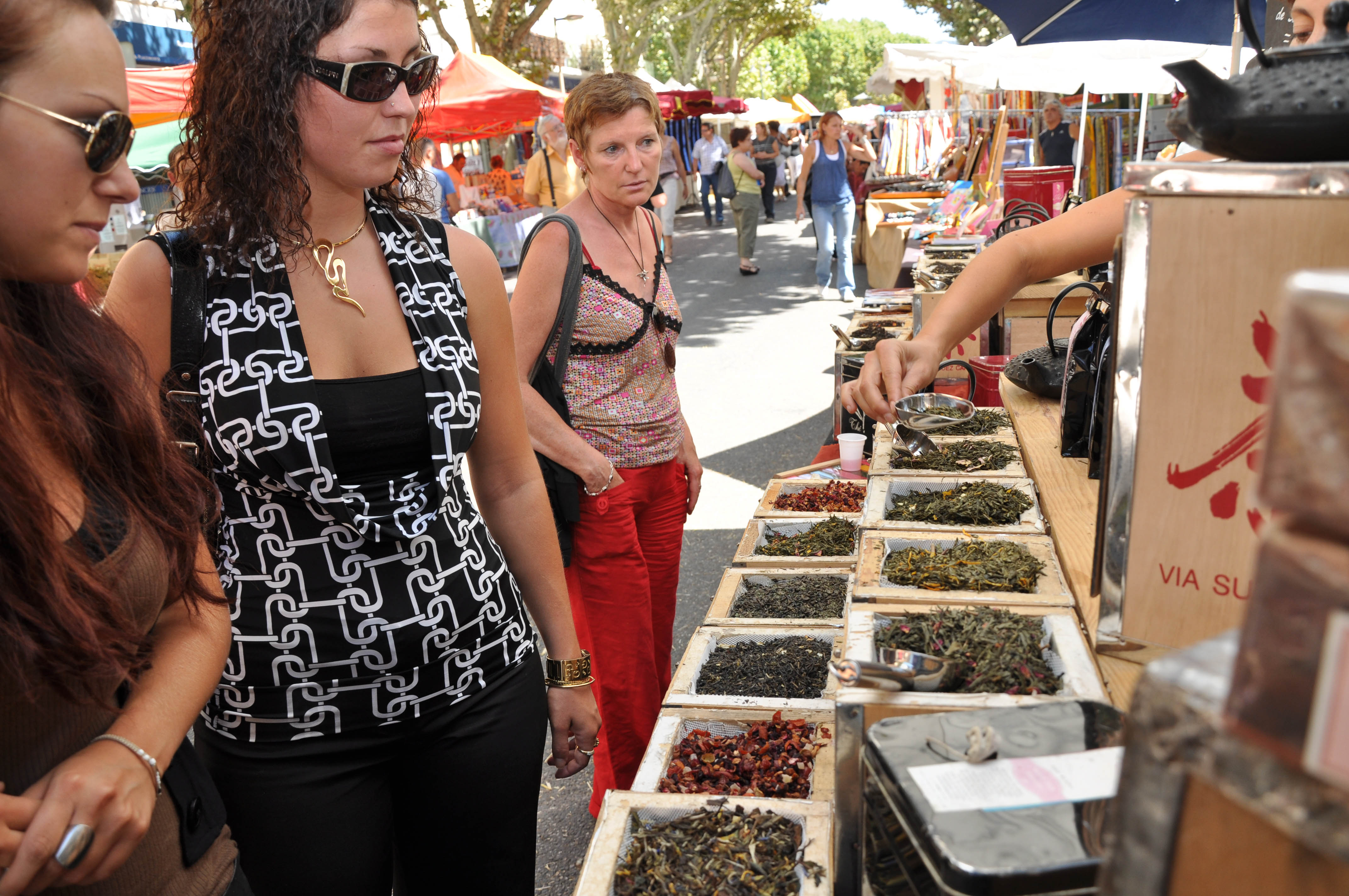
A stand selling olives

=== Service sector ===
At the end of 2015, the tertiary sector (commerce, services) had 1,096 establishments (with 2,777 salaried jobs), in addition to 420 institutions in the administrative sector (together with the health and social sector and education), employing 5,465 people.

Digne-les-Bains is the seat of the Chambre de commerce et d'industrie des Alpes-de-Haute-Provence. It manages the Sisteron-Thèze aerodrome and the J. Gage centre.

Chemins de Fer de Provence employs about 50 people in Digne.

SAMSE, a dealer in building materials, employs 73 people. Still in the area of trade, supermarkets are also important employers. Carrefour employs 250 people and Intermarché has 55 employees.

Orange employs approximately 300 employees. Among computer service companies, Xsalto, offering web hosting, development, and installation, employs 22 staff.

The banking sector provides also some employers. The Groupe Caisse d'Épargne has 50 employees, and the Bank of France has 30 employees. Finally, the Renault dealership is another large private employer, with 28 employees.

=== Tourism ===
==== Economic overview ====
According to the departmental observatory of tourism, the tourist function is secondary for the municipality, with less than one tourist greeted per capita. However, it offers substantial accommodation capacity, mainly merchant. Several accommodation facilities for tourism exist in the commune:

- There were 9 hotels in January 2020, of which 4 with two stars, 3 with three stars, and 2 unclassified. The total hotel capacity was 240 rooms.
- There are a two-star and a three-star campsite in the commune, with a total capacity of 251 pitches.
- Furnished or unfurnished apartments provide a capacity of hundreds of places.
- Bed and breakfast.
- Collective accommodation is also present with, among other things, lodges.

Finally, second homes provide a valuable complement to the capacity. 678 in number, these represent 6.5% of homes.

==== Thermal baths ====
The spa treats respiratory diseases and rheumatism. They use a hot spring at 50 °C and 110,000 overnight stays are made through this activity. The station is given financial autonomy to hire 76 employees in the high season (September–October). The establishment has a Zen Space and Fitness offering massages of the face and the body, and swimming in thermal water at 33 °C.

Hydrotheraphy in Digne-les-Bains

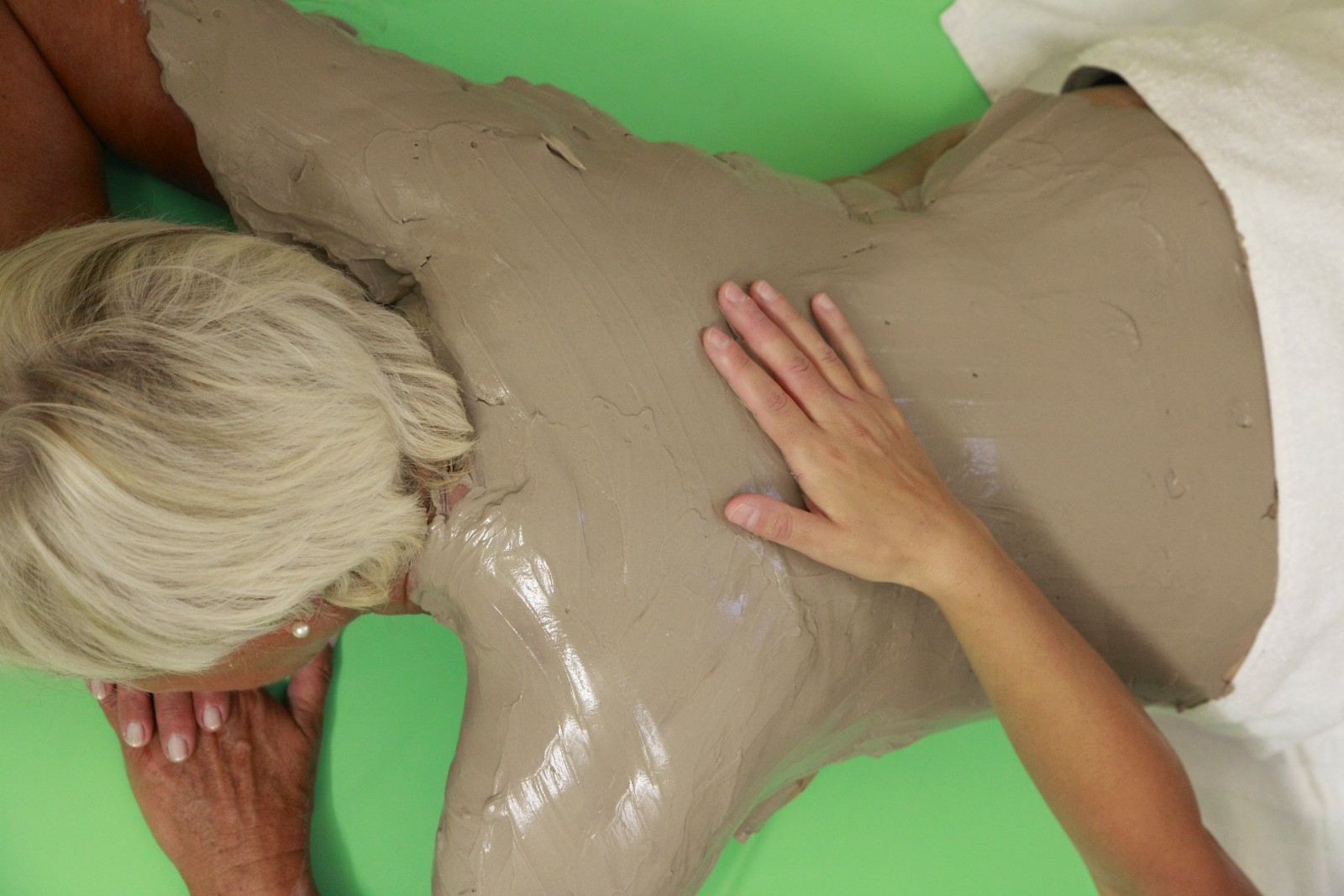
Hydrotherapy in Digne-les-Bains

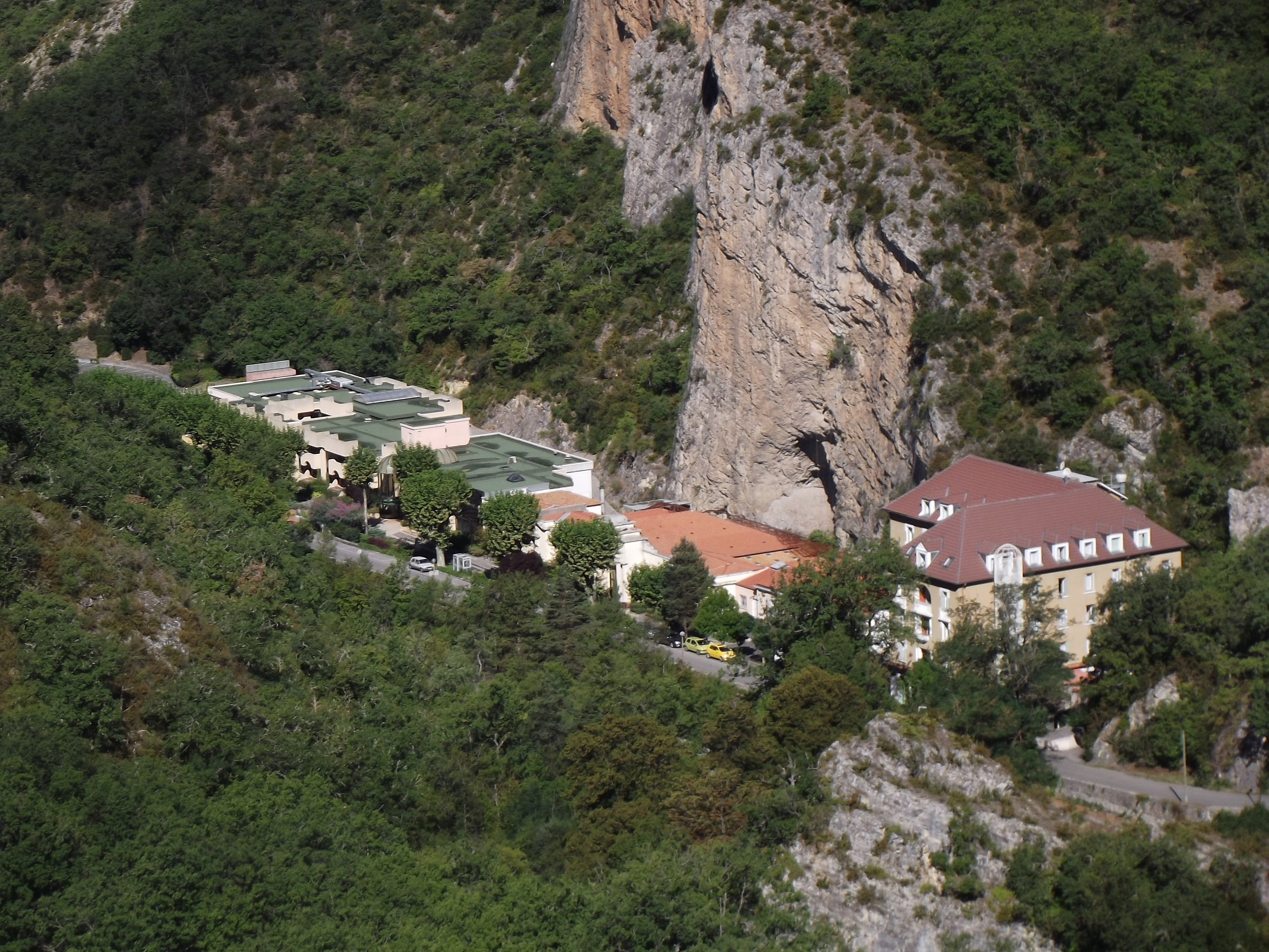
Spa buildings

== Local culture and heritage ==
=== Places and monuments ===
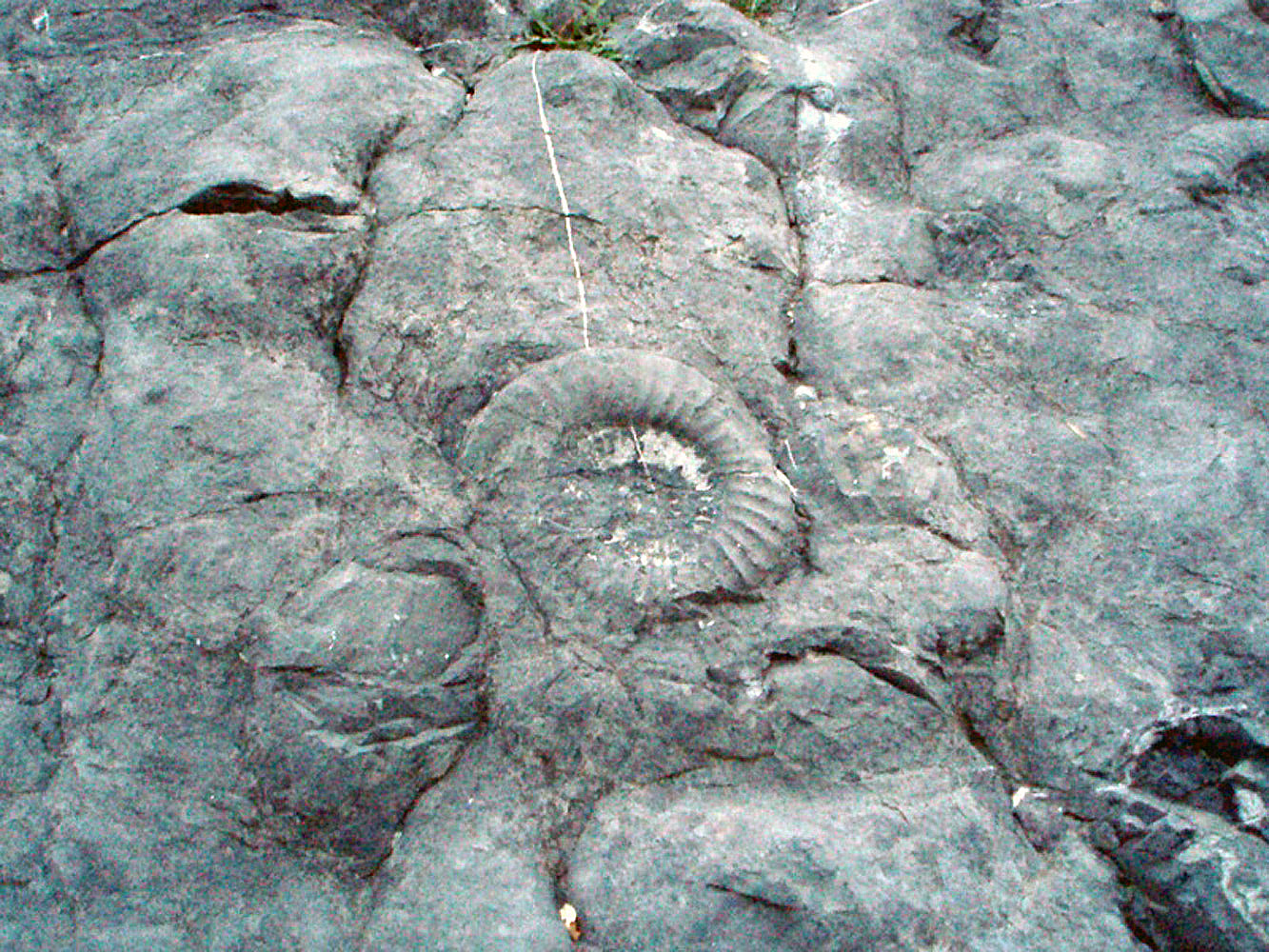
Detail of the Dalle à ammonites

The Dalle à ammonites, a classified site, is a rocky layer dating back 200 million years, where one can find more than 1,500 fossils of ammonites containing some which reach a diameter of 70 centimetres (28 in).

==== Religious architecture ====
The commune maintains a southern aspect and has remarkable heritage items including two cathedrals, an archaeological crypt under the Cathedral of Notre-Dame-du-Bourg [Our Lady of the City], the chapels (Saint Pancrace, Our Lady of Lourdes, etc.)

The Cathedral Notre-Dame-du-Bourg, an historical monument, is a Romanesque cathedral whose foundations date back to the 9th century. Victim of numerous attacks and looting, it was renovated at the beginning of the 13th century. Parts from the 11th and 12th centuries still exist. Its white marble altar is of the Merovingian era.

An archaeological crypt in the basement of the cathedral aids in the discovery of the history of Digne-les-Bains. In the crypt is the exact location of the origins of the city, attested by the presence of ancient walls from the 1st century AD. This corresponds to an urban space and implementation of three buildings of Christianity from the 5th century to the 11th century.

The Saint-Jérôme Cathedral, also an historical monument, is a Gothic cathedral from the 15th and 16th centuries. The facade is from the 19th century.

Cathedrals in Digne-les-Bains

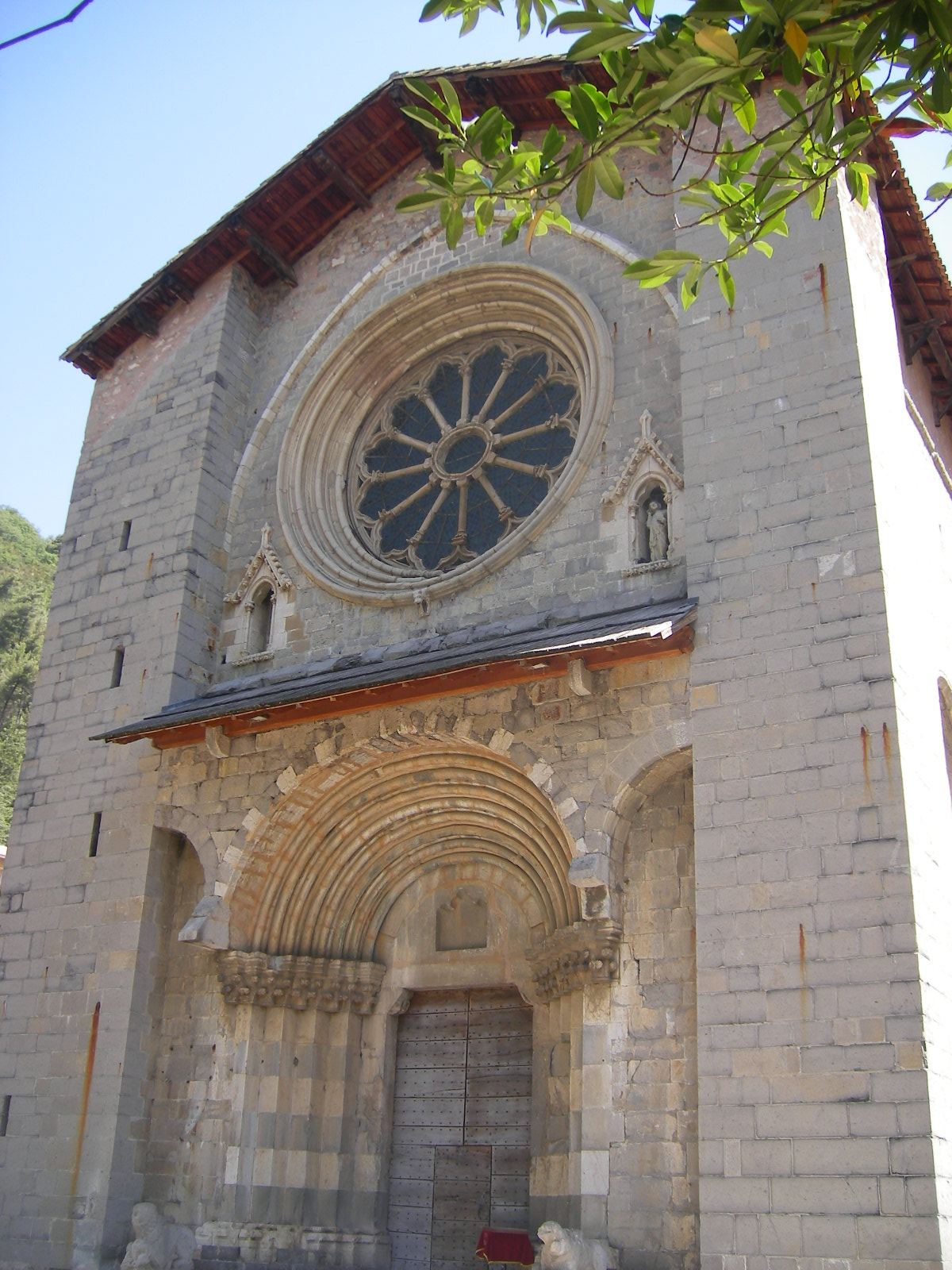
The façade of Notre-Dame-du-Bourg

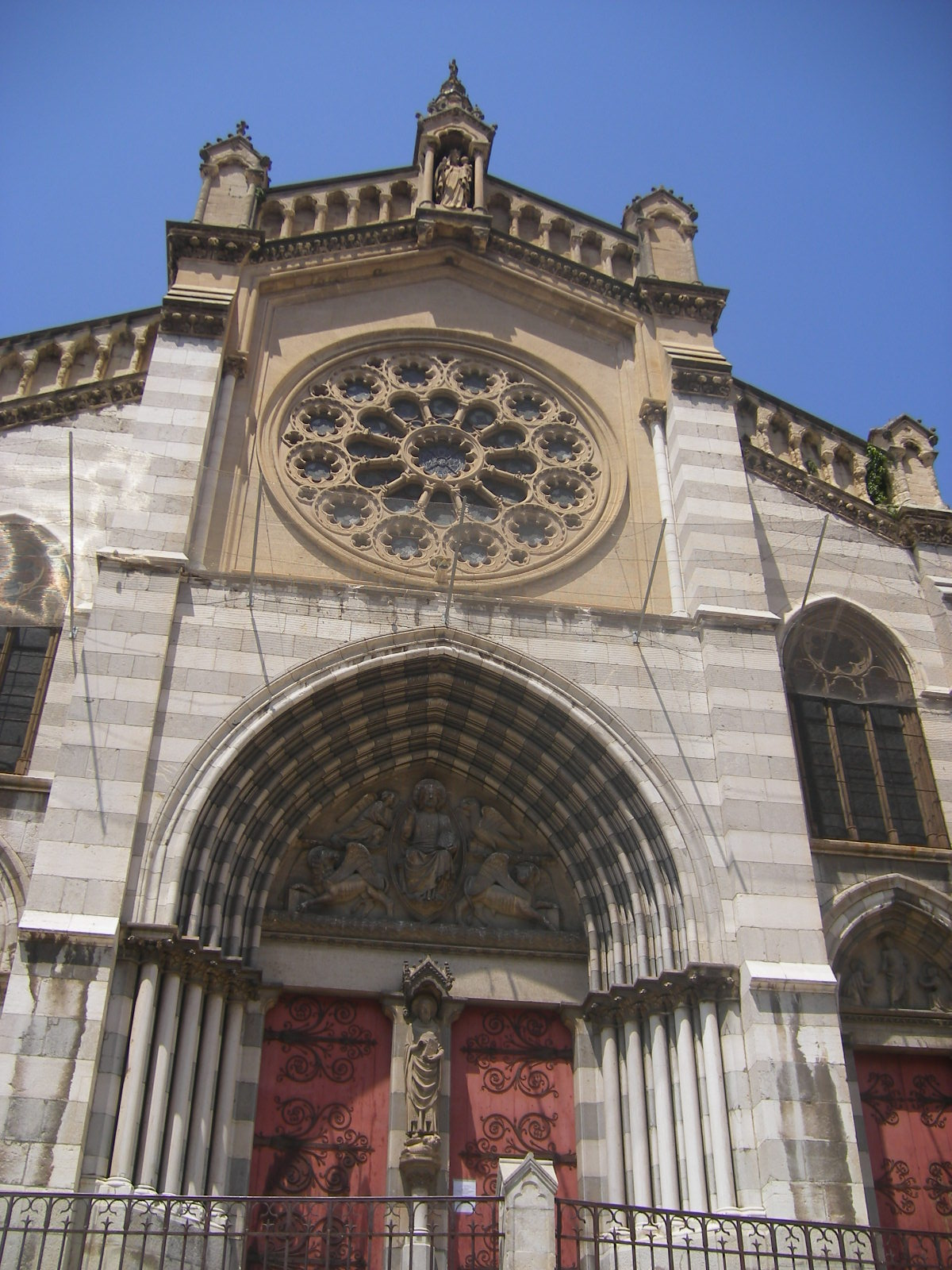
The façade of the cathedral of Saint-Jérome

Media related to Notre-Dame-du-Bourg at Wikimedia Commons
Media related to Saint-Jérôme at Wikimedia Commons

The Notre-Dame-de-Lourdes Church was built in 1870 on the Mountain of the Cross, north of Digne, though at the bottom of the slope. The brick walls are its main feature, with its large size.

The chapel of Saint-Vincent belonged to an abbey or priory. It is still in good condition. The Chapel of the Cross, located nearby, is gradually becoming a ruin.

There are numerous churches in the connected communes.

In Courbons, the parish church is Notre-Dame-des-Anges (13th-14th century). It was dedicated to St. Clair in the 17th century. Its single nave consists of three arched barrel bays, and emerges into a square choir. There is also a chapel of Saint-Pierre, south of the village, an establishment which may be very old.

The Church of Dourbes is under the name of Saint-Genest, and the oldest parts are from the 12th and 13th centuries. In Villard, the Saint-Jean-Baptiste Chapel probably dates from the 17th century.

In Gaubert, the parish church of Saint-Étienne was built in Romanesque style at the end of the 16th and 17th century. Grand-Saint-Martin farm incorporates some remains of a medieval priory. The chapel of St. Sebastian is situated on the ridge east of the village.

In Sieyès, the Church of Sainte-Marie-Madeleine remains along with the Church of Saint-Véran, between the stadium and the cemetery. A more recent chapel was built next to the town hall and school.

There are also two chapels on the mountain which overlooks the ravine of Eaux-Chaudes to the north, Saint-Pons which is in ruins, and the Chapel of Saint-Pancrace. The latter dates from the 17th century and is being restored. It has the distinction of having its bells suspended in a flat metal campanile. The pilgrimage of 12 May, when the priest blessed the sources, remained into the 1950s, and has recently resumed.

==== Civil and military architecture ====
- The remains of fortifications can be recognised if one pays attention to the plan of the old town around the central district, built on the heights. Some of the walls and some towers which surrounded the city from the 14th century can still be seen. These remains of ramparts are currently based in the landscape of the dwellings.
- Hotel Thoron de la Robine from the 17th century
- The fountain from 1829, which is an historical monument
- The sculptures. From 1983 to 1991, an annual international event of sculpture revealed international talent. Award-winning works, in Carrara marble, adorn roundabouts, squares and public gardens.

=== Culture ===
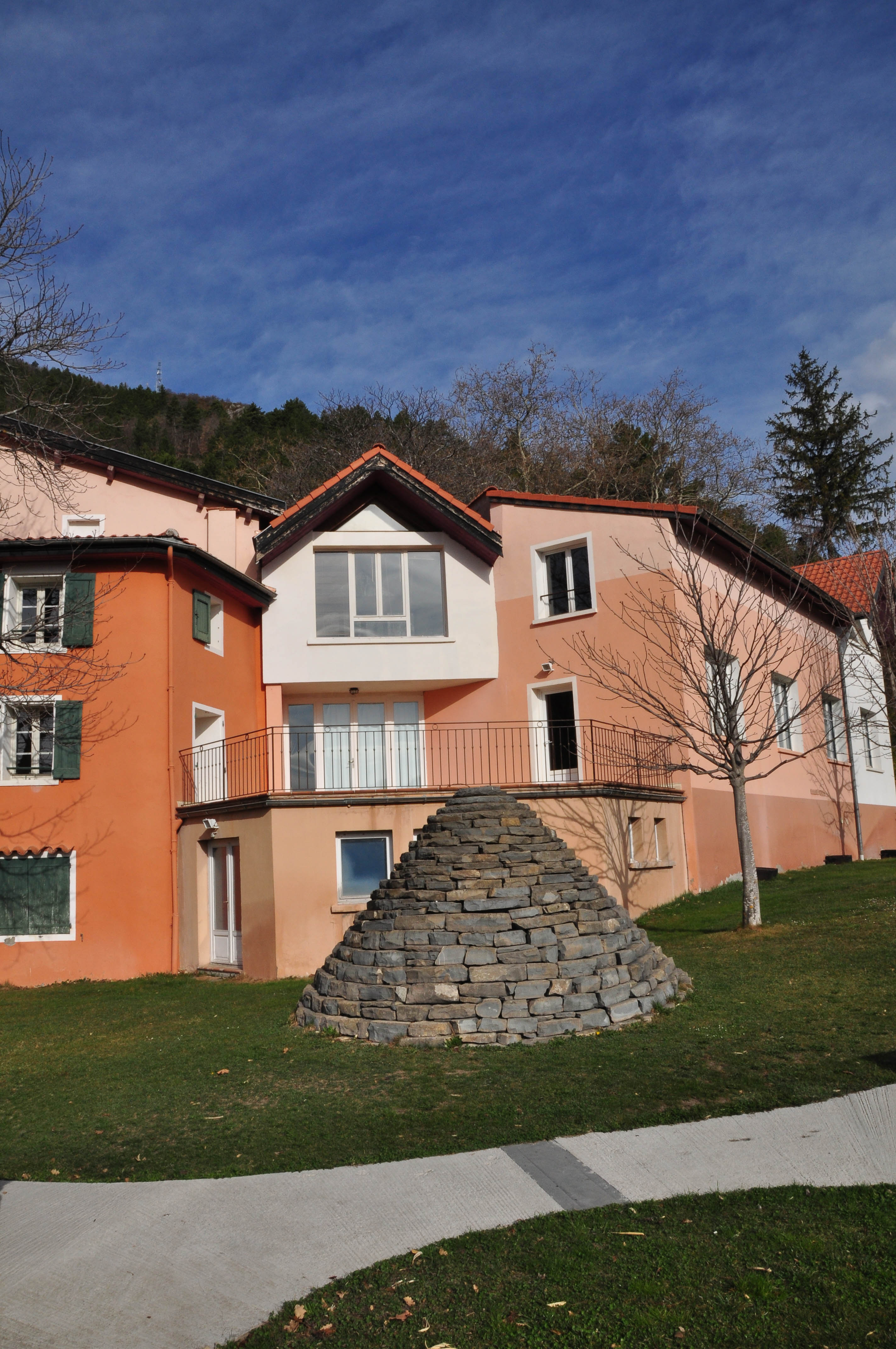
Museum of the Haute-Provence Geological Reserve in Digne

- The Museum of the Haute-Provence Geological Reserve and its butterfly garden.
- The Gassendi Museum is a modern museum enabling the public to move from art to science, and from the old to the contemporary, across a route in time. Its archaeology section was founded in 1889.
- CAIRN is an informal art of nature Research Center.
- The Museum of the Second World War contains documents and period objects evoking the strategic role of Digne in alpine defense and the damage suffered.
- Intercommunal library of the Trois Vallées
- The Museum of Alexandra David-Néel, located in her house
- The Botanic Garden of Les Cordeliers

==== Cultural references ====
- Digne is a setting for much of the first section of Victor Hugo's 1862 novel Les Misérables, where it is the home of Bishop Myriel. In early English editions, the town's name was rendered D----. The town is left unnamed in most stage and film adaptations.
- The asteroid 10088 Digne was named after the town by its discoverer, Belgian astronomer Eric Walter Elst.

=== Traditional celebrations ===
Digne celebrates lavender, a symbol of the region, in the first weekend of August, at the Corso of lavender. A funfair is installed for the occasion, and a fireworks display is organized. A parade of floats is held, including a procession consisting of a dozen floats in lavender and crepon, led by 500 musicians and dancers from various nations. The Corso draws 10–15,000 people to the town each day.

The Corso of Lavender, in August

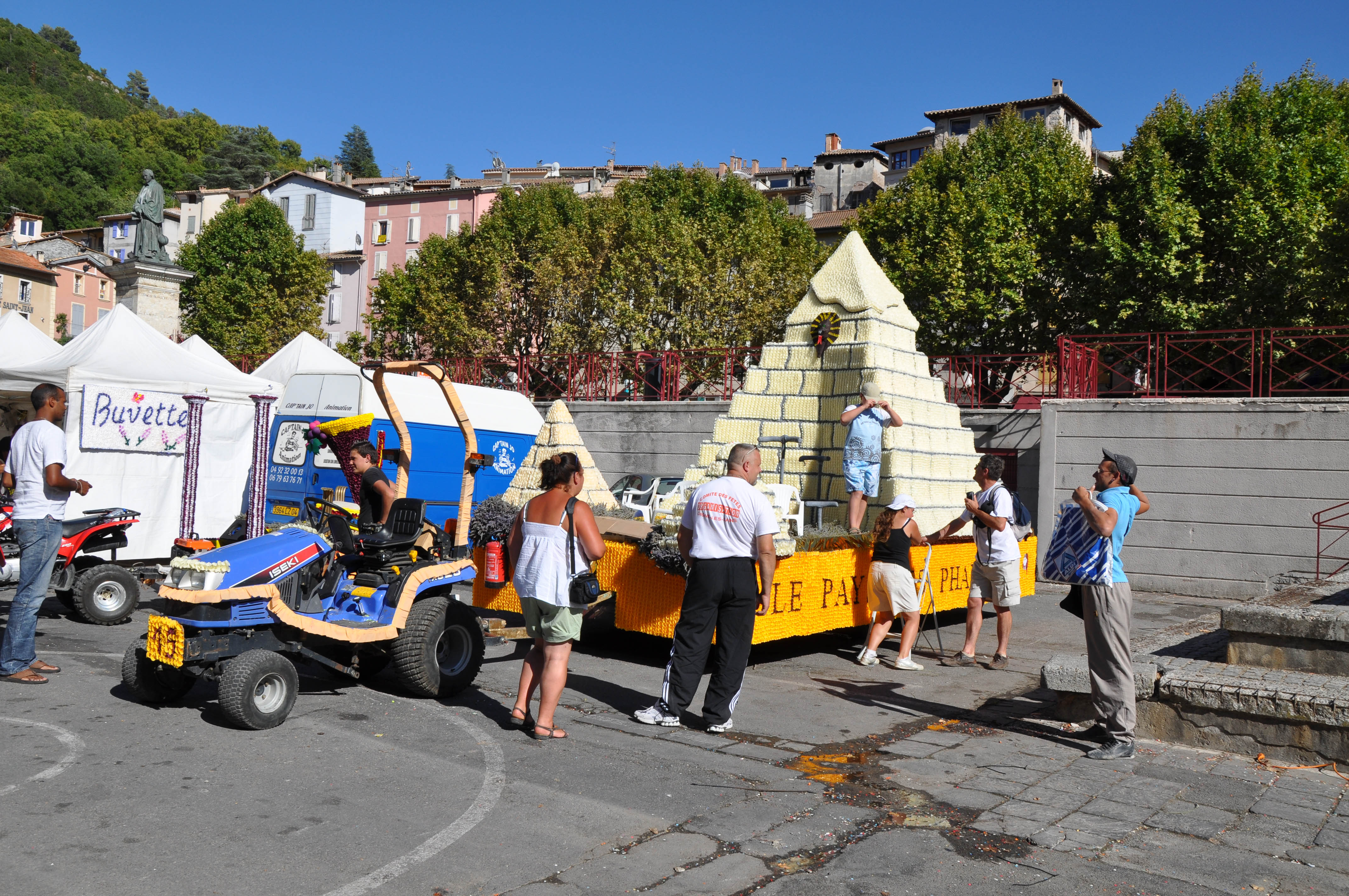
A float of lavender at the Corso in Digne

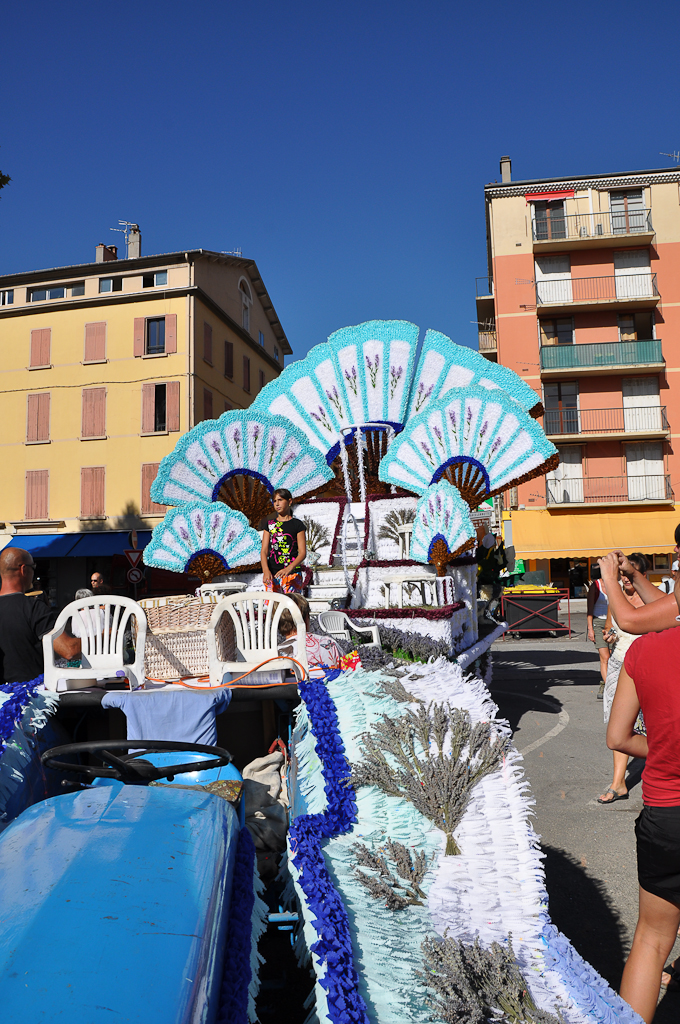
Miss Corso at the Corso of Lavender in Digne

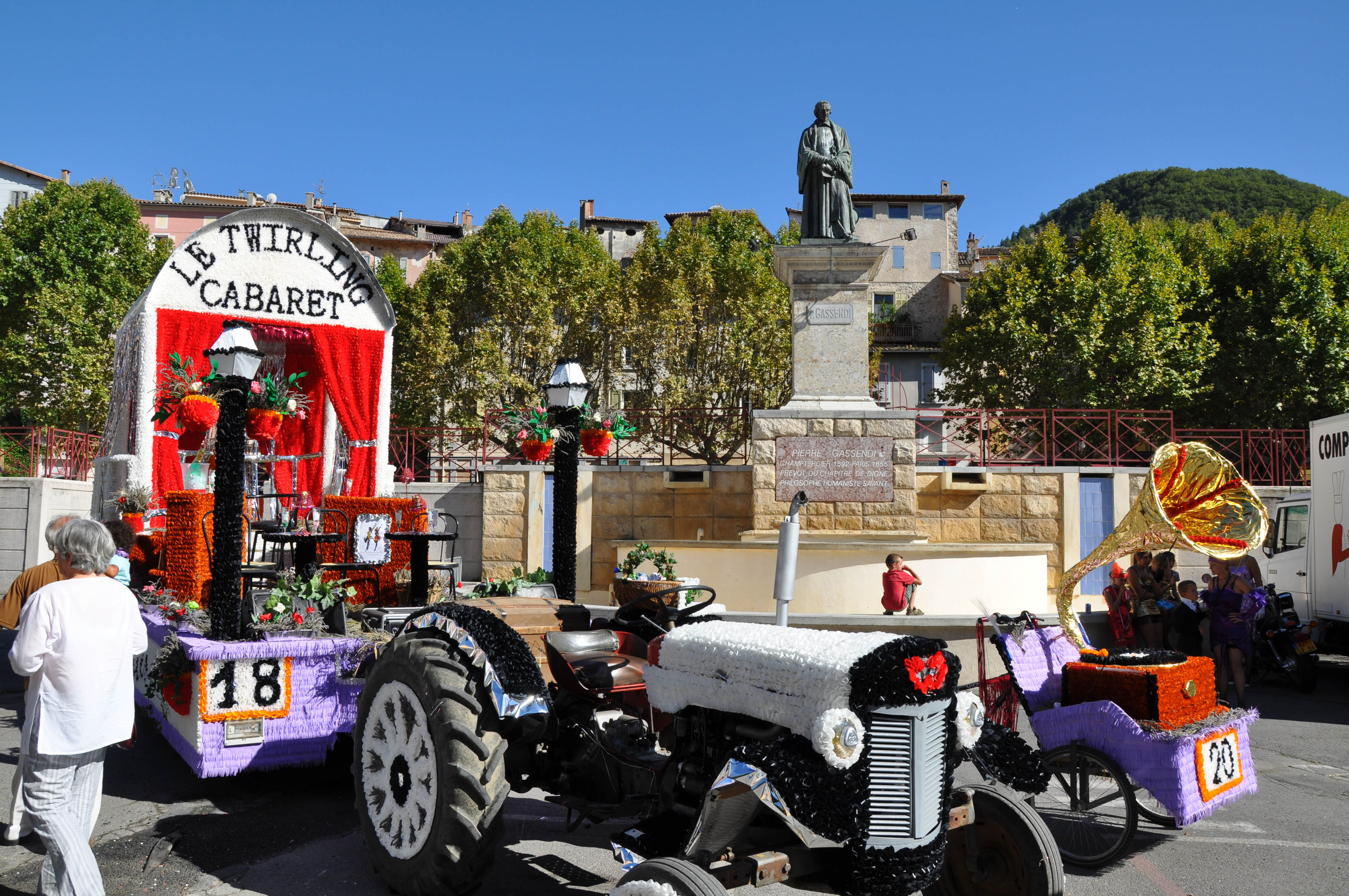
A Corso float before the statue of Gassendi in Digne

=== Arts festivals ===
In May, every year since 2002, the city has organized a festival of urban culture and music. Initiated by the Ligue de l’Enseignement des Alpes-de-Haute-Provence [League of education of Alpes-de-Haute-Provence] and the L'ADSEA. The festival is now organized by the École du sous Sol [School of the Underground] association.

The objective of this festival is to make urban culture (graffiti, slam, street basketball, hip-hop dance, skateboarding) known to a wider public along with contemporary music (rap, rock, pop, electro) through various artistic and cultural events under the program. A sports tournament closes the event. The Hip Hop dance battle and the basketball tournament are open to girls (two girls and two boys by team for the 4 vs 4 battle and at least one girl by team for the 3 vs 3 basketball tournament). An open stage is offered to amateur and semi-professional teams.

Every spring, each year, the René-Char cultural centre receives cinema personalities and projects art and test films at the Festival les Rencontres cinématographiques de Digne. Its president is Jean-Pierre Castagna.

=== Sports competitions ===
Each year since 2004, the Raid des Terres Noires [Raid of the Black Lands] mountain biking event brings together more than a thousand participants.

Raid of the Black Lands

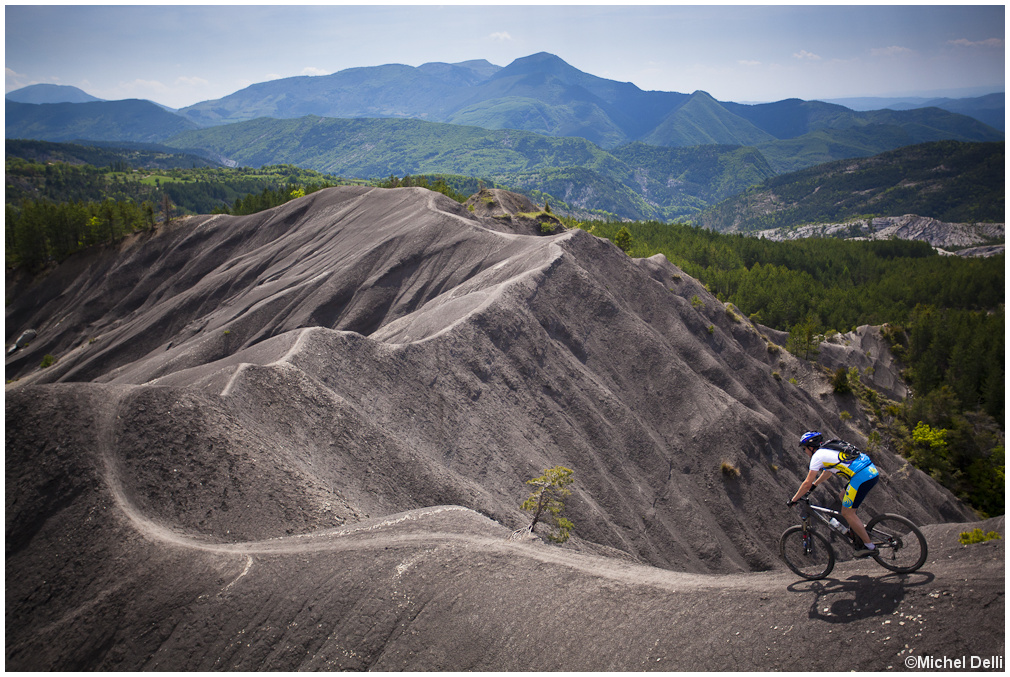
A mountain biking track along the crest of a hill

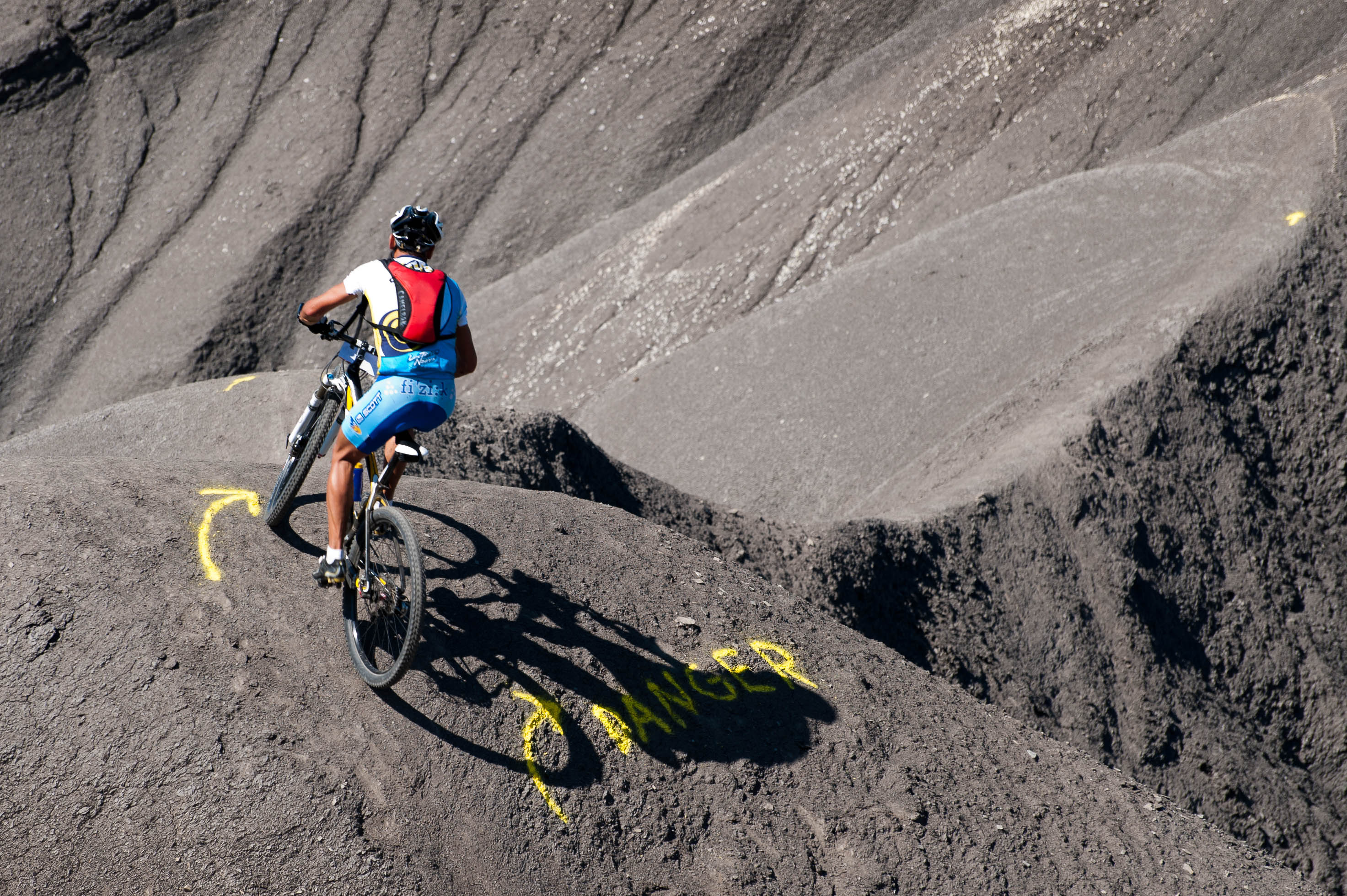
A mountain biker negotiates a tricky turn

From 2013, the VTT Rando 04 club organizes the Enduro of the Black Lands, Enduro event.

Created in 1999 by The Athletic Club of Digne, the Half-marathon of the Ammonites connects the village of Barles with the prefecture at the beginning of September, each year until 2002. Its rolling course, measured at 21.1 kilometres (13.1 mi) according to the protocols of the French Athletics Federation, goes through the popular Haute-Provence Geological Reserve. Examples of sites along the route include the clues of Barles and Péouré, the Vélodrome d’Esclangon [Velodrome of Escanglon], Voile de Facibelle [Veil of Facibelle], the Demoiselles coiffées, the Ichthyosaur, and the Dalle à ammonites.

It has been awarded two borders by the guide Le Bipède [The Biped]. It welcomed more than 1,550 runners in 4 editions. This sporting event had its a 5th edition in 2013 on the 100th anniversary of the Barles road and in favour of the National League Against Cancer, in memory of Cyril Gues, the first winner of this competition, who died in 2012.

Initiated in 2005 by the Athletic Club of Digne (one edition), the Trail of Cousson was resumed in 2008 by the Athletics Association. The race walking event offers numerous courses in the heart of the Haute-Provence geological Reserve through robines (the famous "muck"), pre-Alpine forests, villages and ascents of the bar of the Dourbes and Cousson. Free racing and animations for children as well as heritage walks are also organized parallel to sports competitions. The event also fits into an exemplary sustainable development policy which gives it national recognition.

=== Heraldry ===
Arms of Digne-les-Bains	The arms of Digne-les-Bains are: "Azure to a fleur-de-lis of Or accompanied at head by a cross of gules, at flanks with two "L" letters capitalised faced Argent and in point of a letter "D" capitalised also of Or"

These arms are not attested before the 17th century and the above composition is only one variant among many others existing. The "L" can be gold and can be replaced by silver lions. There are also versions without the golden "L" or lion: "azure to a fleur de lis of gold, accompanied at head by a cross of silver with a letter "D" of the same at the point". The latest version is "azure to a cross of gold at head and a "D" of the same at head". The cross is an evocation of the episcopal see, and the "L", perhaps, is a souvenir of a concession of Louis II of Anjou, from the beginning of the 15th century.

Gabriel Gillybœuf proposed in the early 1980s to replace the capitalised "D" with a fountain expressed in heraldic terms by "a bezant fess, wavy silver and azure" (while maintaining the cross, fleur-de-lis, and capitalised "L" respectively).

The city was jointly owned by the Counts of Provence and the Bishops of Digne. Hence the arms: The cross symbolises the bishopric, the fleur-de-lis as Charles of Anjou, Count of Provence. The letter "D" is the letter of the city. The letters "L" have been added under Louis XIV, King of France, Count of Provence and Forcalquier.

== Notable people ==
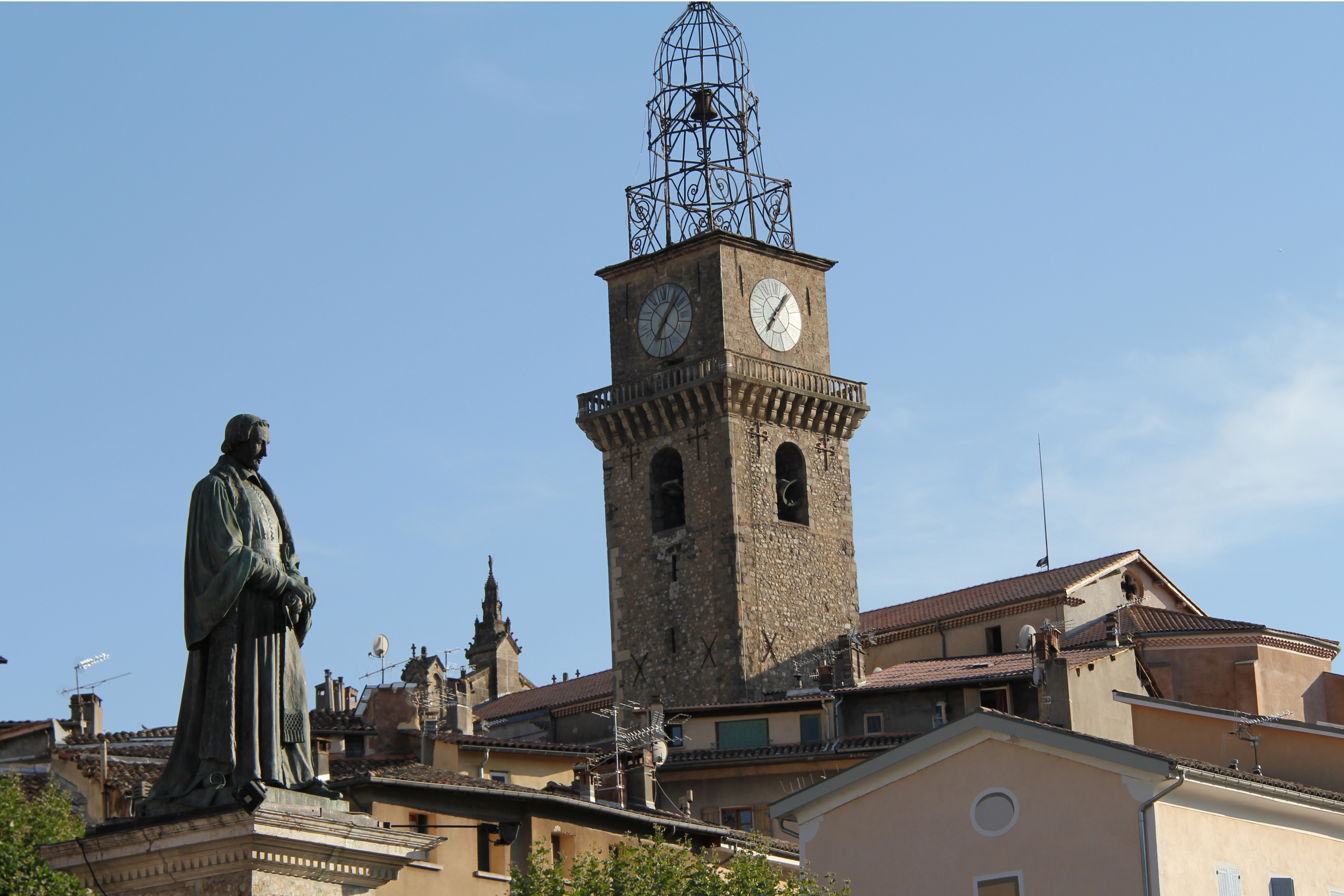
Statue of Pierre Gassendi in the square of the Cathedral of St. Jerome of Digne

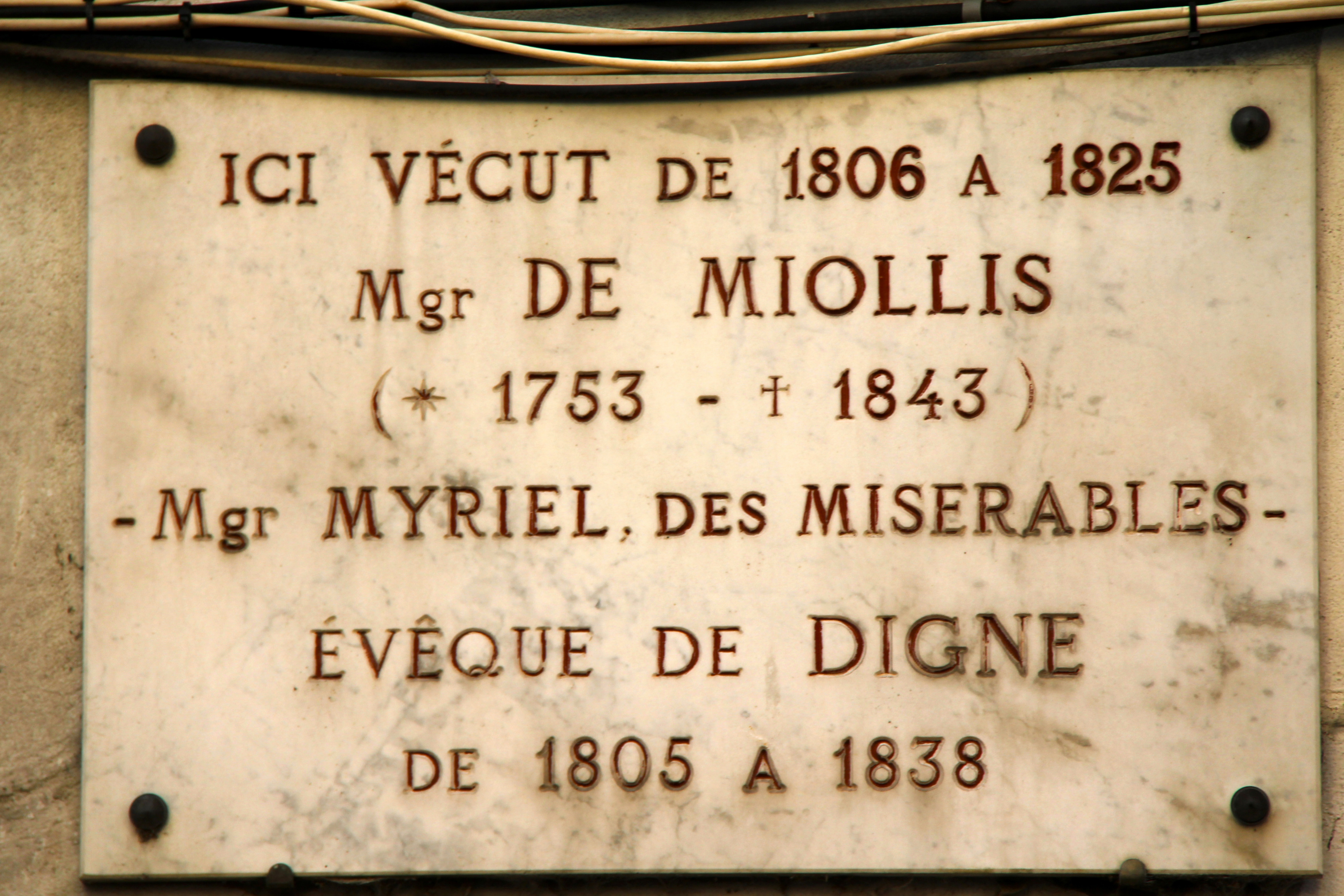
Plaque in honor of Bishop Bienvenu de Miollis

=== Public servants and religion ===
- Saints Domnin (died AD 379) and Vincent of Digne, first and second Bishops of Digne
- Douceline of Digne, (1214–1274) founded the Beguines of Marseille and devoted her life to the poor and the sick & her brother Hugh of Digne (died 1275) an ascetical writer.
- Louis Richeome (1544–1625), Jesuit theologian and controversialist
- Pierre Gassendi (1592–1655), philosopher, Catholic priest, astronomer and mathematician
- Bienvenu de Miollis, (1753–1843), Bishop of Digne 1805 to 1838, inspiration for the kind bishop in Les Misérables
- Louis Alexis Desmichels (1779–1845), cavalry general
- Hippolyte Fortoul (1811–1856), journalist, historian, Minister of Marine (1851)
- Jean-Louis Bianco (born 1943), politician, former mayor of Digne and Govt. Minister
- Later-disgraced Cardinal Jean-Pierre Ricard retired here in 2019.

=== Arts ===
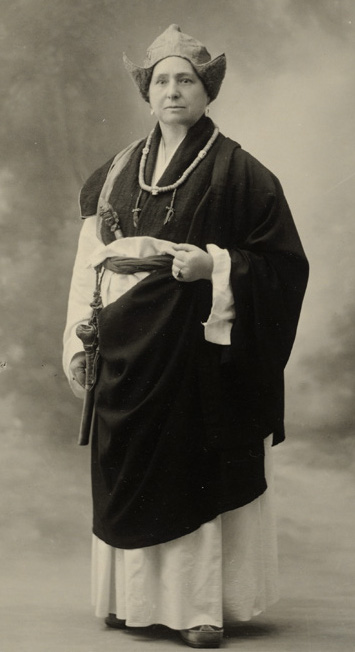
Alexandra David-Néel in Tibet in 1933

- Alexandra David-Néel (1868–1969), Belgian-French writer, spiritualist, Buddhist, anarchist and opera singer, lived in Digne from 1928
- Louis Botinelly (1883–1962), sculptor
- Jean Daviot (born 1962), contemporary artist
- Tristan Louis, (born 1971), French-American author, entrepreneur and internet activist
- Cyril Féraud (born 1985), journalist and television presenter

=== Science ===
- Alphonse Beau de Rochas (1815–1893), engineer and thermodynamician, patented the four-stroke engine in 1862
- Sébastien Point (born 1982), physicist, engineer and researcher

=== Sport ===
- Jean Milesi (born 1935), racing cyclist, rode in seven Tour de France
- Alain Boghossian (born 1970), footballer
- Mickaël Maschio (born 1973), motocross motorcyclist
- Antoine Méo (born 1984), Enduro rider
- kennyS, (born 1995), professional Counter-Strike: Global Offensive player

== See also ==
- Chemins de Fer de Provence
- Route Napoléon
- Diocese of Digne
- Communes of the Alpes-de-Haute-Provence department
- List of works by Louis Botinelly
