= Jardin botanique des Cordeliers =

Botanical garden in Provence-Alpes-Côte d'Azur, France

Coordinates: 44°05′36″N 6°14′11″E

The Jardin botanique des Cordeliers is a botanical garden located at the Place des Cordeliers, Digne-les-Bains, Alpes-de-Haute-Provence, Provence-Alpes-Côte d'Azur, France. It is open weekdays in the warmer months; admission is free.

The garden was created in 1986 within the cour d'honneur of Collège Maria Borelly, and named after its former 13th century convent site. It began as small conservatory of regional plants but in 1996 was extended to contain more than 350 plant species arranged in geometric groupings that include a collection of wild herbs, aromatic plants of the region and abroad, vegetables, and a sensory garden (created in 2005). The garden also contains a small labyrinth, sculpture, fruit trees and ornamental bushes, and flowers including dahlias and roses.

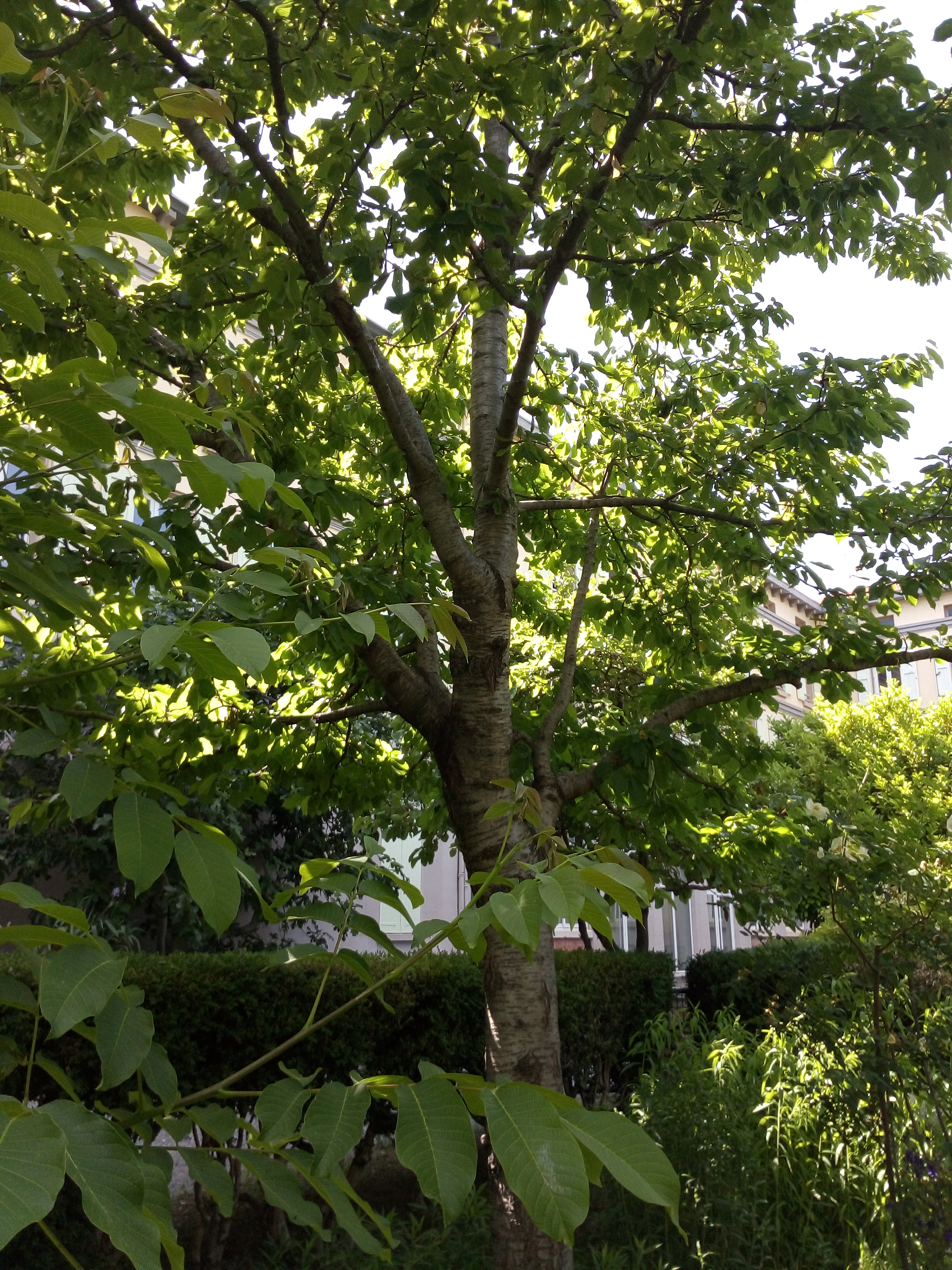
Jardin botanique des Cordeliers

== See also ==
- List of botanical gardens in France
