= Hugh of Digne =

Hugh of Digne (c. 1205 – c. 1256) was a Provençal Franciscan ascetical writer.

His close friend Salimbene refers to him in his Chronicles as "one of the most renowned clerics of the world a great preacher and in favour both among the clergy and the people; ever ready to dispute, he was possessed of a fluent speech, and a voice like that of a trumpet; he was a spiritual man ultra modum, so that on hearing him preach one would believe that he was listening to another St. Paul or another Elias." Salimbene also tells us that he was called Hugh of Bareol and that the Lombards knew him as Hugh of Montepesulano.

His sister, Douceline of Digne (c. 1215–1274), was the founder of the Beguines of Marseille.

== Life ==
Hugh was born in Digne-les-Bains, south-east France. Jean de Joinville, in his life of Louis IX (Acta Sanctorum., August, V, xxvii), records the visit of Hugh of Digne to the king. Louis endeavoured to retain him at court, but Hugh set out again on his tour of evangelization. It was while on a similar journey that he wrote to John of Parma, who was then at Greccio, prophesying in his letter, among other things, the death of the pope and of St. Bonaventure, and the extinction of the Order of the Templars.

Salimbene considers that the writings of the Abbot Joachim of Flora influenced Hugh of Digne. He certainly took an active and prominent part in the movement of the Franciscan Spirituals. This is evidenced not only from his preaching, but more particularly from his exposition of the Rule of St. Francis and from his other ascetical writings.

A biographical sketch of Hugh of Digne in Spanish which is of indifferent critical value, was published in the "Chronica Seraphica" by Damian Carnejo. He asserts that Hugh of Digne died in Marseille, where his remains now rest in the Franciscan church of that city beside those of his sister Douceline.

== Works ==
Among his works is the "Tractus de triplici via in sapientiam perveniendi", attributed to him by Bartholomew of Pisa in his "Conformities" (not to be confounded with the "Incendium Amoris" of Bonaventure, which in several codices bears a similar title). He likewise drew up a set of rules or constitutions for his sister, Douceline of Digne, and other pious women, who formed a sort of religious community known as the Dames de Roubans, with Douceline as their superior.
