= Roubaud =

Roubaud may refer to:

- Émile Roubaud (1882–1962), a French biologist, pathologist and entomologist
- Franz Roubaud (1856–1928), a Russian painter who created some of the largest panoramic paintings
- Jacques Roubaud (1932–2024), a French poet and mathematician
- Jean-Marc Roubaud (born 1951), a member of the National Assembly of France

== See also ==
- Rotbold I of Provence (died 1008), Count and Margrave of Provence
- Rotbold II of Provence (died 1014 or 1015), Count and Margrave of Provence
