= Georges Darboy =

Catholic archbishop (1813–1871)

Servant of God Georges Darboy
- Archbishop of Paris
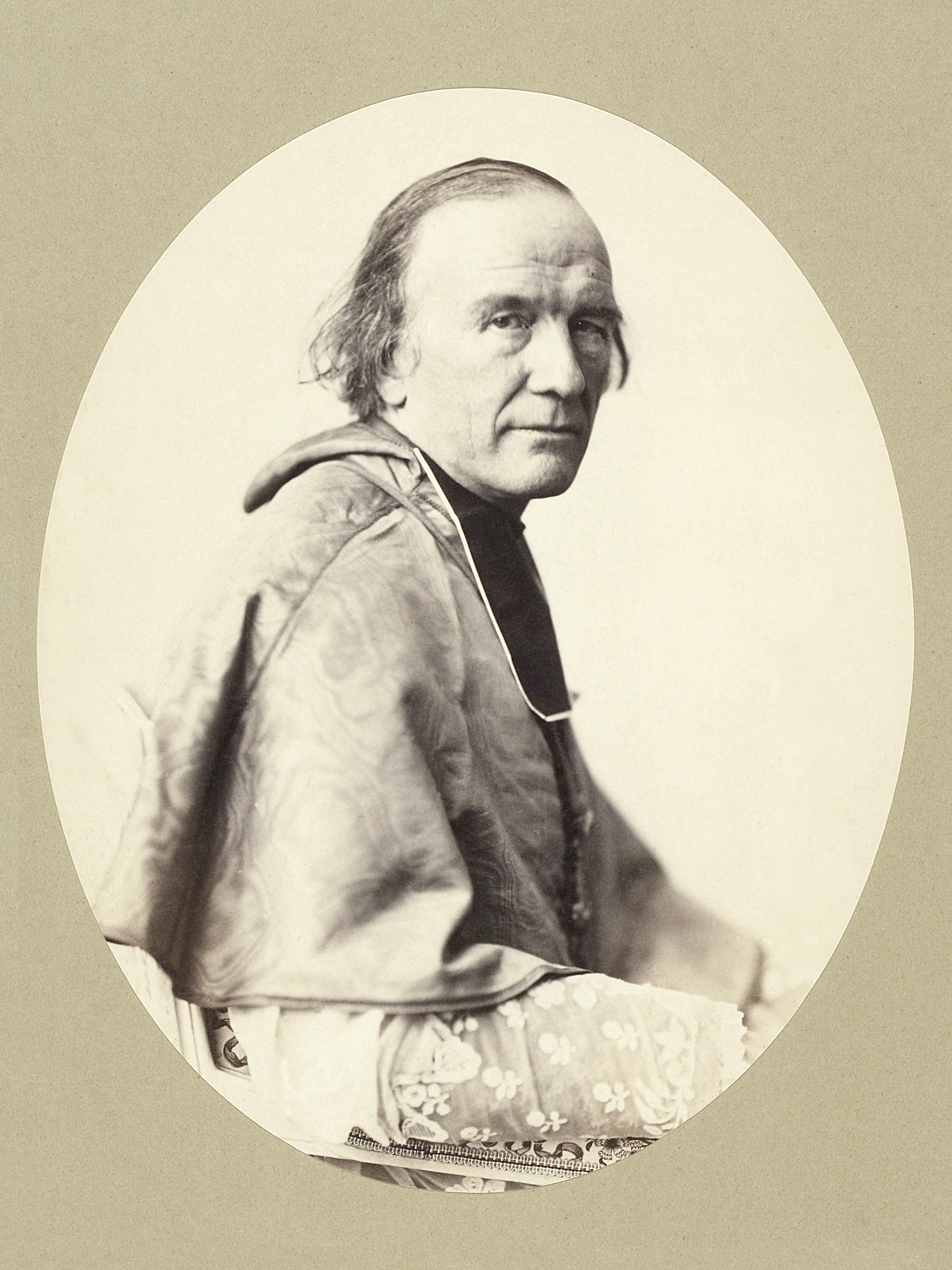
- Georges Darboy in 1865.
- See: Paris
- Installed: January 1863
- Term ended: May 1871
- Predecessor: François-Nicholas-Madeleine Morlot
- Successor: Joseph Hippolyte Guibert

Orders
- Ordination: 17 December 1836
- Consecration: 30 November 1859

Personal details
- Born: 16 January 1813 Fayl-Billot, Haute-Marne, France
- Died: 24 May 1871 (aged 58) Paris, France
- Cause of death: Execution by shooting
- Coat of arms

Georges Darboy (French: [ʒɔʁʒ daʁbwa]; 16 January 1813 – 24 May 1871) was a French Catholic prelate who served as Bishop of Nancy and later Archbishop of Paris. He was among a group of prominent hostages executed as the Paris Commune of 1871 was about to be overthrown.

== Biography ==
Darboy was born in Fayl-Billot, Haute-Marne in north-east France. He studied with distinction at the seminary at Langres, and was ordained priest in 1836. Transferred to Paris as almoner of the college of Henry IV, and honorary canon of Notre Dame, he became the close friend of Archbishop Affre and of his successor Archbishop Sibour. He was appointed bishop of Nancy in 1859, and in January 1863 was raised to the archbishopric of Paris.

Darboy was a strenuous upholder of episcopal independence in the Gallican sense, and involved himself in a controversy with Rome by his endeavours to suppress the jurisdiction of the Jesuits and other religious orders within his diocese. Pope Pius IX refused him the cardinal's hat, and rebuked him for his liberalism in a letter which was probably not intended for publication. He is also known for his opposition in 1868 to Jacques-Paul Migne, forbidding him to continue his low-cost books business after the burning of his printing establishment, and suspending him from his priestly functions. At the First Vatican Council he vigorously maintained the rights of the bishops, and strongly opposed the dogma of papal infallibility, against which he voted as inopportune. When the dogma had been finally adopted, however, he was one of the first to set the example of submission.

=== Commune and execution ===
Immediately after his return to Paris the Franco-Prussian War broke out, and his conduct during the disastrous year that followed was marked by a devoted heroism which has secured for him an enduring fame. He was active in organizing relief for the wounded at the commencement of the war, remained at his post during the siege, and refused to seek safety by flight during the brief triumph of the Paris Commune. On 4 April 1871, he was arrested by the Communards as a hostage and confined in Mazas Prison. The Communards offered to exchange him and several priests for Louis Auguste Blanqui, who was being held by the Versailles government. He was transferred to La Roquette Prisons on the advance of the Versailles army, and on 24 May he was shot within the prison along with several other prominent hostages. The execution was ordered by Théophile Ferré, who later was executed by firing squad by the French government after the fall of the Commune.

== Legacy ==
Darboy died in the attitude of blessing and uttering words of forgiveness. His body was recovered with difficulty, and, having been embalmed, was buried with imposing ceremony at public expense on 7 June. He was the third archbishop of Paris to die violently between 1848 and 1871 after Denis Auguste Affre (killed 1848) and Marie-Dominique-Auguste Sibour (assassinated in 1857).

A cause for the beatification of Darboy and the other hostages was formally opened on 16 March 1937, granting them the title of Servant of God.

== Works ==
- Œuvres de Saint Denys l'Aréopagite (1845).
- Les Femmes de la Bible (1846–1849).
- Les Saintes Femmes (1850).
- Lettres à Combalot (1851).
- Jérusalem et la Terre Sainte (1852).
- L'Imitation de Jésus-Christ (1852).
- Statistique Religieuse du Diocèse de Paris (1856).
- Saint Thomas Becket (1858).
- Du Gouvernement de Soi-même (1867).

== See also ==
- List of works by Eugène Guillaume
- Raoul Rigault

Catholic Church titles
| Preceded by François-Nicholas-Madeleine Morlot | Archbishop of Paris; 1863–1871 | Succeeded by Joseph Hippolyte Guibert |
