= Marcellinus =

Marcellinus may refer to:

== Ancient ==
- Marcellinus (consul 275), Roman imperial official
- Marcellinus (magister officiorum) (died 351), officer of Emperor Constans and of usurper Magnentius
- Marcellinus (magister militum) (died 468), a Roman general in the invasion of Africa against Geiseric
- Marcellinus (writer), author of a Life of Thucydides, 6th century
- Marcus Egnatius Marcellinus, a senator of Imperial Rome, Consul Suffectus in 116
- Marcellinus and Peter (died 304), two Christian martyrs
- Pope Marcellinus (died 304), third century pope
- Ammianus Marcellinus (c. 330–c. 400), Roman historian
- Narcissus, Argeus, and Marcellinus (died 320), martyrs at Tomi
- Marcellinus of Gaul (died 374), saint and evangelist
- Marcellinus of Carthage (died 413), saint and martyr
- Marcellinus Comes (Count Marcellinus, died 534), 6th-century chronicler

== Medieval ==
- Marcellinus (bishop of Vác) (fl. 1138–1139), Hungarian prelate

== Modern ==
- Marcellinus Champagnat (1789–1840), priest and saint, founder of the Marist Brothers
- Marcellinus of Civezza (1822–1906), Italian Franciscan author

== See also ==
- Saint Marcellinus (disambiguation)
