= Saint Marcellinus =

Saint Marcellinus may refer to:

- Pope Marcellinus (died 304), bishop of Rome 296–304 and martyr
- Marcellinus and Peter (died 304), d. 304
- Marcellinus of Carthage (died 413), secretary of state to Honorius and martyr
- Marcellinus of Gaul, feast day April 20
- See Narcissus, Argeus, and Marcellinus for Marcellinus (died 320), soldier and martyr, d. 340
- St. Marcellinus Secondary School, Mississauga, Ontario

== See also ==
- Marcellinus (disambiguation)
