= Domokos (disambiguation) =

Domokos is a town and municipality in Greece. Domokos may also refer to

- Battle of Domokos, a battle between the Ottoman Empire and Greece, part of the Greco-Turkish War (1897)
- Diocese of Domokos, an ancient bishopric based in Domokos
- Domokos (name)
- Domokos, the Hungarian name for Dămăcușeni, a village in Târgu Lăpuș town, Romania
