= Diocese of Digne =

Catholic diocese in France

Coordinates: 44°05′29″N 6°14′11″E

Diocese of Digne (–Riez–Sisteron) Dioecesis Diniensis (–Reiensis–Sistariensis) Diocèse de Digne (–Riez–Sisteron)

Catholic
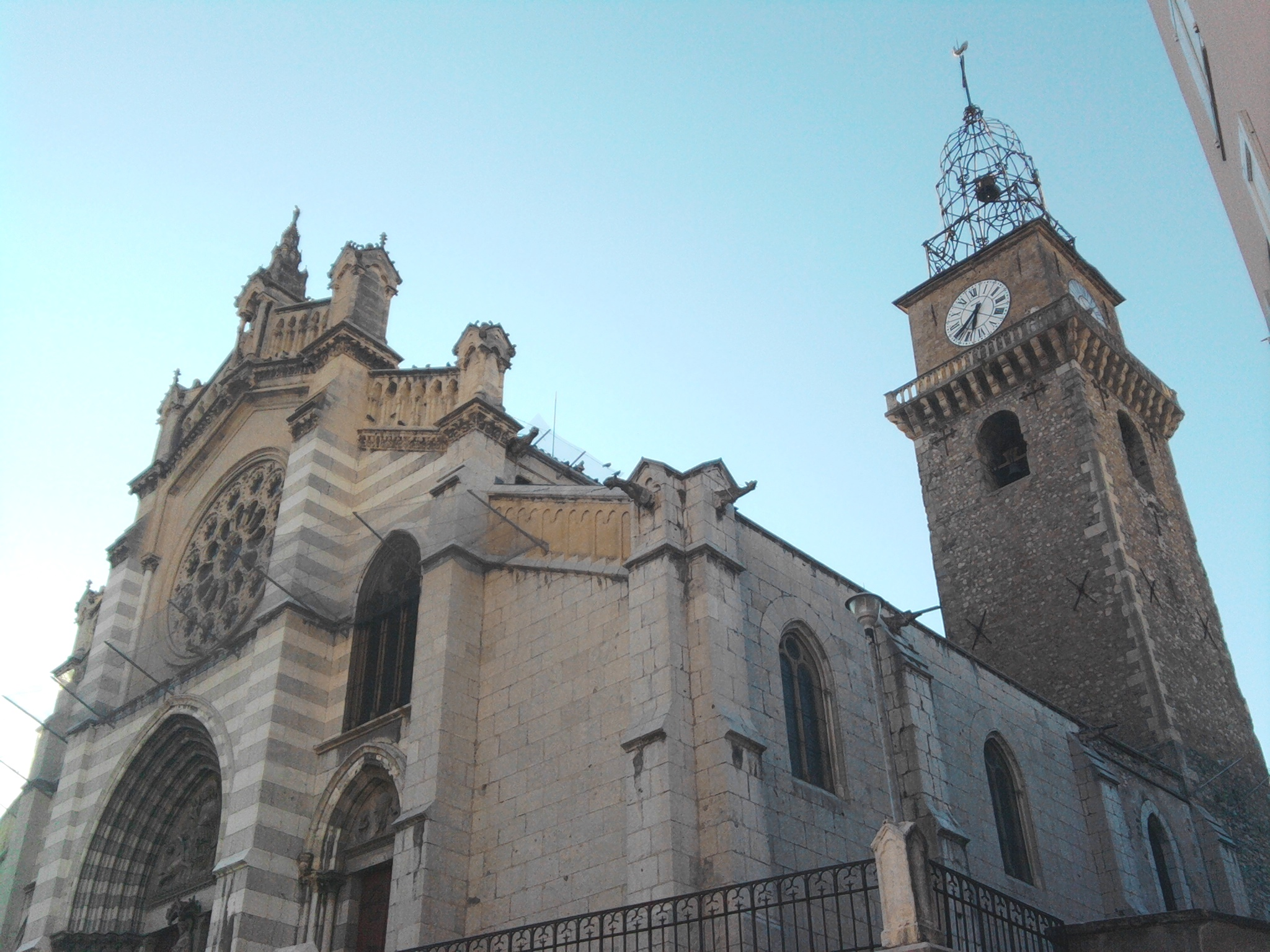
- Digne Cathedral

Location
- Country: France
- Ecclesiastical province: Marseille
- Metropolitan: Archdiocese of Marseille

Statistics
- Area: 6,986 km^{2} (2,697 sq mi)
- Population: Total; Catholics: (as of 2021); 164,000; 116,130 (70.8%)
- Parishes: 198

Information
- Denomination: Catholic Church
- Sui iuris church: Latin Church
- Rite: Roman Rite
- Established: 4th Century; United: 15 February 1916
- Cathedral: Cathedral of St. Jerome
- Patron saint: Saint Domnin; Saint Vincent of Digne
- Secular priests: 29 (diocesan); 4 (Religious Orders); 5 Permanent Deacons

Current leadership
- Pope: Leo XIV
- Bishop: Emmanuel Gobilliard
- Metropolitan Archbishop: Jean-Marc Aveline
- Bishops emeritus: François-Xavier Loizeau

Map

Website
- eglise.catholique04.fr

The Diocese of Digne (Latin: Dioecesis Diniensis; French: Diocèse de Digne) is a Latin Church ecclesiastical territory or diocese of the Catholic Church in France. Erected in the 4th century as the Diocese of Digne, the diocese has been known as the Diocese of Digne–Riez–Sisteron since 1922. The diocese comprises the entire department of Alpes-de-Haute-Provence, in the Region of Provence-Alpes-Côte d'Azur. The diocese was a suffragan diocese of the Archdiocese of Aix-en-Provence and Arles until 2002 and is now a suffragan diocese in the ecclesiastical province of the metropolitan Archdiocese of Marseille. The Bishop of Digne's cathedra is found in Digne Cathedral at the episcopal see of Digne-les-Bains.

== Extent ==
By the Concordat of 1801, this diocese was made to include the two departments of the Hautes-Alpes and the Basses-Alpes; and in addition it received the former Diocese of Digne, the Archdiocese of Embrun, the dioceses of Gap, Sisteron and Senez, a part of the dioceses of Glandèves and Riez, and fourteen parishes in the Archdiocese of Aix-en-Provence and Arles and the Diocese of Apt. In 1822 Gap was revived as an episcopal see, with its territory comprising the department of the Hautes-Alpes. The present Diocese of Digne, divested of the department of the Hautes Alpes, covers the territory formerly included in the Dioceses of Digne, Senez, Glandèves, Riez and Sisteron.

== History ==
The former diocese of Digne was evangelized by Saints Domninus and Vincentius who came from North Africa in the second half of the fourth century with Saint Marcellinus, the Apostle of Embrun. There is no evidence, however, that they were bishops. The first historically known bishop was Pentadius who attended the Council of Agde in 506.

=== Cathedral ===
The original cathedral of Digne (Cathédrale Notre-Dame-du-Bourg de Digne) was in Bourg, the city of Digne and the Bourg being two separate legal entities. The earliest architectural remains on the site where the cathedral now stands consist of a wall of Gallo-Roman construction, which local authorities and amateurs would like to push back to the time of Constantine, or at least, as Canon J.-F. Cruvellier admits, to the Constantinian era. It would be completely improper, however, to call this church a cathedral, since it cannot be shown that there was a bishop in Digne until after 500. The second church, as was first asserted by Honoré Bouche, was traditionally believed to have been built or rebuilt by Charlemagne. He made the same claim for the cathedrals of Avignon, Embrun, Seine, Senez, and Glandèves. In 1479, when the Chapter of Digne was attempting to persuade Pope Sixtus IV to grant them the Priory of Saint-Pierre d'Albéra, they impressed him by claiming that their church had been founded and endowed by Charlemagne himself.

In a bull of 1180 (or 1184), addressed to Ugo the Provost and the Canons of S. Maria Dignensis, in which Pope Alexander III takes the Church of Digne under papal protection, the first notation is Burgum Dinense, in quo ecclesia vestra constitit ('Bourg, in which your church is situated'). Jurisdiction over the Bourg belonged to the Provost from 1280, by way of a grant of Count Raymond Berenguer IV of Provence.

On 26 July 1397, during the episcopate of Nicholas de Corbières, the Cathedral of Notre-Dame, which had been rebuilt, and consecrated in 1330, and the church of the convent of the Franciscans were burned. The fires were deliberately set, apparently by bands of Vicomte Raymond de Turenne.

Notre-Dame du Bourg was attacked again, sacked, and consigned to the flames in 1560 by the Huguenots. They returned and wreaked more destruction in 1562, 1568, 1574, and 1591. In 1591 the Duc de Lesdiguières, who had just successfully reduced the Dauphiné to obedience to Henri IV and captured Grenoble, was appealed to by the Duc de la Valette, Governor of Provence, to help him against the forces of the League, who were being supported by the Duke of Savoy. In April 1591, Lesdiguières won the Battle of Esperron, and then in October he appeared before Digne. He directed his cannon first against the monastery of Saint-Vincent, which was being fortified and defended by the forces of the League, and then against the Cathedral of Notre-Dame, which received 54 volleys. The Leaguers capitulated and were allowed to withdraw. They left behind a huge cache of gunpowder in the crypt, however, and, in the removal of those supplies in 1593, further damage was done to tombs and burials. Luckily Notre-Dame du Bourg was not put up for sale or destruction in the confiscations of 1793. Later it was classed as an historical monument, second class, and survived. The episcopal palace was not so lucky. The wars of religion had done such damage that the new bishop, Antoine de Bologne, was not able to reside there when he arrived in Digne in March 1602, but had to live in rented quarters until a new building could be erected.

The Basilica of Saint-Jerôme, which served as a cathedral after the Huguenot devastations of the 16th century, had its foundations begun by Bishop Antoine Guiramand in 1490. He chose a site in the citadel, next to the fortifications. Notre-Dame du Bourg continues to be the cathedral down to the present time, and episcopal functions are regularly held there. A priest and a deacon were ordained in the cathedral on 18 June 2017.

==== Chapter ====
In the medieval period the Cathedral Chapter of Digne was composed of a Provost and thirteen Canons, among whom were the Archdeacon, the Sacristan, and the Precentor. The earliest known Provost was Guillaume de Benevento in 1175. In 1669 it was composed of four dignities (dignités, not 'dignitaries') and nineteen canons. In 1742 there were three dignities and ten canons. In the mid-nineteenth century, the Chapter was composed of the two Archdeacons (who were Vicars General of the diocese) and nine titular Canons; there were also thirty honorary Canons, of whom ten had to be from the diocese.

=== Plague ===
In 1629 all of Provence was struck by a visitation of the (bubonic) plague. Fears of an invasion had already been aroused in 1628, and the Parliament of Aix issued orders to every commune in Provence to be on watch and to establish a bureau of sanitation in its area. On 10 September 1628 Digne complied and established its bureau of ten members; it also ordered the Consuls of Digne to secure the highways. The plague made its appearance in Digne by the first week in June. From 5 October 1629 to 21 March 1630 the inhabitants were quarantined inside the city. Plague returned at the beginning of June 1631, lasting through the middle of November. In July it struck the convent of the Récollets. An infirmary was set up in the convent of the Franciscans (Cordelliers), though this order was countermanded, so that the chapel could remain in service. The shortage of priests was such that the church of Saint-Jérôme had no clergy at all. The convent and church of the Observant Franciscans were closed. Only the chapel of the Récollets continued to hold services. Pierre Gassendi, who was Provost of the Cathedral Chapter of Digne from 1634 to 1655, reported that, at Digne, before the plague there were some ten thousand inhabitants, but that afterwards only fifteen hundred remained. A generation later, in 1669, the numbers had recovered only to around six thousand persons.

In 1652 the Jesuits established a collège for the education of the youth of Digne.

=== Revolution ===
In 1790 the National Constituent Assembly decided to bring the French church under the control of the State. Civil government of the provinces was to be reorganized into new units called 'départements', originally intended to be 83 or 84 in number. The dioceses of the Roman Catholic Church were to be reduced in number, to coincide as much as possible with the new departments. Since there were more than 130 bishoprics at the time of the Revolution, more than fifty dioceses needed to be suppressed and their territories consolidated. Clergy would need to take an oath of allegiance to the State and its Constitution, specified by the Civil Constitution of the Clergy, and they would become salaried officials of the State. Both bishops and priests would be elected by special 'electors' in each department. This meant schism, since bishops would no longer need to be approved (preconised) by the Papacy; the transfer of bishops, likewise, which had formerly been the exclusive prerogative of the pope in canon law, would be the privilege of the State; the election of bishops no longer lay with the Cathedral Chapters (which were all abolished), or other responsible clergy, or the Pope, but with electors who did not even have to be Catholics or Christians. All monasteries, convents and religious orders in France were dissolved, and their members were released from their vows by order of the National Constituent Assembly (which was uncanonical); their property was confiscated "for the public good", and sold to pay the bills of the French government. Cathedral Chapters were also dissolved.

Bishops who refused to take the oath to the Constitution were considered to have resigned their posts. Bishop François du Mouchet de Villedieu was one of the non-jurors, and consequently a new election was ordered by the Legislative Assembly. The diocese of Digne had been suppressed by the Civil Constitution and its territory had been merged into the new diocese of Basses-Alpes. The Electors met at Digne on 20 March 1791, and on the third ballot elected the Curé of Valensole, Jean-Baptiste-Romé de Villeneuve as the bishop of Basses-Alpes. The legitimate bishop de Villedieu sent the usurper two letters, but Villeneuve accepted the position and was consecrated at Nîmes by Constitutional Bishop Charles-Benoît Roux. The consecration was valid, but illicit, schismatic, and blasphemous. During the Terror he was ordered to resign his priestly offices, but he refused and spent thirteen months in prison in Digne; he was released only on 9 November 1794. But he returned to desolation. Reason had officially supplanted Religion in France, and the former churches were Temples of Reason. When Religion was restored in 1795, the Constitutional Church revived, except at Manosque and in the countryside, where it was the Roman Church or nothing. In 1798, under orders, he named and consecrated Constitutional bishops for Vaucluse and Bouches-du-Rhone. But he fell ill and died completely unrepentant on 23 December 1798.

Villeneuve was succeeded by his Vicar General, André Champsaud, former Curé of the Cathedral of Digne. He had been imprisoned with Villeneuve in 1793–1794, and had administered the diocese in 1795 on behalf of Villeneuve, who was ill. He was consecrated a bishop at Aix on 5 May 1799 by Constitutional bishop Jean-Baptiste-Siméon Aubert, and resigned in 1801. Champsaud solemnly retracted his errors in 1811, and died on 26 July 1826.

=== Under the Concordat of 1801 ===
After the signing of the Concordat of 1801 with First Consul Napoleon Bonaparte, Pope Pius VII demanded the resignation of all bishops in France, in order to leave no doubt as to who was a legitimate bishop and who was a Constitutional imposter. He then immediately abolished all of the dioceses in France, for the same reason. Then he began to restore the old Ancien Régime dioceses, or most of them, though not with the same boundaries as before the Revolution. The diocese of Digne was revived by Pope Pius VII in his bull Qui Christi Domini of 29 November 1801. Through the influence of General Jean-Joseph Dessole (Dessolles), his uncle was nominated bishop of the restored diocese of Digne by First Consul Napoleon Bonaparte on 29 April 1802, and preconised (approved) by Pope Pius VII on 6 May. He was consecrated in Paris on 11 July by the Bishop of Vannes.

=== Twentieth century ===
During the First World War, the diocese of Digne sent 130 of its clergy for mobilisation. Nine priests and three seminarians died in the conflict. Twelve were decorated with the Croix de guerre.

== List of Bishops ==
=== to 1000 ===
[365: Domninus]
[380: Vincent]
[c. 439–c. 455: Nectarius]
[Memorialis]

- 506: Pentadius

[524–527: Porcianus]

- c. 549–c. 554: Hilarius
- 573–585: Heraclius

[614: Maximus]

- 650: Agapius (Agape) or Bobo (Bobon)
- 798: Raganbaldus
- 899: Bledericus

=== 1000 to 1300 ===
- 1025: Eminus
- c. 1028–c. 1038: Bernardus (I.)
- 1038–c. 1068: Hugo (I.)

[1070: Laugier]

- 1146: Gui
- c. 1150 (?): Pierre (I.) Hesmido
- Hugo (II.) de Vars
- Hugo (III.)
- Pierre (II.) de Droilla
- 1179: Guillaume (I.) de Bénévent
- c. 1184/1185 — 1190 (?): Guigue de Revel, O.S.B.
- c. 1192 – c. 1196: Bertrand (I.) de Turriers
- 1206: Ismido
- 1209: Gualo (Walon) de Dampierre
- 1211 – 5 October 1232: L(antelmus)
- 1233 – 1242?: Hugues (IV.) de Laudun
- 1247–1248: Amblard
- 1248 – 25 May 1278: Bonifatius
- 1289–c. 1295: Guillaume (II.) de Porcellet, O.Min.
- (c. 1297 – after August 1299) Hugo

=== 1300 to 1600 ===
- c. 1302–c. 1318: Renaud de Porcelet
- 1318–1323?: Armandus
- 1324–1327: Guillaume (III.) de Sabran
- 1327 – 7 October 1341: Elzéar de Villeneuve
- 1341–1361: Jean (I.) Peissoni
- 1362 – c. 1385 ?: Bertrand (II.) de Seguret
- 1386 – 5 March 1406: Nicolas de Corbières
- 1406–1432: Bertrandus (III.) Radulphi, O.Min.
- 1432–1439: Pierre (III.) de Verceil (Versailles), O.S.B.
- 1439–1445: Guillaume d'Estouteville
- 1445 – 22 July 1466: Pierre (IV.) Turelure, O.P.
- 26 September 1466 – August 1479: Conrad de La Croix
- c. 1479 – c. 1513: Antoine de Guiramand
- 1513–1536: François de Guiramand
- 1536–1545: Chérubin d'Orsière
- 1546 – c. 1552: Antoine Olivier
- 1552–1568: Antoine Hérouet
- 1568–1587: Henri Le Meignen
- 1587–1602: Claude Coquelet

=== 1600 to 1800 ===
- 1602–1615: Antoine (IV.) de Bologne
- 1615–1628: Louis (I.) de Bologne
- 1628–1664: Raphaël de Bologne
- 1664–1668: Toussaint de Forbin-Janson
- 1668–1669: Jean-Armand de Rotondis de Biscarras
- 1669–1675: Jean (II.) de Vintimille du Luc
- 1675–1678: Henri (II.) Félix de Tassy
- 1678–1708: François (II.) Le Tellier
- 1708–1728: Henri de Pujet
- 1730–1741: Antoine Amable de Feydeau, O.Carm.

[1742: Paul de Ribeyre]

- 1742–1746: Jean-Louis du Lau
- 1747–1758: Louis Sextius de Jarente de La Bruyère
- 1758–1784: Pierre-Paul du Queylar
- 1784–1790: François du Mouchet de Villedieu
  - Jean-Baptiste-Romé de Villeneuve (Constitutional bishop of Basses-Alpes) (1791–1798)
  - André Champsaud (Constitutional bishop of Basses-Alpes) (1798–1801)

=== since 1802 ===
- Irénée-Yves Desolle (Dessole) 1802–1805
- François-Melchior-Charles-Bienvenu de Miollis 1805–1838
- Marie-Dominique-Auguste Sibour 1840–1848
- Marie-Julien Meirieu 1848–1880
- Louis-Joseph-Marie-Ange Vigne 1880–1885
- Alfred-François Fleury-Hottot 1885–1887
- Henri-Abel Mortier 1887–1889
- Pierre-Paul Servonnet 1889–1897
- Jean Hazera 1897–1905
- Dominique Castellan 1906–1915
- Léon-Adolphe Lenfant 1915–1917
- Jean-Joseph-Benoît-Marie Martel 1917–1923
- Cosme-Benjamin Jorcin 1923–1958
- René-Fernand-Bernardin Collin, O.F.M. 1958–1980
- Edmond-Marie-Henri Abelé 1980–1987
- Georges-Paul Pontier 1988–1996 (appointed Bishop of La Rochelle)
- François-Xavier Jacques Marie Loizeau 1997–2014
- Jean-Philippe Nault 2015–2022 (appointed Bishop of Nice)
- Emmanuel Gobilliard 2022–present

== See also ==
- Catholic Church in France
- Les Miserables — the bishop Myriel of Hugo’s novel is the bishop of Digne and was loosely based on Bienvenu de Miollis , the bishop of the same seat from 1805 through 1838

== Bibliography ==
=== Reference works ===
- Gams, Pius Bonifatius (1873). Series episcoporum Ecclesiae catholicae: quotquot innotuerunt a beato Petro apostolo. Ratisbon: Typis et Sumptibus Georgii Josephi Manz. (Use with caution; obsolete)
- Eubel, Conradus, ed. (1913). Hierarchia catholica, Tomus 1 (second ed.). Münster: Libreria Regensbergiana. (in Latin)
- Eubel, Conradus, ed. (1914). Hierarchia catholica, Tomus 2 (second ed.). Münster: Libreria Regensbergiana. (in Latin)
- Eubel, Conradus; Gulik, Guilelmus, eds. (1923). Hierarchia catholica, Tomus 3 (second ed.). Münster: Libreria Regensbergiana.
- Gauchat, Patritius (Patrice) (1935). Hierarchia catholica IV (1592-1667). Münster: Libraria Regensbergiana.
- Ritzler, Remigius; Sefrin, Pirminus (1952). Hierarchia catholica medii et recentis aevi V (1667-1730). Patavii: Messagero di S. Antonio.
- Ritzler, Remigius; Sefrin, Pirminus (1958). Hierarchia catholica medii et recentis aevi VI (1730-1799). Patavii: Messagero di S. Antonio.
- Ritzler, Remigius; Sefrin, Pirminus (1968). Hierarchia Catholica medii et recentioris aevi sive summorum pontificum, S. R. E. cardinalium, ecclesiarum antistitum series... A pontificatu Pii PP. VII (1800) usque ad pontificatum Gregorii PP. XVI (1846) (in Latin). Vol. VII. Monasterii: Libr. Regensburgiana.
- Ritzler, Remigius; Pirminus Sefrin (1978). Hierarchia catholica Medii et recentioris aevi... A Pontificatu PII PP. IX (1846) usque ad Pontificatum Leonis PP. XIII (1903) (in Latin). Vol. VIII. Il Messaggero di S. Antonio.
- Pięta, Zenon (2002). Hierarchia catholica medii et recentioris aevi... A pontificatu Pii PP. X (1903) usque ad pontificatum Benedictii PP. XV (1922) (in Latin). Vol. IX. Padua: Messagero di San Antonio. ISBN 978-88-250-1000-8.

=== Studies ===
- Cruvellier, J.-F. (Canon) (1883) "Notice sur l'église de Notre-Dame du Bourg à Digne, ancienne cathedrale de Digne," Bulletin d'histoire ecclésiastique et d'archéologie religieuse des diocéses de Valence, Digne, Gap, Grenoble et Viviers (in French) (3 ed.). 1883. 3 (1882-3) 149-152, 188-198, 245-248, 291-295; 4 (1883), 75-82, 116-120, 205-212, 250-251, 289-293; 5 (1884), 188-200, 248-262, 408-416.
- Duchesne, Louis (1907). Fastes épiscopaux de l'ancienne Gaule: I. Provinces du Sud-Est. Paris: Fontemoing. pp. 292–293. second edition (in French)
- Du Tems, Hugues (1774). Le clergé de France, ou tableau historique et chronologique des archevêques, évêques, abbés, abbesses et chefs des chapitres principaux du royaume, depuis la fondation des églises jusqu'à nos jours (in French). Vol. Tome premier. Paris: Delalain.
- Fisquet, Honoré (1864). La France pontificale: Metropole d'Aix: Digne, 1re partie: Digne et Riez (Paris: Étienne Repos 1864).
- Guichard, Firmin (1844). Essai sur l'histoire de Digne pendent les troubles de la Ligue. Digne: Mme. V. A. Guichard. (in French)
- Guichard, Firmin (1846). Essai historique sur le Cominalat dans la ville de Digne: institution minicipale provencale des XIIIe et XIVe siecles (in French). Vol. Tome I. Digne: Mme. V. A. Guichard.
- Guichard, Firmin (1846). Essai historique sur le Cominalat dans la ville de Digne: institution minicipale provencale des XIIIe et XIVe siecles (in French). Vol. Tome II. Digne: Mme. V. A. Guichard.
- Guichard, Firmin (1845). Essai sur l'histoire de Digne pendant la peste de 1629 Digne: Mme. V. A. Guichard. (in French)
- Gassendi, Pierre (1654). Notitia ecclesiae Diniensis (in Latin). Paris: Mathurinus Dupuis.
- Gassendi, Pierre (1845). Notice sur l'église de Digne (in French). Digne: Guichard.
- Isnard, Émile (1915). Essai historique sur le chapitre de Digne et sur Pierre Gassendi, ... Digne:Imprimerie Chaspoul. {HathiTrust: read on-line]
- Jean, Armand (1891). Les évêques et les archevêques de France depuis 1682 jusqu'à 1801 (in French). Paris: A. Picard.
- Pisani, Paul (1907). Répertoire biographique de l'épiscopat constitutionnel (1791-1802) (in French). Paris: A. Picard et fils.
- Sainte-Marthe, Denis de (1725). Gallia Christiana: In Provincias Ecclesiasticas DistributaL Provinciae Cameracensis, Coloniensis, Ebredunensis (in Latin). Vol. Tomus tertius (3). Paris: Typographia Regia. pp. 1108–1144.
- Société bibliographique (France) (1907). L'épiscopat français depuis le Concordat jusqu'à la Séparation (1802-1905). Paris: Librairie des Saints-Pères.
