= Piazza Virgiliana, Mantua =

Square in Mantua, Italy

Coordinates: 45.1628°N 10.7950°E

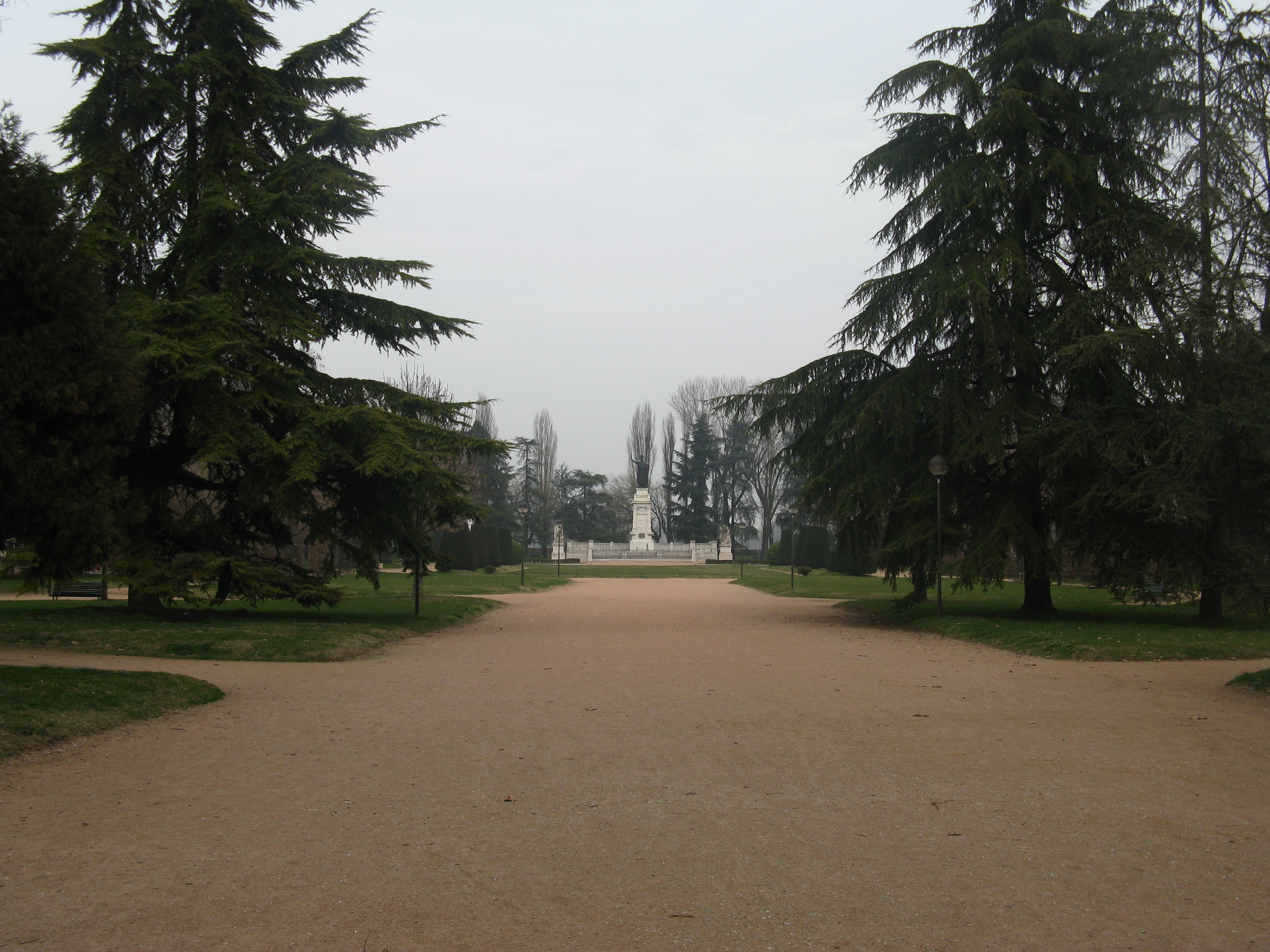
View of the Piazza from the Southeast end.

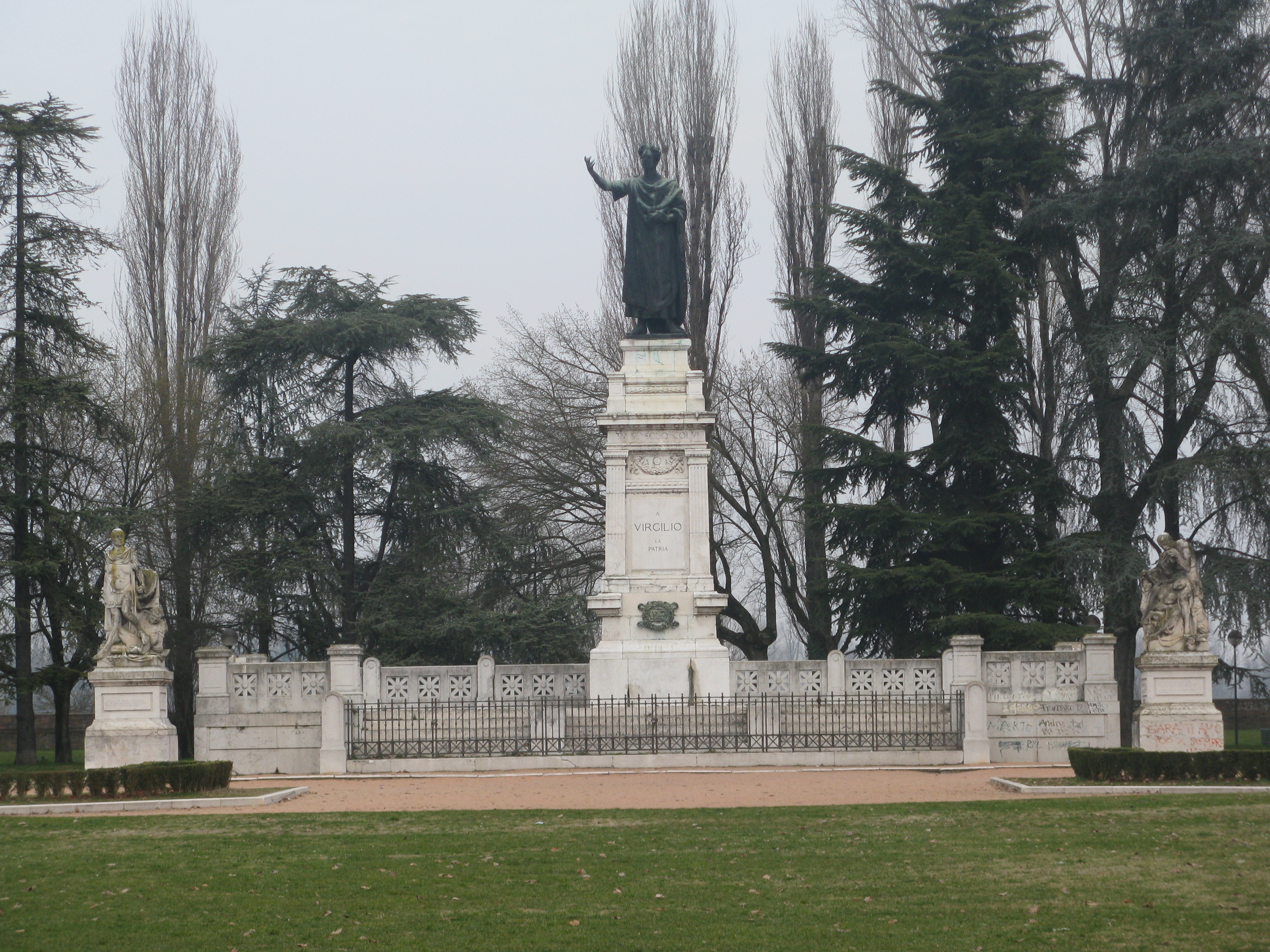
Monument to Virgil

The Piazza Virgiliana is an oblong shaped park in the center of Mantua, region of Lombardy Italy. It spans from a circumvailling Piazza Virgilliana street, fed from Piazza dei Filipinni by Via Virgilio, and stretching northwest towards Lago di Mezzo (part of Mincio River), from which it is separated by a wall and a span of the busy SS62 highway. The park has a number of tree-lined trails, and commemorative statues, most prominent of which is a monument to Virgil with flanking fountains.

== History ==
Prior to the Napoleonic occupation of Mantua, the region was a swampy inlet of the waters of Lago di Mezzo, and was occupied in part by the suppressed monastery of Sant'Agnese and an embankment on which was the church of Santa Maria dell'Argine. In 1797, the occupying French general, Sextius Alexandre François de Miollis, filled in the swamp and entrusted Paolo Pozzo to design a park for ambulation with marble benches along rows of trees. This Piazza Virgiliana was inaugurated on March 21, 1801, and displayed a bronze bust of the Ancient Roman poet atop a high column, placed near the site of the present monument. With the return of Hapsburg rule in the 19th century, the monument was disassembled in 1821, and the bust ended up in the Municipal building. In its place, an outdoor Virgilian Amphitheater designed by the architect Giuseppe Cantoni was erected in its place.

Further reconstruction was spurred by the economist and senator Giovanni Arrivabene, who by 1877, had established a committee to celebrate in Mantua the 1900th anniversary of the death of Virgil, who had been born in Mantua. By 1883, the committee had only collected 16,000 of the planned 150,000 lire in donations, thus delaying plans.

Ultimately in 1919 the amphitheater was demolished and the current Carrara marble monument designed by the architect Luca Beltrami was erected with a large bronze statue by Milanese sculptor Emilio Quadrelli. Flanking the monument are allegorical depictions of epic and bucolic poetry. The final cost exceeded one million lire, of which 400,000 lire had been collected by the committee established fifty years earlier, and to which were added contributions from the municipality of Mantua and the Italian state. The monument to Virgil was officially inaugurated on April 21, 1927.

Photographs of the monument in 2020 show defacement by graffiti.
