= Nectarius of Digne =

5th-century French bishop

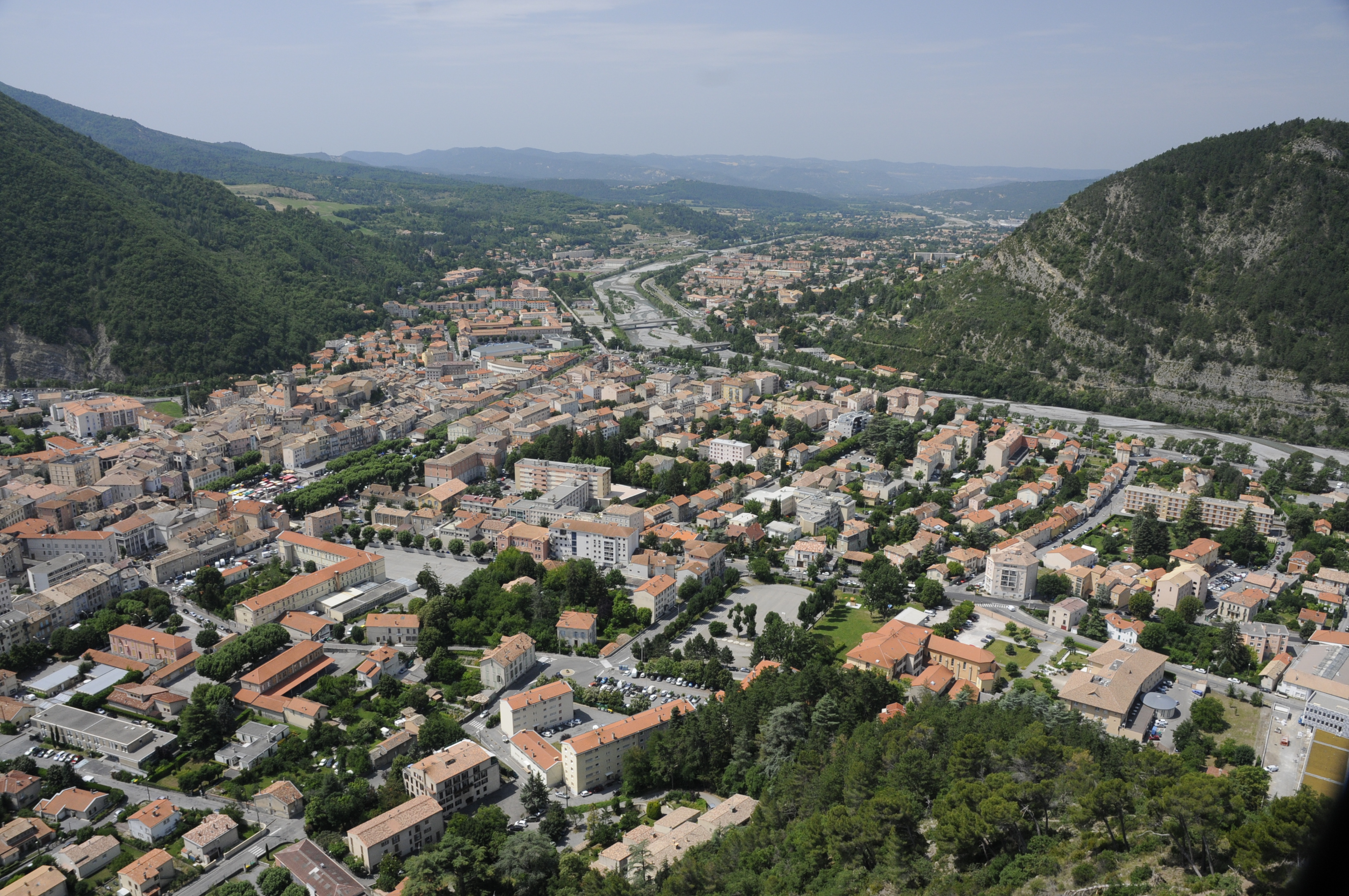
An aerial view of Digne-les-Bains

Nectarius of Digne (fl. 439–455) was believed to have been the third Bishop of Digne, the first bishop of Digne having been Saint Domnin and the second Saint Vincent. However, Pierre Gassendi considers it likely that an unknown bishop succeeded Saint Vincent as predecessor to Nectarius, making Nectarius the fourth bishop of Digne.

Nectarius is known to have been present at several Gallic synods, and he is mentioned in letters of pope Leo the Great. Councils he attended include Riez in 439, the Council of Orange in 441, and the Synods of Arles in 451 and in 455. In 449, with other bishops from Arles, he addressed pope Leo on the election of Ravennius as bishop of Arles, and he was one of those that Leo addressed in 450.

This same Nectarius is believed to have been a bishop of Avignon, not a bishop of Digne, by Louis Duchesne.

== See also ==
Titles of the Great Christian Church
Preceded by Saint Vincent of Digne, then possibly an unknown bishop	Bishop of Digne fl. 439–455	Succeeded by Memorialis of Digne
