= Garnier de Traînel =

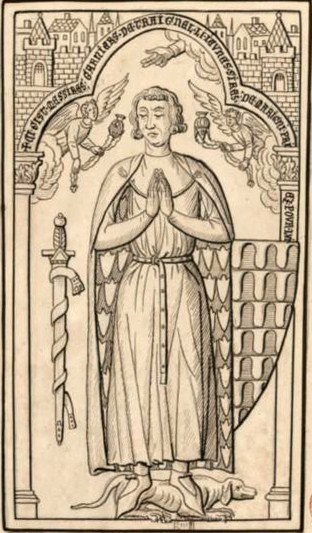
16th-century tomb effigy of Garnier de Traînel

Garnier de Traînel (or Traisnel; died 14 April 1205) was the bishop of Troyes from 1193 until his death. He took part in the Fourth Crusade (1202–1204) and in the founding of the Latin Empire.

A younger son of Garnier I, lord of Pont-sur-Seine and Traînel, Garnier was very old when he became a bishop. His uncle, Philippe de Pont, had previously been bishop of Troyes from 1083 to 1121, and his older brother, Ponce II, is recorded in a document from 1104.

== First pilgrimage ==
In 1197, Garnier set out to visit the Holy Land in fulfillment of a vow. One of the purposes of his journey was to settle some disputes troubling the church of Troyes through the intervention of Count Henry II of Champagne, then ruling the Kingdom of Jerusalem in right of his wife, Queen Isabella I. He got only so far as Piacenza when news reached him of the death of Henry on 10 September. In light of his vow he continued his journey into Tuscany, but there was met by some friends returning from the Holy Land, who informed him that the French were all leaving and that Jerusalem was dominated by the Germans who had just come over. After receiving permission from Pope Innocent III to fulfill his vow with a cash payment for the defence of the Holy Land, Garnier returned to Champagne. In a surviving letter, Innocent praises Garnier for his undertaking in light of his age: "Not the disadvantage of imminent old age, nor the danger of the route, neither the doubtful fealty and constant inconstancy of the sea have deterred [you]."

== Fourth Crusade ==
Garnier took a second vow to go to the Holy Land in 1199. He was with the crusader army that massed in Venice in 1202, and he accompanied it to the Siege of Zara (1202), thence to Corfu (1203) and finally the Sack of Constantinople (1204). He and the other clergy functioned as the conscience of the army, and they absolved the crusaders of wrongdoing for the sieges of Zara and Constantinople. Geoffrey of Villehardouin explicitly names the bishop of Troyes (li vesque de Troie) as among the clergy declaring the war to be just and right (droituriere).

Garnier appears to have been among the most trusted men in the crusader army. Early in 1204, Henry of Flanders defeated the Emperor Alexios V Mourtzouphlos in battle and captured an important icon that the imperial forces had been carrying. He gave the icon to Garnier for safekeeping. Likewise, after the fall of Constantinople, the numerous icons and relics plundered from the city's churches were given to Garnier on the order of the Papal legate, Peter of Capua, pending a final division of the booty. He refused to release the head of Saint Mammes to the priest Walon de Dampierre, who only obtained it from the legate after Garnier's death.

Garnier was one of the six ecclesiastical electors who, together with six Venetian electors, chose the new emperor, Baldwin I, on 9 May 1204. During the coronation festivities on 17 May, Garnier and the bishops of Soissons, Halberstadt and Bethlehem blessed the crown and placed it on Baldwin's head, then led him to the throne.

In a church dedicated to Saint Victor by the Golden Gate, Garnier discovered a relic of the head of the saint. At the request of his own chaplain, Peter, he had the head sent back to Pierre de Corbeil, archbishop of Sens and his superior. The archbishop in turn gifted the relic to the Canons Regular of Saint Victor in Paris.

Garnier died on 14 April 1205 in Constantinople and was buried there. On that same day, the crusaders suffered a major defeat at Adrianople against the Bulgarians.

== Sources ==
- Longnon, Jean (1978). Les compagnons de Villehardouin: Recherches sur les croisés de la quatrième croisade. Geneva: Librairie Droz.
