= Bienvenu de Miollis =

French bishop (1753–1843)

François-Melchior-Charles-Bienvenu de Miollis
- Bishop of Digne
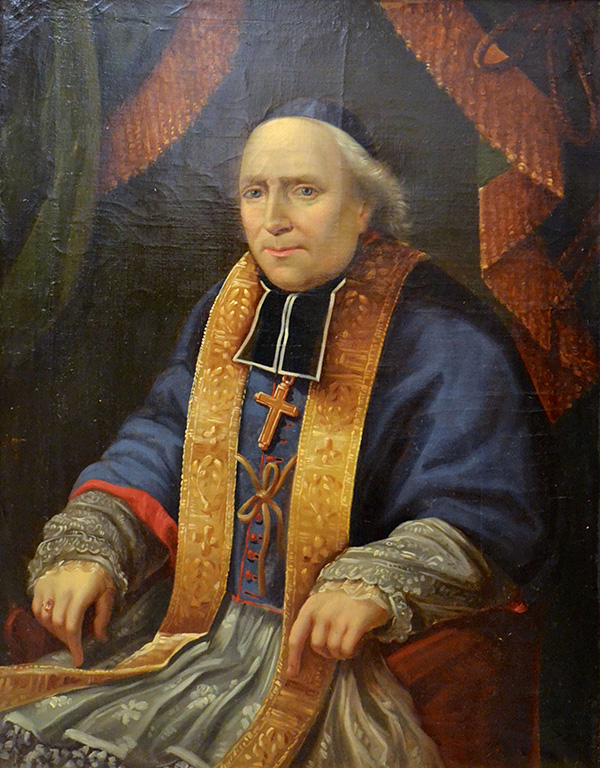
- Church: Roman Catholic Church
- See: Diocese of Digne
- In office: 28 Aug 1805－31 Aug 1838
- Predecessor: Irénée-Yves Desolle
- Successor: Marie-Dominique-Auguste Sibour

Personal details
- Born: 19 June 1753 Aix-en-Provence, France
- Died: 27 June 1843 Aix-en-Provence, France

François-Melchior-Charles-Bienvenu de Miollis (19 June 1753, Aix-en-Provence, France – 27 June 1843, Aix-en-Provence, France) was the Bishop of Digne from 1805 to 1838. He was the inspiration for Victor Hugo's character Bishop Myriel in the novel Les Misérables.

== Biography ==
Bishop de Miollis was the son of councillor in the Parliament of Provence. He had two brothers, one a lieutenant general (Sextius Alexandre François de Miollis), the other a prefect.

On 20 September 1777 he was ordained to the priesthood at Carpentras and dedicated himself to the ministry of teaching catechism in rural areas. During the French Revolution in 1791, he refused to take the oath and emigrated to Rome, where he remained for 10 years.

In 1801, he returned to Aix. He was appointed vicar of Brignoles in 1804. On 28 August 1805, he succeeded Irénée-Yves Desolle as the Bishop of Digne, which he remained until his resignation on 31 August 1838 at the age of 85 due to his health, becoming Bishop Emeritus of Digne. By then, he had earned the name "Bienvenu" (French for "welcome") due to his charitable nature and evangelical virtues he had shown. He then retired to Aix where he died in 1843, aged 90. He was succeeded by Marie-Dominique-Auguste Sibour. In the diocese of Digne, he is still remembered with much veneration.

Bishop de Miollis attended the Council of Paris of 1811, during which he resisted Napoleon's claims with great firmness. In June of the same year, Eugene de Mazenod met him in Paris, then again in Aix in 1817, during a confirmation service presided by the Bishop of Digne. After he had been appointed to Digne in 1805, Bishop de Miollis at his own expense bought back the church and the presbytery of the sanctuary of Notre-Dame du Laus, which had been confiscated during the French Revolution. In 1818, it was Bishop de Miollis who offered the Missionaries of Provence the direction of the shrine of Notre-Dame du Laus and also asked them to preach parish missions in the two dioceses. Bishop de Miollis ordained Father Noël Moreau to the priesthood in September 1818 and Father Hippolyte Courtès in July 1820.

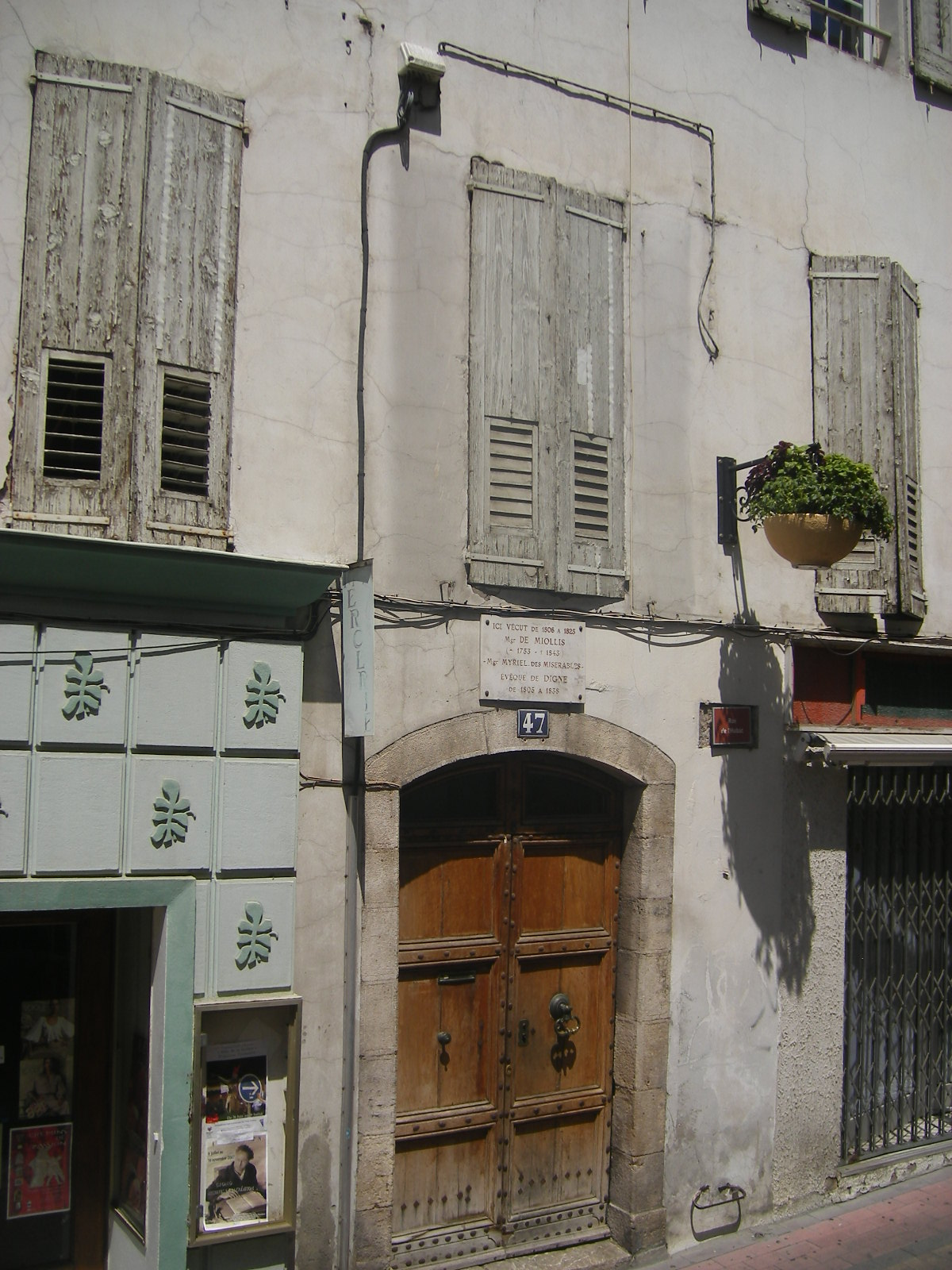
Bienvenu de Miollis's residence at 47 Rue De L'Hubac Digne, France

== Relations ==
=== Bishop de Mazenod and the Missionary Oblates of Mary Immaculate ===
Bishop de Miollis had frequent contacts with the Oblates. While they often preached in the diocese of Digne, Bishop de Miollis did not easily allow his priests to enter the congregation. The Oblate's founder, Bishop de Mazenod, recognised that Bishop de Miollis was "without doubt a holy bishop", despite complaining about Bishop de Miollis not easily allowing his priests to enter the Congregation.

In January 1826, Bishop de Mazenod was astonished to hear that Bishop de Miollis, after signing a letter of approval of the Rule, had also added his signature to a letter from Bishop Arbaud, the bishop of Gap, opposing Rome's approbation of the Rule. They claimed that the statutes had been too hastily examined, and were contrary to the rights of the bishops and to the civil laws of the Realm. Still, Bishop de Mazenod and Bishop de Miollis continued to correspond when Bishop de Miollis went to live in Aix from 1838 until his death in 1843.

== Comparisons between Bishop de Miollis and Bishop Myriel ==
Bishop de Miollis was the inspiration for Victor Hugo's character Bishop Myriel in the novel Les Misérables, with some similarities between the two; however, several notable differences between Myriel and de Miollis exist as well.

=== Similarities ===
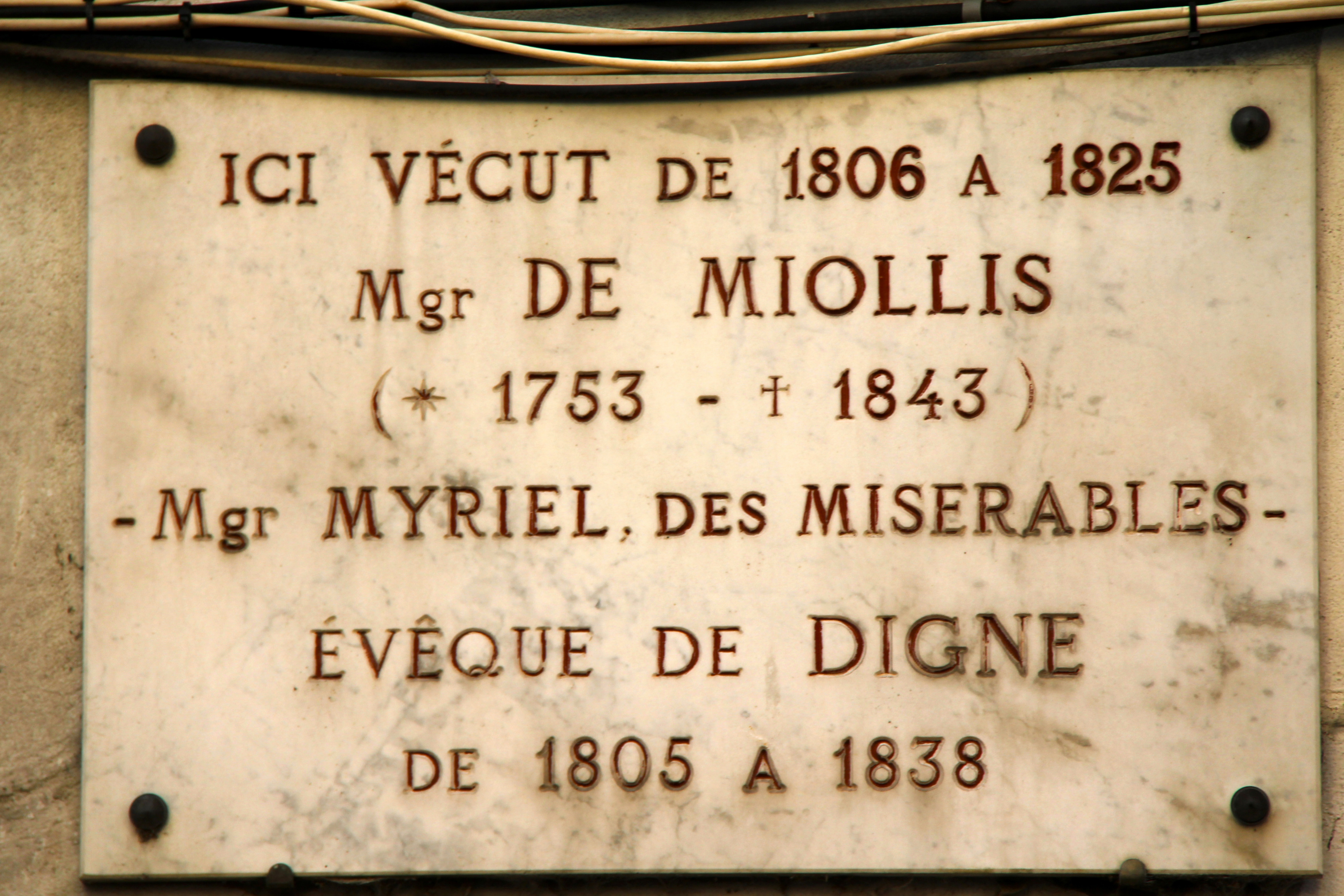
A plaque at Bienvenu de Miollis's residence at 47 Rue De L'Hubac Digne, France in honour of him inspiring Victor Hugo to create Bishop Charles François Myriel, and set him in his home there

Both Bishop Myriel and Bishop de Miollis were the son of councillors; both were named vicar of Brignoles in 1804 and bishop of Digne in 1806; both were known by the name of Bienvenu (French for the word "welcome") due to their charitable natures and evangelical virtues.

Myriel used his own silver candlesticks to redeem Jean Valjean, and Miollis used his own silver coin to redeem the church and the presbytery of the sanctuary of Notre-Dame du Laus.

=== Differences ===
Victor Hugo wrote that "...his [Bishop Myriel's] father had married him at a very early age, eighteen or twenty. In spite of this marriage, however, it was said that Charles Myriel created a great deal of talk. He was well formed, though rather short in stature, elegant, graceful, intelligent; the whole of the first portion of his life had been devoted to the world and to gallantry..." However, Bishop Miollis, on whom Bishop Myriel was based, was never married. His nephew, Francis de Miollis, wrote that "...the first portion of his life was devoted neither to the world nor to gallantry, and he did not offer the sad spectacle of the regrettable violences Victor Hugo has given to Bishop Myriel."

== Sources ==
- http://couleursdenuit.over-blog.com/m/article-4037652.html (French)

== See also ==
Catholic Church titles
Preceded by Irénée-Yves Desolle	Bishop of Digne; 28 Aug 1805－31 Aug 1838	Succeeded by Marie-Dominique-Auguste Sibour
