= Jean-Louis Verger =

French criminal

Jean-Louis Verger (20 August 1826 – 30 January 1857) was a French Catholic priest who assassinated Marie-Dominique-Auguste Sibour, the Archbishop of Paris, in January 1857, after the archbishop ordered him to desist from publishing pamphlets against clerical celibacy and the dogma of the Immaculate Conception. Verger was an opponent of this newly defined doctrine as well as celibacy for the clergy. Verger was also a continuous troublemaker, frequently complaining about his assignments, most of which he was unable to accomplish due to his temper. The trial became, in his mind, a sounding board for his notions. He was found guilty on the day of the trial (17 January 1857) and sentenced to death. To the end, Verger had convinced himself that Emperor Napoleon III would pardon him. When he was executed by guillotine at La Roquette Prisons on 30 January 1857, he was in a state of panic and fear due to the failure of the pardon to come.
