= François Nicholas Madeleine Morlot =

French prelate

His Eminence François Nicholas Madeleine Morlot
- Cardinal, Archbishop of Paris
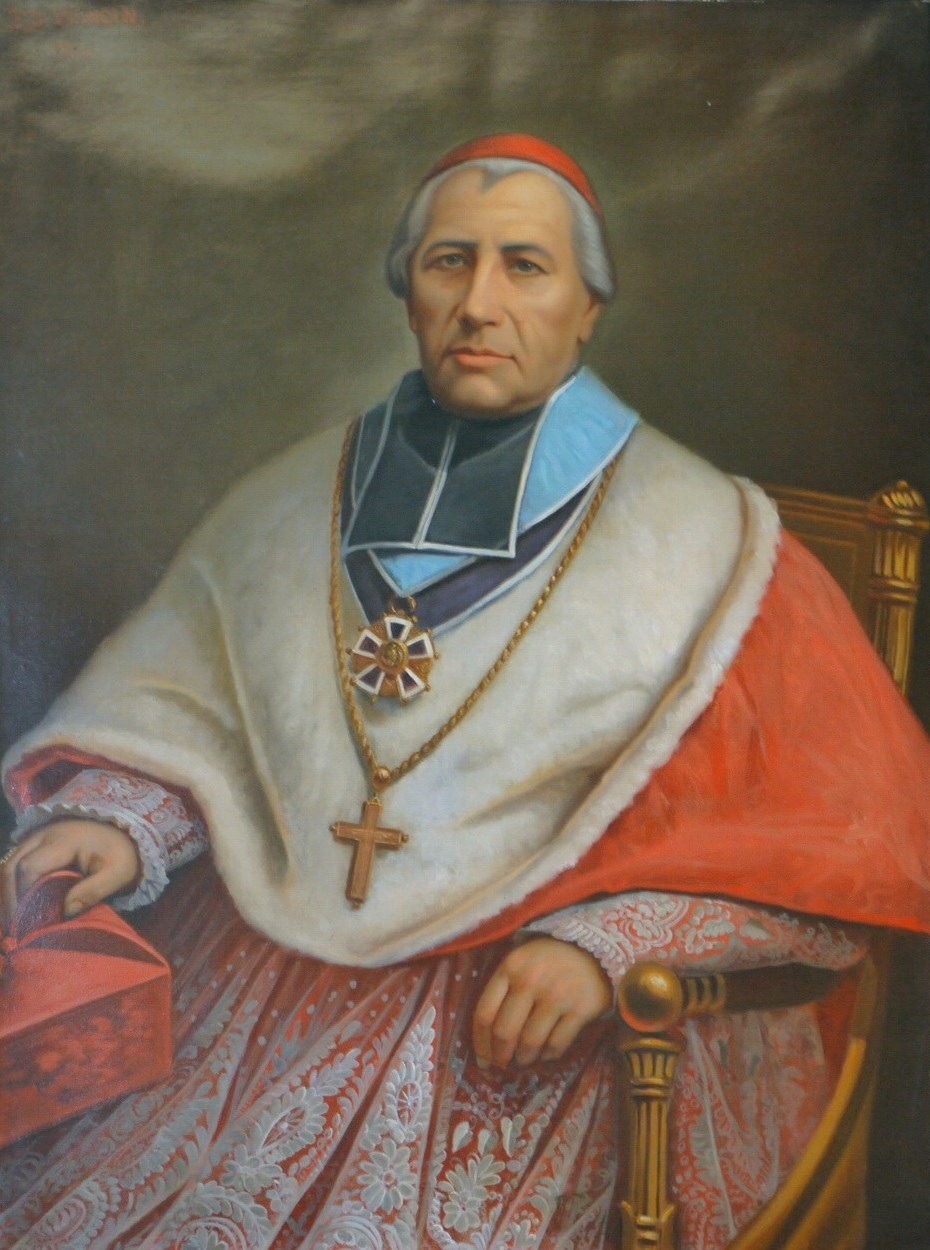
- Church: Roman Catholic Church
- Archdiocese: Paris
- See: Paris
- Appointed: 19 March 1857
- Installed: 25 April 1857
- Term ended: 29 December 1862
- Predecessor: Marie-Dominique-Auguste Sibour
- Successor: Georges Darboy
- Other post: Cardinal-Priest of Santi Nereo e Achilleo (1853-62)
- Previous posts: Bishop of Orléans (1839-43); Archbishop of Tours (1842-57)

Orders
- Ordination: 27 May 1820
- Consecration: 18 August 1839 by Charles-Auguste-Marie-Joseph Forbin-Janson
- Created cardinal: 7 March 1853 by Pope Pius IX
- Rank: Cardinal-Priest

Personal details
- Born: François Nicholas Madeleine Morlot; 28 December 1795 Langres, French First Republic
- Died: 29 December 1862 (aged 67) Paris, Second French Empire
- Buried: Cathedral of Notre-Dame
- Coat of arms

François Nicholas Madeleine Morlot (French: [fʁɑ̃swa nikɔla madlɛn mɔʁlo]; 28 December 1795 – 29 December 1862) was a French prelate of the Catholic Church. He was Archbishop of Paris from 1857 until his death. He was previously Bishop of Orléans from 1839 and then Archbishop of Tours from 1843.

== Life ==
Morlot was born in Langres was he began his studies before pursuing theological studies in Dijon. As he had not yet reached the required age for ordination, he worked for a time as a private tutor before becoming a priest. He was ordained in 1820.

Morlot served as vicar of the Cathedral of Saint Benignus of Dijon and in 1825 became vicar general of the Diocese of Dijon. In 1831, Claude Rey was named Bishop of Dijon, but as he had been appointed by the king, it was not received well by the diocesan clergy, including Morlot. Morlot resigned as vicar general and accepted an appointment as a cathedral canon. Morlot eventually penned a Remonstrance critical of the bishop exercising his public functions, and which contributed to Rey's resignation in 1838. Morlot was then again re-appointed vicar general.

=== Bishop ===
In March 1839, Morlot was made Bishop of Orléans. He was consecrated bishop August 18, 1839, in the chapel of the Dames du Sacré Coeur, Paris, by Charles de Forbin-Janson, bishop of Nancy et Toul.

King Louis Philippe I took the occasion of the christening of his grandson, Prince Philippe, comte de Paris, to recognize Morlot's valuables services and awarded him the Legion of Honour. In January 1843, Morlot was named Archbishop of Tours.

Pope Pius IX named him a cardinal in March 1853, and as such he took a seat in the senate of the Second French Empire. In June that year he was given the titular church of Santi Nereo e Achilleo. In January 1857, he was appointed to succeed the assassinated Marie-Dominique-Auguste Sibour as Archbishop of Paris.

Morlot died on 29 December 1862 in Paris and was interred in the cathedral Notre-Dame de Paris.

Catholic Church titles
Preceded by Marie Dominique Auguste Sibour	Archbishop of Paris; 1857–1862	Succeeded by Georges Darboy
