= Anapsychia =

Roman letter-writer

Anapsychia was a late Roman letter-writer, wife and widow of Marcellinus of Carthage, and correspondent of Jerome of Stridon.

== Biography ==
Anapsychia was married to Marcellinus of Carthage, the Roman imperial commissioner. The couple arrived in North Africa in 411 AD. By 413 AD, Marcellinus had been beheaded after accusations by Donatists. Very little is known about Anapsychia's life, including her dates of birth and death. However, the fact that she is a named correspondent makes her a notable late Roman woman.

== Correspondence ==
=== St Jerome ===
In Letter 126 to Anapsychia and Marcellinus, Jerome discusses the answer to their question on the origin of the soul. The letter is dated 412 AD, and in it Jerome also instructs the couple to speak to their bishop, Augustine of Hippo. The letter also discusses stoicism and the idea that the human soul is "consubstantial with the divine essence". Jerome also mentions that he has sent books with a Fabiola, that they can borrow if they like, demonstrating the literacy of women as well as men.

=== St Augustine ===
A letter from Anapsychia and Marcellinus to Jerome in Bethlehem written around 410 AD has been preserved in Augustine's letter collection as Letter 165. Augustine makes reference to the letter in Letter 166 to Jerome, written around 415, demonstrating that he had access to it. In Letter 151 (ca. 413 AD) from Augustine to Marcellinus, Augustine discusses her marriage, writing that Marcellinus was prevented by the bond of marriage from leaving all worldly concerns and enrolling in the army of Christ. Augustine hints that Marcellinus was committed to chastity within his marriage, but does not mention Anapsychia.
