= Domninus =

Domninus may refer to:

== Saints ==
- Saint Domninus or Saint Domnius, also Saint Duje, 3rd-century Syrian martyr-bishop, patron of the city of Split
- Saint Domninus of Fidenza (San Donnino di Fidenza) (d. 304)
- Saint Domninus of Parma (early 4th century), martyr under Diocletian
- Saint Domninus of Thessalonica (early 4th century), martyr (October 1, Eastern Orthodox liturgics)
- Saint Domninus of Digne, otherwise Saint Domnin (d. 379)
- Saint Domninus of Grenoble (d. 386), first bishop of Grenoble
- Saint Domninus of Vienne (d. 536), bishop of Vienne

== Others ==
- Domninus of Larissa, 5th-century Hellenistic Syrian Jewish mathematician
- Domninus of Antioch (Domnus), patriarch of Antioch (see List of Patriarchs of Antioch)
- Domnus II of Antioch
- Roman figure in the time of Petronius Maximus
- Man whom Serapion of Antioch addresses in one of his works
