= Digne Cathedral =

Latin Catholic church in Digne-les-Bains, France

Coordinates: 44°5′31″N 6°14′10″E

Digne Cathedral Cathédrale Saint-Jérome de Digne
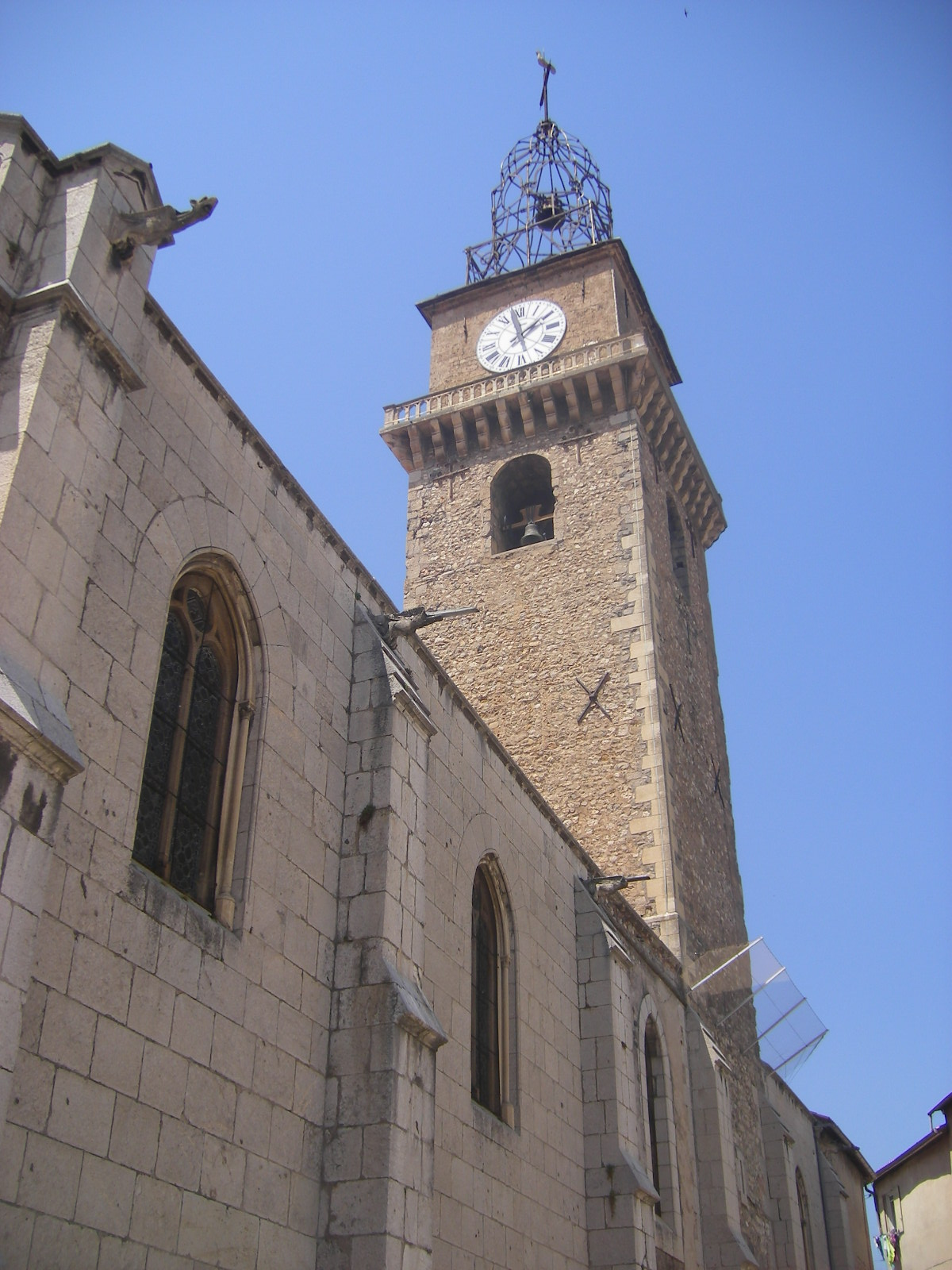
- Digne Cathedral

Religion
- Affiliation: Catholic Church
- Province: Bishops of Digne, Riez and Sisteron
- Region: Alpes-de-Haute-Provence
- Rite: Roman
- Ecclesiastical or organisational status: Cathedral
- Status: Active

Location
- Location: Digne-les-Bains, France
- Interactive map of Digne Cathedral; Cathédrale Saint-Jérome de Digne

Architecture
- Type: church
- Style: Romanesque
- Groundbreaking: 15th century
- Completed: 19th century

Digne Cathedral (French: Cathédrale Saint-Jérome de Digne) is a Latin Catholic church located in the town of Digne-les-Bains, France. The cathedral has been a monument historique since 1906. It is the seat of the Bishops of Digne, Riez and Sisteron, formerly Bishops of Digne.

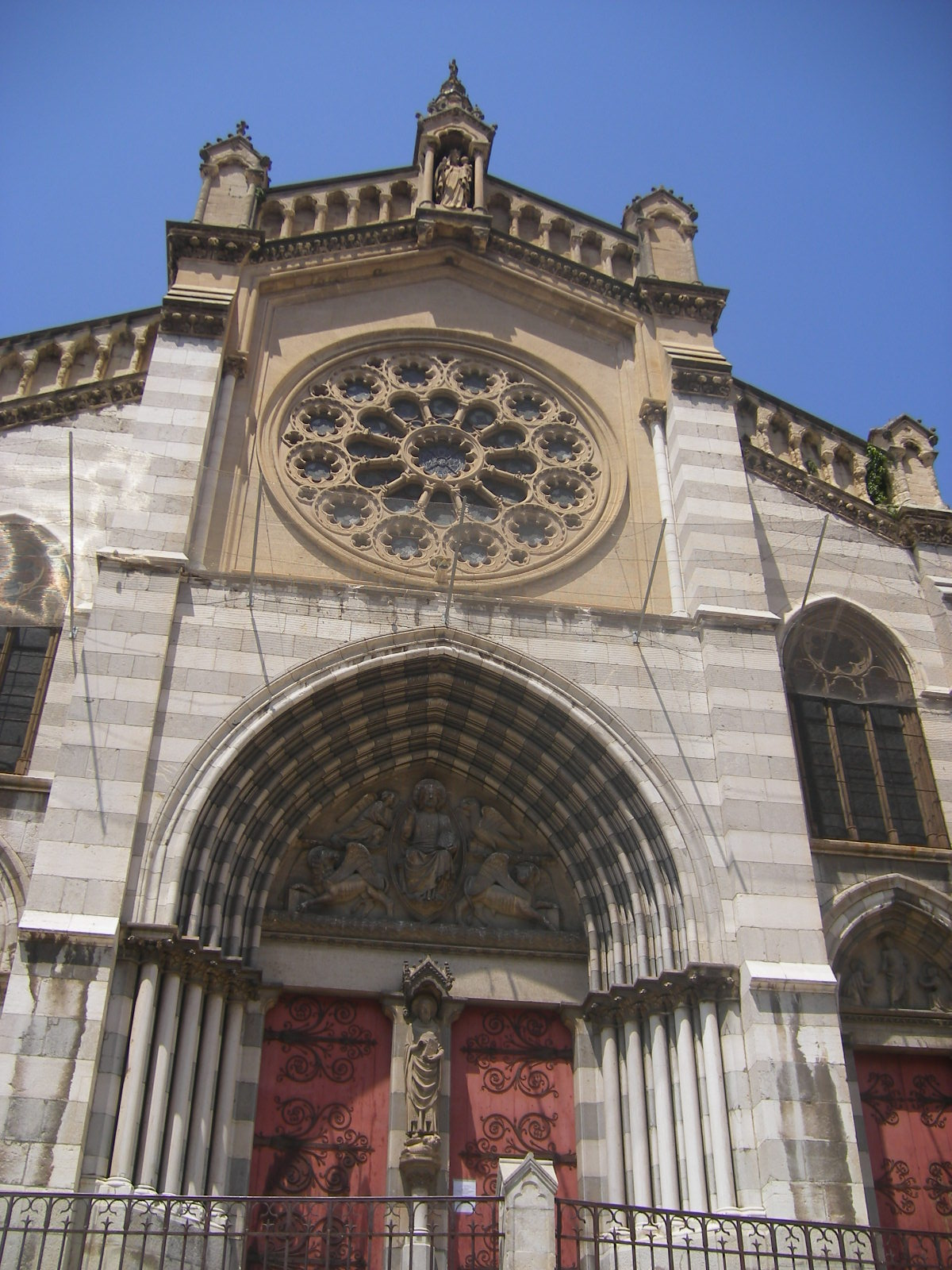
Digne Cathedral, west front

Construction began in 1490 by the order of the then bishop Antoine de Guiramand to cater for the movement of the town's population to a higher, more secure and defensible location round the local castle. The cathedral was renovated and expanded in the 1860s under the direction of architect Antoine-Nicolas Bailly.

The previous cathedral in the old town, Notre-Dame-du-Bourg (Cathédrale Notre-Dame-du-Bourg de Digne), a late Romanesque building of the 13th century, still stands as a museum.
