= Vincent of Digne =

French Roman Catholic saint

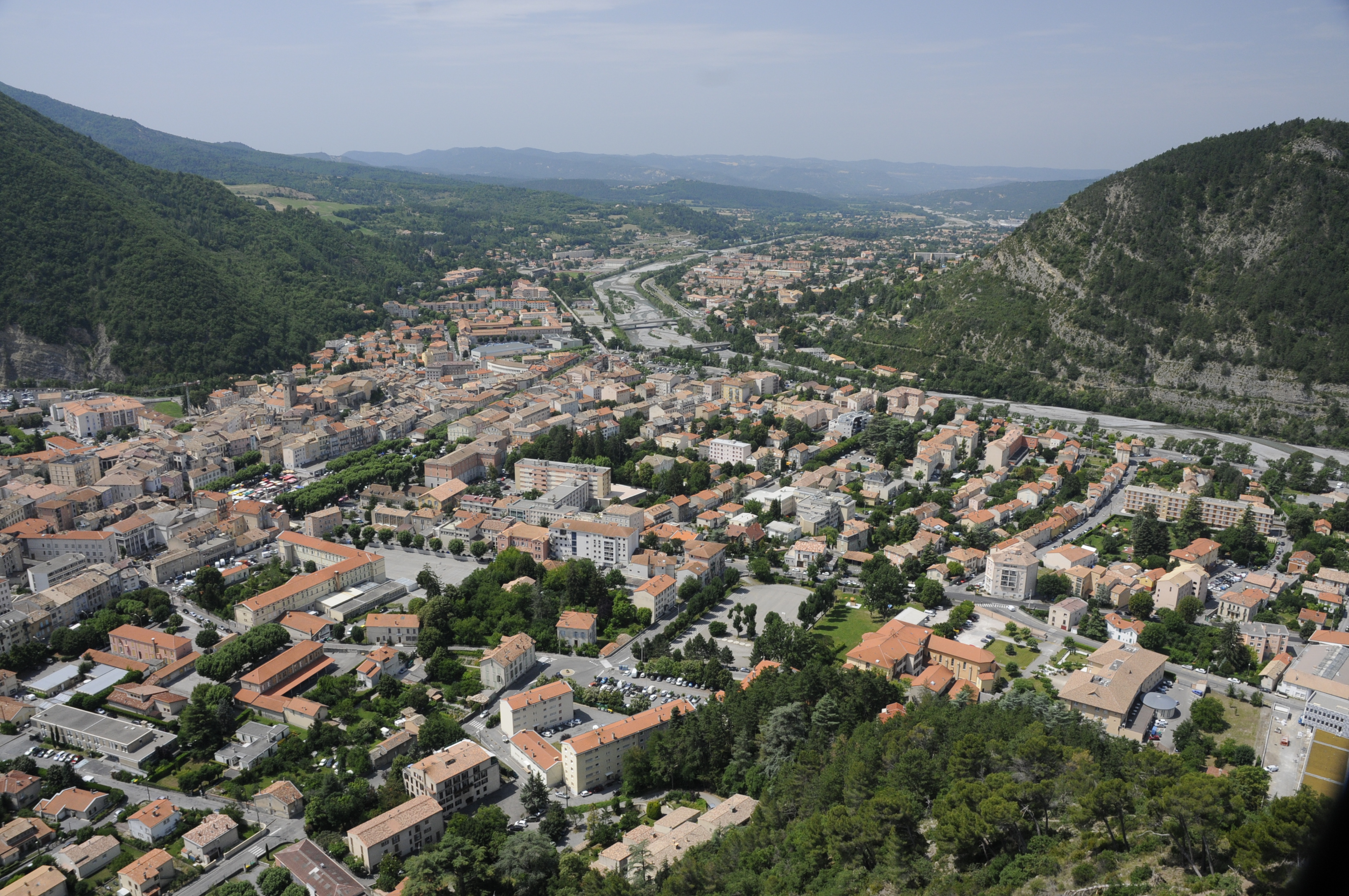
An aerial view of Digne-les-Bains

Saint Vincent was the second Bishop of Digne, from 380 to 394.

== Biography ==
Born in North Africa of Berber descent, like his predecessor Saint Domnin, he, together with Saint Marcellin and Saint Domnin, arrived in Rome in 313 with North African bishops. There, the council assembled to judge the three Donatists. After receiving the mission of Pope Melchiades, they went to Nice, having consulted the bishops assembled in council at Arles in 314. They preached the gospel to the inhabitants of the Italian side of the Alps, from the shores of the sea to Vercelli, where they parted.

Together with Saint Domnin, he decided to go preach in the Alps, converting the most people into Christianity in Digne-les-Bains. In the early days of Christianity, the missionaries became the first bishops in the main regions they evangelized in. He was part of the first teams of missionaries sent to evangelise Provence.

== Notes ==
Titles of the Great Christian Church
Preceded by Saint Domnin	Bishop of Digne; 380－394	Succeeded by unknown, then Nectarius of Digne
