= Fayl-Billot =

- Commune
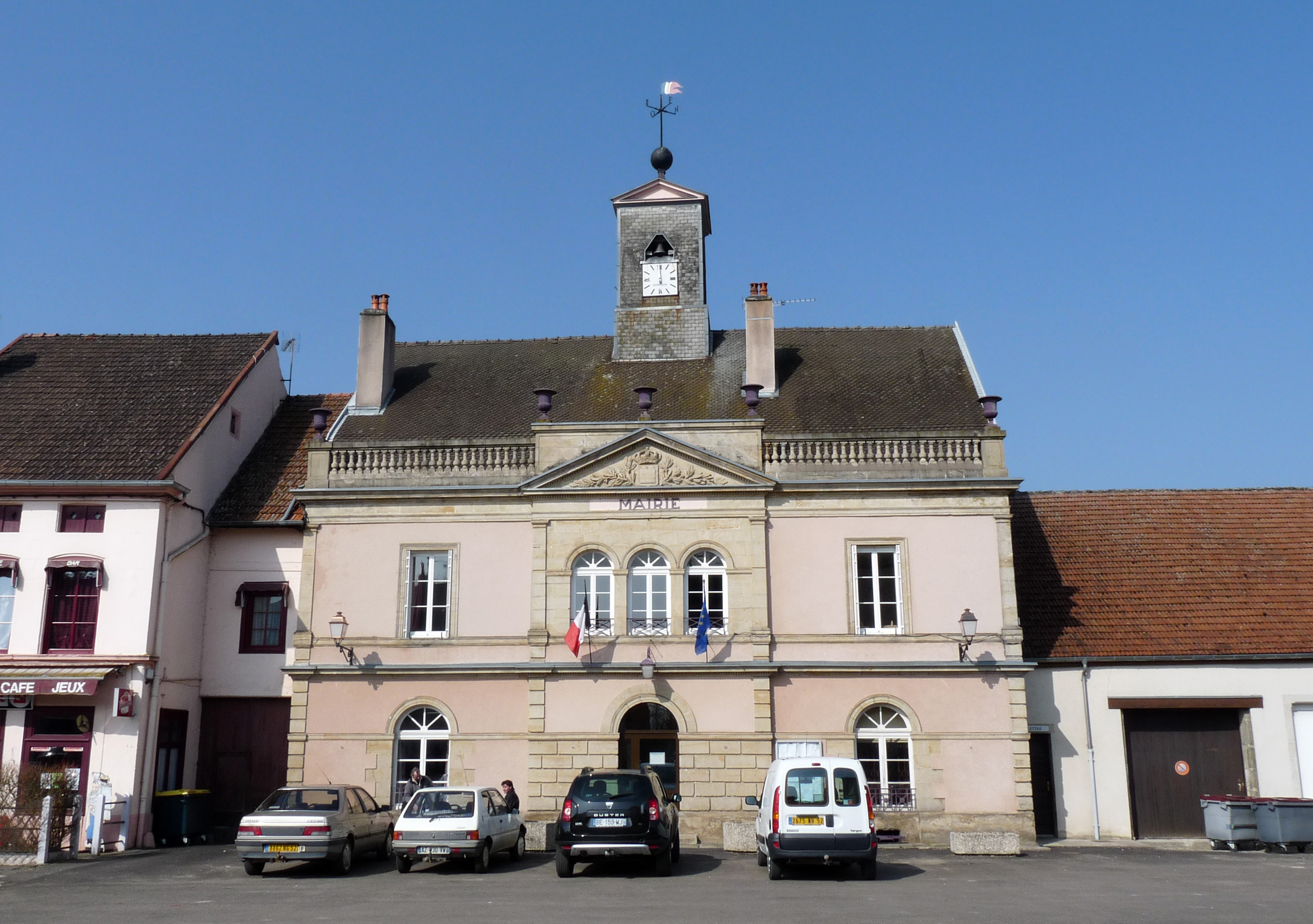
- The town hall in Fayl-Billot

- Coat of arms
- Location of Fayl-Billot
- Location within France Location within Grand Est
- Coordinates: 47°46′58″N 5°36′06″E
- Country: France
- Region: Grand Est
- Department: Haute-Marne
- Arrondissement: Langres
- Canton: Chalindrey
- Intercommunality: Savoir-Faire

Government
  - Mayor (2020–2026): Patrick Domec
- Area^{1}: 42.9 km^{2} (16.6 sq mi)
- Elevation: 333 m (1,093 ft)
- Highest elevation: 387 m (1,270 ft)
- Lowest elevation: 234 m (768 ft)
- Population (2023): 1,296
  - Density: 30.2/km^{2} (78.2/sq mi)
- Demonym(s): Fayl-Billotins, Fayl-Billotines
- Time zone: UTC+01:00 (CET)
  - Summer (DST): UTC+02:00 (CEST)
- INSEE/Postal code: 52197 /52500
- ^{1} French Land Register data, which excludes lakes, ponds, glaciers > 1 km^{2} (0.386 sq mi or 247 acres) and river estuaries.

Fayl-Billot (French pronunciation: [faj bijo, fɛj-]; before 1999: Fayl-la-Forêt) is a commune in the Haute-Marne department in north-eastern France. It was created in 1972 by the merger of three former communes: Broncourt, Charmoy and Fayl-Billot.

== See also ==
- Communes of the Haute-Marne department
