= Sextius Alexandre François de Miollis =

French military officer

- Born: 18 September 1759; Aix, Kingdom of France
- Died: 18 June 1828 (aged 68) Aix, Kingdom of France
- Allegiance: Kingdom of France; Kingdom of the French; French First Republic; First French Empire; Bourbon Restoration
- Service years: 1776-1815
- Conflicts: American Revolutionary War; Siege of Yorktown; French Revolutionary Wars; War of the First Coalition; Siege of Mantua (1796–1797); War of the Second Coalition; Siege of Genoa (1800); Napoleonic Wars; War of the Third Coalition; Occupation of Tuscany; War of the Fifth Coalition; Napoleonic occupation of Rome; Occupation of the Papal States (1807–1814); Hundred Days; Garrison duty at Metz

Sextius Alexandre François de Miollis (18 September 1759 – 18 June 1828) was a French military officer who served in the American Revolutionary War, the French Revolutionary Wars, and the Napoleonic Wars.

== Biography ==
He was born 18 September 1759, in Aix, France.

His father was a councilor of the provincial Parlement of Aix who was ennobled in 1770 for his services at the legal courts there.

He entered service at age 17 in the infantry regiment of the Soissonnais. In the last campaigns of the American Revolution, he served as sub-lieutenant under General Rochambeau. His face was disfigured in battle at the siege of Yorktown. He returned to France as a captain.

He headed the First National Battalion of volunteers of Bouches-du-Rhône. In the French Revolutionary Wars, he demonstrated skill and bravery, becoming a brigadier general in 1796.

Under Napoleon, he was deployed to Italy, taking part in the siege of Mantua. Commanding a division after the Treaty of Campo Formio, he was put in charge of the occupation of Tuscany.

Under General André Masséna, he took part in the 1799 defense of Genoa. He became the governor of Belle-Île-en-Mer in 1803, then of Mantua in 1806. At Mantua, he honored the Roman poet Virgil with a monument. With some pomp and circumstance, he transferred the ashes of Ludovico Ariosto to the University of Ferrara where they received proper homage. At Verona, he restored the Arena, one of the most important Roman amphitheaters.

In 1807, he commanded in Tuscany, occupying Rome with a division. He carried out his orders there with respect to Pope Pius VII and the queen of Etruria, Maria Luisa de Bourbon of Spain. He governed the Papal States until Napoleon's abdication in 1814.

Louis XVIII conferred upon him the departments of Bouches-du-Rhône and Vaucluse. Napoleon recalled him to duty during the Hundred Days to serve at Metz, where he remained until mid-October 1815, after which he retired permanently from active duty.

== Legacy ==
His name is engraved on the south side of the Arc de Triomphe.

== Family ==
His brother attained a doctorate in law in 1781, became a lawyer, and then prefect of Finistère from 1805 to 1815. Another brother held the bishopric of Digne from 1805 to 1838, probably a nepotistic Napoleonic appointment.
