= Marie-Dominique-Auguste Sibour =

French Catholic Archbishop

His Excellency Marie-Dominique-Auguste Sibour
- Archbishop of Paris
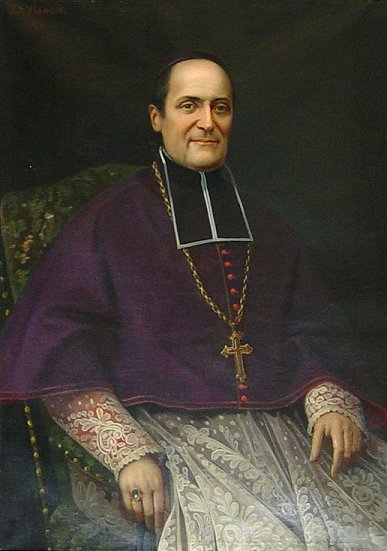
- Archbishop Sibour, c. 1850
- Church: Catholic Church
- Archdiocese: Paris
- Appointed: 1848
- Term ended: 1857
- Predecessor: Denis Auguste Affre
- Successor: François Nicholas Madeleine Morlot
- Previous posts: Bishop of Digne (1840-1848)

Orders
- Ordination: 1818

Personal details
- Born: 4 August 1792 Saint-Paul-Trois-Châteaux, Drôme
- Died: 3 January 1857 (aged 64) Saint-Étienne-du-Mont, Paris
- Coat of arms

Marie-Dominique-Auguste Sibour (French pronunciation: [maʁi dɔminik oɡyst sibuʁ]; 4 August 1792 – 3 January 1857) was a French Catholic prelate who served as Archbishop of Paris from 1848 to 1857.

== Life ==
Sibour was born at Saint-Paul-Trois-Châteaux in Drôme in 1792. After his ordination to the priesthood at Rome in 1818, he was assigned to the Archdiocese of Paris. He was named canon of the cathedral of Nîmes in 1822, became known as a preacher, and contributed to L'Avenir. In 1837, during a vacancy, he was chosen administrator of the Diocese of Nîmes, and two years later was made bishop of the Diocese of Digne.

His administration was marked by his encouragement of ecclesiastical studies, a practical desire to increase the importance of the functions exercised by his cathedral chapter, and an observance of canonical forms in ecclesiastical trials. The same principles actuated him in his rule of the Archdiocese of Paris, to which he was called largely because of his prompt adhesion to the new government after the Revolution of 1848. Sibour was part of the ministerial commission which prepared the draft project for the Falloux Laws on education, which highly increased the clergy's influence in schools.

He held in 1849 a provincial council in Paris, and in 1850 a diocesan synod. In 1853 he officiated at the marriage of Napoleon III, who had named him senator the previous year.

Although in his answer to Pope Pius IX he declared the definition of the Immaculate Conception inopportune, he was present at the promulgation of the decree and shortly afterwards solemnly published it in his own diocese. The benevolent co-operation of the imperial government enabled him to provide for the needs of the poor churches in his diocese and to organize several new parishes. On 13 May 1856, he granted Peter Julian Eymard permission to found in the Archdiocese of Paris a new Religious Institute, which became known as the Congregation of the Blessed Sacrament. He also aimed at introducing the Roman Rite in Paris and was progressing favorably in this direction at the time of his death.

== Assassination ==
Sibour was assassinated at the church of St. Etienne du Mont by an interdicted priest named Jean-Louis Verger, who openly admitted to the crime.

Archbishop Sibour may be the only cleric murdered in modern times due to his assassin's views on papal doctrine. Verger was an opponent of the newly defined doctrine of Immaculate Conception as well as celibacy for the clergy. Verger was also a continuous troublemaker, frequently complaining about his assignments, most of which he was unable to accomplish due to his temper. The trial became, in his mind, a sounding board for his notions. He was found guilty on the day of the trial (17 January 1857) and sentenced to death. To the end, Verger had convinced himself that Emperor Napoleon III would pardon him. When he was executed at La Roquette Prisons on 30 January 1857, he was in a state of panic and fear due to the failure of the pardon to come.

== Sources ==
- Kershaw, Alister, Murder in France (London: Constable, 1955).
- L'episcopat francais, 1802–1905 (Paris, 1907), 215–16; 460–61, passim
- McCaffrey, Lawrence, History of the Catholic Church in the Nineteenth Century, I (2nd ed., Dublin, 1910), 63, 236, 241, 243–4.

Catholic Church titles
Preceded by Denis Auguste Affre	Archbishop of Paris; 1848–1857	Succeeded by François-Nicholas-Madeleine Morlot
