= Marcellinus of Gaul =

- Bishop of Embrun
- Successor: Artemius

Personal details
- Born: Marcellinus; North Africa
- Died: 374; Embrun

Sainthood
- Feast day: 20 April

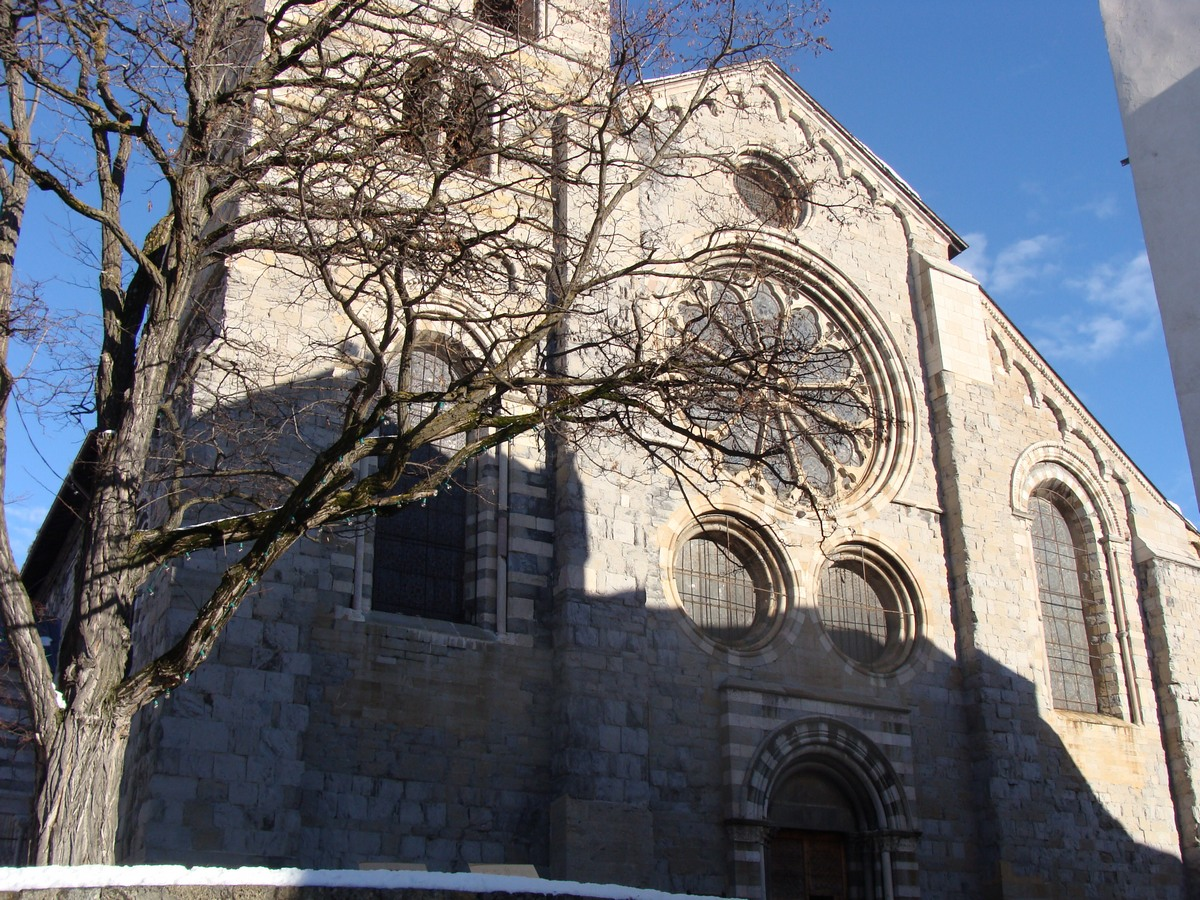
Notre-Dame d'Embrun Cathedral: the facade.

Marcellinus of Gaul also known as Marcellin was the first bishop of Embrun from 354 AD. He was a native of Africa Proconsularis.

Marcellin, went to Rome with two other bishops of North Africa, Vincent and Domnin, to attend a synod in 313 to judge the Donatists movement. They met the then Pope, Miltiades and from him received a mission. They went to Nice, where they landed, they say, after taking advice of the bishops assembled in Arles in 314. They went and preached the gospel to the inhabitants of Italian side of the Alps, from the shores of the sea to Vercelli, where Eusebius was chosen as bishop and where they separated.

Marcellin and his two disciples then headed towards the Alps and arrived in Embrun. As the main missionaries evangelizing in the regions they became the first bishops. Marcellin became the first bishop of Embrun and Vincent, bishop of Digne.

Catholic Church titles
Preceded by NA	Bishop of Embrun; 354–c.374	Succeeded by Artemius
