= Denis Auguste Affre =

Catholic Archbishop of Paris killed in June 1848

Denis-Auguste Affre
- Archbishop of Paris
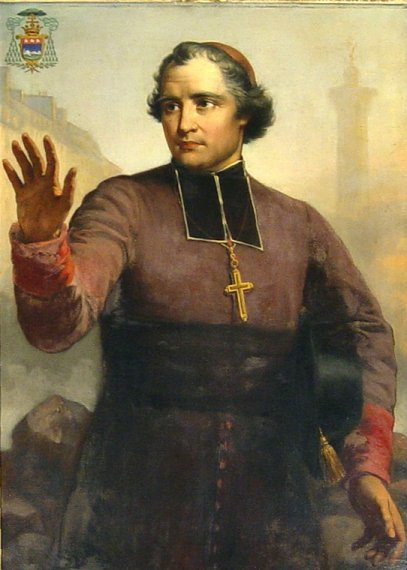
- Denis Auguste Affre by Auguste-Hyacinthe Debay
- See: Paris
- Installed: 4 June 1840
- Term ended: 27 June 1848
- Predecessor: Hyacinthe-Louis de Quélen
- Successor: Marie-Dominique-Auguste Sibour
- Other posts: Coadjutor Bishop of Strasbourg (1839–1840); Titular Bishop of Pompeiopolis in Cilicia (1839–1840); Vicar General of the Roman Catholic Diocese of Amiens and then of the Roman Catholic Diocese of Luçon (1823–1833)

Orders
- Ordination: 16 May 1818
- Consecration: 6 August 1840 by Cardinal Hugues-Robert-Jean-Charles de la Tour d’Auvergne-Lauraquais

Personal details
- Born: September 28, 1793 Saint-Rome-de-Tarn, Aveyron, France
- Died: June 27, 1848 (aged 54) Paris, France
- Buried: Cathedral of Notre-Dame de Paris, France
- Denomination: Catholic Church
- Coat of arms

Denis-Auguste Affre (French: [dəni oɡyst afʁ]; 27 September 1793 – 27 June 1848) was a French clergyman who served as Archbishop of Paris from 1840 to 1848. He was killed while trying to negotiate peace during the June Days uprising of 1848.

== Life ==
=== Early life and career ===
Affre was born at Saint-Rome-de-Tarn, in the department of Aveyron. At the age of 14, he began to study for the priesthood at the Seminary of Saint-Sulpice, Paris, which was under the direction of his uncle, the Abbé Denis Boyer, S.S. He was an excellent student, and, while still a seminarian, soon became an instructor of dogmatic theology at the seminary in Nantes.

In 1818, he was ordained as a Catholic priest. From 1823 to 1833 he served as the Vicar General, first of the Diocese of Luçon and then of Amiens. In 1839, he was appointed as coadjutor bishop of the Diocese of Strasbourg. This post, however, he never filled, being called on to act as Vicar-Capitular of Paris, conjointly with MM. Auger and Morel, at the death of Archbishop Quélen.

Affre was elevated to the post of Archbishop of Paris in 1840. Though opposed to the government of King Louis Philippe I, he fully accepted the establishment of the French Second Republic in 1848; nevertheless he took no part in politics, but devoted himself to pastoral care. He opened new parishes in the working-class neighborhoods of the city. Among them were Ménilmontant, Plaisance, Petit-Montrouge, Maison-Blanche, Petit-Gentilly, Notre-Dame de la Gare, Billancourt, Gros-Caillou.

Affre was passionate in his determination to improve the study of theology in order to form clergy needed in the challenges which the Catholic Church faced at the time. He also was insistent on education as a human right. He opened a new seminary in Paris, called the St. Joseph of the Carmelites Seminary, on the site of a former Carmelite priory, and a school of theology at the Sorbonne.

=== Death ===
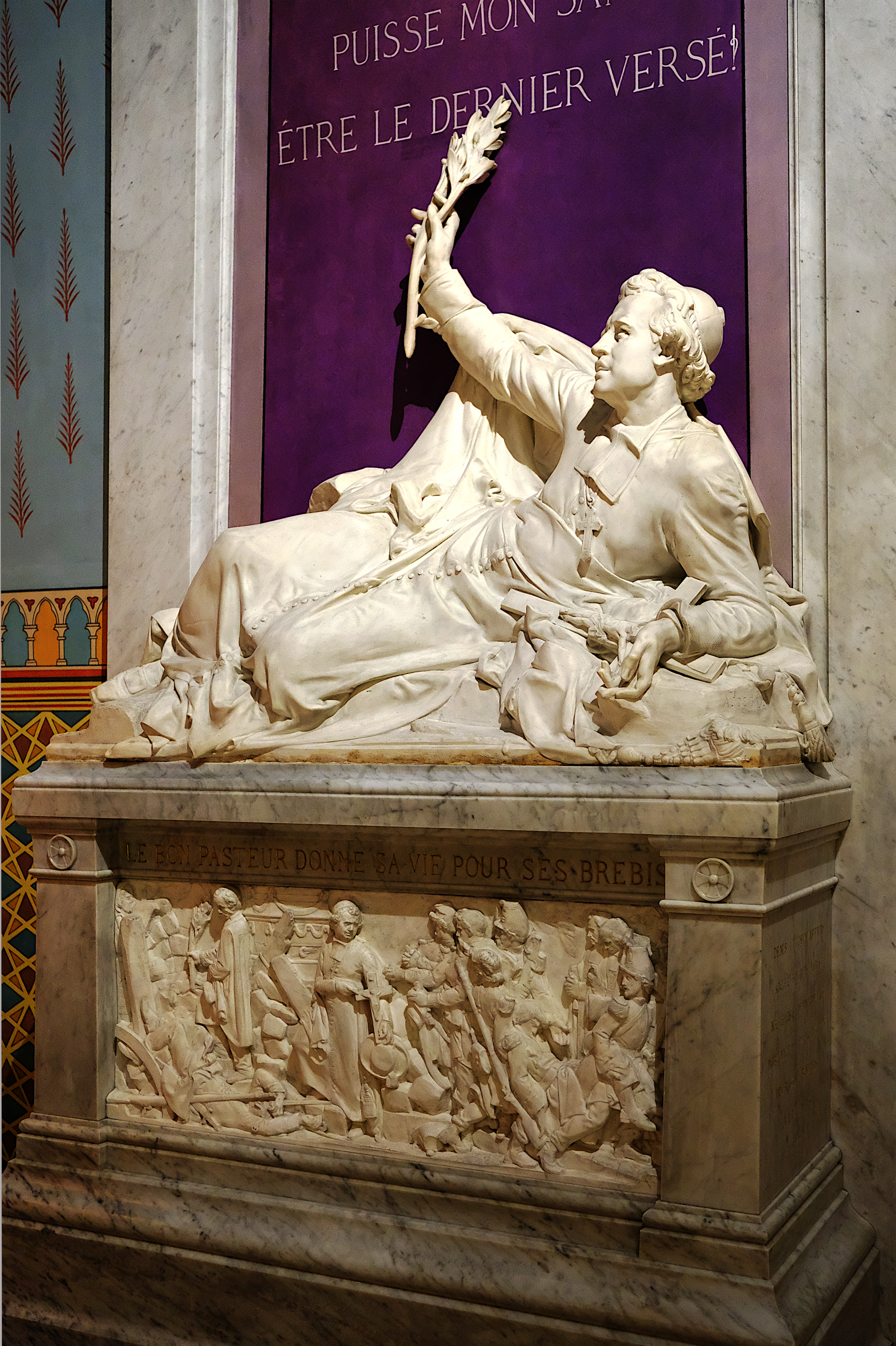
Cenotaph of Denis-Auguste Affre at Notre-Dame-de-Paris

Affre's episcopate is chiefly remembered for its tragic close during the insurrection of June 1848.

On 23 June 1848, faced with starvation due to plans by the French government to close the National Workshops it had recently created in order to provide work to the poor, a large segment of the citizenry began rioting, setting up barricades in the streets of Paris. The crisis led to the government's handing dictatorial powers over the nation to General Louis Eugène Cavaignac, who was determined to use all force necessary to crush the rebellion and ordered the French National Guard into Paris. Seeing the carnage caused among the civilian population by this campaign, Frederic Ozanam, the founder of the Society of St. Vincent de Paul, begged Affre to intervene to stop the bloodshed. The archbishop was led to believe that by his personal involvement peace might be restored between the military and the insurgents.

Accordingly, on 25 June, in spite of the warning of Cavaignac, Affre mounted the barricade at the entrance to the Faubourg Saint-Antoine, bearing a green branch as sign of peace, to address both sides. He had spoken only a few words when an exchange of fire began in which he was struck by a stray bullet. There have been conflicting claims as to whether the fatal bullet was fired by an insurgent or by the government forces. He was taken to his palace, where he died on 27 June.

On the next day, the National Assembly of France issued a decree expressing its great sorrow over Affre's death, and the public funeral held on 7 July was one of the most striking public spectacles of the period. The crowd following his cortege was estimated to have numbered about 200,000 people.

Affre was buried in the Chapel of Saint-Denis in the Cathedral of Notre-Dame de Paris. His heart was removed and preserved in the chapel of the Carmelite Seminary, which he had founded.

== Legacy ==
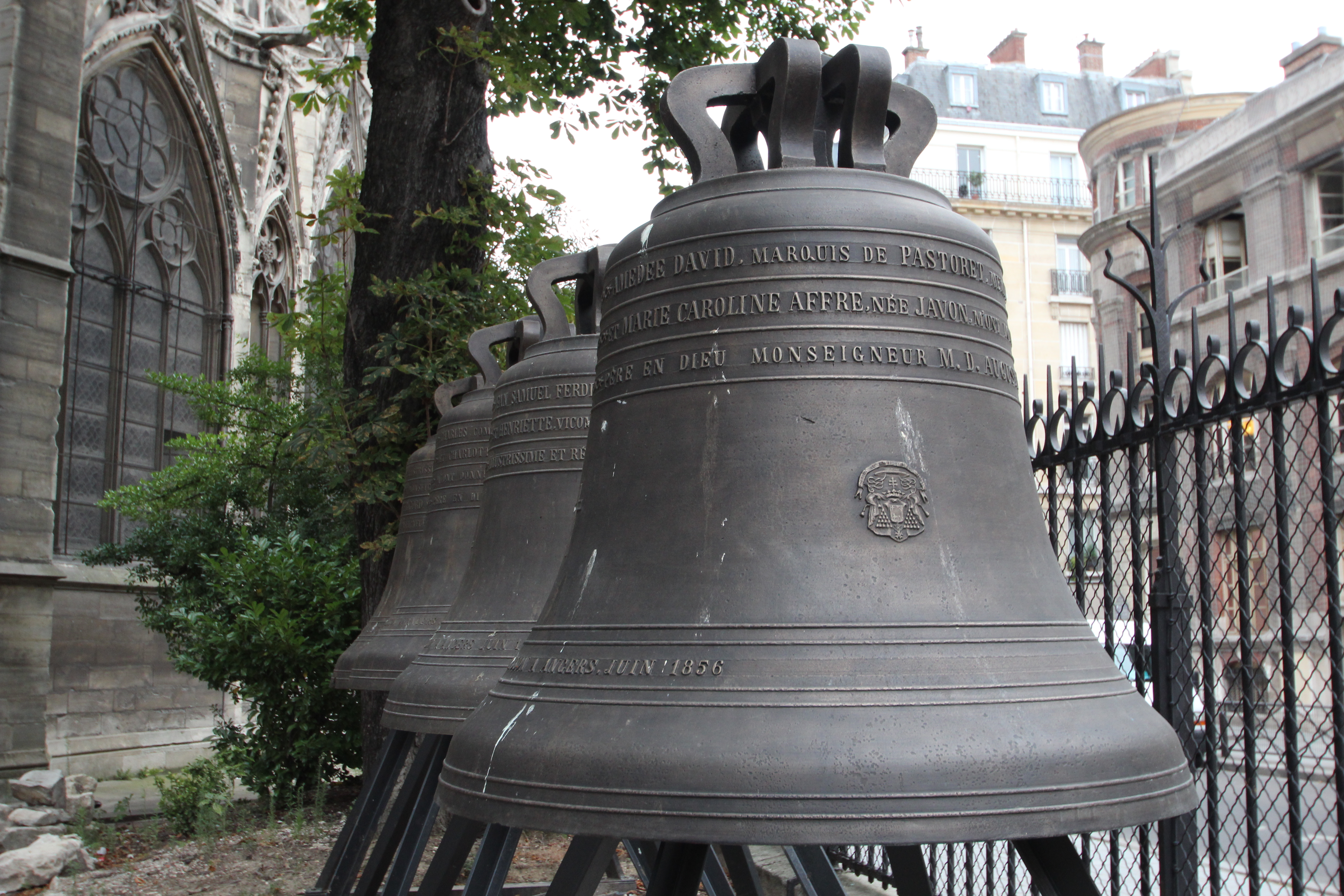
Old bells of Notre-Dame de Paris presented at the back of the cathedral in Paris. The name of the archbishop's niece Marie Caroline Affre appears in the first bell's inscription.

The pectoral cross which he was wearing when he was shot – seen in his portrait – is preserved by the Archdiocese of Paris as a relic.

In 1856, the smallest of the four "Benjamines," four new bells made for Notre-Dame, was named Denise David in honor of Affre and Amédée-David de Pastoret. Affre's niece by marriage, Marie Caroline Affre, served as godmother to the bell during the baptism ceremony.

A street in the 18th arrondissement of Paris is named in his honor.

== Writings ==
Affre wrote several articles for a newspaper called La France chrétienne. Additionally he published two books to guide in the practical matters of handling Church property: Un Traité de l'administration temporelle des paroisses (Paris, 1827) and Un Traité de la propriété des biens ecclésiastiques (Paris, 1837). He also wrote a guide to studying the Christian faith, Une Introduction philosophique à l'étude du christianisme (Paris, 5th edition, 1846).

== Sources ==
- Endnotes
  - Ricard (1893). Les grands eveques de l'eglise de France au XIXe siècle (in French). Lille.
  - Alazard, L. (1905). Denis-Auguste Affre, archeveque de Paris (in French). Paris.
- Endnotes:
  - Fisquet, Honoré (1867). La France pontificale (in French). Vol. I. Paris. p. 619.
  - D'Avenel, Georges (1878). Les évêques et archevêques de Paris (in French). Vol. II. Paris. p. 264.
  - The Biographies of De Riancey (in French). Paris. 1848.
  - Cruice (in French). Paris. 1850.
  - Castan (in French). 1864.

Catholic Church titles
| Preceded by Hyacinthe-Louis de Quélen | Archbishop of Paris; 1840–1848 | Succeeded by Marie Dominique Auguste Sibour |
