= Diocese of Domokos =

The Diocese of Domokos (Latin dioecesis Domocensis or Dimicensis) or Thaumaci (Thaumacensis) was an ancient bishopric centred on the town of Domokos. It has been a suffragan of the See of Larissa since 732, when it ceased to be under the jurisdiction of the Patriarch of the West (the Pope). In 1882, when Domokos became part of the Kingdom of Greece, the diocese became subject to the autocephalous Church of Greece. It was suppressed in 1899.

== Latin diocese ==
In 1204, when Domokos fell to the Fourth Crusade, the authority of the Pope was reestablished and a series of Latin bishops held the diocese. The impoverished diocese was incapable of supporting more than three clergy in 1210, and in July 1208 it had been administratively united to the diocese of Kalydon by Pope Innocent III. Its incumbent at that time was a Burgundian, Gales of Dampierre, the second Latin bishop. After Domokos was reconquered by the Byzantine Empire, it became a titular see for the Latins. Three medieval titulars are known: Marcus Morellus, from about 1334; John, who died in 1366; and his successor, another John, a Franciscan friar. The Latin diocese of Domokos has been vacant since 21 November 1943.

=== List of titular Catholic bishops ===
Titular bishops of Domokos (Thaumaci)
No.	Name	Office	from	to
1	Enrique Lasso de la Vega		15 December 1728	
2	Ramón Falcón Salcedo	Abbot of San Ildefonso	25 November 1790	21 February 1794
3	Francisco Javier de Lizana y Beaumont	Auxiliary bishop of Toledo	18 December 1795	11 August 1800
4	József Király	Auxiliary bishop of Esztergom	18 September 1807	11 January 1808
5	Justo Santa María de Oro y Albarracín, OP	Apostolic Vicar of San Juan de Cuyo	15 December 1828	30 September 1834
6	Johann Georg Müller	Auxiliary bishop of Trier	22 July 1844	4 October 1847
7	John Thomas Mullock, OFM	Coadjutor of St. John's	14 December 1847	14 July 1850
8	Georges-Claude-Louis-Pie Chalandon	Coadjutor of Belley	3 October 1850	25 July 1852
9	Manuel Ignacio Riaño, OP	Apostolic Vicar and Coadjutor of Bùi Chu	20 August 1866	26 November 1884
10	Peter Bourgade	Apostolic Vicar of Tucson	7 February 1885	10 May 1897
11	Jean-Marie Simon, OSFS	Apostolic Vicar of Keimoes-Upington	3 May 1898	21 November 1932
12	Marie-Luc-Alphonse-Emile Barillon, MEP	Bishop emeritus of Malakka	10 January 1933	27 July 1935
13	Gustave-Georges-Arsène Vandaele, MEP	Apostolic Vicar and Coadjutor of Hung Hoá	7 July 1936	21 November 1943

== Sources ==
- Pétridès, S. (1912). "Thaumaci". The Catholic Encyclopedia. New York: Robert Appleton Company.
- Richard, Jean (1989). "The Establishment of the Latin Church in the Empire of Constantinople (1204–1227)". In Arbel, Benjamin; Hamilton, Bernard; Jacoby, David (eds.). Latins and Greeks in the Eastern Mediterranean after 1204. London: Frank Cass. pp. 45–62.
- Thomas, John P. (1987). Private Religious Foundations in the Byzantine Empire. Washington, D.C.: Dumbarton Oaks. ISBN 9780884021643.
