= Domokos (name) =

Domokos is a Hungarian given name and surname that may refer to

Given name

- Domokos Bölöni (born 1946), Romanian Magyar writer and journalist
- Domokos Kosáry (1913–2007), Hungarian historian and writer
- Domokos Szollár (born 1975), Hungarian businessman

Surname

- Gábor Domokos (born 1961), Hungarian mathematician
- József Domokos (1890–1978), Hungarian jurist
- László Domokos (born 1965), Hungarian politician
