= Honoré Bouche =

French cleric and historian

- Born: 27 May 1599; Aix-en-Provence
- Died: 16 March 1671 (aged 71); Aix-en-Provence
- Occupation: historian

Honoré Bouche (27 May 1599 – 16 March 1671) was a French priest and historian of Provence.

== Biography ==
Honoré Bouche was born in Aix-en-Provence on 27 May 1599. He was the son of Balthazard Bouche and Louise Meyronnet. His older brother, born 21 December 1591 and named Balthazard after their father, was twice consul of Aix-en-Provence in 1635 and 1647. Honoré Bouche is known for having written a history of Provence entitled Chorographie ou description de la Provence et Histoire chronologique du même pays in two folio volumes to which he added additions and corrections. He gave his manuscript free of charge to the province, which had it printed at its expense.

He is also known to have written as "Doctor of Holy Theology and Provost of Saint James", in 1646, The Holy Virgin of Laurete, or History of the various transports of the House of the Glorious Virgin Mary who was in Nazareth for the Anne of Austria. He wrote other lesser-known works, notably on the arrival of Saint Mary Magdalene and Saint Lazarus in Provence. Honoré Bouche delivered the funeral oration of Nicolas-Claude Fabri de Peiresc in Rome in front of the Pope, the cardinals and a crowd of scholars.

He died in Aix-en-Provence on 16 March 1671

== Publications ==
- Honoré Bouche, La sainte Vierge de Laurette, chez Claude le Beau, rue saint Jacques, au bon Pasteur, 1646, avec privilège et approbation. Réédition Hachette Livre, BNF, impression à la demande. (Hachettebnf.fr
- Honoré Bouche (1664), La chorographie ou description de Provence, et l'histoire chronologique du mesme pays, vol. 1, Aix: C. David, p. 938, OCLC 409006682.
- Honoré Bouche (1664), La chorographie ou description de Provence, et l'histoire chronologique du mesme pays, vol. 2, Aix: C. David, p. 1089, OCLC 409006682
- Honoré Bouche. Provinciae romanorum antiquae quae et celtoliguria et galloliguria, carte de 60 x 30; (collection Raymond Joffre)

== Sources ==
- Bouche, Honoré (1664), Additions et corrections à la Chorographie & à l'Histoire de Provence (in French)
- Bouche, Honoré (1664b), Additions à l'Histoire, pour le tome second (in French)
- Bouche, Charles-François (1785), Essai sur l'histoire de Provence, suivi d'une notice des provençaux célèbres (in French), vol. II, Marseille: Jean Mossy père et fils, p. 566
- Roux-Alphéran, Ambroise (1846), Les rues d'Aix: Recherches historiques sur l'ancienne capitale de la Provence (in French), vol. I, Aix-en-Provence: Typographie Aubin, p. 558
