= Gales of Dampierre =

Gales of Dampierre (French Walon de Dampierre, Latin Gualo de Domna Petra) was a priest and soldier in Frankish Greece, one of the original participants in the Fourth Crusade. He rose to become bishop of Domokos.

Walon may have been a son of Richard de Dampierre. He was a priest in the diocese of Langres before he joined the Crusade. According to the anonymous Historia translationum reliquiarum sancti Mamantis ("History of the Translation of the Relics of Saint Mammes"), he was a "man of honest living and good testimony" (vir honeste vite et boni testimonii) but also as a soldier "not the least in the army of the Latins" (in exercitu Latinorum non minimus). In Constantinople he came into "custody of cantorship in the church of the Forty Martyrs of Sebaste and of the provostship in another" (custodiam cantoriae in ecclesia sanctorum XL martyrum ... et custodiam alterius praepositurae). By virtue of these offices he participated in the election of the Latin Patriarch of Constantinople.

Walon became bishop in 1207, but three days after his consecration he abandoned his diocese on account of its abject poverty, leaving it in the custody of the powerful secular lord Amé Pofey. This provoked the intervention of Pope Innocent III, and on 14 July 1208 he combined the diocese of Domokos and Kalydon.

Later, Walon obtained the relic of the head of Mammes of Caesarea, the patron saint of Langres, from the Papal legate Peter of Capua. He brought it to Dampierre before bestowing it on the cathedral of his native diocese. There survives a letter from Peter to Robert de Châtillon, bishop of Langres, and his chapter advising them of Walon's mission.

== Sources ==
- Angold, Michael (2003). The Fourth Crusade: Event and Context. London: Longman.
- Janin, R. (1944). "Les sanctuaires de Byzance sous la domination latine (1204–1261)" (PDF). Études byzantines. 2: 134–84. doi:10.3406/rebyz.1944.915.
- Longnon, Jean (1978). Les compagnons de Villehardouin: Recherches sur les croisés de la quatrième croisade. Geneva: Librairie Droz.
- Richard, Jean (1989). "The Establishment of the Latin Church in the Empire of Constantinople (1204–1227)". In Arbel, Benjamin; Hamilton, Bernard; Jacoby, David (eds.). Latins and Greeks in the Eastern Mediterranean after 1204. London: Frank Cass. pp. 45–62.
- Thomas, John P. (1987). Private Religious Foundations in the Byzantine Empire. Washington, D.C.: Dumbarton Oaks. ISBN 9780884021643.
