= Saint Domnin =

4th-century French archbishop and Catholic saint

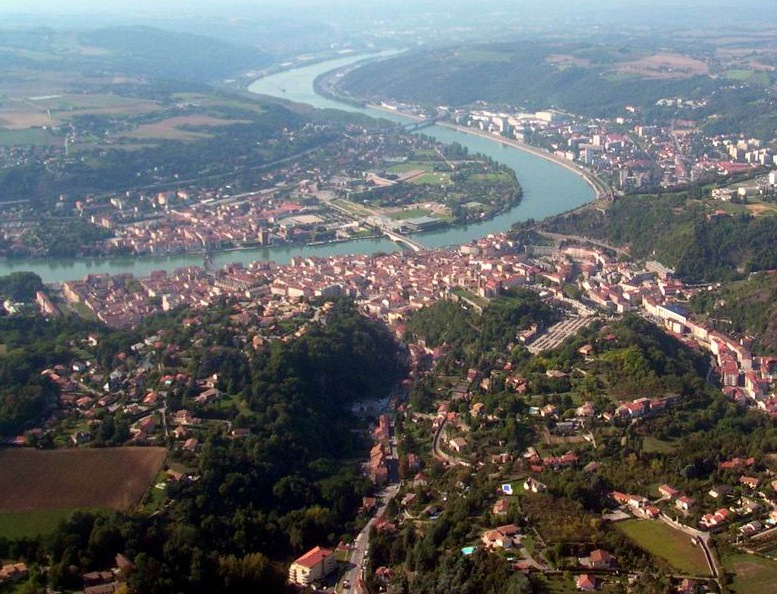
Vienne, Isère, where Saint Dominin had been Archbishop

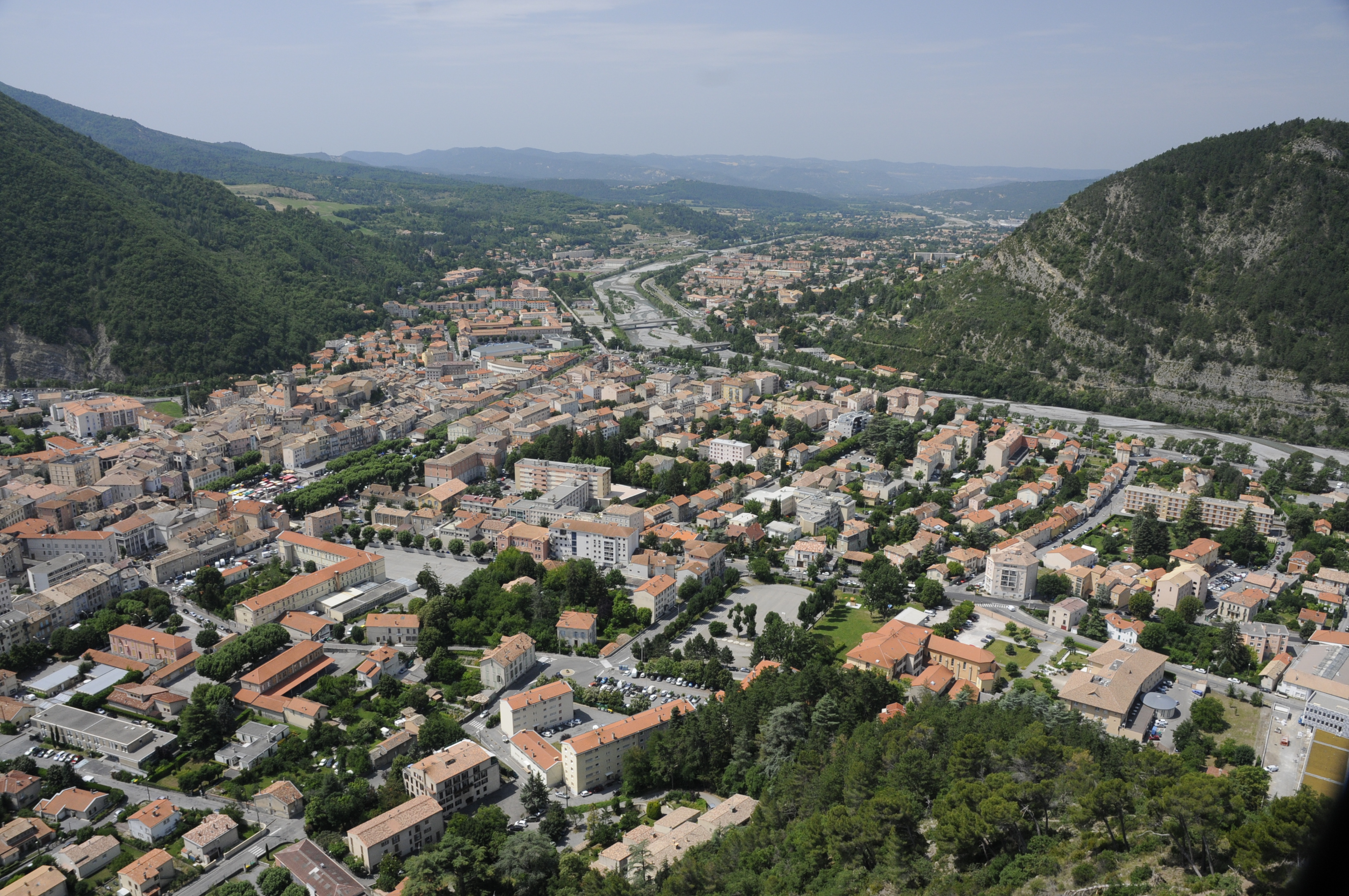
Digne-les-Bains 09, an aerial view

Domnin (died 5 November 379) was the first Bishop of Digne, from 364 to 379 and was also the archbishop of the city of Vienne, Isère. He is venerated as a saint in the Catholic Church.

== Biography ==
A native of Africa Proconsularis, he, together with Saint Marcellin and Saint Vincent, arrived in Rome in 313 with North African bishops. There, the council assembled to judge the three Donatists. After receiving the mission of Pope Melchiades, they went to Nice, having consulted the bishops assembled in council at Arles in 314. They preached the gospel to the inhabitants of the Italian side of the Alps, from the shores of the sea to Vercelli, where they parted.

Together with Saint Vincent, he decided to go preach in the Alps, converting the most people into Christianity in Digne-les-Bains. It was reported that he publicly healed a great number of people and baptised five hundred people on the same day. In the early days of Christianity, the missionaries became the first bishops in the main regions they evangelized in. He also took part in the evangelisation of the valley of Ubaye. Canonized by the Catholic Church, he is celebrated locally in the Roman Martyrology on 5 November.

== Sources ==
Titles of the Great Christian Church
Preceded by Title created	Bishop of Digne; 364－379	Succeeded by Saint Vincent of Digne
