= Marcellinus of Carthage =

Roman martyr

Martyr
- Born: Toledo, Spain
- Died: 13 September 413; Africa
- Venerated in: Eastern Orthodox Church, Roman Catholic Church
- Canonized: Pre-Congregation
- Feast: September 13

Marcellinus of Carthage was a Christian martyr and saint who died in 413. He was secretary of state of the Western Roman Empire under Roman emperor Honorius and a close friend of Augustine of Hippo, as well as a correspondent of Saint Jerome. Saint Augustine dedicated the first books of his landmark The City of God to Marcellinus in 413.

== Life ==
Flavius Marcellinus was born in Toledo in Spain, and had a brother, Apringius. He came to hold the rank of tribunus et notarius under Emperor Honorius. He was described as "a cultured, generous aristocrat, interested in theology". His interest in religious questions, brought about close and friendly relations between him and St. Augustine, who wrote him several letters, and dedicated various books to him ("De peccatorum meritis et remissione", "De baptismo parvulorum", and the first three books of "De Civitate Dei"). Saint Jerome also wrote him. He was married to Anapsychia.

=== Donatist controversy ===
In Africa, the dispute between the Donatists and orthodox Christians was not only doctrinal but also involved regional and social tensions: Numidia against proconsular Africa, and proletarians against Roman landowners. In 405 an imperial decree declared the Donatists heretics and prescribed confiscation of their property. The fall of Stilicho in 408, led them to hope for a change in imperial policy; however, in 410 Marcellinus was given instructions to "abolish the new superstition". The orthodox bishops hoped the Donatists would be more susceptible to reasoned debate and petitioned the emperor to call a conference.

Marcellinus was sent to Africa in 411, charged with presiding over the Council of Carthage in early June of that year. In his summons to the parties, Marcellinus made no secret of the emperor's position. Bishops representing each side of the controversy debated the issue. The proceedings were transcribed and remain to this day. Marcellinus, as the emperor's representative, ruled that the Donatists were heretics and that they had to give up their churches and return to churches under the control of orthodox bishops and priests. According to John T. Noonan, the Donatists alleged that Marcellinus had been bribed as that was a stronger argument than that he was merely enforcing imperial policy.

The judgment was enforced by the Roman army with great severity. So bloody was the persecution of the Donatists that Augustine, who had been one of the leaders in condemning Donatism as a heresy, protested at their treatment.

Subsequently, some of the Donatists engaged in sporadic violence against orthodox priests. Marcellinus presided at the trials of those arrested. Augustine appealed for clemency both to Marcellinus and Marcellinus's brother Apringius, who was proconsul for Africa. Noonan views the fact that Augustine and Marcellinus remained close friends as suggesting that the bishop's petition was granted.

=== Death ===
In 413, the Donatists accused Marcellinus and Apringius of involvement in the rebellion of Heraclianus. General Marinus, who had quashed the rebellion and who had Donatist sympathies, arrested the brothers and put them in prison. Even with Saint Augustine intervening on their behalf with Caecilian, the presiding judge of their case, the two brothers were executed, on September 13. The following year, Marcellinus was exonerated by Emperor Honorius.

== Veneration ==
Marcellinus was subsequently listed in the Roman Martyrology.

Saint Marcellinus has a statue adorning the spire atop the south transept of the Duomo di Milano, and a statue on the southern half of Bernini's colonnade in Saint Peter's Square, Vatican City.

== Sources ==
- Brown, Peter. Augustine of Hippo: a Biography (Berkeley: University of California Press, 2000). See particularly the chapters 25–28 for Marcellinus' role in the Donatist controversy and his juridical murder after Heraclion's attempted coup.
