= Narcissus, Argeus, and Marcellinus =

Saints Narcissus, Argeus and Marcellinus

Martyrs
- Died: ~320 AD; Tomi
- Venerated in: Roman Catholic Church
- Feast: January 2

Saints Narcissus, Argeus and Marcellinus (d. 320 AD) are Christian saints and martyrs. Tradition states that they were brothers enlisted as soldiers in the army of Licinius. After refusing to perform military service due to their faith, they were tried and put to death at Tomi. Another version is that the three brothers who suffered martyrdom at Tomis in Pontus (on the Black Sea), under the Emperor Licinius, who obliged all his soldiers to offer sacrifice to the gods. Because of their refusal, the three brothers were put to death. Argeus and Narcissus were beheaded, while Marcellinus, only a boy, was flogged, imprisoned, and then drowned by being thrown into the Black Sea.

Their feast day is January 2.
