= La Roquette Prisons =

Former houses of detention in Paris, France

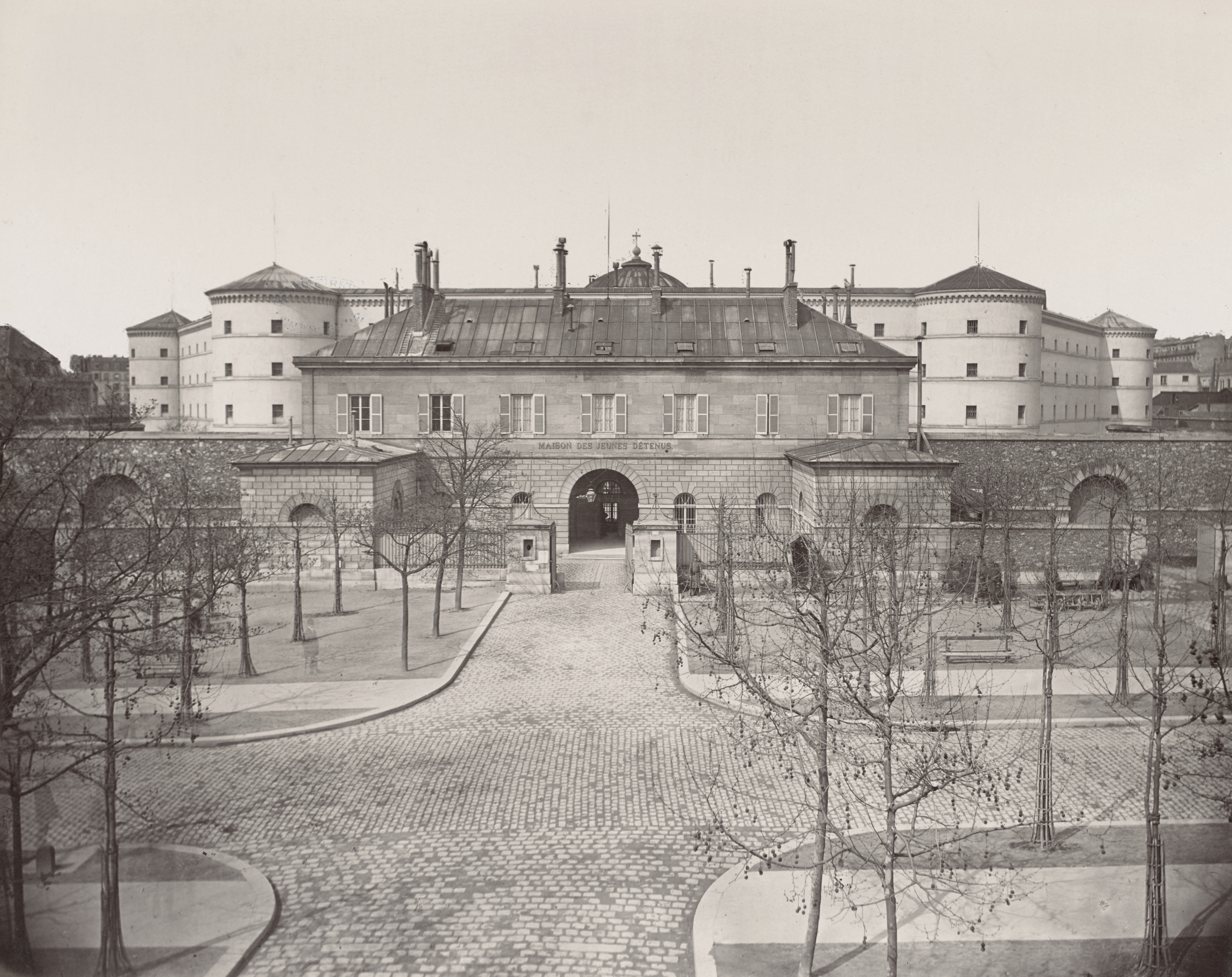
Prison de la Roquette

The La Roquette Prisons (the Grande Roquette and the Petite Roquette) were prisons in the 11th arrondissement of Paris, on both sides of the rue de la Roquette. Opened in 1830, they were finally closed in 1974. Today the site of la petite Roquette is occupied by square de la Roquette, the largest square in the 11th arrondissement.

== History ==
In 1826, under Charles X, the decision was made to build a prison for minors aged 7 to 20 (the age of majority in France was then set at 21). The location is not far from the Père-Lachaise cemetery, at 143, rue de la Roquette, on part of the grounds of the former convent of the Hospitalières de la Roquette, built in 1690 and closed during the French Revolution in 1789. The architect Hippolyte Lebas, creator of the Notre-Dame-de-Lorette church, was chosen to carry out this project. Inspired by the plans of Jeremy Bentham's Panopticon, he designed a hexagonal prison, inaugurated on September 11, 1830, and quickly christened "la Roquette" by Paris locals. The conditions of detention there were particularly difficult and aroused the indignation of some of the locals.

The same year, Louis-Philippe I, alarmed by the increase in the number of prisoners in Paris, decided to build another prison in Paris, which already had no less than a dozen. The architect François-Christian Gau was appointed to draw up the plans for the new prison. Gau's plan was simple: an enclosure wall surrounding a square building with a central courtyard, showing his desire to differentiate his design from that of the prison for young offenders. The contrast was quite evident, as the new facility was to be built on land facing the already-extant prison.

While the construction of the second prison, located at 164–168, rue de la Roquette, was underway, strong protests arose against the proposed keeping of prisoners sentenced to death there. The guillotine had been transferred from the Place de Grève to the Arcueil Gate (also known as the Saint-Jacques Gate, at the current location of the Saint-Jacques metro station), in the south of Paris. The distance between La Roquette and the Saint-Jacques gate being about 5 km entailed a long distance for prisoners to travel between their place of detention and place of execution.

This second prison was inaugurated on 24 December 1836, and on the same day forty paddywagons (called paniers de salade, or “salad baskets” in French) transferred 187 prisoners there from Bicêtre Prison.

The official name of the new penitentiary was the Dépôt de condamnés (“Convict Depot”). It was there that convicts awaited departure for the Ile de Ré, then for French penal colonies in Cayenne or Nouméa. But the facility also held those prisoners condemned to death. To distinguish between the two prisons, which stood just across the street from each other, Parisians give them distinctive nicknames: the criminal youth were housed in “la Petite Roquette”, and murderers in “la Grande Roquette”.

Media related to Prison de la Roquette at Wikimedia Commons
