= List of major crimes in France (before 1900) =

This page presents, in a non-exhaustive manner, some notorious French criminal cases whose development significantly took place before 1900. Those include regicide in the Middle Ages and violent crime in the 19th century.

== List ==
=== Until 1800 ===
Year (Note: Year or period during which the crime(s) were or are alleged to have been committed.)	Departement(s) (Note: According to the place(s) where the crime(s) were or are supposed to have been committed.)	Case	Summary	Comment	Culp.
466	Haute-Garonne	Assassination of Théodoric II	Assassination of Theodoric II, King of the Visigoths in 466 in Toulouse by his brother Euric.		CR
575	Pas-de-Calais	Assassination of Sigebert I	Assassination of Sigebert I, Merovingian king in December 575 in Vitry-en-Artois by two emissaries of Fredegund, Queen of Neustria.		CR
584	Seine-et-Marne	Assassination of Chilperic I	Assassination of Chilperic I, King of Neustria in September 584 in Chelles by one of his servants, a man named Falco.		CR
596	Uncertain	Assassination of Childebert II	Double assassination of Childebert II, King of Neustria, and his wife Faileuba in March 596.		
675	Seine-Maritime	Assassination of Childeric I	Assassination of Childeric I, King of Neustria, and his wife Bilichilde in 675 in the Broonne forest, probably victims of a terrible conspiracy.		
679	Meuse	Assassination of Dagobert II	Possible assassination of Dagobert II, King of Austrasia, in the Woëvre forest in 679.		
684	Uncertain	Assassination of Ebroin	Assassination of Ebroin, Mayor of the palace of Neustria in 684 by Ermenfroi, a nobleman whom he had stripped of his possessions.	Ebroin's cruelty and authoritarianism were such that he aroused resentment.	CR
741 ?	Uncertain	Assassination of Theudoald	The assassination of Theudoald, mayor of the palaces of Neustria and Burgundy, probably by the two sons of Charles Martel; Pépin and Carloman.		
768	Uncertain	Assassination of Waiofar	Assassination of Waiofar, Duke of Aquitaine and Gascony on the orders of Pepin the Short on 2 June 768.		CR
1199	Haute-Vienne	Assassination of Aimar V of Limoges	The murder of Aimar V of Limoges, probably by Philip of Cognac, the supposed illegitimate son of Richard the Lionheart in 1199.		
1200	Gironde	Murder of Mercadier	The murder of Mercadier, a mercenary leader, by a henchman of Brandin, a rival mercenary captain also in the service of John Lackland, King of England, on 10 April 1200.		CR
1316	Uncertain	Murder of Reginald of Bar	The possible poisoning of prelate Reginald of Bar, on 4 May 1316.		
1354	Orne	Assassination of Charles de la Cerda	Assassination of Charles de la Cerda, Constable of France, at the "Spinning Sow" inn in L'Aigle on 8 January 1354 by one of the henchmen of the King of Navarre, Jean de Soult, known as Le Bascon.		CR
1358	Paris	Assassination of Jean Ier Baillet	Assassination of Jean Ier Baillet, treasurer of the future King Charles V of France on 14 January 1358.		CR
1358	Paris	Murder of Étienne Marcel	The murder of Étienne Marcel, Provost of the Merchants of Paris, by the Parisian bourgeoisie who considered that he had gone too far in his opposition and that he had wanted to hand the city over to the English on 31 July 1358.		
1364	Nord	Execution of Siger II	Execution of Siger II of Enghien, Constable of France, at Le Quesnoy on 21 March 1364 on the orders of Albert of Bavaria, feudal sovereign of the counties of Holland, Hainaut, and Zeeland in the Netherlands.		CR
1388	Marne	Death of Pierre Aycelin de Montaigut	Death by possible poisoning of Pierre Aycelin de Montaigut, Cardinal of Laon, in Reims on 8 November 1388.		
1407	Paris	Assassination of Louis I of Orléans	The assassination of Louis I of Orléans, leader of the Armagnac party, on the orders of his cousin John the Fearless, Duke of Burgundy on 23 November 1407.	Jean sans Peur in turn is assassinated by Tanneguy du Châtel and Jean Louvet.	CR
1410–1414	Paris	Cabard and Miquelon Affair	A series of murders – one hundred and forty-three, it is said – attributed to Barnabé Cabard and Pierre Miquelon, and which were allegedly perpetrated on rue du Mont-Saint-Hilaire in Paris.	The case, which probably has a basis in truth, gave rise to the legend, which persisted in Paris until the 19th century, of a barber who killed his victims with his razor before storing the bodies in a cellar which he shared with his neighbor, a pastry chef, renowned for his succulent pies, which he actually made from the flesh of the unfortunate victims.	
1418	Paris	The Armagnac Affair	Bernard d'Armagnac, Count of Armagnac, Count of Charolais, Constable of France, leader of the Armagnac party, was killed on 12 June 1418, during the massacres organized by the people of the Duke of Burgundy, and led by the executioner Capeluche.		
1419	Seine-et-Marne	Assassination of John the Fearless	The assassination of John the Fearless, Duke of Burgundy, by Tanneguy du Châtel and Jean Louvet, on 10 September 1419 on the Montereau bridge.		CR
1429 ?	Uncertain	Jacques II de Bourbon-Préaux	Assassination of Jacques II de Bourbon-Preaux, a religious figure.		
1429-1430	Uncertain	Joan of Arc	Joan is condemned to be burned at the stake for heresy.	She became a heroine of French history, and a saint of the Catholic Church.	IR
1436–1440	Loire-Atlantique	Gilles de Rais	Heresy, sodomy and the murders of "one hundred and forty children, or more" attributed to Gilles de Rais, Joan of Arc's comrade-in-arms.	Over the centuries, Gilles de Rais would become a legendary figure, symbolizing Evil, the ogre of fairy tales.	
1455	Paris	François Villon	Death of a priest, Philippe Sermoise, killed during a brawl by the poet François Villon on 5 June 1455.	Villon, because of his chaotic life, is the archetype of the cursed poet.	CR
1473	Meurthe-et-Moselle	Nicholas I, Duke of Lorraine	Louis XI is suspected of having poisoned Nicolas of Lorraine, Duke of Lorraine on 27 July 1473.		
1556	Aisne	Robert IV de La Marck	Robert IV de La Marck, Marshal of France, died poisoned on the orders of Emperor Charles V.		CR
1563	Loiret	François, Duke of Guise	François de Guise, Duke of Lorraine and Catholic leader, was assassinated with a pistol shot fired by a Protestant gentleman, Jean de Poltrot de Méré.	De Poltrot de Méré is quartered.	CR
1567	Paris	Anne de Montmorency, 1st Duke of Montmorency	Anne de Montmorency, Constable of France, Catholic leader, was mortally wounded by a pistol shot in the back by a certain Robert Stuart.		
1569	Charente	Louis I, Prince of Condé	Louis I de Bourbon-Condé, Prince of Condé and Protestant leader, was assassinated after the Battle of Jarnac.		CR
1572	Paris	Gaspard II de Coligny	Assassination of Admiral de Coligny on 24 August 1572.	The affair is the prelude to the St. Bartholomew's Day massacre.	CR
1572	Paris	Petrus Ramus	Assassination of Pierre de La Ramée, Protestant humanist, philosopher, grammarian and logician on 26 August 1572.		
1573	Charente-Maritime?	François III Bouchard d'Aubeterre	Assassination of François III Bouchard d'Aubeterre in his bed, leader of the Protestant armies of Saintonge, present-day Saintes, one year after the St. Bartholomew's Day massacre.		
1579	Maine-et-Loire	Louis de Clermont, seigneur de Bussy	Louis de Bussy d'Amboise, favorite of Francis, Duke of Anjou, was assassinated at the Château de La Coutancière by the men of the Count of Montsoreau on 19 August 1579.		CR
1586	Paris	Jean-Édouard Du Monin	Death in mysterious circumstances of Jean-Édouard Du Monin, poet in 1586 in Gy.		
1588	Loir-et-Cher	Affaire du Duc de Guise	The assassination, on the orders of King Henry III, of the Duke of Guise on 23 December 1588 in Blois.	The case would inspire, more than three centuries later, a classic (1908) of silent cinema.	CR
1589	Hauts-de-Seine	Affaire Jacques Clément	Assassination of King Henry III on 1 August 1589 at Saint-Cloud. The king died the next day. The culprit is Drawn and Quartered.		CR
1592	Puy-de-Dôme	Affaire Babou de la Bourdaisière	Murder of Françoise Babou de la Bourdaisière, a noblewoman, on 9 June 1592, in Issoire, during a riot during the War of the Catholic League.	Her lover, Yves IV d'Alègre, suffered the same fate.	
1594	Paris	Affaire Jean Châtel	Attempted regicide against Henri IV, on 27 December 1594, Châtel is torn apart.	The attack led to the expulsion of the Jesuits from France.	CR
1598	Bourgogne-Franche-Comté (région)	Françoise Secrétain	A case of witchcraft.		
1603 ca.	Paris, Manche, Ille-et-Vilaine	Julien and Marguerite de Ravalet	Adultery and incest. The guilty parties are beheaded.		
1605 ca.-1611	Bouches-du-Rhône	Aix-en-Provence possessions	A case of witchcraft.. Louis Gaufridi, parish priest of Accoules, found guilty of having seduced Madeleine Demandolx de La Palud using witchcraft and magic, was burned alive on 30 April 1611 in Aix-en-Provence.		
1610	Paris	François Ravaillac	Assassination of King Henry IV of France on 14 May 1610. Ravaillac is quartered.		CR
1624 ?	Paris	Vital d'Audiguier	Murder of Vital d'Audiguier, poet and writer.		
1624	Paris	François de Molière d'Essertines	Murder of François de Molière d'Essertines, libertine writer, in March 1624, as a result of a duel.	His assassin was probably a man he considered a friend.	
1627	Vaucluse	Marc-Antoine de Malherbe	Raymond Audebert, a bourgeois from Aix, was killed in June 1624 by Marc-Antoine de Malherbe during a duel.	Sentenced to be beheaded, he nevertheless received letters of pardon. Malherbe was killed himself in a duel in 1627.	CR
1632	Vienne	Loudun possessions	The Ursuline convent in Loudun was bewitched by the priest Urbain Grandier, who was condemned to be burned at the stake.		
1646 ca.	Doubs	Adrienne d'Heur	A case of alleged witchcraft.		
1665	Paris	Affaire Tardieu	Murder of Lieutenant général de police Jacques Tardieu, a criminal, and his wife, the 24 August 1665 on rue de Harlay.		
1667	Hérault	Diane de Joannis de Chateaublanc	The assassination of Diane de Joannis de Chateaublanc, Marquise de Ganges, who died on 5 June 1667 in Ganges.	The case notably inspired a work (1813) by the Marquis de Sade and a story by Alexandre Dumas (ca. 1840).	CR
1679–1682	Paris	Affair of the Poisons	A series of poisonings in Paris during the reign of Louis XIV. The Madame de Brinvilliers was beheaded and then burned, and La Voisin was condemned to be burned at the stake.	The case has, to this day, inspired or formed part of the plot of several works of fiction.	
1689	Paris	Affaire Le Brun	Murder of Lady Mazel on 27 November 1689 at Rue Champollion. Le Brun, the faithful servant, is wrongly accused, and dies before the real culprit is discovered and confesses.		
1699	Paris	Tiquet case	Assassination attempt on her husband by Angélique-Nicole Carlier, Tiquet's wife, on 8 April 1699, a first attempt, three years earlier, was uncovered. Despite the husband's pleas to the king, Madame Tiquet was condemned to have her head cut off in the place de Grève, one of her henchmen to be hanged and the other to the galleys for life.		
1720 ca.-1726	Uncertain	Etienne-Benjamin Deschauffours	Establishment of a "pedophile network" and alleged murder. Deschauffours, convicted of sodomy, was sentenced to be burned at the stake.		
1730	Var	Catherine Cadière	Case of witchcraft.	The trial sparked numerous comments among contemporary authors and historians.	
1755	Paris	Marie Catherine Taperet	Assassination	The execution in the place de Grève was attended by a huge crowd.	
1756 ca.-1758	Saint-Domingue	François Mackandal	A series of poisonings. François Mackandal, a runaway slave, was condemned to be burned at the stake.	Mackandal, a figure surrounded by legends, would later become a symbol of resistance to the slave system.	
1757	Yvelines	Robert-François Damiens	Attempted regicide against Louis XV, on 5 January 1757 at the Palace of Versailles.	Damiens was the last person to suffer the punishment of being quartered (reserved for regicides) under the Ancien Régime.	CR
1761	Haute-Garonne	Affaire Calas	Apparent suicide of Marc-Antoine Calas on 13 October 1761 in Toulouse. His father, Jean Calas, disguised the scene as a murder to prevent his son's body from being "Claie d'infamie".	The case is rooted in the religious conflict between Protestants and Catholics, and has remained famous in particular because of the intervention of Voltaire.	IR
1762	Somme	Affaire Leroi de Valines	Arsenic poisoning of several people, including his father and mother who died as a result, by Charles-François-Joseph Leroi, squire, then sixteen years old, from June to September 1762 at Valines. The young man is condemned to be burned at the stake.		CR
1777	Paris	Antoine François Desrues	Poisoning (with poison mixed with chocolate) of a mother and her son in January and February 1777. Desrues was condemned to be broken on the wheel in the place de Grève, his body was burned and his ashes scattered.		CR
1779 ca.-1782	Ariège	Affaire Ferrage	A series of rapes in the Cescau region. Blaise Ferrage, nicknamed the "ogre of Gargas. He allegedly committed acts of cannibalism, and was condemned to be broken on the wheel and to have his body displayed on the Patibular fork.	The affair has given rise to local legends.	
1785–1792	Eure-et-Loir, Loiret, Loir-et-Cher, Essonne	The Chauffeurs d'Orgères	A series of robberies and murders committed mainly in the Beauce region by an organized gang of "drivers".	The "pasture thieves" were gangs of criminals who broke into people's homes at night and burned their feet on the embers of the fireplace to force them to reveal where they hid their savings. Examples of this practice, quite widespread from the Ancien régime until the 20th century, can be found.	CR
1789	Oise	Louis Michel Rieul Billon	A terror attack costing the lives of at least twenty people, perpetrated by watchmaker Louis Michel Rieul Billon, unhappy at having been excluded from a company of arquebusiers on 13 December 1789 at Senlis. Billon died, along with several soldiers, in the explosion of his house.		
1791	Paris	Nicolas Jacques Pelletier	Robbery with violence – the victim received several stab wounds – in a public place, on 14 October 1791.	Pelletier was, after the adoption of the Penal Code of 1791, the first person condemned to death to be executed by guillotine. The crowd, accustomed to capital executions that could sometimes last for hours, was disappointed by the speed and efficiency of Pelletier's execution thanks to the brand-new machine, and booed the executioner Sanson.	CR
1793	Paris	Affaire Charlotte Corday	Assassination of Jean-Paul Marat, montagnard deputy to the Convention, on 13 July 1793.	The case notably inspired a painting by Jacques-Louis David, painted in 1793, that is to say the very year of the crime.	CC
1795–1796	Nord	Antoine-Joseph Moneuse	A series of robberies and murders committed by "drivers" in the North of France and in the present-day Belgian province of Hainaut.		CD
1796	Seine-et-Marne	Affaire du Courrier de Lyon	Attack on the malle-poste traveling from Paris to Lyon, during the night of the 27 to 28 April 1796 near Vert-Saint-Denis, during which two postillonswere killed. Three men were sentenced to death and guillotined.	The case, which occurred during the French Directoryperiod, resulted in the execution of Joseph Lesurques, appearing to be a miscarriage of justice, and became a symbol of hasty and imprecise justice. It led to a decree of December 1868concerning the benefit of the doubt and the rehabilitation of convicts found innocent after their death. Several works have been inspired by it, including a film, released in 1937.	
1800	Finistère	Yves Marie Audrein	Assassination of Yves Marie Audrein, Bishop of Quimper and regicide member of the National Convention on 19 November 1800 by Michel-Armand de Cornouaille.	The reason for his assassination was due to the fact that he voted for the execution of Louis XVI.	CR
1800	Paris	Plot of the rue Saint-Nicaise	This attack was due to a royalist conspiracy, on the night of 24 December 1800, aimed at assassinating Napoleon Bonaparte, First Consul of France since the coup of 18 Brumaire in Paris. In total, 22 people died, 28 were seriously injured, 8 were killed instantly and about a hundred were wounded, 46 houses on rue Saint-Nicaise were destroyed or rendered uninhabitable.	"Conspiracy of the Infernal Machine"	CC

=== 19th century ===
Year	Département(s)	Case	Summary	Notes	Culp.
1804	Vosges	Affaire des Cardinaux de Vittel	Suspicion de meurtres, à la suite de la découverte d'ossements le 10 mars 1804 à Vittel. Cinq membres d'une famille sont reconnus coupables et sont exécutés. Suspicion of murders, following the discovery of bones on 10 March 1804. In Vittel, five members of a family were found guilty and executed.	According to contemporary expert opinions, the bones found were, in fact, very old and dated back to the Merovingian dynasty.	IR
1804	Paris	Affaire du duc d'Enghien	Abduction and execution, on the orders of Napoleon Bonaparte, future emperor, of the Duke of Enghien, cousin of Louis XVI, on the night of 21 March 1804.		CR
1805–1830	Ardèche	L'Auberge rouge	A series of murders allegedly committed on travellers by the couple Pierre and Marie Martin, owners of an inn in Peyrebeille, in the commune of Lanarce.	The case inspired a film in 1951 and another in 2007.	CD
1814–1820	Rhône	Affaire Lelièvre	Identity theft, alleged poisoning of his successive wives, and child abduction. Pierre Étienne Gabriel Lelièvre, known as Chevallier, is condemned to the scaffold.		
1814	Paris	Affaire Dautun	Murder of Jeanne-Marie Dautun on 16 July 1814 at 7 Rue de la Grange-Batelière and, in November of the same year, of Auguste Dautun, whose body was dismembered and whose pieces were found scattered throughout Paris. Charles Dautun, nephew of the first victim and brother of the second, was found guilty and executed in the Place de Grève on 29 March 1815.		CD
1815	Vaucluse	Affaire Guillaume Brune	Assassination of Marshal Guillaume Brune.		
1815	Lot	Affaire Ney	Arrest of Marshal Ney at the Château de Bessonies, escorted to Paris, brought to trial for high treason because he had joined Napoleon during the Hundred Days.	He was shot and killed on 7 December 1815.	CC
1817	Eure	Affaire Wilfrid Regnault	Murder of a widow in a bourgeois house in Amfreville-la-Campagne, a village in Normandy.	The case made headlines in the legal news of Restoration France because beyond the facts there were political considerations, since the person accused of the crime (a man named Wilfrid Regnault) was a republican who had participated in the September Massacres during the Revolution.	CD
1817	Aveyron	Affaire Fualdès	The brutal assassination of Antoine Bernardin Fualdès, former imperial prosecutor of the Aveyron, department, on 19 March 1817 in Rodez.	The case made headlines in the legal news of Restoration France. Political considerations were intertwined, as the victim was accused of being a Bonapartist, his attackers were royalist, and the initial trial that sentenced them to death was overturned at the end of 1817. Victor Hugo mentioned it in Les Misérables, and Balzac also alludes to it. The case inspired a Lament, famous in its time, whose melody would be reused in similar songs illustrating numerous other criminal cases.	CD
1819	Paris	Affaire des piqueurs de fesses	A series of physical assaults committed by one or more people against women (mostly in Paris) during the second half of 1819	The case made headlines in the legal news of Restoration France. Only one person was arrested and convicted, although it seems doubtful that this series of attacks (an estimated 400 victims) was the work of a single individual.	CD
1820	Paris	Affaire Louvel	Assassination of the Charles Ferdinand, Duke of Berry, on the night of the 13 to 14 February 1820.		CC
1820	Paris	Affaire Denis Decrès	Denis Decrès, former Minister of the Navy under Napoleon I, died as a result of a fire started by a servant who wanted to kill him to rob him.		
1822	Isère	Affaire Mingrat	Rape and murder of Marie Gérin, wife of Charnalet, by the priest Antoine Mingrat, on the night of the 8 to 9 May 1822 in the presbytery of Saint-Quentin. Sentenced to death in absentia, Mingrat finds refuge in Sardinia.		
1823	Hauts-de-Seine	Affaire Castaing	The heinous assassination, by poisoning, of Auguste Ballet, on 1 June 1823 in Saint-Cloud.		CD
1824	Essonne	Affaire Léger	The murder of a twelve-year-old girl, Aimée-Constance Debully, accompanied by an act of cannibalism , committed by Antoine Léger, the "werewolf of the Charbonnière cave", on 10 August 1824 in Itteville (former department of Seine-et-Oise).		CC
1824	Paris	Affaire Papavoine	The murder, before the eyes of their mother, of Charles and Auguste Gerbod – or Gerbault – aged six and five respectively, on 10 October 1824 in the Bois de Vincennes. Louis-Auguste Papavoine, found guilty of the crime, is condemned to the scaffold.		
1825	Indre-et-Loire	Affaire Courier	Assassination of pamphleteer Paul-Louis Courier, on 10 April 1825 near Véretz.	The case inspired a film, released in 1949.	CC
1825	Paris	Affaire Cornier	Murder of a nineteen-month-old girl by a maid, on 4 November 1825 at Rue de la Pépinière. Found guilty of voluntary homicide committed without premeditation, Henriette Cornier was sentenced to penal labour for life and to Flétrissure.		
1827	Paris	Affaire de l'Abbé Contrafatto	Sexual abuse of a 5-year-old girl , Hortense Le Bon, on 29 July 1827 at 9 rue Coquenard. Dom Giuseppe (Joseph) Contrafatto,a Sicilian, is condemned to forced labor for life and to branding.		
1827	Paris	Murder of Aimée Millot	The murderof Aimée Millot, shepherdess of Ivry, by Honoré Ulbach, on 25 May 1827.	The case notably inspired Victor Hugo.	CC
1829–1831	Ardennes, Yvelines	Affaire Benoît	A mother was assassinated on 9 November 1829, in Vouziers. The second murder was committed on 22 July 1831, in Versailles carried out by Nicolas-Théodore-Frédéric Benoît, a nineteen-year-old who was the assassin's companion; Benoît allegedly claimed the murderer had confessed to him and then extorted him.	Convicted of parricide, Benoît avoided having his wrist cut off – a punishment recently abolished for this type of crime – and was led to the scaffold barefoot and in his shirt, his head covered with a black veil. The case inspired the 1995 play Hyenas by Christian Siméon.	CD
1829–1835	Yvelines, Seine	Affaire Lacenaire	Series of robberies and murders.	The character of Lacenaire, poet-assassin, is evoked, in particular, in Marcel Carné's film Les Enfants du paradis (1945), and his life inspired another, released in 1990.	CC
1832 ?	Uncertain	Claude Gueux		The affair inspired a short story by Victor Hugo.	CD
1832	Paris	Évariste Galois	Tragic death of Évariste Galois, a 20-year-old, renowned mathematician, following a duel.	The identity of his opponent remains unknown.	
1833–1851	Morbihan	Hélène Jégado	Series of murders by poisoning committed in Brittany.		CC
1835	Calvados	Pierre Rivière	The murder of his mother, sister, and brother by a young Norman peasant, using a sickle, on 3 June 1835.	The case led to one of the first attempts at a scientific, clinical explanation of a crime. A memoir written by Rivière was the subject of a seminar led by Michel Foucault in 1973, which resulted in a collective work. The story was adapted into a film in 1976 under the title Moi, Pierre Rivière, ayant égorgé ma mère, ma sœur et mon frère....	CC
1835	Paris	Giuseppe Marco Fieschi	An attack targeting Louis Philippe I and the royal family, which cost the lives of eighteen people, on 28 July 1835, at boulevard du Temple.		CD
1836	Paris	Louis Alibaud	Attempted assassination of King Louis-Philippe, on 25 June 1836 at the Tuileries.		CC
1838	Paris	Affaire Soufflard and Lesage	The murder of Mrs. Renault, on 5 June 1838 at 31 Rue du Temple.		
1838	Ain	Sébastien Peytel	The alleged murder of a literary critic's wife and her servant on 1 November 1838 in Belley.	Peytel, despite the support of Honoré de Balzac and Alphonse de Lamartine among others, was led to the scaffold.	CD
1840	Corrèze	Affaire Lafarge	A man was poisoned by his wife on 14 January 1840 at Beyssac.		CD
1840	Gironde / Seine	Pierre-Vincent Eliçabide	Murder of a mother and her daughter on 10 May 1840 in Artigues (Gironde) as well as his son a few days earlier in the village of La Villette, near Paris.	Pierre-Vincent Eliçabide, found guilty of a triple murder of Joseph Anizat (in Paris), Marie Anizat and Mathilde Anizat (in Artigues), was guillotined on 3 November 1840 in the courtyard of the Hâ prison, located in Bordeaux.	CD
1840	Haute-Loire	The Besson affair (or the Chamblas affair)	Assassination of 34-year-old Louis Vilhardin de Marcellange, on 1 September 1840, at the Château de Chamblas in Saint-Étienne-Lardeyrol, shot dead by Jacques Besson his former servant .	He was sentenced to death in Lyon and guillotined on 28 March 1843 at the Place du Martouret in Le Puy-en-Velay.	CD
1844	Val-d'Oise	Affaire Rousselet	Assassination of André Donon-Cadot, banker, on 15 January 1844 in Pontoise in his office by Pierre Rousselet.	Rousselet sentenced to hard labor for life.	
1847	Haute-Garonne	Murder of Cécile Combettes	Rape and murder of a 15-year-old girl	The alleged perpetrator, was sentenced to hard labour where he died three years later, although he is now thought to have perhaps been innocent.	
1847	Gironde	Affaire Lesnier	Suspicious death of Claude Gay, a man in his seventies, in November 1847at Le Fieu. The schoolteacher Jean-François Lesnier is found guilty of the crime..	Lesnier narrowly escaped the death penalty and was sent to the penal colony for seven years before being retried and acquitted in 1855.	
1850	Saône-et-Loire	Claude Montcharmont	Murder of two people, including a police officer, two days apart, by a poacher from Saint-Prix.		CC
1851	Rhône	Affaire Jobard	Josephine-Anaïs Ricard was killed in Lyonon 15 September 1851, during a performance at the théâtre des Célestins, a stabbing by Antoine Emmanuel Jobard.	He was sentenced to hard labor in 1852.	
1855–1861	Ain	Martin Dumollard	Series of rapes and murders of young domestic workers in the Côtière de l'Ain.		CC
1857	Paris	Jean-Louis Verger	The assassination of the Archbishop of Paris by a priest, on 3 January 1857.		CD
1857	Eure	Affaire de Jeufosse	The voluntary homicide of Émile Guillot by a gamekeeper, om 12 June 1857 in Saint-Aubin-sur-Gaillon.		ID
1858	Paris	Attempted attack against Emperor Napoleon III	Felice Orsini and his accomplices threw bombs to kill Napoléon III, emperor and former first president of the republic. 12 people died and 156 were injured.	Only Orsini was sentenced to death and guillotined.	CC
1859	Rhône	The Saint-Cyr Assassins Affair	The triple rape and murder of the Gayet women, on the night of the 14 to 15 October 1859 in Saint-Cyr-au-Mont-d'Or.		CD
1867	Seine-et-Marne	Jean-Charles-Alphonse Avinain	Assassination of Isidore Vincent and a man named Duguet.	The case remains famous for the phrase "Gentlemen, never confess! Never confess!", uttered by Avinain before his execution.	CD
1868	Bouches-du-Rhône	Affaire des empoisonneuses de Marseille	Three women, Marie Autran, Joséphique Duguet and Roseline Salvago, poison their respective husbands with the help of a tarot card reader Fanny Lambert and a herbalist Jean-François Joye.	Sentences to forced labor for Fanny Lambert, Jean-François Joye, Marie Autran and Joséphine Duguet, and 20 years for Roseline Salvago.	
1869	Haut-Rhin	Jean-Baptiste Troppmann	"Pantin Massacre": murder of eight members of the Kinck family.	The memory of the case persisted for several decades. Redureau, in 1913, for example, was dubbed, after his crimes, the "Fifteen-Year-Old Troppmann".	CC
1870	Paris	Affaire Salmon	Yvan Salmon, a journalist, was killed by Pierre-Napoléon Bonaparte, Napoleon Bonaparte's nephew, for calling the Bonapartes ferocious beasts on 10 January 1870.		
1870	Dordogne	Hautefaye case	Torture and execution by immolation of Alain de Monéys, on 16 August 1870 in Hautefaye, by several villagers.	The case takes place in the context of the Franco-Prussian War and the heightened passions it provoked in the population of a small village, following a misunderstanding.	CD
1871	Paris	Affaire Bonjean	Execution of Louis Bernard Bonjean, first president of the chamber at the Cour de cassation on 24 May 1871.	With him perished at the same time, the archbishop of Paris Georges Darboy, the abbot Gaspard Deguerry, curate of the la Madeleine, the abbot Surat archdeacon of Notre-Dame and the journalist Gustave Chaudey.	
1876–1879	Paris	Affaire Prévost	Assassination of his mistress Adèle Blondin on 27 February 1876, and of 38-year-old Alexandre Lenoble, jewelry broker, in 1879 by Victor Prévost, peace officer.	He was guillotined on 19 January 1880. He is suspected of having committed two other murders. The fact that he dismembered the two corpses in an attempt to dispose of them shocked public opinion.	CC
1877–1884	Savoie, Paris, Seine-Saint-Denis	Affaire Pel	A series of murders by poisoning. Albert Pel, convicted of only one murder, is suspected of having committed four others.		CD
1877–1901	Vienne	Affaire Monnier	The "Poitiers sequestered woman": Blanche Monnier was held captive by her mother for twenty-four years in appalling conditions. The case was only discovered on 23 May 1901.	La Séquestrée de Poitiers was recounted by André Gide in 1930.	
1880	Paris	Affaire Menesclou	The rape and murder of a four-year-old girl, whose body was then dismembered and partially burned, by a young man in his twenties, Louis Menesclou, on 15 April 1880 at Rue de Grenelle.		
1882	Yvelines	Murder of Louis Aubert	The assassination of Louis Aubert by the Fenayrou family.	"The Pecq Crime"	CD
26 September–26 September	Saône-et-Loire	Black Band	Series of anarchist attacks by the Bande noire.		
1884	Bouches-du-Rhône	Marie Deluil-Martiny	The assassination of Marie Deluil-Martiny by an anarchist on 27 February 1884 near Marseille.		
1886	Sologne	Murder of Marie Lebon	Matricide committed by Georgette Thomas with the help of her two brothers and her husband.	The Thomas brothers were sentenced to life imprisonment while Georgette Thomas and her husband were executed on 27 January 1887.	CC
1887	Paris	Henri Pranzini	"Triple murder on Rue Montaigne": the heinous murders of two women and a little girl on 18 March 1887.	The case remains associated with Thérèse Martin, future Saint Thérèse de Lisieux and future Doctor of the Church, who prayed, before entering the Carmel, in the hope of Pranzini's conversion before his execution, and for whom this experience would be decisive.	CD
1889	Paris	Gouffé Case	"Millery's Bloody Trunk": a heinous murder, on 26 July 1889, of bailiff Toussaint-Augustin Gouffé, by the couple Michel Eyraud and Gabrielle Bompard.	The case, with its twists and turns giving rise to "scoops" before the term existed in Le Petit Parisien, is among the most publicized of the second half of the 19th century in France.	CC
1891	Courbevoie	Courbevoie Crime	Murder of an elderly woman to steal her money.	Violent murder punished by three death sentences.	
1891–1892	Paris	Affaire Ravachol	Series of anarchist attacks.		CC
1892–1894	Paris	Affaire Henry	Anarchist attacks, on 8 November 1892 at Rue des Bons-Enfants and, on 12 February 1894, at the Terminus café, gare Saint-Lazare.		
1894–1898	Ain, Allier, Ardèche, Côte-d'Or, Drôme, Haute-Loire, Isère, Rhône, Savoie, Tarn, Var	Affaire Vacher	A series of murders committed in southeastern France between May 1894 and June 1897. Convicted in 1898 for only one murder – that of young Victor Portalier, on 31 August 1895. In Bénonces in the Ain region, Vacher, nicknamed the "Shepherd Killer", confessed to eleven murders in total, and was suspected of having committed thirty or more.	The case provided one of the first examples of criminal profiling. During the course of the investigation, a law was passed requiring that suspects be informed of their right to legal counsel during proceedings. The case sparked debate on the topic of "mental health and crime" and raised questions about the issue of vagrancy in the late 19th century. Notably, the case inspired the 1976 film Le Juge et l'Assassin.	CC
1894	Rhône	Affaire Caserio	Assassination of President Sadi Carnot on 24 June 1894 in Lyon by the Italian anarchist Sante Geronimo Caserio.		CC
1898	Gard	Affaire Gayte	Mrs. Demarès de Vaucrose, a 68-year-old widow, was strangled in her bed in Saint-Pons-la-Calm on the night of the 23 to 24 August 1898 by Barthélémy-Auguste Gayte.	He is sentenced on 5 March 1901 to twenty years of hard labour.	
1898–1906	Pas-de-Calais	The Bande Pollet	Murders, robberies, extortion, torture and other crimes in northern France and Belgium.		CD

== Notes and references ==
=== Notes ===
==== Culprit ====
Guilt of the main defendant or group of defendants:

- for cases that have been judged, according to the latest verdict:

CC (Guilt Confirmed) : The accused was found guilty even though their lawyer (or, failing that, the accused themselves) had not argued for acquittal.

CD (Guilt Declared) : The accused was found guilty even though their lawyer (or, failing that, the accused themselves) had argued for acquittal.

ID (Innocence Declared) : The accused was acquitted, but no irrefutable proof of their innocence had been submitted to the case file.

NL (Dismissal) : Dismissal of charges

- For cases that will never go to trial, based on irrefutable evidence known to the general public:

CR (Reputed Guilt)

IR (Reputed Innocence)

== Bibliography ==
=== 18th century and before ===
- François Gayot de Pitaval, Causes célèbres et intéressantes, avec les jugements qui les ont décidées, Paris, 1739–1750, 20 vol., continué par de J.C. de La Ville, Paris, 1769, 4 vol. Rééd. Amsterdam, Van den Berghen – Liège, Bassompierre, 1775. Et continué par Richer, Amsterdam, Michel Rhey, 1771–1788, 22 vol.
- Nicolas-Toussaint Des Essarts, Causes célèbres, curieuses et intéressantes, de toutes les cours souveraines du royaume, avec les jugemens qui les ont décidées, Paris, 1773–1789, 196 vol.

=== 19th century ===
- Annuaire historique universel pour…, 1818–1861. Commencé par Charles-Louis Lesur. Contient une « chronique offrant les événements les plus piquants, les causes les plus célèbres, etc. », où sont résumés, notamment, les procès les plus marquants de l'année concernée (par exemple l'affaire Papavoine en 1824). Volumes en ligne sur Gallica.
- Causes criminelles célèbres du XIXe siècle, rédigées par une société d'avocats, Paris, H. Langlois fils, 1827–1828. Tome premier, 420 p. Tome second, 390 p. Tome troisième, 464 p. Tome quatrième, 395 p. En ligne sur Gallica.
- Jean-Baptiste-Joseph Champagnac, Chronique du crime et de l'innocence, recueil des événements les plus tragiques, empoisonnements, assassinats, massacres, parricides…, Paris, Ménard, 1833. 8 tomes en ligne sur Gallica.
- Edme-Théodore Bourg, dit Saint-Edme (dir.), Répertoire général des causes célèbres, Paris, L. Rosier, 1834–1836. 13 + 3 volumes en ligne sur Gallica.
- Ch. Dupressoir, Drames judiciaires. Scènes correctionnelles. Causes célèbres de tous les peuples, Paris, Librairie ethnographique, 1849. Première série, p. mult. En ligne sur Gallica.
- Armand Fouquier, Causes célèbres de tous les peuples, Paris, Lebrun, 1858–1867. Livraisons 1–25, p. mult. Livraisons 26–50, p. mult. Livraisons 51–75, p. mult. Livraisons 76–100, p. mult. Livraisons 101–114, p. mult. Livraisons 115–139, p. mult. Affaires Armand et La Pommerais (« Les procès du jour », 1864), et de Épisode des journées de juin 1848 à l'affaire Castaing (No. 249), p. mult. En ligne sur Gallica.

== Television programmes ==
- 1955 to 1969: En votre âme et conscience

== Radio broadcasts ==
- L'Heure du crime, broadcast on RTL from 2010, hosted by Jacques Pradel.

== See also ==
- List of major crimes in France
