= Lisandro =

Lisandro, or Lysandro, is a male first name, particularly common in Argentina. It is occasionally a surname as well. Its origin comes from the Ancient Greek language, and is believed to have been popularized thanks to Lysander, a Spartan military and political leader.

It may refer to:

== People ==
- Lisandro Alvarado (1858–1929), Venezuelan physician, naturalist, historian, ethnologist and linguist
- Lisandro Alonso (born 1975), Argentine film director
- Lisandro Duque Naranjo (born 1943), Colombian film director and screenwriter
- Lisandro Elias "Leloy" Estrada Claudio (born 1984), Filipino academic, author, and political commentator
- Lisandro Macarrulla (born 1956), Dominican Republic businessman and entrepreneurial leader
- Lisandro Otero (1932–2008), Cuban novelist and journalist
- Jeff Lisandro, Italian Australian professional poker player
- José Lisandro Lascarro, or Pastor Alape (born 1959), Colombian guerrilla leader

=== Musicians ===
- Lisandro Abadie (born 1974), Argentine bass-baritone
- Lisandro Aristimuño (born 1978), Argentine musician and singer-songwriter
- Lisandro Cuxi (born 1999), Cape Verdean singer-songwriter and dancer
- Lisandro Fiks (born 1971), Argentine director, actor, playwright and musician
- Lisandro Meza (1937–2023), Colombian singer and accordionist

=== Politicians ===
- Lisandro Bormioli (born 1975), Argentine politician
- Lisandro Campos Córdova (born 1957), Mexican politician
- Lisandro Catalán (born 1971), Argentine politician
- Lisandro Cruz (1911–1997), Chilean lawyer and politician
- Lisandro de la Torre (1868–1939), Argentine politician
- Lisandro Mauricio Arias (born 1965), Honduran politician
- Lisandro Nieri (born 1972), Argentine politician
- Manuel Lisandro Barillas Bercián (1845–1907), Guatemalan general and acting president of Guatemala

=== Sports ===
- Lisandro Alzugaray (born 1990), Argentine footballer
- Lisandro Arbizu (born 1971), Argentine rugby union player
- Lisandro Cabrera (born 1998), Argentine footballer
- Lisandro Henríquez (born 1982), Chilean footballer
- Lisandro López (footballer, born 1983), Argentine footballer
- Lisandro López (footballer, born 1989), Argentine footballer
- Lisandro Magallán (born 1993), Argentine footballer
- Lisandro Martínez (born 1998), Argentine footballer
- Lisandro Moyano (born 1983), Argentine footballer
- Lisandro Pérez (born 2000), Venezuelan footballer
- Lisandro Peris (1891–1951), a Cuban/Spanish footballer
- Lisandro Sacripanti (born 1982), Argentine footballer
- Lisandro Semedo (born 1996), Portuguese footballer
- Lisandro Sugezky (born 1945), Argentine sports shooter
- Lisandro Trenidad (born 1991), Netherlands Antillean footballer

== Locations ==
- Lisandro de la Torre, a barrio in northeast Rosario, Argentina
- Lisandro Formation, Cretaceous rocks of the Neuquén Group in Argentina
- Lisandro Olmos, town in Argentina
- Bartolomeu Lysandro Airport in Campos dos Goytacazes, Brazil

== See also ==
- Lysandros (disambiguation)
- Lisandro (disambiguation)
- Lysander (disambiguation)
