= Lysander (disambiguation) =

Lysander (died 395 BC) was a naval admiral of ancient Sparta.

Lysander may also refer to:

== People ==
- Lysander, ally of the Spartan king Agis IV (c. 265 BC – 241 BC)
- Lysander (given name), list of people and fictional characters with this name
- Lysander (Shakespeare), character in Shakespeare's A Midsummer Night's Dream
- Lysander Spooner (1808 – 1887), early American entrepreneur and legal theorist
- Albert Lysander (1875–1956), Swedish Lutheran priest
- Rick Lysander (born 1953), American professional baseball pitcher

== Military ==
- HMS Lysander, several ships of the British Royal Navy
- Westland Lysander, British military aircraft of the 1930s and 1940s

== Places ==
- Lysander, New York

== Locomotives ==
- GWR 4073 "Castle" Class No.5079 "Lysander"

== See also ==
- Lysander (boat)
- Lysandre (disambiguation)
- Lysandros (disambiguation)
- Lisandro (disambiguation)
