= Lysander (given name) =

Lysander is a masculine given name. Of Greek origin, its meaning is "liberator". The name comprises the elements "lysis" (freedom) and "andros" (man).

== Notable people with this name ==
- Lysander (c. 454 BC – 395 BC), leading Spartan commander and statesman during the Peloponnesian War
- Lysander, ally of the Spartan king Agis IV (c. 265 BC – 241 BC)
- Albert Lysander (1875–1956), Swedish Lutheran priest; one of the early pioneers of the Swedish High Church movement
- Lysander Button (1810–1898), American inventor
- Lysander Farrar (1812–1876), New York politician
- Lysander Spooner (1808–1887), American political activist and legal theorist

== Fictional characters ==
- Lysander I and IV, monarchs in the fictional CoDominium universe
- Lysander (Shakespeare), character in Shakespeare's A Midsummer Night's Dream
- Lysander, a character in the video game Diablo II
- Lysander au Lune, a character introduced in the second book of Pierce Brown's Red Rising series.
- Lysandre, the main antagonist in the video games Pokémon X and Y
- Lysander Scamander, son of Luna Lovegood and Rolph Scamander in the Harry Potter series
- Lysander Stark, counterfeiter in The Adventure of the Engineer's Thumb

== See also ==
- Lysander (disambiguation)
