= Lysandre =

Lysandre is a French spelling of the Greek name Lysander, and may refer to:

- Lysandre, a character in les Amours de Lysandre et Caliste, by Vital d'Audiguier Paris, 1615
- Lysandre, a character in Corneille's comedy La Galerie du Palais, 1632
- Lysandre, a fictional character and the main antagonist in Pokémon X and Y
- Lysandre (Christopher Owens album), the debut solo album of Christopher Owens

== See also ==
- Lysander (disambiguation)
