= Major crimes =

Major crimes may refer to:

- A major crime

== In justice & law ==
- List of major crimes in France
- List of major crimes in Italy
- List of major crimes in Singapore
- List of major crimes in the United Kingdom
- Major case squad (major crimes unit), a division within some police departments
- Major Crimes Act, by the U.S. Congress in 1885

== Other ==
- Major Crimes (TV series), an American drama television series
