= Pont de Brotonne =

Brotonne Bridge Pont de Brotonne
- Pont de Brotonne
- Coordinates: 49.5206117°N 0.7471561°E
- Carries: 4 lanes of A 29
- Crosses: Seine
- Locale: Caudebec-en-Caux, Seine-Maritime, Normandy, France

Characteristics
- Design: Cable-stayed bridge
- Total length: 1,278 metres (1,398 yd)
- Height: 125 metres (137 yd) (pylons)
- Longest span: 320 metres (350 yd)
- Clearance above: 50 metres (55 yd)

History
- Construction start: 1977

Statistics
- Toll: None

Location
- Interactive map of Brotonne Bridge

The Brotonne Bridge (pont de Brotonne) is a bridge in the region of Normandy in France, situated between the cities of Le Havre and Rouen.

== History ==
The bridge was constructed in 1977 and crosses the Seine, to the east of the commune of Caudebec-en-Caux. Its construction was financed by the General council of Seine-Maritime for the purpose of opening up the Pays de Caux and assuring a connection between the commune of Yvetot and the A13 autoroute by way of the forêt de Brotonne (Brotonne forest), from which the bridge gets its name. Only two bridges are located further downstream the Seine from the pont de Brotonne: the Pont de Tancarville and the Pont de Normandie.

The bridge is a cable-stayed bridge (specifically of the fan design), whose principal span reaches 320 metres (350 yd) and is made of prestressed concrete. It is considered an engineering feat and was the first bridge of this type in the world.

The bridge was a toll bridge until 2006.

The bridge is considered to be the inspiration for the Sunshine Skyway Bridge in Florida.

== Dimensions ==
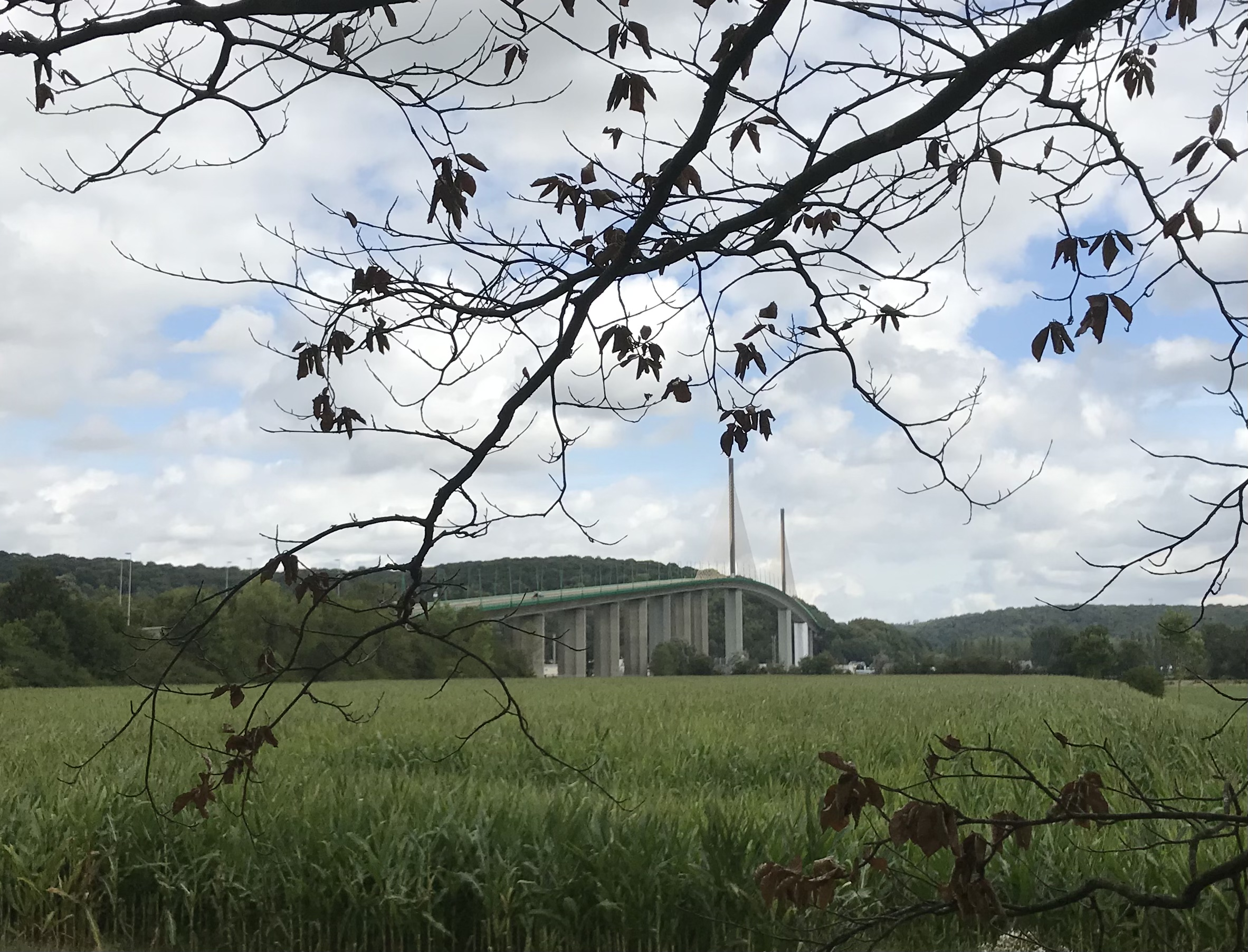
View of bridge span from ground level

- Length: 1,278 metres (1,398 yd)
- Pylons: 125 metres (137 yd)
- Thickness of roadway: 3.80 metres (4.16 yd)
- Carriageways lie 50 metres (55 yd) above the Seine (maritime clearance)
- Carries four lanes

== See also ==
- List of bridges in France
