= Victor Prévost =

French murderer and suspected serial killer (1836–1880)

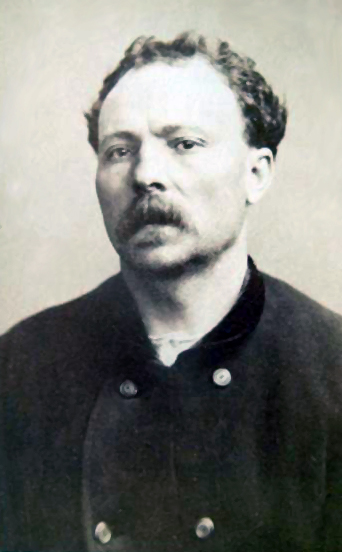
- Mugshot from Prévost's arrest in 1879
- Born: Victor Joseph Prévost; 11 December 1836; Mormant, Île-de-France, France
- Died: 19 January 1880 (aged 43); Paris, France
- Cause of death: Guillotined
- Other names: "The Butcher of La Chapelle" "The Handsome Man"
- Conviction: Murder
- Penalty: Death

Details
- Victims: 2–4
- Span of crimes: 1867–1879
- Country: France
- State: Île-de-France
- Date apprehended: 1879

Victor Joseph Prévost (11 December 1836 – 19 January 1880), also known as The La Chapelle Butcher and The Handsome Man, was a French former butcher, cuirassier, cent-gardes, policeman, murderer and possible serial killer. He killed at least two victims, and tried to hide his crimes by decapitating his victims. Because of Prévost's profession as a policeman in his neighbourhood where he committed his crimes, his military past in a renowned elite corps and what he did with the victims' bodies, his case caused a great impact on the contemporary public: "Since the Abadie trial, (Note: The trial of a juvenile gang convicted of the murder of an innkeeper in 1879 - see Edgar Degas.) no criminal case had interested the French public as much."

== Biography ==
=== Youth and apprenticeship ===
Victor Joseph Prévost was born in Mormant, Seine-et-Marne, France on 11 December 1836. His father, Pierre, was a coachman, and his mother, Barbe (née Griette), was unemployed. He had two older brothers: Leon and Adolphe, four and two years older respectively. From birth, Prévost was afflicted with bulimia, particularly inherited from his father, which remained with him for the rest of his life.

At the age of 14, Prévost's parents placed him as an apprentice at a trellis manufacturer on Rue Saint-Jacques in Paris. Although surrounded by young girls at an early age, young Prévost was treated harshly, sleeping on a bed without a mattress and having to work as much as an adult. Prévost's boss brutalized him and, to punish him for his bulimia, which he mistook for simple greed, reduced his daily food portions. Then, hungry, Prévost stole a piece of bread, but was caught and punished by being struck with a whip reserved for the dog. That same evening, while Prévost helped his employer to put up fences over a small yard, he made it swing through a frame whose piece of glass plowed his hands and face. From that moment, Prévost had only one idea in mind: to escape his ordeal.

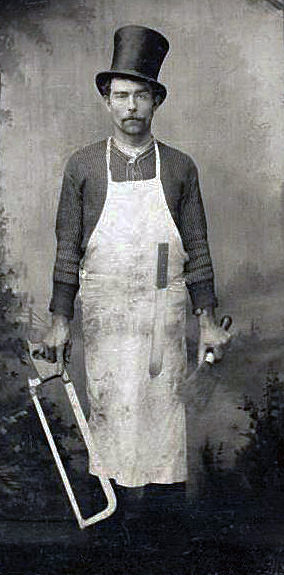
Contemporary butcher's clothing

Prévost was naturally kind and considerate. While in the Jardin du Luxembourg, he saw a large boy steal a toy accordion from a smaller one, which he managed to get back and return to the child. Aware of his strength, Prévost never hesitated to help the many push carriages that had difficulties in climbing the steep slope of the Rue de la Montagne-Sainte-Geneviève. One day, while running an errand for his boss, Prévost saw the cart of a milkman hit a boy of his age carrying a rack full of meat. While the milkman ran away, Prévost helped the young victim get up and, finding that the boy was no longer in shape to resume his service, he loaded the heavy piece of meat on his head effortlessly and then delivered it to its recipient, a butcher holding a shop on Rue Mouffetard. This incident gave him the idea of his Herculean strength while he was still a teenager.

There are different versions of what happened next. According to Ernest Raynaud, Prévost was suddenly taken with a passion for the bloody universe he discovered then: the clerks were cutting up the animals that had just been slaughtered and it was a debauchery of cut flesh and blood. Prévost was fascinated and could not help himself but participate in the carnage: he took a knife and, although a novice, cut off a shred of veal. According to Gustave Macé, things happened in a simpler manner: the delivery brought by Prévost to the butcher had come from consumption-stricken cows, which were prohibited from sale and would have landed Prévost in trouble if he was caught by police. Whichever case might be, the butcher was delighted when young Prévost asked him for a job. Soon after, his employer and the butcher had a meeting and agreed to exchange apprentices.

The following day, Prévost began his apprenticeship as a butcher. In the butcher shop, masters and clerks alike had huge appetites, regularly eating meat and bread, and drinking wine and even liquors, which were also available at their discretion, which was perfect for Prévost's ogre appetite. The task was tough, as the apprentices had to transfer heavy loads between Les Halles or private slaughterhouses and retailers, sometimes over long distances, but Prévost did not lack the strength. He quickly learned how to butcher animals, and became an expert in skinning and deboning. He loved the smell of blood, and seemed to experience a real pleasure to handle meat. In the shop, he spoke Louchébem and behaved rather freely, with the cashier (a mistress of the boss) and one of the female servants quickly becoming attracted to the handsome apprentice. Violent jealousies soon followed, resulting in Prévost's dismissal. Shortly after, he found work in a school on Rue Saint-Honoré. As soon as he arrived, he again began to be swarmed by female attention, which earned him the nickname "The Handsome Man" among his colleagues. In fact, it is rather him who succumbed to the domestic workers' advances, that he did nothing to provoke.

=== Cuirassier and cent-garde ===
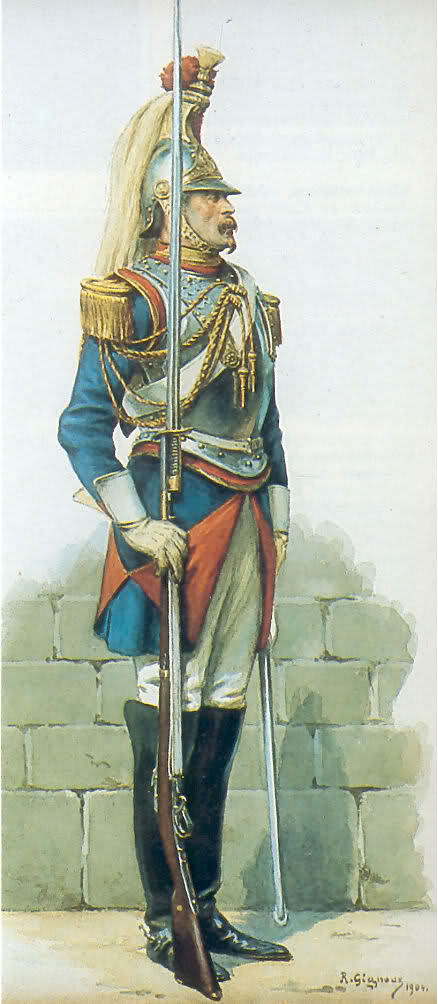
Cent-garde in full uniform

Prévost was enlisted as a conscript for a 6-year military service on 11 April 1855, replacing his older brother. Being of large stature and burly, he was incorporated into the 4th Cuirassiers regiment before moving on 14 October 1856 to the 2nd Cuirassier Regiment of the Imperial Guard and the 12th Cuirassier Regiment, with whom he participated in the Italian campaign, for which he received the commemorative medal. On 31 December 1861, he was released and given a certificate of good conduct.

His return to civilian life was short, as he signed a 7-year-old contract on 14 October 1862 and returned to the 2nd regiment. Because of his experience with the cuirassiers, his good service and his height of 6 feet (at the time, the average size of men was about 5 foot 5 inches), he entered the very strict recruitment criteria (Note: At the time of his recruitment, in addition to irreproachable conduct and morality, it was necessary to be at least 1.80 metres (5 ft 11 in) tall, to have at least two years of seniority in the cuirassiers and a commitment to remain for at least three years.) of the prestigious cent-gardes Squadron that he joined on 20 January 1866, and was assigned the number 418.

Consisting of large, experienced cavalry, the squadron of cent-gardes escorted the emperor Napoleon III on horseback. Their large size and their brilliant uniforms gave them very high prestige, and one of their peculiarities was to remain in all circumstances impeccably fixed, like statues, which earned them the nickname "caryatids of power". (Note: Louis Alphonse Hyrvoix theorized that same cent-garde was indeed Prévost (Gustave Macé 1923).)

Many women came to admire each other on prom nights the glittering cuirasses; more than one noticed in the salons the frisky officers of the time, and God knows what we could tell about it if the heroes of many adventures were not yet alive, or their memory too respected by us, so that we were allowed to track their happy hours.

The reputation of the cent-gardes in this area was of a humorous manner: a humorous engraving at the time, published by the Le Bon Marché, was that of a cent-gardes officer, back at his quarters at the end to the Court, busy emptying his boots filled with love letters by admirers while he was standing still.

It seemed that Prévost was particularly noticed for his physique: "He represented the physical beauty and we could've molded the other hundred guards like him.". (Note: Louis Alphonse Hyrvoix, former police director at the imperial residences (Gustave Macé 1923)) (Note: Allusion to the Parisian Shepherd in a passage from the opéra bouffe La belle Hélène)

At the end of his service, Prévost was released on 14 April 1869 with, for a second time, a certificate of good conduct.

=== Career and behavior in the police force ===
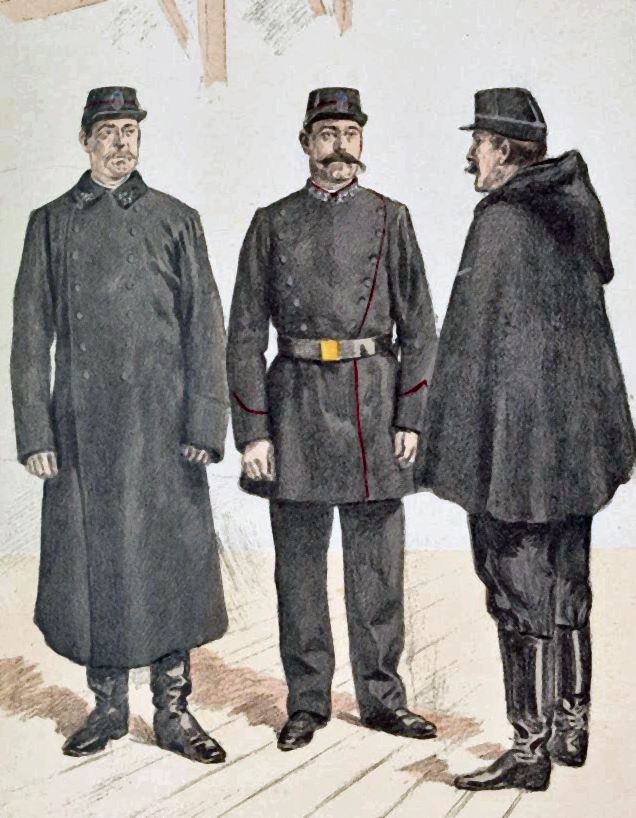
Paris Peacekeepers Uniforms between 1873 and 1894

From 1 July 1869, he was hired by the municipal police in Paris on the recommendation of one of its leaders, Sergeant de Ville, and tenured a year later on 30 June 31870. But the body was soon dissolved on 10 September, the day after the fall of the Second Empire. It was almost immediately recreated under another name, and Prévost engaged, on 8 November 1870, as a peacekeeper. He was attached to the post at Rue de l'Évangile, located in Quartier de La Chapelle of the 18th arrondissement of Paris.

If his behaviour was irreproachable during his stays in the army, it was not the same when Prévost joined the municipal police. On 18 September 1871, he was reprimanded for negligence in his service. On 11 September 1876, he was blamed for abandoning the block he was supposed to watch, and on the 15th he was subjected to a deduction of salary for spending his time at a wine merchant. However, on 16 April 1876, he was commended for having mastered, at the peril of his life, a runaway horse which earned him a bonus.

Prévost was not easy to converse with:

His conversation was that of a rough mind. It was almost zero. When he came out of his silence, it was to say banalities or foolishness, but he warmed up and became loquacious every time the conversation turned towards murder. His colleagues were accustomed to his strange reflections they took as jokes of bad taste: "If he comes to fight with me in the fortifications, I would cut him, I would bone him." or "Bah! Cut out a man or animal, what does it do from the moment he is dead!".

He was nonetheless very helpful, and loved children. Besides his working hours, he happened to escort home stray kids, offering them treats he purchased on the way. His appearance varied greatly according to his uniform:

In the cuirassier uniform, he was superb. As a sergeant of this city, as a guardian of peace, he lost two-thirds of his prestige, but women still called him "handsome", especially because of his imposing size. Under civilian clothes, confounded with ordinary passers-by, he had superiority over others only in his high stature.

His success with the fair sex complicated the life of his boss:

I was very embarrassed by Prévost. I was obliged at every moment to change the islet because the shopkeepers ignited as it passed, which put discord in households. I had thought it best to assign him as an orderly to La Chapelle. His presence was enough to turn the maids' heads upside down, and I received collective complaints from parents who complained that their maids were abandoning the children entrusted in their care to follow him.

Because of this, Prévost was exiled as a monitor in Gare du Nord, where there were only men.

== Crimes and punishment ==
=== Murder of Alexandre Lenoble ===
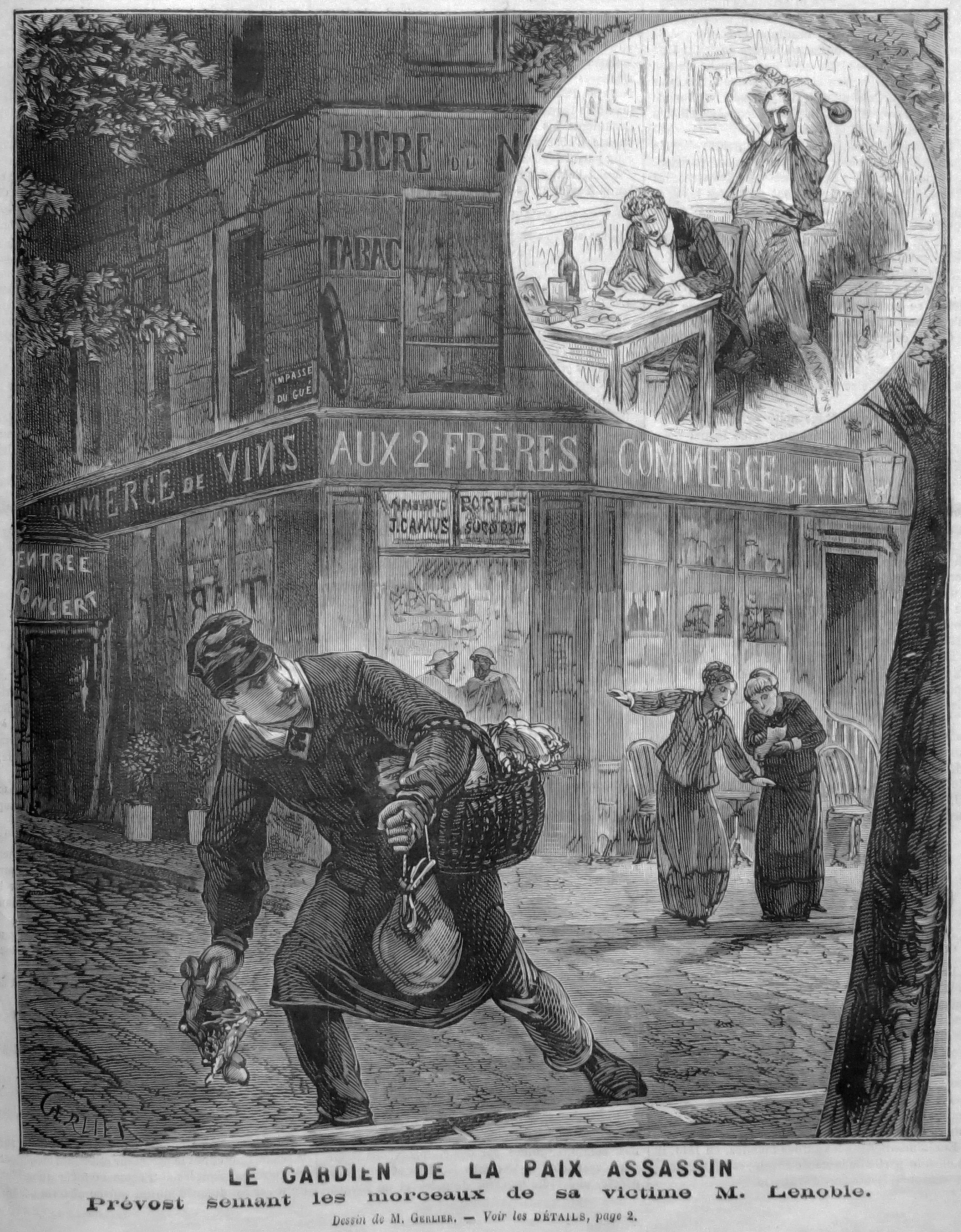
Prévost dispersing of Lenoble's body parts

On 10 September 1879, at about 8 o'clock in the evening, Madame Thiéry, a resident of the district which was deserted at this hour, saw at the corner of the Rue de La Chapelle and Rue du Pré maudit the tall figure of a man, dressed in a cattle driver's gown and a silk cap, leaning over the stream that passed there. Intrigued, she watched him from a distance and ended up seeing him walk away towards Ney Boulevard. Madame Thiéry cautiously approached the place he abandoned and discovered, half stuck in a manhole, a packet containing freshly cut meat. At that moment, a peacekeeper named Hardy came by and she asked him for help. They immediately decided to take the package to the police station, but took the advice of a butcher and a pharmacist, who recognized fragments from a skinned human arm. Research was immediately undertaken and 77 additional pieces were discovered, three of which were recovered from a rag-picker who was about to sell them for consumption. Other parts, including a hand and "the parts of a person who belongs to the male sex" were found in a ditch near the fortifications near the Poterne des Poisonniers. At the Paris morgue, where the pieces were transferred, efforts were made to reconstitute the body of the victim by reassembly, as to when they were discovered, that still remained a secret. In the end, only the head was missing, as well as a piece that could never be found because a poor man had probably "picked up it carefully, packaged it, like a piece of veal falling from the net of a housewife, cooked it in his hut and enjoyed it with the family."

The next morning, Madame Thiéry went to the police station to make a statement. When asked to describe the suspect, she said that she did not know him, but using the light from a street lamp, she found that he bore a resemblance to the well-known peacekeeper in the neighbourhood, known under the soubriquet of "The Handsome Man". Madame Thiéry was also convinced that he had been her neighbour on Rue des Roses in 1877. Prévost seemed like an unlikely suspect for Commissioner Lefébure, but he still summoned him in the presence of his accuser. Prévost denied involvement, stating the following:

Died in Pré-maudit? I do not know where that even is!

The commissioner immediately responded:

You just made your first lie, you know the place as you arrested criminals there last year. What was your schedule last night?

Embarrassed, Prévost replied that he was at home due to indisposition. This was another lie, as the day before, at around 21 o'clock, wearing a blouse and carrying a bucket covered with a cloth, he met a colleague to whom he said he was tired because he had just helped a friend move. Overwhelmed, Prévost went silent. When Lefébure asked him where is the head, Prévost replied "at home, in a cauldron". The victim was a certain Lenoble, a jeweller. Accused, Prévost confessed:

I have known Mr. Lenoble for some time, to whom I expressed the intention to buy a gold chain payable in instalments. We made an appointment, and yesterday at noon, he was in my room at Number 75 Rue Riquet. On my bed, he spread out his wares, arguing for the price of 240 francs, telling me that it was his best chain and his most beautiful medallion. I took the advantage of the moment he was writing down the bills payable in monthly terms and knocked him out with a ball of tender. (Note: Piece of iron used by railway engineers.) A first vigorous blow, with both of my hands, struck him down; the second hit broke the skull; the third was useless. He made no movement, did not utter a cry, gurgling at intervals. I then undressed my victim, put him in a trunk and stripped the body of flesh entirely to prevent recognition. At three o'clock, I began to cut up the corpse, and at five o'clock, my work was finished. I flushed the liquid parts in the lavatories, and I disposed of the solid ones in the sewers, vacant lots and the ditches around the fortifications. My job being done, I had dinner, and at around 10 o'clock I went to bed. This morning, I resumed my work with Lenoble's head, his jewellery box and his clothes at home.

His guilt being proven, Prévost was first sent to the lock-up before being incarcerated in Mazas Prison to await trial.

Alexandre Lenoble was a 38-year-old jewellery broker who had just recently established his own business. He left behind a widow and two children, aged 11 and 6. The butcher knife used by Prévost to dismember the victim is kept at the Musée de la préfecture de police in Paris.

=== Murder of Adèle Blondin ===
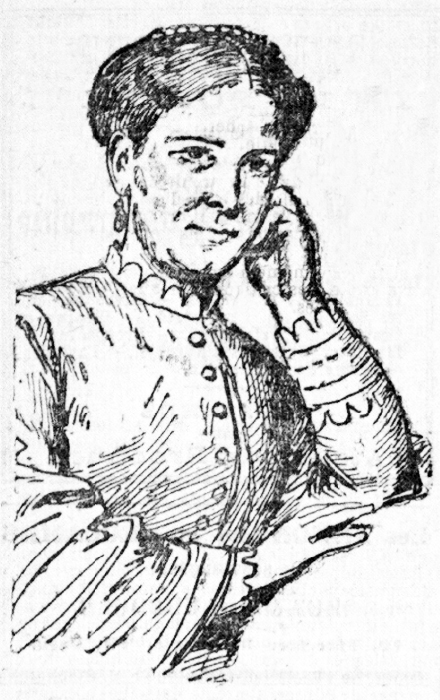
Adèle Blondin

Prévost also had a mistress named Adèle Blondin. (Note: Sometimes mistakenly called "Marguerite Blondin" in the newspapers) She had been for some time the governess of a rich old man who, to thank her, had left her a sum of 30,000 francs. Blondin sometimes helped her impoverished sister but, being economical, she lived on a monthly income of 1,500 francs from its capital placed in state annuity. Blondin bought a business and began earning a few thousand francs worth of money. Being suspicious, she usually hid her values, money and main jewellery. On Sunday, 27 February 1876, she went to lunch at Prévost's house, who at the time lived at 22 Rue de l'Évangile, in front of the police station where he worked. Her landlady saw her leaving, adorned with her jewels and wrapped with a Scottish shawl.

The connection became evident when items belonging to the missing person, including her Scottish shawl, were discovered at Prévost's residence. Initially, he had asserted that he only took her umbrella while leaving the shawl behind. Faced with compelling evidence, he changed his story, claiming the items were gifts from Blondin and retracting his earlier statement about the shawl. When taken to Blondin's last known location at Rue de l'Évangile, the discovery of blood droplets prompted Prévost to admit to his crime:

It was I who killed the Blondin girl. I strangled her first with both hands. She was lying, drunk, on this bed. It was Sunday, 27 February 1876, at 2 o'clock in the afternoon. I wanted to get rid of her, it was a crampon. I had other views and she bothered me. I then cut her out as Lenoble; but she impressed me a lot less than him while doing the job. I threw the pieces in the sewers. As for the head, you will it in the fortifications, where it is buried near the grand office. I gave away or sold her jewels. [...] She only had 1,500 francs on her, no more, I tell you.

In the afternoon, Prévost guided the investigators to the place where he buried the head. Quickly, a labourer dug up the fragmented skull of the unfortunate victim.

=== Suspect in two other disappearances ===
In early October, following the discovery of Prévost's second murder, a rumour spread of a third possible crime. Prévost is suspected of having previously murdered another peacekeeper, who disappeared without a trace four years before, an act which he categorically denied. To put an end to an inquiry with uncertain results that promised to be long, while the authorities wanted to finish quickly, he was made to write a written statement in which he expressed his repentance for his two confirmed crimes. Prévost swore that if he was guilty of anything, he would confess without hesitation.

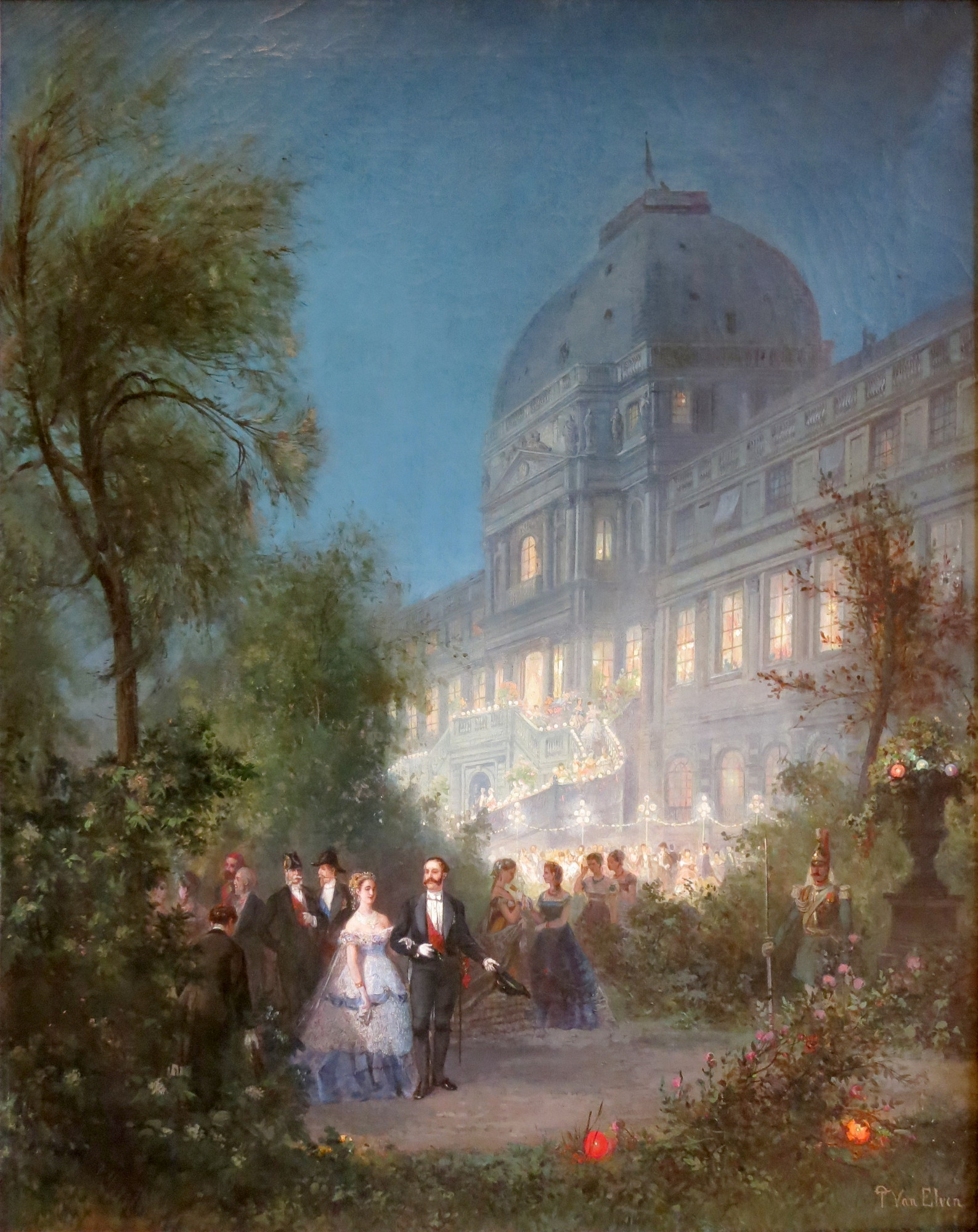
Ball at the Tuileries in 1867

In his work concerning Prévost, Gustave Massé talked about his discussions with Louis-Alphonse Hyrvoix, former chief of Napoleon III's cent-gardes who, as such, watched the guests at the balls, parties and receptions that took place at the Tuileries Palace. Despite the precautions, undesirables and women of "high gallantry" managed to slip in. At the Ball of Tuileries in 1867, Hyrvoix noticed a fair-skinned woman, dressed in a simple but tasteful manner, on the arm of an embassy attaché to whom she asked many questions, while taking notes in a small notebook. Located by police officers who escorted her out of the ball, she was subjected to an interrogation, to which she bowed with good grace: it turned out that the young woman was a 35-year-old rich widow from a good family, who travelled all over Europe, sometimes in male costumes, who sorted all of her travels in a chronicle she addressed to a Parisian newspaper under the pseudonym "Furet". She had persuaded her lover to give her the means to enter the palace, which she had wanted to visit. As a result, the young embassy attaché had to resign from his post. Supervised by the imperial police, it was established that the woman was free of many manners: she had had multiple adventures with handsome men, who to her were only tools for pleasure. Thus, it was discovered that she regularly invited Prévost over to a private office, located in a restaurant on the Avenue de Neuilly. A short time later, the lady disappeared without a trace and was never seen or heard from again. The evening of her disappearance, she had had supper with Victor Prévost.

At that time, nobody cared: the lady was an adventuress, as frivolous as she was unpredictable, who travelled a lot. As no complaint for her disappearance was filed for a while, the handsome cent-gardes, petticoat rider but with an irreproachable behaviour, had no reason to be suspected. It was only at the time of his arrest and the revelation of his two killings that the few people still aware of the strange disappearance, then 12 years old, made the connection with a possible additional murder. But investigators, who were not aware of the suspicion against Prévost prior to his trial and that the possible crime, being impossible to prove, was prescribed to him anyway.

A few minutes before his execution, when Prévost was asked for the last time if he had anything else to say, he replied: "I confessed to the two crimes I committed. That's enough, unfortunately. I did not make other mistakes in my life...".

=== Gold or silver? ===
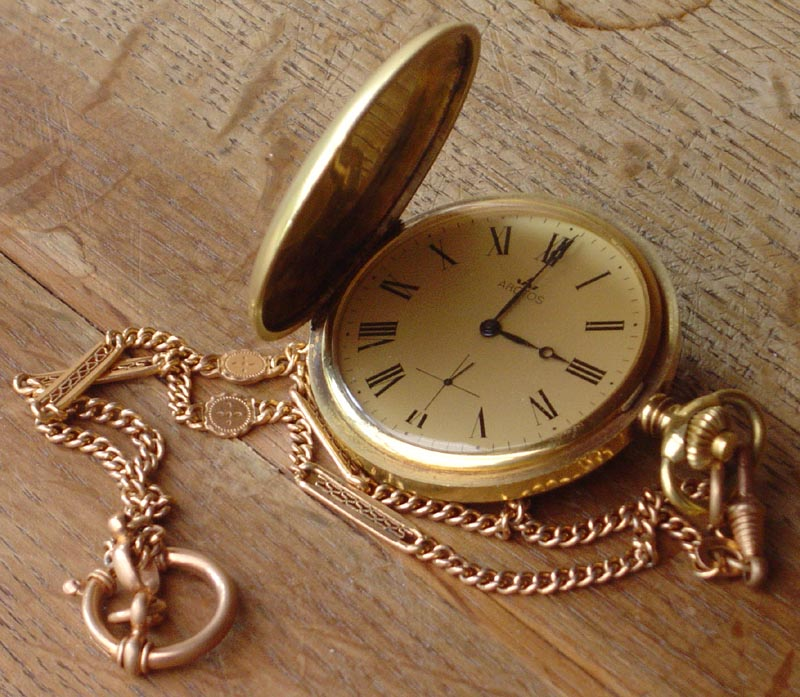
A gold pocket watch

Prévost did not disdain the money taken from his victims, but at the same time, he did not seek wealth or even an easier lifestyle. The opinion of his colleagues and friend Doré was unambiguous: "Prévost had only one word to say: to swim in opulence. He was a lady's man. He frequented around very rich people who would have been happy to sacrifice their fortune to him, but if he accepted attendance at diners and parties, he rejected money and gifts. He would see himself as dishonored by accepting them. You should have seen the indignant air with which he exclaimed 'Do they take me for a barbel?'" (Note: In slang terms: a pimp, a mackerel) At the moment when he murdered Alexandre Lenoble for some gold jewellery, and him being a demimonde, who was very much in the mood for a castle in the provinces. He had nagged Prévost about his modest home, while Lenoble had a splendid carriage and was covered in diamonds, whose value far exceeded that of Prévost.

On the other hand, Prévost was fascinated by gold, with a particular interest in precious watches that his means did not allow him to possess.

The diamonds meant nothing to him, but the reflection of the gold attracted him like a magnet. He stopped for a long time at the displays of goldsmiths. This passion began to quickly affect his character, with Victor amusing himself by asking a passer-by for the time, just so he could see their shining gold watches, even if it was for a second.

=== Trial ===
Victor Prévost's trial was held before the cour d'assises in Seine, chaired by Mr. Hardouin and two assessors, on 7 December 1879. At quarter past eleven, the accused entered, accompanied by eight guards. The defence was provided by Mr. Bouchot, while the Attorney General was Mr. Lefebvre de Biefville. While reading through the indictment, which included details and the way in which the two murders were committed, Prévost stood upright and remained calm, but his discouragement could be felt. He then answered questions from the judge, who made him confirm the facts and clarify details. It was then when the witnesses were called, confirming the depositions made during the instruction. Then following the indictment, during which Prévost seemed to accuse the police of a cover-up, and pleaded to his lawyer.

After a summary of the debates by the judge, the jury met to deliberate and answer all the questions posed in just twenty minutes. The court then withdrew to establish their verdict before pronouncing, unsurprisingly, the death sentence against Victor Prévost for crimes of premeditated murder. During the statement, he showed no emotion.

=== Execution ===
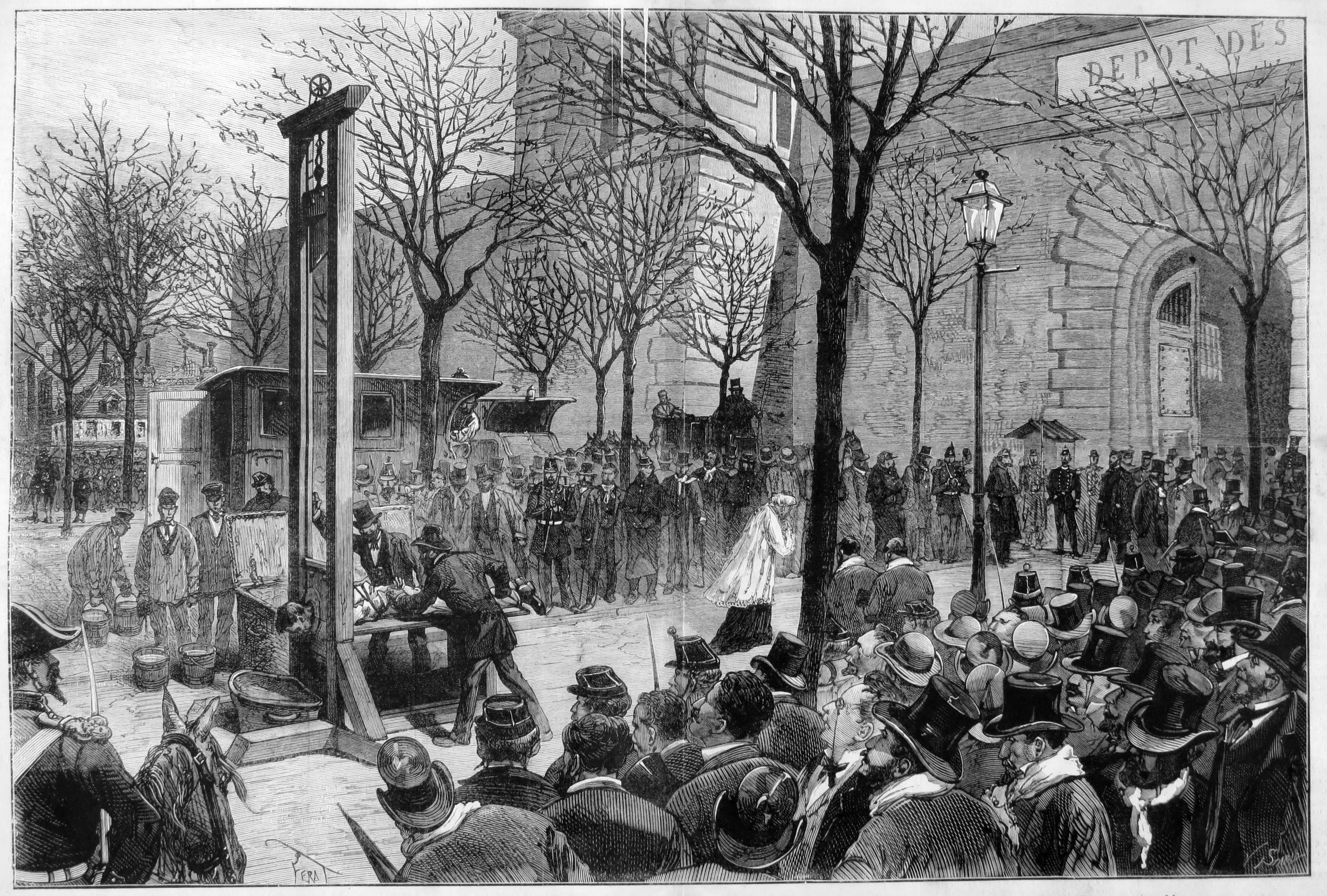
Execution of Victor Prévost in front of La Roquette Prison. Contrary to what the engraving suggests, at the time of the execution it was still almost night: "But it is still so dark, that we see only one group in which nothing is distinguished."

The day after his trial, on 9 December in the afternoon, Prévost was transferred to the La Roquette Grand Prison, a unique detention centre in which death row inmates were executed since 1851. On 13 December, he was visited by Father Crozes, the prison almoner and, from that moment, he showed an interest in practising religion. The next day he asked to attend mass and, on the following 11 January, he expressed to the abbot his wish to make his First Communion which he had not received in his childhood, a sacrament which he received on 16 January at 7 o'clock in the morning, in the prison chapel. On the evening of the ceremony, he wrote a last letter to his brother Adolphe, in which he acknowledged his errors, expressed his desire for repentance and demanded "a thousand pardons".

On 26 December 1879, an appeal was dismissed by the Criminal Division of the cour d'assises. The next day, his lawyer made him sign a petition for a pardon. The then-president, Jules Grévy, generally was not very reluctant to grant pardons to those sentenced to death, but followed the recommendations of the commissions of pardons, which concluded that justice must follow its course because of the particularly sordid crimes and Prévost's profession. Grévy justified his decision to the condemned's lawyer in the following letter:

My predecessor, Marshal MacMahon, did not hesitate. Sébastien Billoir, former soldier, decorated with a military medal, was a pensioner of the State forfeited with honor. He died and signed his conviction. (Note: Sébastien Billoir, who had chopped the body of his victim Marie Le Menach in half, was executed on April 28, 1877.) The former cent-gardes, who has become a peacekeeper, has by his double crime surpassed this man. It seems difficult to me now that he will suffer the same fate.

The pardon was formally rejected on 18 January, and Louis Deibler, recently appointed chief executioner on 15 May, was summoned to the prosecutor's office of the Republic and issued the ultimate requisition: Order is given to the chief executioner of criminal judgments to seize Victor Prévost, sentenced to death by the cour d'assises of Seine, on 8 December 1879, and proceed with his execution in public on Monday, 19 January 1880, at seven o'clock in the morning.

On the scheduled date and time, Prévost was executed publicly in front of the prison, in the freezing cold (-5 °C). It had previously snowed, and two huge snow mounds surrounded the square, plunging into near darkness. Since six o'clock in the morning, a hundred republican guards, fifty horsemen, and three hundred peacekeepers had taken their places to keep at a distance those who had come to watch the execution. Warned that his execution would take place at 6:30, Prévost was asked to put on a white shirt, which he refused, and to keep his slippers on because the boots would hurt his feet. He obeyed all the preparatory procedures for implementation and walked worthily to the scaffold. Between his identification and his execution, it took a little more than four months.

As for the executioner Louis Deibler, that was his first execution in Paris, as he had previously practised his job in the provinces. For this first time, he was to be assisted by his first deputy designate, Alphonse-Léon Berger (later chief executioner of Corsica, 1870–1875), who was dismissed from Prévost's execution, which caused a lasting quarrel between the two men.

=== Autopsy and scientific studies ===
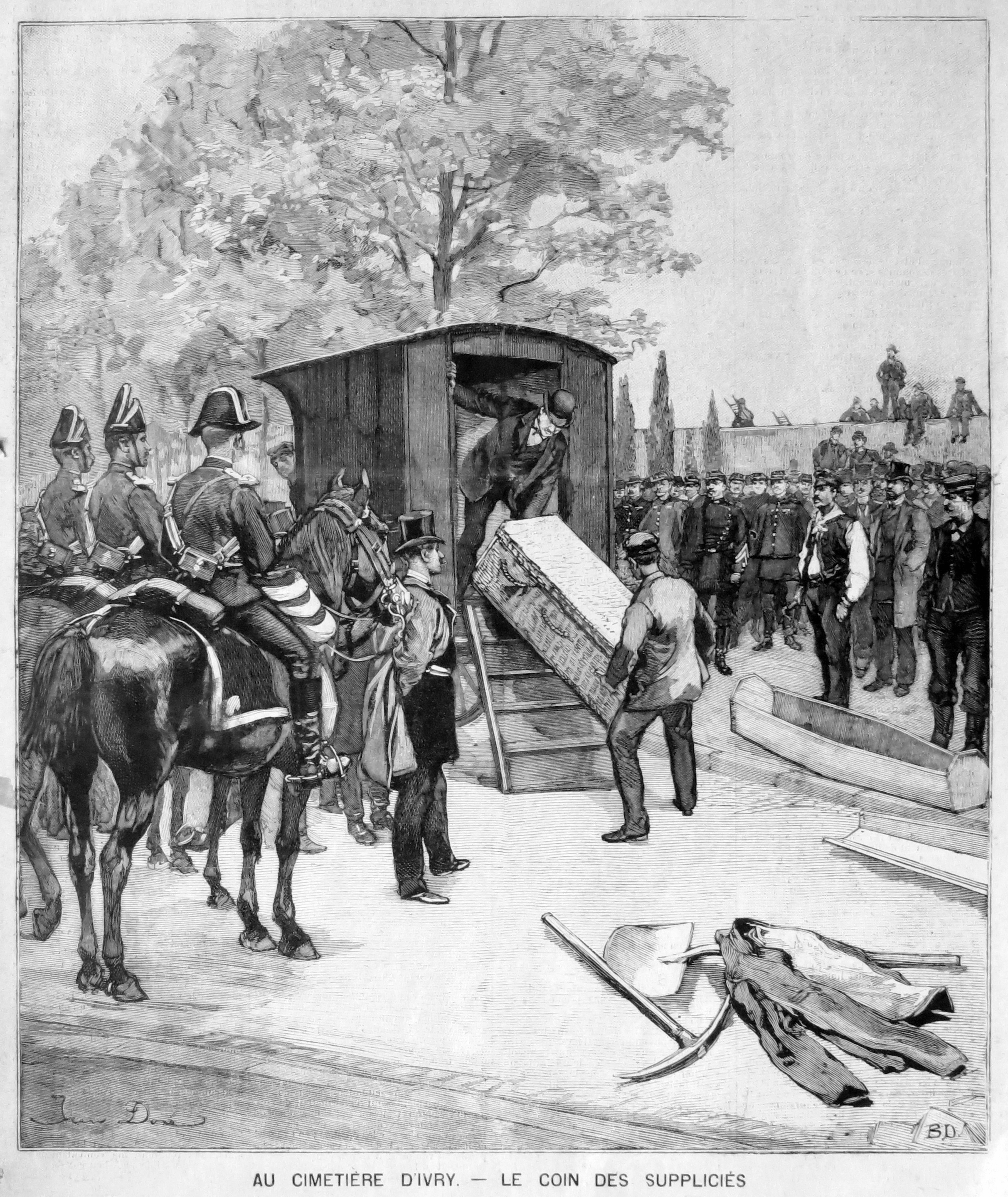
Burial at Ivry Cemetery

Prévost's family did not claim his body, so he was put at the disposal of the dean of the Faculty of Forensic Medicine, for the purpose of an autopsy and phrenological studies.

However, legal procedures required a mock burial in the cemetery. Immediately after the execution, the coffin containing Prévost's body and head was loaded with a bran container into a van that went off on the field with a great trot, escorted by mounted gendarmes, to go to the hospice cemeteries which adjoined Ivry Cemetery. It was followed by three cars, carrying the chaplain, accompanied by the head of the security services and the journalists. At precisely 7:45, the van stopped near an open pit surrounded by gravediggers. Prévost's body was exhumed from the coffin, and placed in a light wooden coffin, with his head slipped between his legs. Father Crozes recited a final prayer before the coffin was temporarily closed with two nails. Ultimately, the pit became bloodied, which came from the bottom of the coffin. At the end of the brief ceremony, the coffin was loaded into a medical van, which immediately left towards the medical faculty.

At half-past eight, only an hour and a half after his execution, Prévost's still-warm body was disposed of in Professor Charles-Philippe Robin's laboratory at the Practical School in the Faculty of Medicine in Paris. Immediately, the teacher, the doctors and the students engaged in various experiments. At 10 o'clock, with the arrival of a dozen other doctors, there were excitations of the muscles with the help of an electric battery. The sensitivity of the body decreasing, and the reactions to shocks were tested. These macabre experiments completed, the fifteen or so experimentalists of all ages began to dissect and dismember the remains of the deceased. "All these observers seem happy at the opportunity to study at leisure, under the microscope, studies on the body of a man who, a few hours earlier, was in good health. [...] At noon, there remained of the old body only packets of crumbling flesh, emptied of blood, shapeless and scattered.".

Shortly after, Professor Paul Broca published a study entitled "The Brain of the Killer Prévost". From his analysis, with assorted scholarly considerations, Prévost as put in the category of "smart murderers", but functional defects in the brain made it "very abnormal". (Note: These conclusions are relative, because of the very empirical knowledge at the time on the functioning of the human brain. Despite the use of various means of sophisticated studies such as [[genetic testing]], the predisposition to crime remained a very controversial hypothesis: Justine Canonne, https://le-cercle-psy.scienceshumaines.com/le-retour-du-criminel-ne_sh_31303, Archived August 21, 2013) Another scholar, Louis Bélières, resumed this study in 1909 by comparing Prévost's brain to those of other criminals.

== Bulimia ==
From a very young age, Victor Prévost suffered from insatiable bulimia, inherited from his father, which manifested itself throughout his life: "I have a good appetite, I eat well; but do not gain weight.", he wrote in prison. The autopsy notes anomalies present in his digestive prison that could perhaps have a link with his perpetual munching, but no study was conducted beyond simple observations. During a banquet organized by the Friendly Association of the Ancient Cent-Gardes, Brigadier Valentin recounted having surprised Prévost, while he was stealing from the squadron's raw meat supplies. Several of his ex-comrades confirmed that he had declared: "to the human appetite".

== In popular culture ==
A certain expression came from his lips: "Cut the cabèche, that's velvet, with chocolate." At the time, the expression circulated in police stations without gaining much mainstream attention, but it was entered into popular language and even taken up by Oscar Méténier in Act II of his macabre drama Lui!, played for the first time on 11 September 1897 at the Grand Guignol Theatre: "Ah!...Cut someone's head! That's velvet!...That's chocolate!".

== See also ==
- List of French serial killers

== See also ==
=== Mediagraphy ===
==== Bibliography ====
===== Works =====
- Dossier personnel de Victor Prévost (No. 26 712) conservé aux archives de la préfecture de police au Pré Saint-Gervais.
- Georges Grison (1883). Souvenirs de la place de La Roquette (in French). Paris: E Dentu. pp. 257–280.
- Abbé Moreau (1884). Souvenirs de la petite et de la grande Roquette (in French). Paris: Rouff. pp. 354–361. Recueillis de différents côtés et mis en ordre par l’abbé Moreau successeur de l’abbé Crozes ancien aumônier de la Roquette.
- Gustave Macé (1893). Crimes passionnels (in French). Paris: Charpentier. p. 292. L'auteur a été chef de la sûreté de la préfecture de police du 15 février 1879 au 23 février 1884.
- Albert Verly (1894). Souvenirs du Second Empire (in French). Paris: Paul Ollendorff.
- Louis Bélières (1909). La peine de mort (in French). Paris: Imprimeries réunies. p. 36.
- Ernest Raynaud (1923). Souvenirs de police (in French). Paris: Payot. pp. 66–92. Ancien commissaire de police.
- Eric Blanchegorge; Nathalie Baudouin; Michel Baudoin (2004). Cent-gardes pour un empereur. Histoire et Documents (in French). Compiègne: Association des Amis des musées Antoine Vivenel et de la Figurine historique. ISBN 2951157983. Archived from the original on 3 March 2016.
- Jean Prasteau (1993). Le boucher de la Chapelle (in French). Paris: Fleuve Noir.
- Madame Carette (1889). Souvenirs intimes de la Cour des Tuileries (in French). Paris: Paul Ollendorff.
- Bruno Fuligni (2015). Musée secret de la police (in French). Gründ. ISBN 978-2324009280.
- Agnès Pierron (2016). Le Grand guignol: Le théâtre des peurs de la Belle Époque (in French). Groupe Robert Laffont. ISBN 978-2-221-19132-3.

===== Newspaper and periodicals =====
- "Un nouveau Billoir". Le Petit Parisien: Journal Quotidien du Soir (in French): 3. 13 September 1879. LPP13.
- "Un nouveau Billoir". Le Petit Parisien: Journal Quotidien du Soir (in French): 3. 14 September 1879. LPP14.
- "Un nouveau Billoir". Le Petit Parisien: Journal Quotidien du Soir (in French): 3. 15 September 1879. LPP15.
- "Un nouveau Billoir". Le Petit Parisien: Journal Quotidien du Soir (in French): 3. 16 September 1879. LPP16.
- "Un nouveau Billoir". Le Petit Parisien: Journal Quotidien du Soir (in French): 3. 17 September 1879. LPP17.
- "Affaire Prévost". Le Petit Parisien: Journal Quotidien du Soir (in French): 3. 9 October 1879. LPP910.
- "L'affaire Prévost". La Lanterne (in French) (963). 1879. Déroulement du procès et commentaires d'un journaliste présent à l'audience.
- "Le gardien de la paix assassin". La presse illustrée (in French) (599). 1879. PI1.
- "Le crime et le châtiment. Exécution de Prévost". La presse illustrée (in French) (617). 1880. PI2. Gravure de l'exécution de Prévost sur la double page intérieure.
- Albert Verly (3 March 1894a). "L'escadron des cent-gardes". Le Figaro. Supplément littéraire (in French). 20 (9): 1.
- Paul Broca (1880). "Le cerveau de l'assassin Prévost". Revue d'anthropologie. 3 (in French). II: 238–243.

==== Radio broadcasts ====
- Christophe Hondelatte (présentateur) (16 June 2018). Victor Prévost, le bel homme (mp3). Hondelatte raconte. Paris: Europe 1.

=== Related articles ===
- Cent-gardes Squadron

=== External links ===
- Jean-Marc Berlière (1 January 2009). "La cervelle du gardien de la paix". Criminocorpus, Revue Hypermédia (in French). doi:10.4000/criminocorpus.260.
- Jacques Pradel (27 December 2016). "Victor Prevost, le gardien de la paix assassin". rtl.fr (in French).
