= Lisandro Pérez =

Venezuelan footballer (born 2000)

Personal information
- Full name: Lisandro José Pérez Verenzuela
- Date of birth: 7 June 2000 (age 26)
- Place of birth: San Fernando de Apure, Venezuela
- Height: 1.77 m (5 ft 10 in)
- Position: Forward

Team information
- Current team: Academia Puerto Cabello
- Number: 19

Youth career
- Academia Puerto Cabello

Senior career*
| Years | Team | Apps | (Gls) |
| 2018– | Academia Puerto Cabello | 82 | (12) |
| 2019–2020 | → Boston River (loan) | 1 | (0) |
| 2023– | → Mineros de Guayana (loan) | 17 | (4) |

International career
| 2018 | Venezuela U20 | | |
- * Club domestic league appearances and goals as of 5:12, 16 September 2023 (UTC)

Lisandro José Pérez Verenzuela (born 7 June 2000) is a Venezuelan professional footballer who plays as a forward for Venezuelan club Academia Puerto Cabello.

== Professional career ==
Pérez made his professional debut with Academia Puerto Cabello on the first matchday of the 2018 season, which also happened to be the club's debut in the Venezuelan Primera División. He played the full 90 minutes of a 0–0 league draw against Metropolitanos. He scored his first goal just over three months later, netting the game-winner during a 1–0 victory over Estudiantes de Caracas on 6 April. He received great praise for his performance from the Venezuelan media. By the end of the season, he had begun to attract international attention.

In June 2019, Pérez was loaned out to Uruguayan Primera División club Boston River on a one-year deal.

== International career ==
Pérez was called up to the Venezuela national under-20 team in August 2018 for friendlies in the United States and in Qatar. He made his youth international debut on 10 September against Qatar. He then traveled with the team to Spain for a handful of friendlies in preparation for the 2019 South American U-20 Championship.

== Career statistics ==
=== Club ===
As of 23 August 2019.

| Club | Season | League | | | Cup | | Continental | | Other | | Total | |
| Club | Season | Division | Apps | Goals | Apps | Goals | Apps | Goals | Apps | Goals | Apps | Goals |
|---|---|---|---|---|---|---|---|---|---|---|---|---|
| Academia Puerto Cabello | 2018 | Venezuelan First Division | 10 | 1 | 0 | 0 | – | | 0 | 0 | 10 | 1 |
| Academia Puerto Cabello | 2019 | Venezuelan First Division | 16 | 3 | 0 | 0 | – | | 0 | 0 | 16 | 3 |
| Career total | | | 26 | 4 | 0 | 0 | 0 | 0 | 0 | 0 | 26 | 4 |
