= Valines =

- Commune
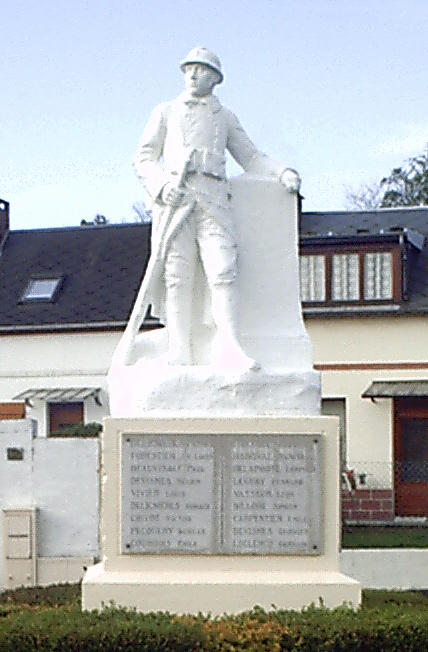
- The war memorial in Valines

- Coat of arms
- Location of Valines
- Location within France Location within Hauts-de-France
- Coordinates: 50°04′36″N 1°37′24″E
- Country: France
- Region: Hauts-de-France
- Department: Somme
- Arrondissement: Abbeville
- Canton: Friville-Escarbotin
- Intercommunality: CC Vimeu

Government
  - Mayor (2020–2026): Jacquy Manier
- Area^{1}: 5.25 km^{2} (2.03 sq mi)
- Elevation: 83 m (272 ft)
- Highest elevation: 98 m (322 ft)
- Lowest elevation: 65 m (213 ft)
- Population (2023): 655
  - Density: 125/km^{2} (323/sq mi)
- Time zone: UTC+01:00 (CET)
  - Summer (DST): UTC+02:00 (CEST)
- INSEE/Postal code: 80775 /80210
- ^{1} French Land Register data, which excludes lakes, ponds, glaciers > 1 km^{2} (0.386 sq mi or 247 acres) and river estuaries.

Valines (French pronunciation: [valin]) is a commune in the Somme department in Hauts-de-France in northern France.

== Geography ==
Valines is situated 9 miles (14 km) west of Abbeville, on the D925 road.

== Population ==
Historical population
Year	Pop.	±% p.a.
1968	605	—
1975	600	−0.12%
1982	614	+0.33%
1990	673	+1.15%
1999	663	−0.17%
2007	639	−0.46%
2012	646	+0.22%
2017	636	−0.31%
2023	655	+0.49%
Source: INSEE

== See also ==
- Communes of the Somme department
