= Lisandro Henríquez =

Chilean footballer (born 1982)

Personal information
- Full name: Lisandro Alexis Henríquez Gómez
- Date of birth: 3 September 1982 (age 44)
- Place of birth: Concepción, Chile
- Height: 1.81 m (5 ft 11 in)
- Position: Right back

Team information
- Current team: Naval

Youth career
- Fernández Vial

Senior career*
Years	Team	Apps	(Gls)
2003–2005	Fernández Vial	?	(?)
2006–2011	U. de Concepción	119	(1)
2010	→ Everton (loan)	20	(2)
2012–	Naval	11	(0)
- * Club domestic league appearances and goals as of 30 April 2012 ‡ National team caps and goals as of 15 November 2011

Lisandro Alexis Henríquez Gómez (born 3 September 1982) is a Chilean football that currently plays for Chilean Primera B side Everton as a right back.
