= Blanche Monnier =

French woman kept locked away for 25 years (1849–1913)

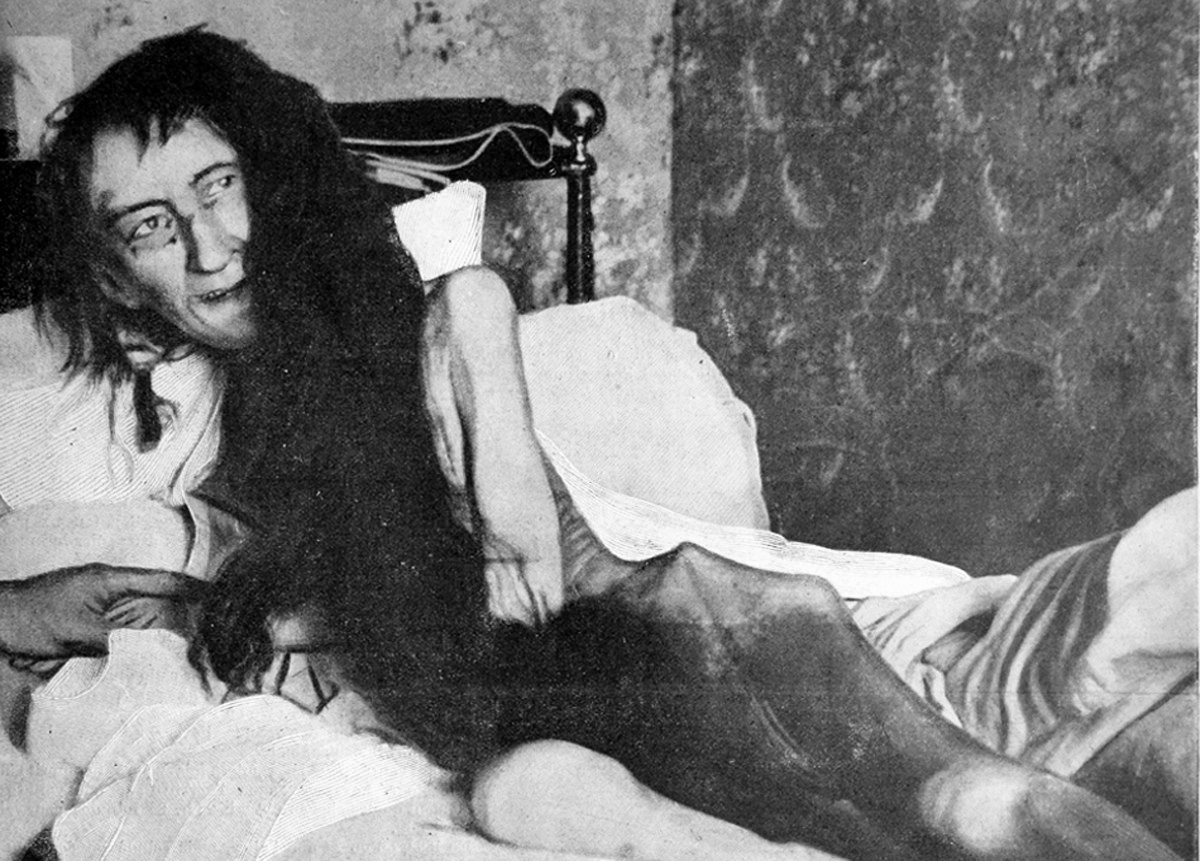
- Monnier shortly after being discovered in the room in which she was secretly incarcerated, 23 May 1901
- Born: 1 March 1849; Poitiers, Vienne, French Second Republic
- Disappeared: 1875/1876 – Thursday, 23 May 1901 (25 years)
- Died: 13 October 1913 (aged 64); Blois, Loir-et-Cher, French Third Republic
- Other name: la Séquestrée de Poitiers
- Known for: Secretly imprisoned by her family for a quarter-century

Blanche Monnier (French pronunciation: [blɑ̃ʃ mɔnje]; 1 March 1849 – 13 October 1913), often known in France as la Séquestrée de Poitiers (Note: Pronounced in French as a rhyme as [la sekɛstʁe d(ə) pwatje].) (roughly, "The Confined Woman of Poitiers"), was a woman from Poitiers, France, who was secretly kept locked in a small room by her aristocratic mother and brother for 25 years. She was eventually found by police, then middle-aged and in emaciated and filthy condition; according to officials, Monnier had not seen any sunlight for her entire captivity.

== Background ==
Monnier was a French socialite born on 1 March 1849, from a well-respected, conservative bourgeois family of Charles and Louise Monnier, in Poitiers of old noble origins. She had an elder brother, Marcel. She was renowned for her beauty and attracted many potential suitors for marriage. In 1876, at the age of 27, she desired to marry Victor Calmeil, an older lawyer who was not to her mother's liking; Louise argued that her daughter could not marry a "penniless lawyer". Her disapproving mother, angered by her daughter's defiance, locked her in a tiny, dark room in the attic of their home, where she kept her secluded for 25 years. Louise and Marcel continued on with their daily lives, pretending to mourn Blanche's disappearance. Her father, Charles-Émile, had been dismissed from his post as dean of the Faculty of Letters at the University of Poitiers at the time of the crisis of May 16, 1877. None of her friends knew where she was and the lawyer whom she wished to marry died unexpectedly in 1885.

== Discovery ==
On 23 May 1901, the "Paris Attorney General" (Note: See Procureur général for the closest translation of the office. The "Attorney General" of Paris was Léon Bulot from 1900.) received an anonymous letter, the author of which is still unknown, that revealed the false imprisonment:

Monsieur Attorney General: I have the honour to inform you of an exceptionally serious occurrence. I speak of a spinster who is locked up in Madame Monnier's house, half-starved and living on a putrid litter for the past twenty-five years – in a word, in her own filth.

On the afternoon of Thursday, May 23, 1901, at around five o’clock, Commissioner Bucheton of the Poitiers police arrived at the Monnier family residence. Accompanied by officers and armed with an order from Paris prosecutor Monsieur Morellet, he requested entry to inspect the home. The Monnier family employee, unable to refuse, consulted with the owner, Madame Louise Monnier, who, at 75 years old, was reportedly in bed. The officers were directed to her son, Marcel Monnier, a 53-year-old doctor of law and former public servant, who lived in a neighboring property.

Crossing the garden and rose bushes, the officers arrived at Marcel's door. Despite the butler's attempts to dissuade them, the police proceeded with their inquiry into an anonymous complaint alleging that an adult woman was being held captive in the Monnier household. Once inside, they searched each room on the ground floor, finding nothing unusual. They continued to the second floor, examining each space without any signs of concern—until they reached a locked attic door, secured with a thick chain and padlock. When asked to open it, the family initially resisted, but the officers insisted, warning they would involve a judge if necessary. Eventually, the door was unlocked.

As the police entered, they were met with a strong, overpowering odor. The space was in complete darkness, and at the far end of the attic, they saw what appeared to be a frail, emaciated figure lying on a deteriorated mattress. The room was in severe disrepair, littered with old food, insects, and waste. In order to improve visibility and ventilation, the officers broke the chains on the blinds and removed the canvas covering the windows. As sunlight flooded the space, rodents and insects scattered.

The figure in the attic, disoriented by the sudden brightness, recoiled and attempted to shield herself. She had long, unkempt hair reaching her ankles, and her nails were thick and overgrown. Marcel Monnier identified her as his sister, Blanche Monnier. Once a young and well-regarded member of society, Blanche was now 52 years old and had endured 25 years in captivity before finally being discovered.

Monnier was rescued by police from appalling conditions, covered in old food and feces, with bugs all around the bed and floor, weighing barely 25 kilograms (55 lb).

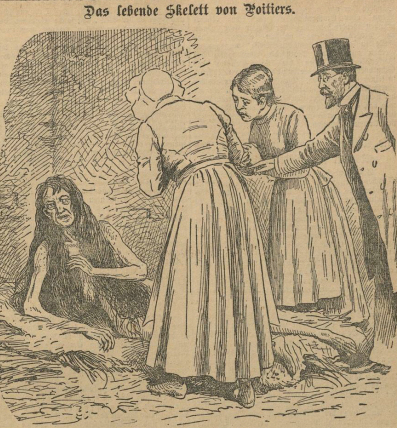
1901 drawing of Monnier's discovery. German caption: Das lebende Skelett von Poitiers ("The Living Skeleton of Poitiers").

One policeman described the state of Monnier and her bed thus:

The unfortunate woman was lying completely naked on a rotten straw mattress. All around her was formed a sort of crust made from excrement, fragments of meat, vegetables, fish and rotten bread... We also saw oyster shells, and bugs running across Mademoiselle Monnier's bed. The air was so unbreathable, the odour given off by the room was so rank, that it was impossible for us to stay any longer to proceed with our investigation.

== Arrests and aftermath ==
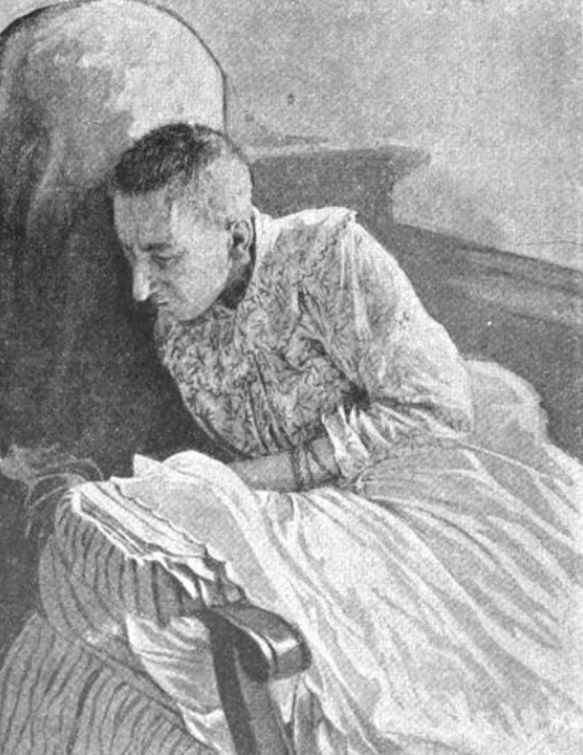
Blanche shortly after being discovered in 1901

Louise Monnier was arrested, became ill shortly afterwards and died 15 days later, after seeing an angry mob gather in front of her house. Marcel Monnier appeared in court and was initially convicted, but later was acquitted on appeal; he was deemed mentally incapacitated, and, although the judges criticised his choices, they found that a "duty to rescue" did not exist in the penal code at that time with sufficient rule to convict him. Marcel Monnier died in June 1913 at the age of 65 in Migné.

After she was released from the room, Monnier continued to have mental health problems. She was diagnosed with various disorders, including anorexia nervosa, (Note: Then written in French as "anorexie hystérique".) schizophrenia, exhibitionism, and coprophilia. This soon led to her admission to a psychiatric hospital in Blois, where she died on 13 October 1913, in apparent obscurity.

== Legacy ==
In 1930, André Gide published a book about the incident, titled La Séquestrée de Poitiers, changing little but the names of the protagonists.

== See also ==
- Catharina Ulrika Hjort af Ornäs, a Swedish noblewoman who was imprisoned by her husband in a room for 33 years, eventually dying of neglect and starvation
- Genie, a girl whose father kept her socially isolated until the age of 13 years and 7 months.
- Killing of Lacey Fletcher, a similar case from the US state of Louisiana where an emaciated woman was found dead in filthy conditions.
- List of kidnappings
- List of solved missing person cases
- List of long-term false imprisonment cases

== Bibliography ==
- Augustin, Jean-Marie. L'histoire véridique de la séquestrée de Poitiers. Fayard. 2001. ISBN 978-2213609515
- This Woman's Family Shockingly Locked Her Away In A Dungeon For 25 Years.
