= Forêt de Brotonne =

Coordinates: 49°27′N 0°43′E

The forêt de Brotonne (French pronunciation: [fɔʁɛ də bʁɔtɔn], Brotonne forest), in Normandy, France, is situated to the west of Rouen in a vast meander of the Seine, accessible by the pont de Brotonne.

It is a part of the Parc naturel régional des Boucles de la Seine normande (Regional natural parc of Boucles de la Seine normande), which allows for the safeguarding of a large natural space stretching from the banlieue of Rouen to the commune of Marais-Vernier.

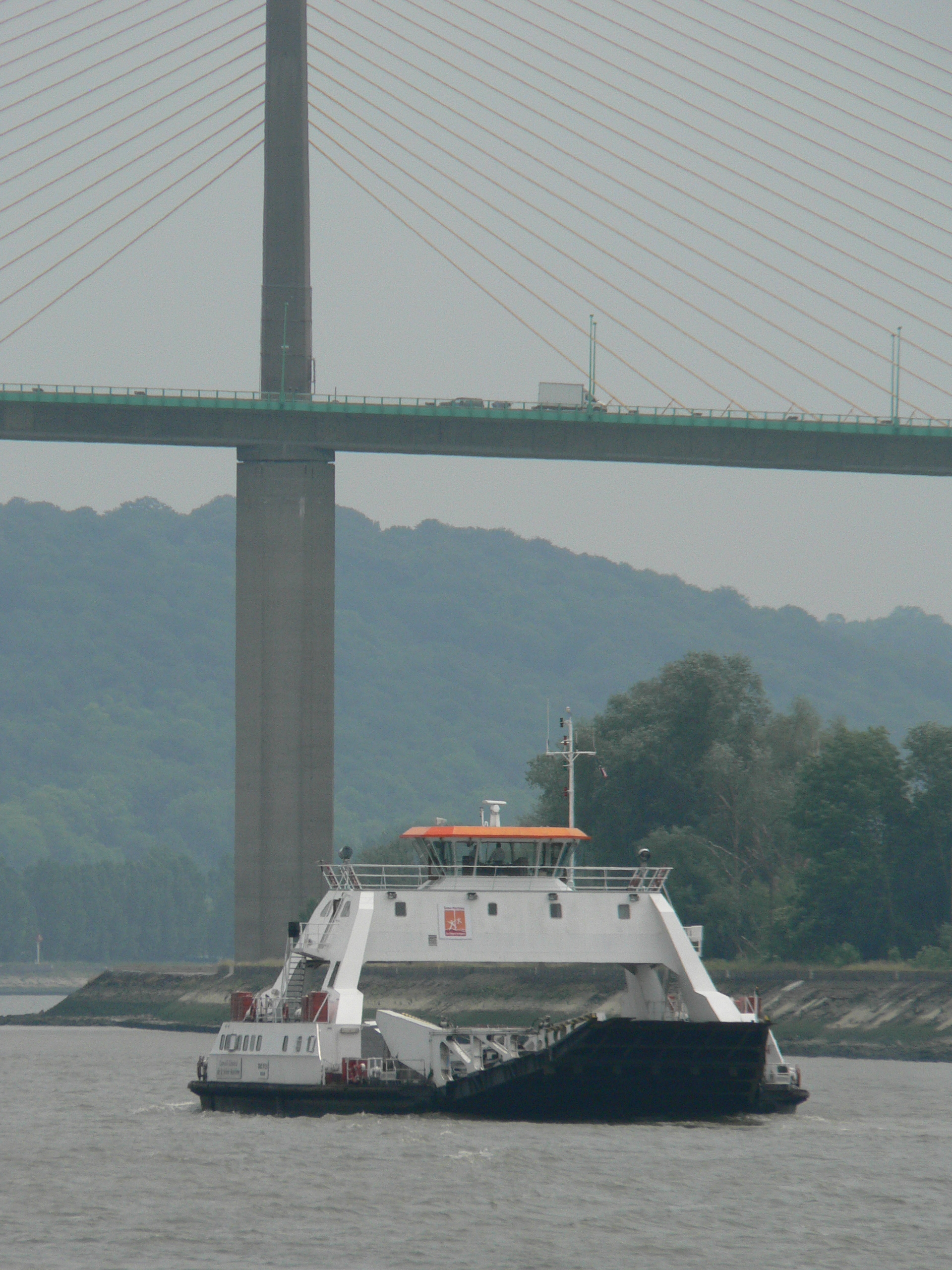
Pont de Brotonne linking Rouen to the Forêt de Brotonne

Today the forest encompasses an area 12 kilometres (7.5 mi) in length and 10 kilometres (6.2 mi) in width, and is divided by multiple forest roads. It contains more than ninety species of trees, notably oaks and beech. The state-owned section covers more than 6,700 hectares (17,000 acres) (out of a total 7,200 hectares (18,000 acres)). The forest is one of the largest beech forests in France, with 62% of its area of its surface covered in beech. In addition to beech and oaks, the forest also contains Scots Pines and Hornbeams. In addition to the trees, the forest also contains a windmill (the moulin-tour de Hauville) and a communal cottage (four à pain) of La Haye-De-Routot. The forest's western edge is bordered by the A131 autoroute.

== History ==
During the Ancient Roman period, the remainder of the primary forests were cleared (as deforestation had already most likely begun during the Neolithic Period in order to build large domains consisting of several farms). These were linked to new cities which were growing along the banks of the Seine, along with a new palace named le palais d'Arelaune. Some of the houses constructed during this period measured up to 150 metres (160 yd) long and 80 metres (87 yd) wide and were elegantly decorated.

At the entrance of the forest on the other side of the Seine, the Fontenelle Abbey was constructed during the reign of Clovis II, which marked the beginning of evangelicalism in the area. Later, during the reign of Thierry III, Condède, a Breton recluse saint moved to an island by the forest where he lived for fifteen years, attracting a number of pilgrims who continued to come even after his death to visit his tomb.
