= List of major crimes in France =

The following is a list of major crimes in France. They are arranged in chronological order.

== Timeline ==
- List of major crimes in France (before 1900)
- List of major crimes in France (1900–1999)
- List of major crimes in France (2000–present)
