= Marie Deluil-Martiny =

French religious sister

Blessed Marie Deluil-Martiny
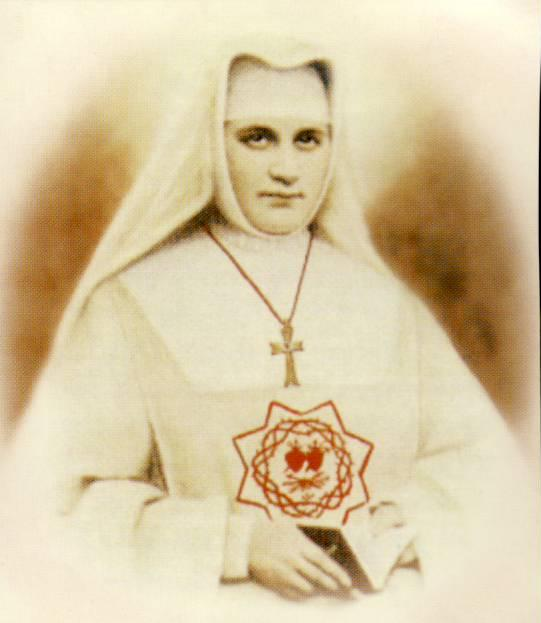

Virgin
- Born: 28 May 1841; Marseille, Bouches-du-Rhône, July Monarchy
- Died: 27 February 1884 (aged 42); Marseille, Bouches-du-Rhône, French Third Republic
- Venerated in: Roman Catholic Church
- Beatified: 22 October 1989, Saint Peter's Square, Vatican City by Pope John Paul II
- Feast: 27 February
- Attributes: Religious habit; Sacred Heart
- Patronage: Daughters of the Heart of Jesus

Marie Deluil-Martiny (28 May 1841 – 27 February 1884), known in religion as Marie of Jesus, was a French Catholic religious sister and the founder of the Daughters of the Heart of Jesus. She was murdered by the convent's gardener in 1884. She was beatified by Pope John Paul II in 1989.

== Life ==
Marie Deluil-Martiny was born in Marseille on 28 May 1841, the eldest of five children. Her father, Paul Deluil-Martiny, served in the legal profession. She had one brother and three sisters, the last of which was Clemence (1849-1859). She was baptized hours after her birth with the name "Marie-Caroline-Philomène". On the maternal side were a number of members who were nuns. She was also the great-niece of the Servant of God Madeleine Rémuzat (1696-1730). Maries education commenced at the age of eleven of which nuns oversaw.

Prior to the reception of her First Communion her parents sent her to a convent in Marseille to prepare for the sacrament. On one occasion she stopped her recreational activities and took a friend, Angelica, aside and confided her happiness at the imminent reception of the Eucharist and remained absorbed in that thought for several moments. She received her First Communion on 22 December 1853 and later received the sacrament of Confirmation on 29 January 1854 from the Bishop of Marseille, Eugène de Mazenod.

At the age of fifteen while still in school she gathered a small group of students and dubbed it the Oblates of Mary. This small group was short lived since the students' superiors discovered it and dissolved it as soon as it was learned it had been established. She made a retreat towards the end of her studies in which it proved decisive for her religious vocation. She began writing in a spiritual journal around this time. Martiny also refused several marriage offers around this time due to realizing her true purpose and her call to follow Jesus Christ.

She decided to go and hear Saint Jean-Marie Vianney preach but due to the number of people could not meet him. Yet the two later met when she found him kneeling in the church; the two spoke of her vocation and he encouraged her in this respect. In 1859 she returned and learned that her sister Clemence had died of an illness following the reception of her First Communion. Two sisters and her sole brother died in the time after this which left her alone with her parents. Her two grandmothers followed sometime in the 1860s.

On 9 March 1864 she founded the Association of the Guard of Honor of the Sacred Heart, now the Association of the Presence of Christ, which received canonical status on 7 June 1872.

She was invited in 1865 to make a spiritual retreat on the occasion of Pope Pius IX celebrating the beatification of Marguerite-Marie Alacoque. In December 1866 she heard the Jesuit Jean Calage (1805-1888) preach on the topic of the Sacred Heart and so revealed to him her desire to enter the religious life. She had spent numerous hours discerning this in front of the tabernacle. She made a solemn vow to remain chaste on 8 December 1867, the Feast of the Immaculate Conception. Father Calage became her spiritual director. On 20 June 1873, in the advice of him she founded the Daughters of the Heart of Jesus in Berchem and in 1875 completed the writing of their constitution according to the charism of Ignatius of Loyola. They received diocesan approval on 2 February 1876 from Cardinal Victor-Auguste-Isidor Deschamps. The first religious, which included Martiny, made their vows on 22 August 1878. She established their first convent on 24 June 1879.

In November 1883 Marie of Jesus hired the poor Louis Chave (b. 1862) as a gardener at the convent to better fortunes. But Chave demonstrated his laziness and his rude and demanding nature. Matters became worse when it was revealed that Chave was an anarchist. On 27 Ash Wednesday in 1884 he waited in ambush as the sisters passed during their recreation. He sprang out as she spoke kind words to him and he grabbed Marie of Jesus and shot her twice at point-blank range with a revolver; this wounded her in the carotid artery which caused her to collapse and, before she died, murmur: "I forgive him … for the Institute".

Her remains were interred with her parents and siblings in Marseille but were later transferred to Berchem in 1899 and then exhumed for canonical inspection (as part of the beatification proceedings) on 4 March 1989 when her remains were found both intact and flexible. Her remains were later moved to Rome on 28 September 2013.

As of 2005 there was a total of 50 sisters in six houses in nations such as Austria and Croatia. The congregation received the papal decree of praise on 25 February 1888 and the full papal approval of Pope Leo XIII on 2 February 1902.

== Beatification ==
The beatification process of Marie of Jesus commenced in an informative process that opened in both Marseille and in Mechelen-Brussels. Her spiritual journal, amongst other writings, were collected in order for theologians to grant approval to them as being orthodox in nature and not in contradiction with doctrine. Her cause was formally opened in Rome on 25 May 1921, granting her the title of Servant of God.

An apostolic process spanned from 1922 until 1924 and both processes received validation from the Congregation of Rites on 3 June 1924. The Congregation for the Causes of Saints received the positio in 1987 and passed it onto consulting theologians for their approval before meeting to discuss the cause themselves. These two groups both met in 1987 and answered in the affirmative. Pope John Paul II declared her to be venerable on 23 October 1987 after confirming that the Deluil-Martiny had lived a life of heroic virtue.

The miracle needed for beatification was investigated where it happened and received validation on 26 February 1988. A medical board assented to the miracle on 9 November 1988 while theologians followed on 7 March 1989 and the Congregation had their vote on 6 June 1989. The pope approved it on 7 September 1989 and beatified her on 22 October 1989.
