= Lysander (boat) =

Small sailing boat

A Lysander is a small sailing boat, belonging to a type often known as a trailer sailer or pocket cruiser. It was designed in Britain in 1963 by Percy Blandford, an author of woodworking and other practical titles, and designer of small boats.

It has twin fixed bilge keels, and a simple sail plan of headsail and mainsail. The original design was for Gunter rig, but there are also many Bermuda rig examples.

Percy Blandford produced the design with the amateur builder in mind, for building out of marine plywood over a simple frame. The design was so successful however that it was taken up by some professional yards, and GRP versions began to appear.

It is estimated that more than 4,000 crafts were built. Many are still in existence, and there is an active class association called the Lysander Owners Association.

== Key dimensions ==
- Length (LOA): 5.18 m (17 ft 0 in)
- Beam: 1.98 m (6 ft 6 in)
- Mainsail area: 8.4 m^{2} (90 sq ft)
- Headsail area: 2.8 m^{2} (30 sq ft)
- Draught: .687 m (2 ft 3.0 in)
- Weight: 800 lb (360 kg)
