= Lysandros (disambiguation) =

Lysandros (Λύσανδρος) is a Greek given name, most often associated with the Greek admiral Lysander. It can also refer to:

- Lysandros Dikaiopoulos (1916-1938), Greek footballer
- Lysandros Georgamlis (born 1962), Greek footballer
- Lysandros Kaftanzoglou (1811-1885), Greek architect
- Lysandros Vilaetis (1836-1860), Greek politician

== See also ==
- Bartolomeu Lysandro Airport in Campos dos Goytacazes, Brazil
