= Albert Lysander =

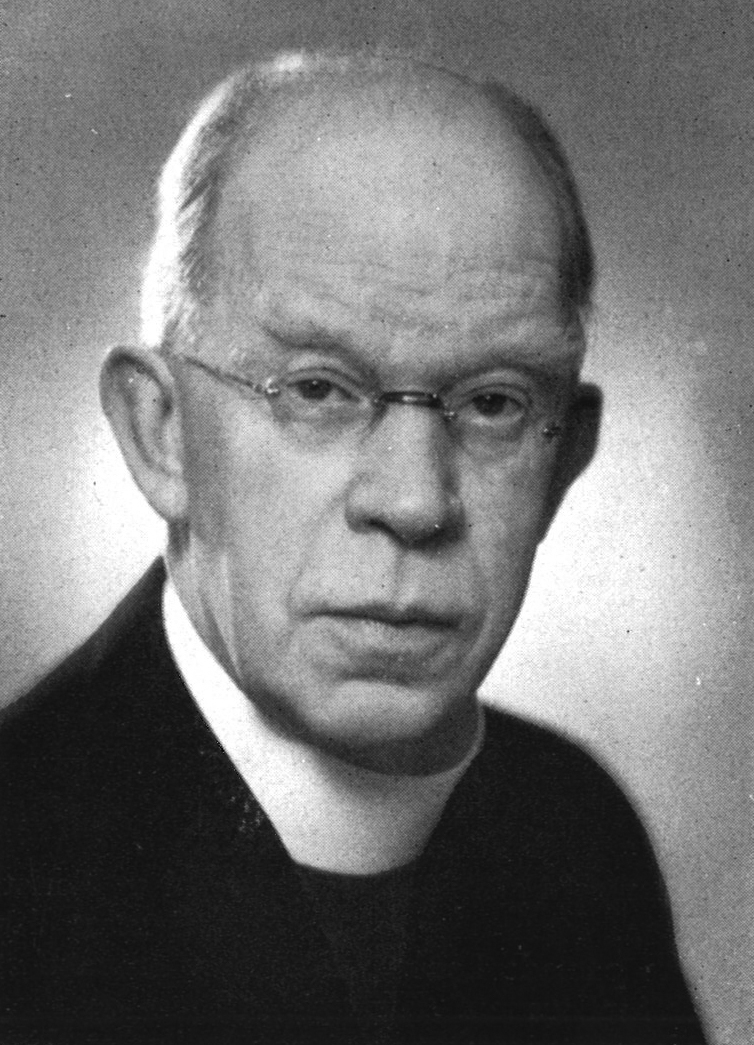
Albert Lysander

Albert Lysander (1875–1956) was a Swedish Lutheran priest and one of the early pioneers of the Swedish High Church movement.

While travelling in England, he visited the Cowley Fathers, Community of the Resurrection, and in London St Paul's Cathedral and All Saints, Margaret Street.

Lysander was parish priest of St Petri, Malmö.

In October, 1919, Lysander was the initiator in forming the Sodalitium Confessionis Apostolicæ (SCA), a moderately high church sodality for priests in Church of Sweden. SCA was founded in influenced of the Oxford Movement as protection against the emerging liberal theology, and to strengthen priestly identity and encourage a renewal of the Church on the apostolic foundation.
