= Vital d'Audiguier =

French poet and writer

Vital d'Audiguier (Najac, 1565 – Paris, 1624), was a French poet and writer. He was murdered as the result of a brawl over a gambling debt.

d'Audiguier's best known work was a swashbuckling chivalrous novel published anonymously in 1615, entitled Histoire tragi-comique de notre temps, but in subsequent editions titled Histoire des Amours de Lysandre et de Caliste.
