= Barras, Alpes-de-Haute-Provence =

Barras
- Commune
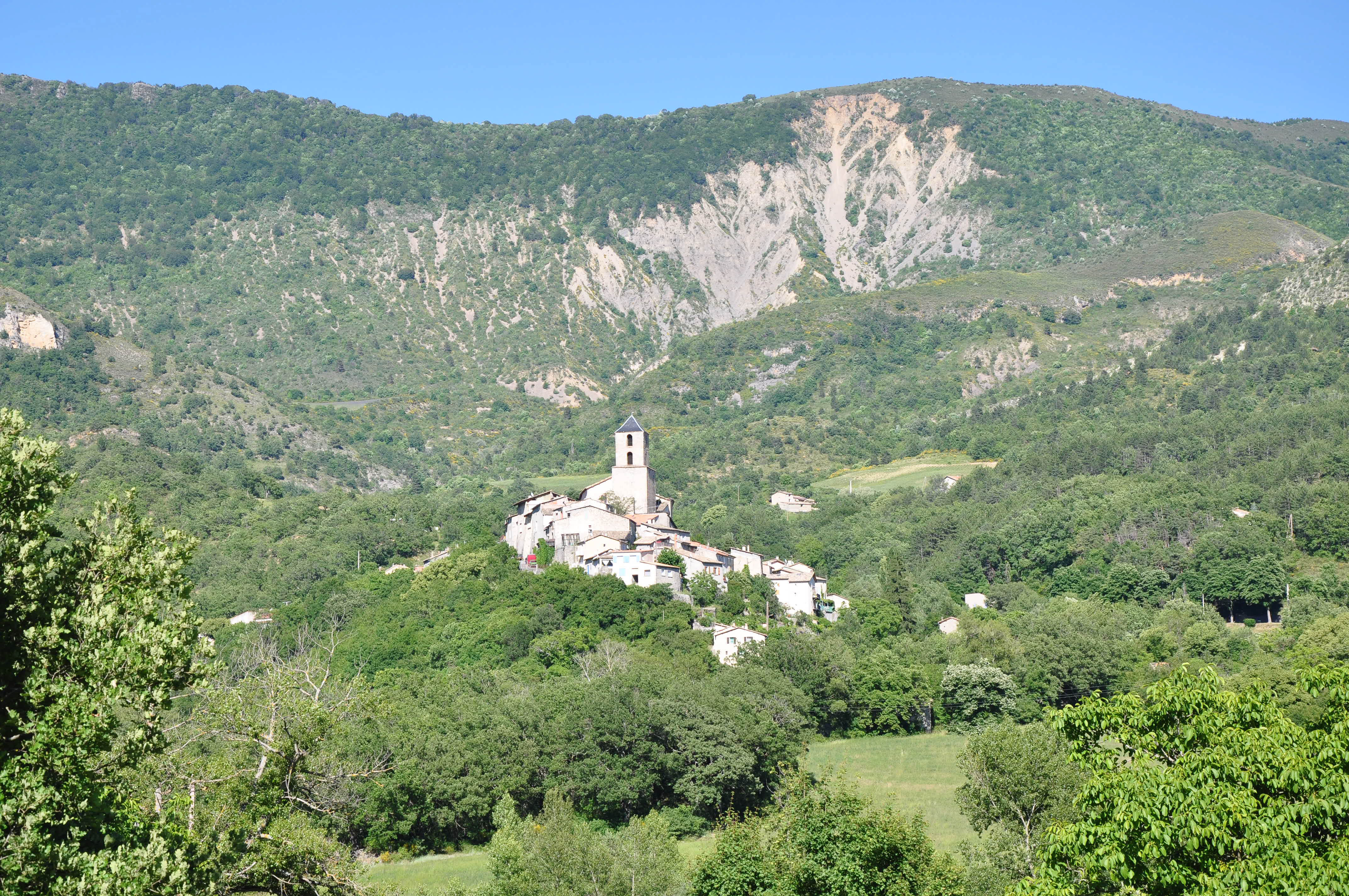
- Barras and the Ruth Summit

- Coat of arms
- Motto: "The bravery of Barras"
- Location of Barras
- Location within France Location within Provence-Alpes-Côte d'Azur
- Coordinates: 44°06′20″N 6°06′50″E
- Country: France
- Region: Provence-Alpes-Côte d'Azur
- Department: Alpes-de-Haute-Provence
- Arrondissement: Digne-les-Bains
- Canton: Digne-les-Bains-2
- Intercommunality: CA Provence-Alpes

Government
  - Mayor (2026–32): Rémy Gravière
- Area^{1}: 20.8 km^{2} (8.0 sq mi)
- Elevation: 625 m (2,051 ft)
- Highest elevation: 1,298 m (4,259 ft)
- Lowest elevation: 533 m (1,749 ft)
- Population (2023): 139
  - Density: 6.68/km^{2} (17.3/sq mi)
- Time zone: UTC+01:00 (CET)
  - Summer (DST): UTC+02:00 (CEST)
- INSEE/Postal code: 04021 /04380
- ^{1} French Land Register data, which excludes lakes, ponds, glaciers > 1 km^{2} (0.386 sq mi or 247 acres) and river estuaries.

Barras (French pronunciation: [baʁas]; Occitan: Barràs) is a commune in the Alpes-de-Haute-Provence department in the Provence-Alpes-Côte d'Azur region of south-eastern France.

The inhabitants of the commune are known as Barrasiens or Barrasiennes.

== Geography ==
Barras is located some 6 km west of Digne-les-Bains and 14 km south-east of Sisteron. The highest point in the commune is the summit of Ruth (1298m). The sole access to the commune is the D17 road which branches from Route nationale N85 at Mallemoisson and goes north through the commune and the village and continues north to join the D3 near Thoard. Apart from the village there are the hamlets of Les Bourguignons and Les Beauduns. The commune is mostly farmland on a fairly rugged landscape.

Les Duyes stream forms the eastern border of the commune as it flows south to join the Bléone west of Les Grillons. The Ravin de Vaunaves forms most of the north-eastern border as it flows south-east to join Les Duyes. The Ravin de Fulgon and the Ravin de Rostan rise in the west of the commune and flow east joining before flowing into Les Duyes. The Ravin de Barbarine forms part of the western border of the commune as it flows south to join Les Duyes in the south-eastern corner of the commune.

=== Natural and technological risks ===
None of the 200 communes in the department is in a no seismic risk zone. The Canton of Digne-les-Bains-2 to which Barras belongs is in area 1b (low risk) according to the deterministic classification of 1991 and based on its seismic history and in zone 4 (medium risk) according to the probabilistic classification EC8 of 2011. Barras also faces three other natural hazards:

- Forest fire
- Flooding (in the Duyes valley)
- Landslide: the commune's main concern with an average to high hazard

Barras is not exposed to any risk of technological origin identified by the prefecture.

There is no plan for prevention of foreseeable natural risks (PPR) for the commune and there is no DICRIM.

The commune was the subject of two natural disaster orders in 1994 for floods and mudslides (one order for the winter 1993-1994 and one for autumn).

== Toponymy ==
The locality appears for the first time in texts in 1202 (Barracio). According to Charles Rostaing it is from an oronymic (meaning mountain) root *BAR. According to Ernest Negro it comes from the Gallic barro with the augmentative suffix -as.

The toponym La Garde, above Tournefort, may refer to a fortified settlement of the 9th - 10th century and the name Bourguignons refers to the name of the people (Burgundians).

== History ==
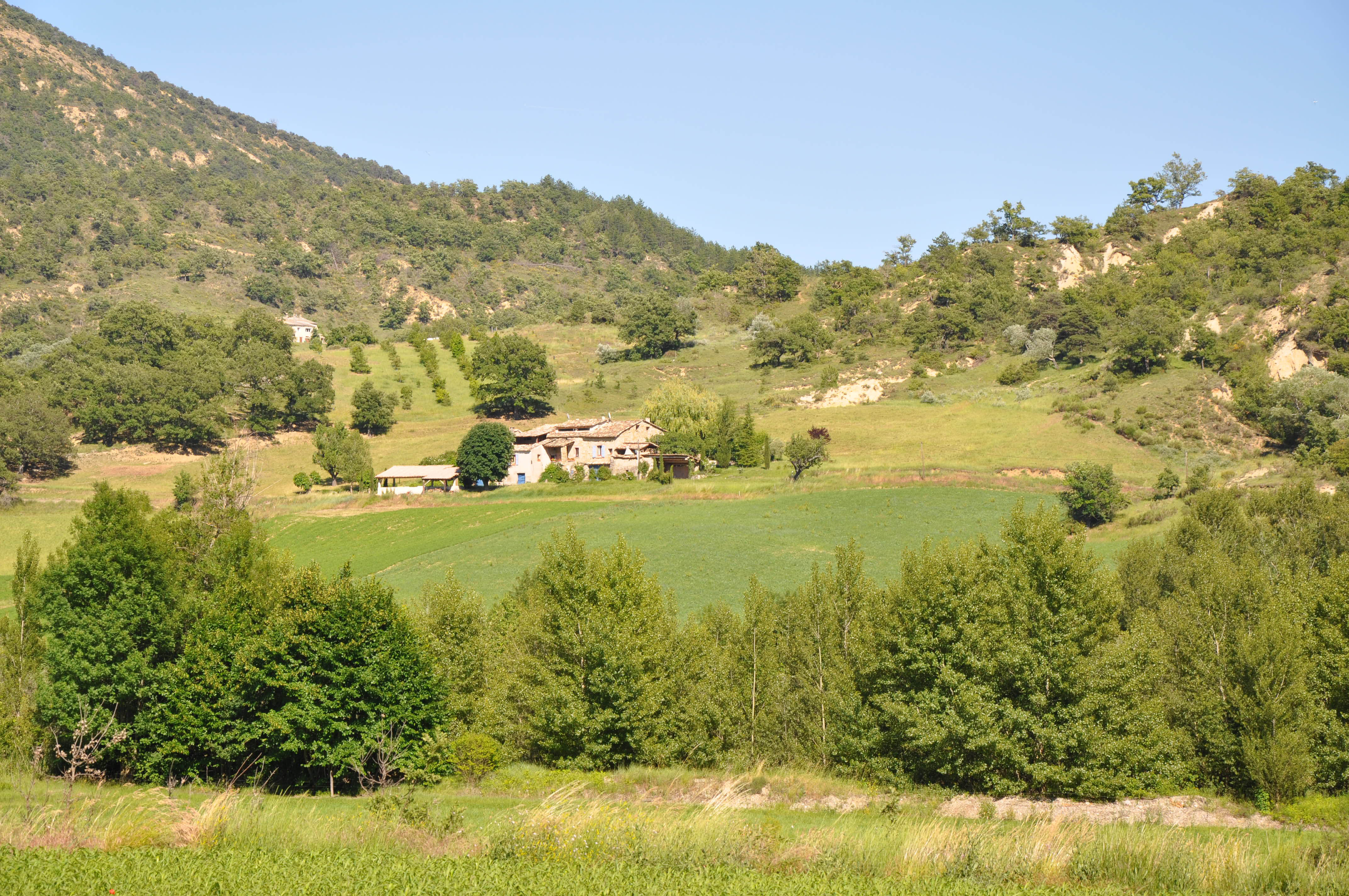
A hamlet in Barras where there are remains of a medieval settlement

In Ancient times, the Bodiontici populated the Bléone valley and its tributaries as well as the Gauls who lived in the current commune of Barras. The Bodiontici were defeated by Augustus at the same time as the other peoples present on the Tropaeum Alpium (before 14 BC.). Barras was attached to the province of Alpes-Maritimes at the time of its creation. An ancient settlement has been found at Saint-Pierre and Chapelier south of the village. The priory of Ganagobie Abbey existed in the 11th century.

In 1070 a person named Féraud donated the fiefdom of Beaucouse (now in the commune of Thoard) to the Abbey of Saint-Victor of Marseille. Most of the territory of Barras was part of this fief so Barras had the Abbey Saint-Victor as lord. At that time there was a large estate (villa) in Saint Domnin where the abbey installed a priory which passed to the Bishop of Gap in the 14th century.

The medieval community in Barras was characterized by scattered settlements. It had 37 fires in 1315. It was heavily depopulated by the crises of the 14th century (the Black Death and the Hundred Years War) and the population was eliminated in 1471. The smaller fief of Barras belonged to the counts of Provence until 1297 when Charles II of Naples gave it to a noble family which took the name of the fief (the Barras family). This family lasted until the 19th century and provided many officers such as Jean-Antoine Barras de la Penne (1650–1730) and Jacques Melchior Barras de Saint-Laurent (1719 to 1793).

The community of Tournefort was larger than that of Barras in the Middle Ages: it had 48 fires in 1315 but it was also heavily depopulated by the crises of the 14th century and declared uninhabited in 1400 then annexed by Barras in the 15th century. At the same time soldiers seized the castle of Tournefort and threatened the region through their raids and looting. After the successful siege of the castle of Briançonnet (during the same uprising), the army from Sisteron laid siege to Tournefort castle in 1393 and expelled the brigands.

The church was part of the Abbey of Chardavon (currently in the commune of Saint-Geniez) and the Abbey received the revenues attached to this church.

The Patriotic Society of Barras was created in 1791: it was one of the first in the Lower Alps, probably due to the fact that the parish priest, Jean Gaspard Gassend, was deputy to the States General. It corresponded at that time both with the Jacobin Club and the Feuillants Club.

Barras appears as Les Barras on the 1750 Cassini Map and the same on the 1790 version.

The Coup d'état of 2 December 1851 committed by Louis-Napoleon Bonaparte against the French Second Republic provoked an armed uprising in the Lower Alps in defence of the Constitution. After the failure of the uprising harsh repression continued on those who stood up to defend the Republic: 5 inhabitants of Barras were brought before the Joint Committee.

As with many communes in the department, Barras had a school well before the Jules Ferry laws: in 1863 the school already provided a primary education for boys. By contrast no instruction was given to girls: neither the Falloux Laws (1851), which required the opening of a girls' school in communes with more than 800 inhabitants, nor the first Duruy Law (1867), which lowered the threshold to 500 inhabitants, concerned Barras. The second Duruy Act (1877) allowed it, thanks to government subsidies, to build a new school but it was only after the Ferry laws that the village girls were enrolled.

Until the middle of the 20th century vines were cultivated in Barras. The wine product was of poor quality and was intended for local consumption. This culture is now abandoned. Similarly, olive trees, grown on small areas in the 19th century up to an altitude of 600 metres and exceptionally up to 700 metres, are now gone.

=== Heraldry ===
Arms of Barras	Blazon: Barry of 6 Or and Azure.

== Administration ==
List of successive mayors

From	To	Name	Party
1945	1947	Danton Legay	Former French Resistance SE
2001	2008	Bertin Jassend	
2008	incumbent	Rémy Gravière	

=== Education ===
The commune has a primary school.

== Demography ==
Historical population

Year	Pop.	±% p.a.
1793	326	—
1821	244	−1.03%
1846	277	+0.51%
1872	269	−0.11%
1901	167	−1.63%
1926	153	−0.35%
1946	130	−0.81%
1962	113	−0.87%
1968	109	−0.60%

Year	Pop.	±% p.a.
1975	93	−2.24%
1982	84	−1.44%
1990	111	+3.55%
1999	121	+0.96%
2007	152	+2.89%
2012	145	−0.94%
2017	142	−0.42%
2023	139	−0.36%

Source: EHESS and INSEE

The demographic history of Barras, after the decimation in the 14th and 15th centuries and the gradual growth until the beginning of the 19th century, is marked by a period of "slack" where the population remained relatively stable at a high level. This period lasted from 1806 to 1861. The rural exodus then caused a movement of long-term population decline. In 1926 the town had lost over half of its population compared to the historical peak of 1836. The downward movement was interrupted in the 1980s. Since then the population of Barras overtook the threshold of 150 inhabitants equivalent to half that of 1836.

== Economy ==
=== General overview ===
In 2017 the active population was 67 people including 5 unemployed. These workers are mostly employees (65%) and mainly work outside the commune (71%).

=== Agriculture ===
At the end of 2015 the primary sector (agriculture, forestry) had seven active establishments within the meaning of Insee and no salaried jobs.

According to Agreste survey by the Ministry of Agriculture the number of farms increased slightly in the 2000s, going from ten to eleven, mainly sheep and cattle farms. From 1988 to 2000, the utilised agricultural area (UAA) increased sharply from 311 hectares to 1289 while the number of farms fell from 14 to 11. The UAA declined slightly during the past decade, but remains at a high level at 1215 hectares.

The commune is included in the scope of the Appellation d'origine contrôlée Huile d'olive de Provence AOC (Olive oil of Provence AOC).

=== Service activities ===
At the end of 2015 the tertiary sector (trade, services) had seven establishments with three employees, to which can be added four administrative institutions employing four people.

According to the Departmental Observatory of Tourism, the tourist function is of secondary importance to the town with less than one tourist received per capita with no facilities at all in the commune.

There are 10 second homes in the commune.

== Culture and heritage ==
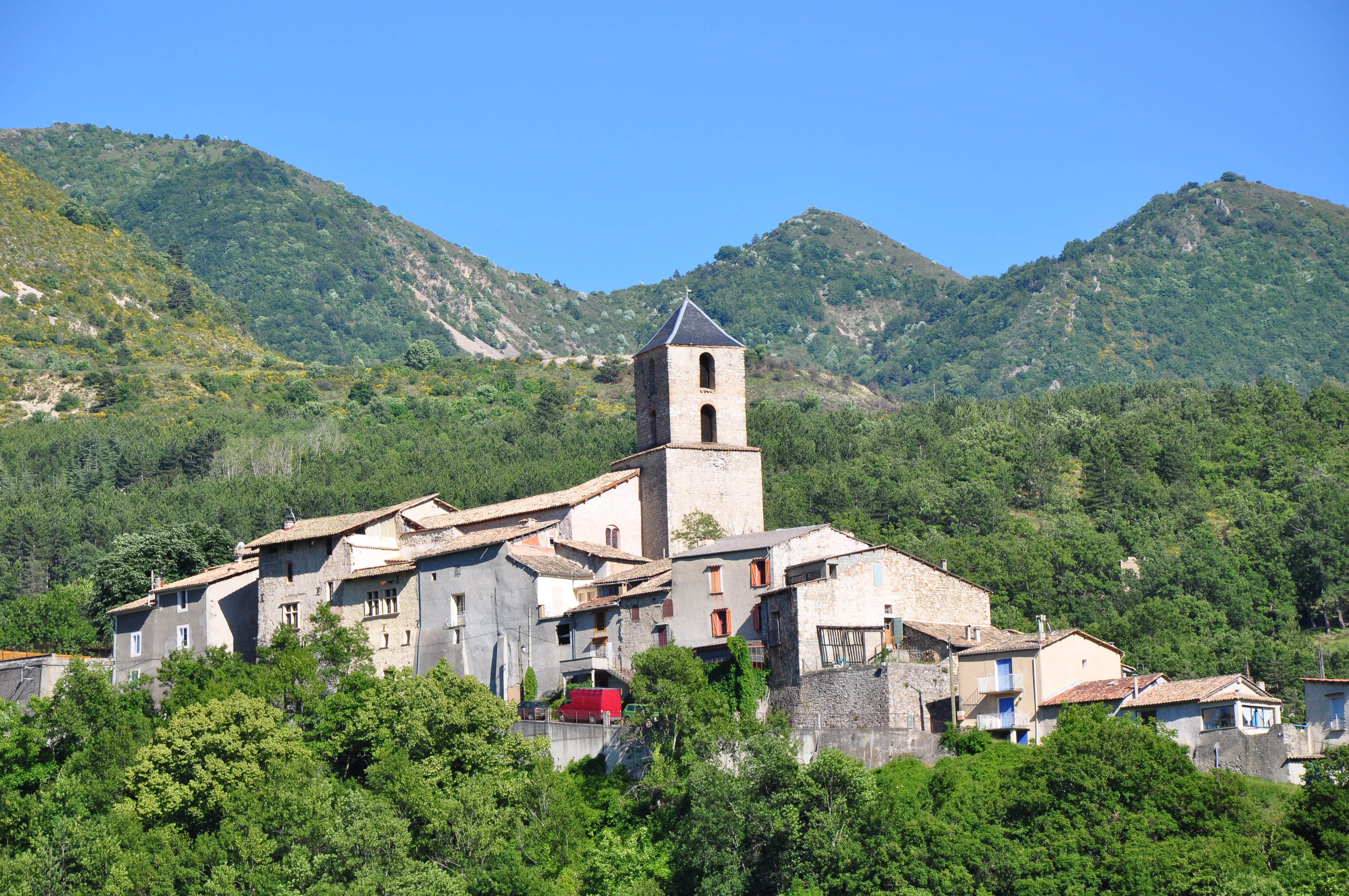
The Church of Saint Nicolas

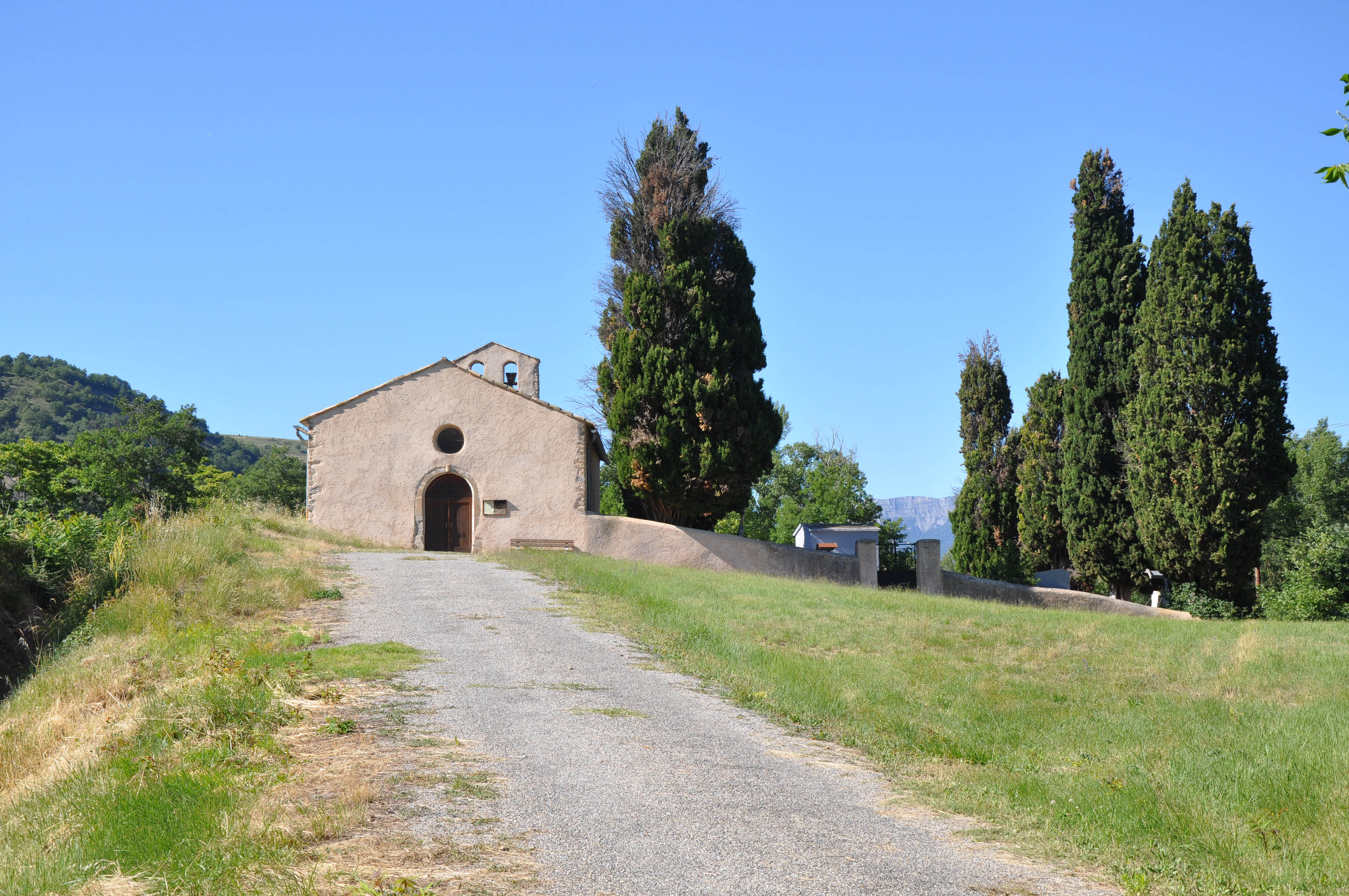
Saint-Pierre Chapel and cemetery

=== Religious heritage ===
The Church of Saint Nicolas (17th century) has a bell tower with arches and two windows above the church. The nave rises to the roof. The door indicates a date in the 17th century. Its Retable is decorated with a common theme of the Donation of the Rosary.

The church contains a baptismal font (19th century) that is registered as an historical object.

The commune also has three chapels in ruins:

- Saint Louis Chapel from 1732 in the village with a small steeple, converted into a henhouse
- Saint Peter's Cemetery Chapel, Romanesque, is the old parish church.
- Saint Valentine's Chapel, on a hill overlooking the village of Mirabeau, existed in the 17th century, but was in ruins at the end of the 19th century.

== Notable people linked to the commune ==
- Jean Gaspard Gassend, deputy in the States General of 1789
- Paul Barras (1755–1829), revolutionary, Viscount of Barras

== See also ==
- Communes of the Alpes-de-Haute-Provence department

=== Bibliography ===
- Raymond Collier, Haute-Provence, monumental and artistic, Digne, Louis Jean Printing,1986, 559 p.
- Under the direction of Édouard Baratier, Georges Duby, and Ernest Hildesheimer, Historical Atlas, Provence, Venaissin County, Principality of Orange, County of Nice, Principality of Monaco, Paris, Librairie Armand Colin, 1969 (Record BNF No. FRBNF35450017h)
