= Le Chaffaut-Saint-Jurson =

- Commune
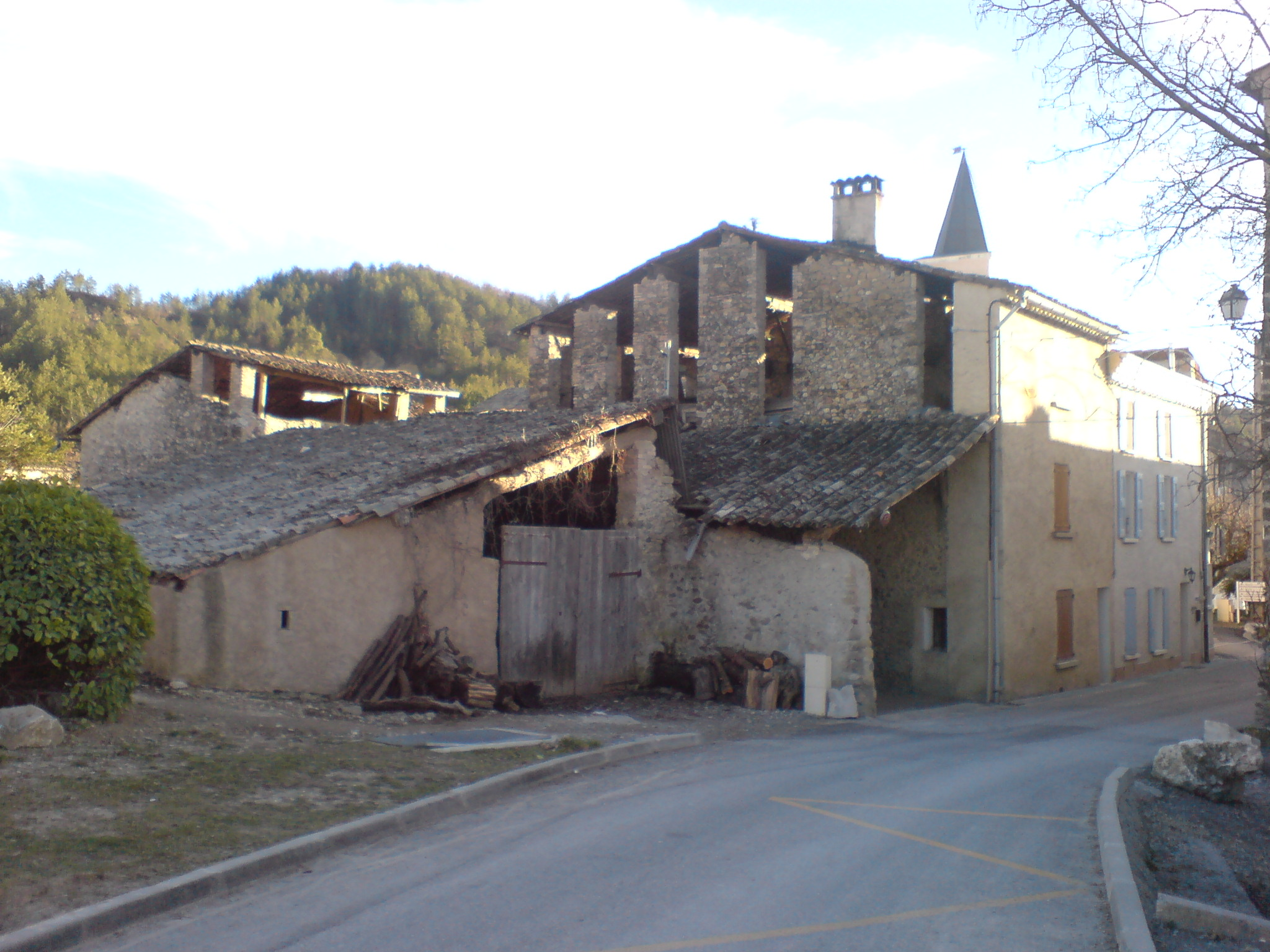
- A barn in the village of Le Chaffaut-Saint-Jurson

- Coat of arms
- Location of Le Chaffaut-Saint-Jurson
- Location within France Location within Provence-Alpes-Côte d'Azur
- Coordinates: 44°02′20″N 6°09′03″E
- Country: France
- Region: Provence-Alpes-Côte d'Azur
- Department: Alpes-de-Haute-Provence
- Arrondissement: Digne-les-Bains
- Canton: Riez
- Intercommunality: CA Provence-Alpes

Government
  - Mayor (2026–32): Ghislaine Menc
- Area^{1}: 36.2 km^{2} (14.0 sq mi)
- Elevation: 584 m (1,916 ft)
- Highest elevation: 960 m (3,150 ft)
- Lowest elevation: 470 m (1,540 ft)
- Population (2023): 693
  - Density: 19.1/km^{2} (49.6/sq mi)
- Time zone: UTC+01:00 (CET)
  - Summer (DST): UTC+02:00 (CEST)
- INSEE/Postal code: 04046 /04510
- ^{1} French Land Register data, which excludes lakes, ponds, glaciers > 1 km^{2} (0.386 sq mi or 247 acres) and river estuaries.

Le Chaffaut-St-Jurson (French pronunciation: [lə ʃafo sɛ̃ ʒyʁsɔ̃]; Occitan: Lo Chafauc e Sant Jurson) is a commune in the Alpes-de-Haute-Provence department in southeastern France.

== Geography ==
The village is located at an altitude of 584 meters, in the valley of the Bléone.

The differents commune adjacent to Le Chaffaut-Saint-Jurson are Aiglun, Digne-les-Bains, Châteauredon, Mézel, Saint-Jeannet, Malijai, Mirabeau, Mallemoisson.

=== Toponymy ===
The locality of Chaffaut appeared for the first time in the texts between 1064 and 1079 (in Kadalfucho). The term comes from the north-occitan translating cadalfac, naming a house with an outside staircase and a balcony according to Ernest Nègre, from catafalicum, meaning scaffold or siege tower according to Bénédicte and Jean-Jacques Fénié.

Saint-Jurson is a deformation of the name of the holy patron saint of the church, saint Georges, apostle of the Velay.

== Population ==
Historical population
Year	Pop.	±% p.a.
1968	196	—
1975	229	+2.25%
1982	346	+6.07%
1990	510	+4.97%
1999	674	+3.15%
2007	702	+0.51%
2012	755	+1.47%
2017	689	−1.81%
2023	693	+0.10%
Source: INSEE

== See also ==
- Communes of the Alpes-de-Haute-Provence department
