= Antoinette Des Houlières =

Antoinette Des Houlières may refer to:

- Antoinette du Ligier de la Garde Deshoulières (1638–1694), French poet
- Antoinette-Thérèse Des Houlières (1659–1718), French poet, daughter of the above
