= Pierre Gassendi =

French priest, astronomer, and mathematician (1592–1655)

The Reverend Pierre Gassendi
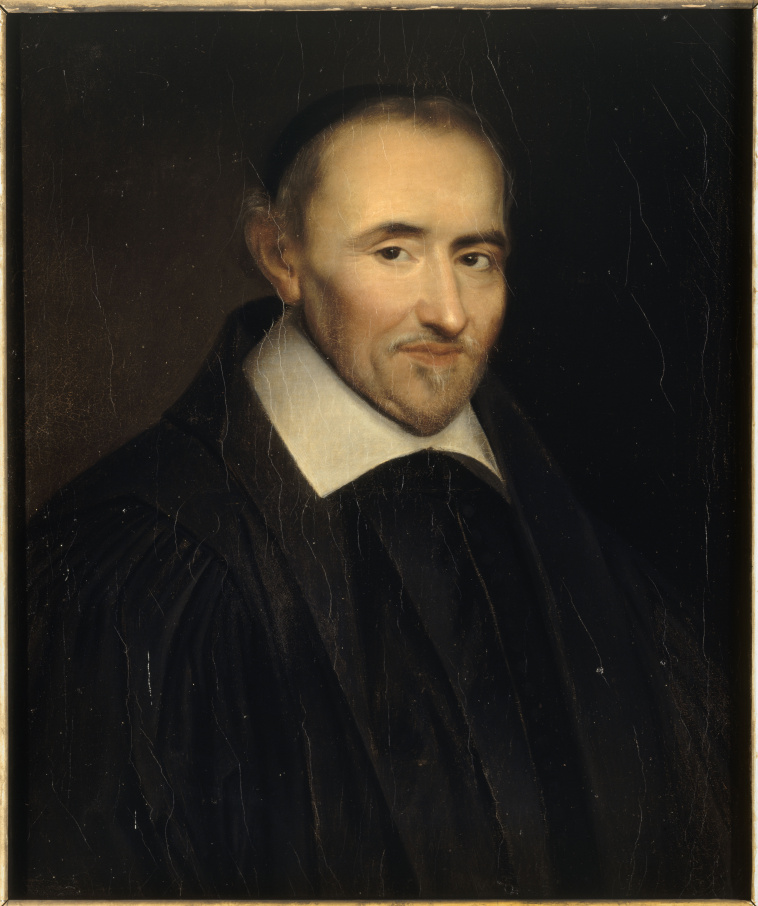
- Portrait by Louis-Édouard Rioult
- Born: Pierre Gassend; 22 January 1592; Champtercier, Provence, Kingdom of France
- Died: 24 October 1655 (aged 63); Paris, Kingdom of France

Education
- Education: University of Aix-en-Provence; University of Avignon (Th.D., 1614)
- Academic advisor: Peirescius

Philosophical work
- Era: 17th-century philosophy
- Region: Western philosophy
- School: Aristotelianism; Epicureanism; Atomism; Empiricism; Nominalism; Materialism; Corpuscularianism; Theological voluntarism
- Institutions: University of Aix-en-Provence; Collège Royal
- Main interests: Philosophical logic, physics, ethics
- Notable ideas: Calor vitalis (vital heat)

Pierre Gassendi (French: [pjɛʁ gasɛ̃di]; born Pierre Gassend, Latinized Petrus Gassendus; 22 January 1592 – 24 October 1655) was a French philosopher, Catholic priest, astronomer, and mathematician. While he held a church position in south-east France, he also spent much time in Paris, where he was a leader of a group of free-thinking intellectuals. He was also an active observational scientist, publishing the first data on the transit of Mercury in 1631. The lunar crater Gassendi is named after him.

He wrote numerous philosophical works, and some of the positions he worked out are considered significant, finding a way between skepticism and dogmatism. Richard Popkin indicates that Gassendi was one of the first thinkers to formulate the modern "scientific outlook", of moderated skepticism and empiricism. He clashed with his contemporary Descartes on the possibility of certain knowledge. His best known intellectual project attempted to reconcile Epicurean atomism with Christianity.

== Biography ==
=== Early life ===
Gassendi was born at Champtercier, near Digne, in France to Antoine Gassend and Françoise Fabry. His earliest education was entrusted to his maternal uncle, Thomas Fabry, the curé of the church of Champtercier. A youthful prodigy, at a very early age he showed academic potential and attended the collège (the town high school) at Digne, where he displayed a particular aptitude for languages and mathematics. In 1609 he entered the University of Aix-en-Provence, to study philosophy under Philibert Fesaye, O.Carm. at the Collège Royal de Bourbon (the Faculty of Arts of the University of Aix). In 1612 the college of Digne called him to lecture on theology. While at Digne, he travelled to Senez, where he received minor orders from Bishop Jacques Martin. In 1614 he received the degree of Doctor of Theology from the University of Avignon, and was elected Theologian in the Cathedral Chapter of Digne. On 1 August 1617 he received holy orders from Bishop Jacques Turricella of Marseille. In the same year, at the age of 24, he accepted the chair of philosophy at the University of Aix-en-Provence, and yielded the chair of theology to his old teacher, Fesaye. Gassendi seems gradually to have withdrawn from theology. He maintained his position as Canon Theologian at Digne, however, and in September 1619, when Bishop Raphaël de Bologne took possession of the diocese of Digne, Gassendi participated and made the speech on behalf of the Chapter.

He lectured principally on the Aristotelian philosophy, conforming as far as possible to the traditional methods while he also followed with interest the discoveries of Galileo and Kepler. He came into contact with the astronomer Joseph Gaultier de la Vallette (1564–1647), the Grand Vicar of the Archbishopric of Aix.

=== Priesthood ===
In 1623 the Society of Jesus took over the University of Aix. They filled all positions with Jesuits, so Gassendi was required to find another institution. He left, returning to Digne on 10 February 1623, and then returned to Aix to witness an eclipse of the moon on 14 April and the presence of Mars in Sagittarius on 7 June, from which he returned again to Digne. He travelled to Grenoble on behalf of the Chapter of Digne for a lawsuit, most reluctantly, since he was working on his project on Aristotle's paradoxes. In 1624 he printed the first part of his Exercitationes paradoxicae adversus Aristoteleos. A fragment of the second book later appeared in print at The Hague (1659), but Gassendi never composed the remaining five, apparently thinking that the Discussiones Peripateticae of Francesco Patrizzi left little scope for him.

He spent some time with his patron Nicolas-Claude Fabri de Peiresc (Peirescius). After 1628 Gassendi travelled in Flanders and in Holland where he encountered Isaac Beeckman and François Luillier. He returned to France in 1631. In 1634 the Cathedral Chapter of Digne had become disgusted at the wasteful behavior of Provost Blaise Ausset, and they voted to replace him. They obtained an arrêt of the Parliament of Aix, dated 19 December 1634, which consented to his deposition and to the election of Gassendi as provost of the Cathedral Chapter. Gassendi was formally installed on 24 December 1634. He held the Provostship until his death in 1655.

During this time he wrote some works, at the insistence of Marin Mersenne. They included his examination of the mystical philosophy of Robert Fludd, an essay on parhelia, and some observations on the transit of Mercury.

=== 1640s ===
Gassendi then spent some years travelling through Provence with the duke of Angoulême, governor of the region. During this period he wrote only the one literary work, his Life of Peiresc, whose death in 1637 seemed to afflict him deeply; it received frequent reprintings and an English translation. He returned to Paris in 1641, where he met Thomas Hobbes. He gave some informal philosophy classes, gaining pupils or disciples; according to the biographer Grimarest, these included Molière, Cyrano de Bergerac (whose participation in classes is disputed), Jean Hesnault and Claude-Emmanuel Chapelle, son of Lullier.

In 1640 Mersenne engaged him in controversy with René Descartes. His objections to the fundamental propositions of Descartes appeared in print in 1641; they appear as the Fifth Set of Objections in the works of Descartes and as a separate edition entitled Disquisitio Metaphysica with rejoinders. Though Descartes is often credited with the discovery of the mind-body problem, Gassendi, reacting to Descartes' mind-body dualism, was the first to state it. Gassendi's tendency towards the empirical school of speculation appears more pronounced here than in any of his other writings. Jean-Baptiste Morin attacked his De motu impresso a motore translato (1642). In 1643 Mersenne also tried to garner support from the German Socinian and advocate of religious tolerance Marcin Ruar. Ruar replied at length that he had already read Gassendi but was in favour of leaving science to science not to the church.

In 1645 he accepted the chair of mathematics in the Collège Royal in Paris, and lectured for several years with great success. In addition to controversial writings on physical questions, there appeared during this period the first of the works for which historians of philosophy remember him. In 1647 he published the well-received treatise De vita, moribus, et doctrina Epicuri libri octo. Two years later appeared his commentary on the tenth book of Diogenes Laërtius. In the same year he had published the more important commentary Syntagma philosophiae Epicuri.

In 1648 ill-health compelled him to give up his lectures at the Collège Royal. Around this time he became reconciled to Descartes, after years of coldness, through the good offices of César d'Estrées.

=== Death and memorial ===
Gassendi travelled in the south of France in the company of his protégé, aide and secretary François Bernier, another pupil from Paris. He spent nearly two years at Toulon, where the climate suited him. In 1653 he returned to Paris and resumed his literary work, living in the house of Montmor, publishing in that year lives of Copernicus and of Tycho Brahe. The disease from which he suffered, a lung complaint, had, however, established a firm hold on him. His strength gradually failed, and he died at Paris in 1655. A bronze statue of him (by Joseph Ramus) was erected by subscription at Digne in 1852. A large crater on the Moon is named after him.

== Scientific achievements ==
As part of his promotion of empirical methods and his anti-Aristotelian and anti-Cartesian views, Gassendi was responsible for a number of scientific 'firsts':

- He explained parhelia in 1629 as due to ice crystals.
- In 1631, Gassendi became the first person to observe the transit of a planet across the Sun, viewing the transit of Mercury that Kepler had predicted. In December of the same year, he watched for the transit of Venus, but this event occurred when it was night time in Paris.
- Use of camera obscura to gauge the apparent diameter of the Moon.
- Dropping a stone from the mast of a ship (in De motu) conserves horizontal momentum, removing an objection to the rotation of the Earth.
- Measurement of speed of sound (to about 25% accuracy), showing that it is invariant of pitch.
- Satisfactory interpretation of Pascal's Puy-de-Dôme experiment with a barometer in the late 1640s; this suggested a created vacuum is possible.
- He asserted and defended (in Syntagma philosophiae Epicuri, 1649) the notion that matter is made of atoms, following Epicurus.

In addition to these achievements, Gassendi performed work on determining longitude via eclipses of the Moon and on improving the Rudolphine Tables. He addressed the issue of free fall in De motu (1642) and De proportione qua gravia decidentia accelerantur (1646).

== Writings ==
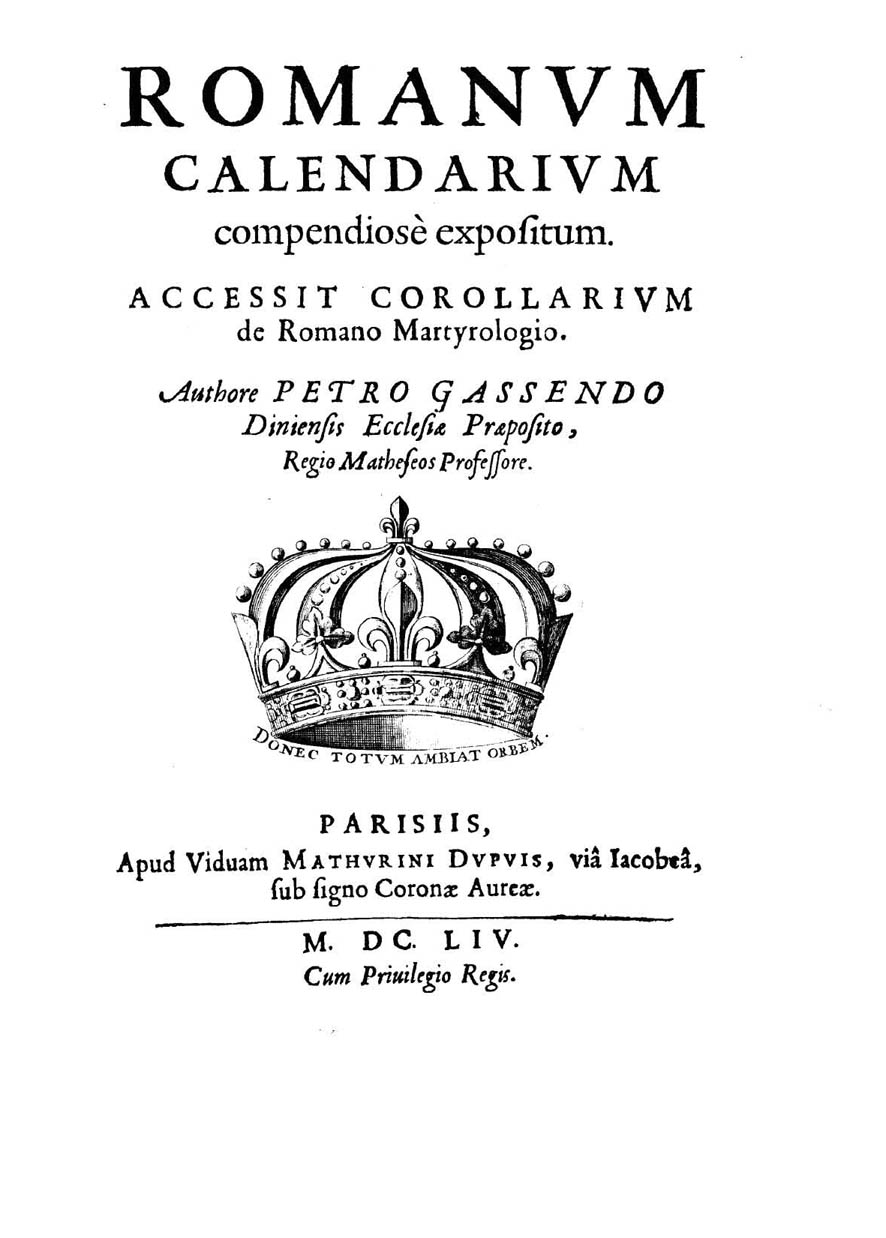
Romanum calendarium

Edward Gibbon styled him "Le meilleur philosophe des littérateurs, et le meilleur littérateur des philosophes" (The greatest philosopher among literary men, and the greatest literary man among philosophers).

Henri Louis Habert de Montmor published Gassendi's collected works, most importantly the Syntagma philosophicum (Opera, i. and ii.), in 1658 (6 vols., Lyons). Nicolaus Averanius published another edition, also in 6 folio volumes, in 1727. The first two comprise entirely his Syntagma philosophicum; the third contains his critical writings on Epicurus, Aristotle, Descartes, Robert Fludd and Herbert of Cherbury, with some occasional pieces on certain problems of physics; the fourth, his Institutio astronomica, and his Commentarii de rebus celestibus; the fifth, his commentary on the tenth book of Diogenes Laërtius, the biographies of Epicurus, Nicolas-Claude Fabri de Peiresc, Tycho Brahe, Nicolaus Copernicus, Georg von Peuerbach, and Regiomontanus, with some tracts on the value of ancient money, on the Roman calendar, and on the theory of music, with an appended large and prolix piece entitled Notitia ecclesiae Diniensis; the sixth volume contains his correspondence. The Lives, especially those of Copernicus, Tycho and Peiresc, received much praise.

=== Exercitationes ===
The Exercitationes excited much attention, though they contain little or nothing beyond what others had already advanced against Aristotle. The first book expounds clearly, and with much vigour, the evil effects of the blind acceptance of the Aristotelian dicta on physical and philosophical study. The second book, which contains the review of Aristotle's dialectic or logic, throughout reflects Ramism in tone and method. One of the objections to Descartes became famous through Descartes's statement of it in the appendix of objections in the Meditations.

=== Animadversiones ===
His book Animadversiones, published in 1649, contains a translation of Diogenes Laërtius, Book X on Epicurus, and appeared with a commentary, in the form of the Syntagma philosophiae Epicuri. His labors on Epicurus have historical importance, but he has been criticized for holding doctrines arguably irreconcilable with his strong expressions of empiricism.

In the book, Gassendi maintains his maxim "that there is nothing in the intellect which has not been in the senses" (nihil est in intellectu quod non prius fuerit in sensu), but he contends that the imaginative faculty (phantasia) is the counterpart of sense, because it involves material images, and therefore is intrinsically material, and that it is essentially the same both in men and brutes. However, he also admits that the classic qualifier of humanity, intellect, which he affirms as immaterial and immortal, comes to an understanding of notions and truths that no effort of sensation or imagination could have attained (Op. ii. 383). Gassendi illustrates the capacity to form "general notions"; the conception of universality (ib. 384), which he says brutes never are able to partake in, though they utilize phantasia as truly as men; the notion of God, whom he says we may imagine as corporeal, but understand as incorporeal; and lastly, the reflex by which the mind makes the phenomena and operations within it the objects of its attention.

The English Epicurean Walter Charleton produced an English adaptation of this book, Physiologia Epicuro-Gassendo-Charletonia, in 1654.

=== Syntagma philosophicum ===
The Syntagma philosophicum is divided, according to the usual fashion of the Epicureans, into logic (which, with Gassendi, as with Epicurus, is truly canonic), physics, and ethics.

The logic contains a sketch of the history of the science De origine et varietate logicae, and is divided into theory of right apprehension (bene imaginari), theory of right judgment (bene proponere), theory of right inference (bene colligere), theory of right method (bene ordinare). The first part contains the specially empirical positions which Gassendi afterwards neglects or leaves out of account. The senses, the sole source of knowledge, supposedly yield us immediate cognition of individual things; phantasy (which Gassendi takes as material in nature) reproduces these ideas; understanding compares these ideas, each particular, and frames general ideas. Nevertheless, he admits that the senses yield knowledge—not of things—but of qualities only, and that we arrive at the idea of thing or substance by inductive reasoning. He holds that the true method of research is the analytic, rising from lower to higher notions; yet he sees and admits that inductive reasoning, as conceived by Francis Bacon, rests on a general proposition not itself proved by induction. The whole doctrine of judgment, syllogism and method mixes Aristotelian and Ramist notions.

In the second part of the Syntagma, the physics, appears the most glaring contradiction between Gassendi's fundamental principles. While approving of the Epicurean physics, he rejects the Epicurean negation of God and particular providence. He states the various proofs for the existence of an immaterial, infinite, supreme Being, asserts that this Being is the author of the visible universe, and strongly defends the doctrine of the foreknowledge and particular providence of God. At the same time he holds, in opposition to Epicureanism, the doctrine of an immaterial rational soul, endowed with immortality and capable of free determination. Friedrich Albert Lange claimed that all this portion of Gassendi's system contains nothing of his own opinions, but is introduced solely from motives of self-defence.

The positive exposition of atomism has much that is attractive, but the hypothesis of the calor vitalis (vital heat), a species of anima mundi (world-soul) which he introduces as a physical explanation of physical phenomena, does not seem to throw much light on the special problems which he invokes it to solve. Nor is his theory of the weight essential to atoms as being due to an inner force impelling them to motion in any way reconcilable with his general doctrine of mechanical causes.

In the third part, the ethics, over and above the discussion on freedom, which on the whole is indefinite, there is little beyond a milder statement of the Epicurean moral code. The final end of life is happiness, and happiness is harmony of soul and body (tranquillitas animi et indolentia corporis). Probably, Gassendi thinks, perfect happiness is not attainable in this life, but it may be in the life to come.

== Views ==
According to Gabriel Daniel, Gassendi was a little Pyrrhonian in matters of science; but that was no bad thing. He wrote against the magical animism of Robert Fludd, and judicial astrology. He became dissatisfied with the Peripatetic system, the orthodox approach to natural philosophy based on the writings of Aristotle. Gassendi shared an empirical tendency of the age. He contributed to the objections against Aristotelian philosophy, but waited to publish his own thoughts.

There remains some controversy as to the extent to which Gassendi subscribed to the so-called libertinage érudit, the learned free-thinking that characterised the Tétrade, the Parisian circle to which he belonged, along with Gabriel Naudé and two others (Élie Diodati and François de La Mothe Le Vayer). Gassendi, at least, belonged to the fideist wing of the sceptics, arguing that the absence of certain knowledge implied the room for faith.

In his dispute with Descartes he did apparently hold that the evidence of the senses remains the only convincing evidence; yet he maintains, as is natural from his mathematical training, that the evidence of reason is absolutely satisfactory.

=== Vegetarianism ===
Gassendi acknowledged that while the complete realisation of the continual pursuit of ultimate pleasure through communion with God might not occur in one's lifetime, he argued against the consumption of meat, considering it a significant obstacle to achieving a divine vision. Drawing support from scripture and the natural world, he envisioned a restored paradise where humans and animals coexisted in peaceful dominion, contrary to the tyranny displayed in the butchering of animals for pleasure.

Gassendi supported his case for vegetarianism with arguments from medicine, history, and scripture. Inspired by Neoplatonic vegetarians and early Christian thinkers, he aligned vegetarianism with Christian doctrines, emphasizing the immortality of the soul. Gassendi, a Catholic priest, advocated for a plant-based diet without dogmatism, asserting that decisions in this lifetime were crucial for preparing the body and mind for the next. He admired the historical virtue of vegetarian practitioners and urged scholars to extract and follow the best ideas from throughout history, asserting that, especially among humanists, a vegetarian lifestyle should be embraced.

Gassendi himself was not a vegetarian, but admitted that "if I were wise, I would abandon [meat] bit by bit, and nourish myself solely on the gifts on the earth ... I do not doubt that I would be happier for longer and more constantly in better health."

== Early commentary ==
Samuel Sorbière, a disciple, recounts Gassendi's life in the first collected edition of the works, by Joseph Bougerel, Vie de Gassendi (1737; 2nd ed., 1770); as does Jean Philibert Damiron, Mémoire sur Gassendi (1839). An abridgment of his philosophy was given by his friend, the celebrated traveller, François Bernier (Abrégé de la philosophie de Gassendi, 8 vols., 1678; 2nd ed., 7 vols., 1684).

== See also ==
- Ontological pluralism
- List of Roman Catholic scientist-clerics
