= Antoinette du Ligier de la Garde Deshoulières =

French poet

Antoinette Deshoulières
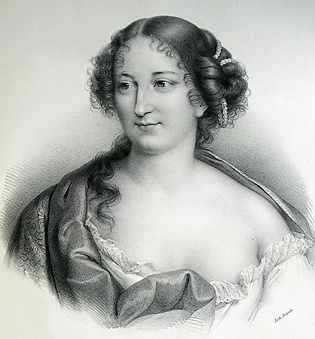
- Posthumous portrait of Deshoulières from 1798 or 1840
- Born: Antoinette du Ligier de la Garde; January 1, 1638 Paris
- Died: February 17, 1694 (aged 56) Paris
- Occupation: Poet
- Years active: c. 1651 or 1672 – 1694

Antoinette Du Ligier de la Garde Deshoulières (French pronunciation: [ɑ̃twanɛt dy liʒje də la ɡaʁd dezuljɛʁ]; January 1, 1638 – February 17, 1694) was a French poet.

== Early life and education ==
Antoinette Du Ligier de la Garde was born in Paris, January 1, 1638. (Note: Chisholm (1911) states her birth year as 1634.) She was the daughter of Melchior du Ligier, sieur de la Garde, maitre d'hôtel to the queens Marie de Medici and Anne of Austria.

She received a complete education; acquiring a knowledge of Latin, Spanish, and Italian, and studying prosody under the direction of the poet Jean Hesnault.

== Career ==
At the age of thirteen, she married Guillaume de Boisguerin, seigneur Deshoulières, who followed the prince of Condé as lieutenant-colonel of one of his regiments to Flanders about a year after the marriage. Madame Deshoulières returned for a time to the house of her parents, where she gave herself to writing poetry and studying the philosophy of Gassendi.

She rejoined her husband at Rocroi, near Brussels, where, being distinguished for her personal beauty, she became the object of embarrassing attentions on the part of the prince of Condé. Having made herself obnoxious to the government by her urgent demand for the arrears of her husband's pay, she was imprisoned in the château of Vilvorde. After a few months, she was freed by her husband, who attacked the château at the head of a small band of soldiers. An amnesty having been proclaimed, they returned to France, where Madame Deshoulières soon became a conspicuous personage at the court of Louis XIV and in literary society.

She won the friendship and admiration of the most eminent literary men of the age—some of her more zealous flatterers even going so far as to style her the tenth muse and the French Calliope. Her poems were very numerous, and included representatives of nearly all the minor forms of poetry: odes, eclogues, idylls, elegies, chansons, ballads, madrigals, and others. Of these, the idylls alone, and only some of them, have stood the test of time, the others being entirely forgotten. She wrote several dramatic works, the best of which did not rise to mediocrity. Her friendship for Corneille made her take sides for the Phedre of Pradon against that of Racine. Voltaire pronounced her the best of women French poets; and her reputation with her contemporaries is indicated by her election as a member of the Academy of the Ricovrati of Padua and of the Academy of Aries.

== Later life and death ==
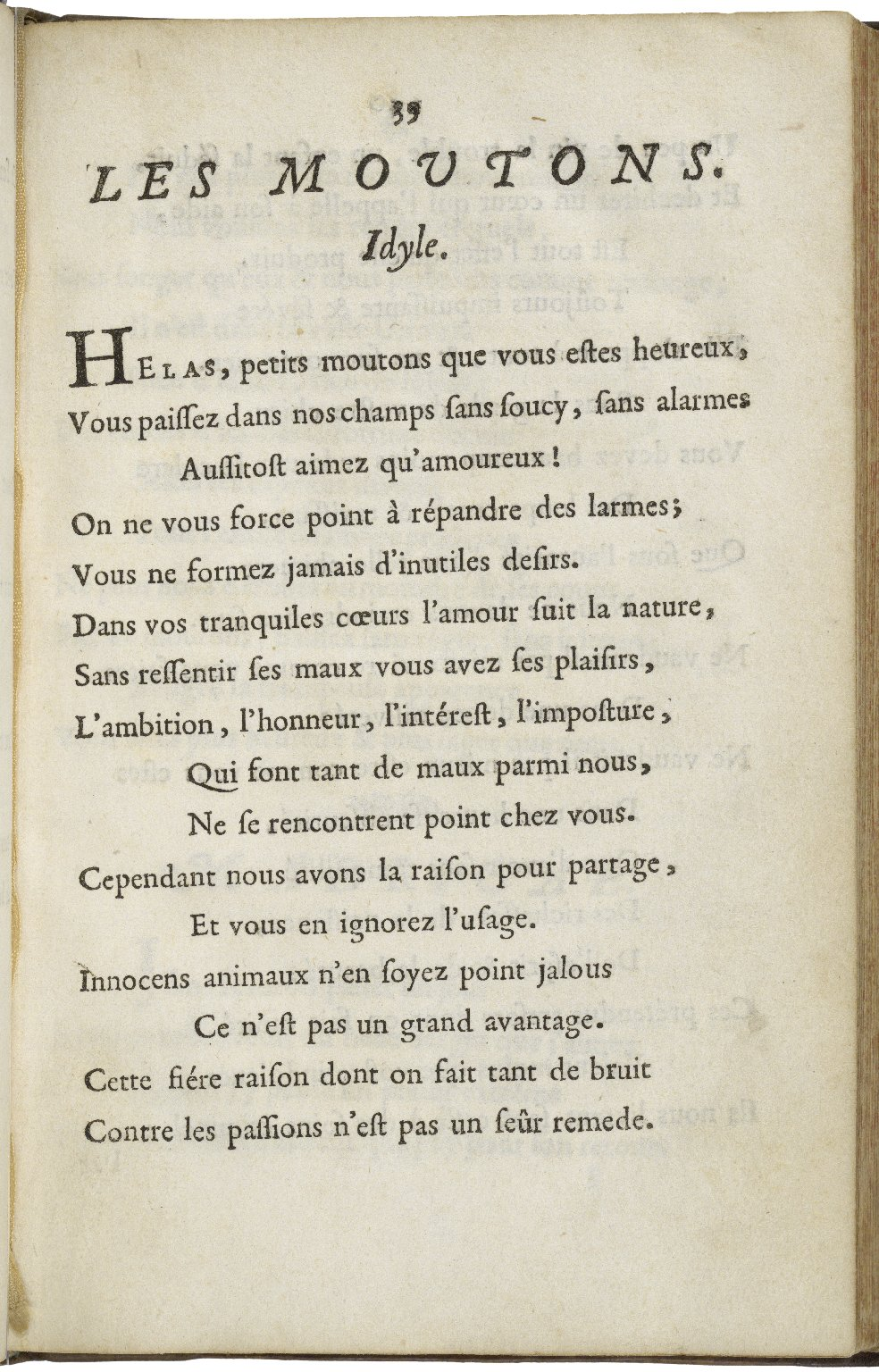
"Les Moutons" from Deshoulières' Poësies, printed in 1688.

In 1688, a pension of 2000 livres was bestowed upon her by the king, and she was thus relieved from the poverty in which she had long lived. She died in Paris on February 17, 1694. Complete editions of her works were published at Paris in 1695, 1747, etc. These include a few poems by her daughter, Antoinette-Thérèse Des Houlières, who inherited her talent.
