= Canton of Digne-les-Bains-2 =

Coordinates: 44.08°N 6.21°E

- Canton
- Situation of the canton of Digne-les-Bains-2 in the department of Alpes-de-Haute-Provence
- Country: France
- Region: Provence-Alpes-Côte d'Azur
- Department: Alpes-de-Haute-Provence
- No. of communes: {{{nbcomm}}}
- Population (2023): 12,638
- INSEE code: 0405

The canton of Digne-les-Bains-2 is an administrative division of the Alpes-de-Haute-Provence department, in southeastern France. It was created at the French canton reorganisation which came into effect in March 2015. Its seat is in Digne-les-Bains.

It consists of the following communes:

1. Aiglun
2. Barras
3. Champtercier
4. Digne-les-Bains (partly)
5. Malijai
6. Mallemoisson
7. Mirabeau
