= Antoinette-Thérèse Des Houlières =

French poet

Antoinette-Thérèse Deshoulières
- Born: 31 May 1659; Rocroi, France
- Died: 8 August 1718 (aged 59); Paris, France
- Occupation: Poet

Antoinette-Thérèse Deshoulières (Rocroi, 31 May 1659 – Paris, 8 August 1718) was a French poet.

== Biography ==
The daughter of Antoinette du Ligier de la Garde Deshoulières, she managed to publish her mother's works. La mort de Cochon which she wrote is a tragi-comedy in the manner of Corneille. The heroes are Cochon, the dog of the Duke of Vivonne, and Grisette, the cat of Antoinette des Houlières. This subject shows the relations which the two ladies of Houlières maintained with the court of France. Her mother, Corneille himself, were her teachers, as well as the poet Benserade, who said "Daughter of a wonder and wonder herself". She was a member of the Accademia Galileiana. She and her mother both died of breast cancer. Antoinette-Thérèse was buried at Eglise Saint-Roch in Paris on 9 August 1718, in the cellar of the Chapel of the Virgin.

== Works ==
- Œuvres de Madame Deshoulières et de Mademoiselle Deshoulières. Volume 1 (288 pages) Read online on Gallica
- Œuvres de Madame Deshoulières et de Mademoiselle Deshoulières. Nouvelle édition augmentée… Volume 2 (378 pages) Read online on Gallica
- Ode crowned by the Académie française
