= Champtercier =

- Commune
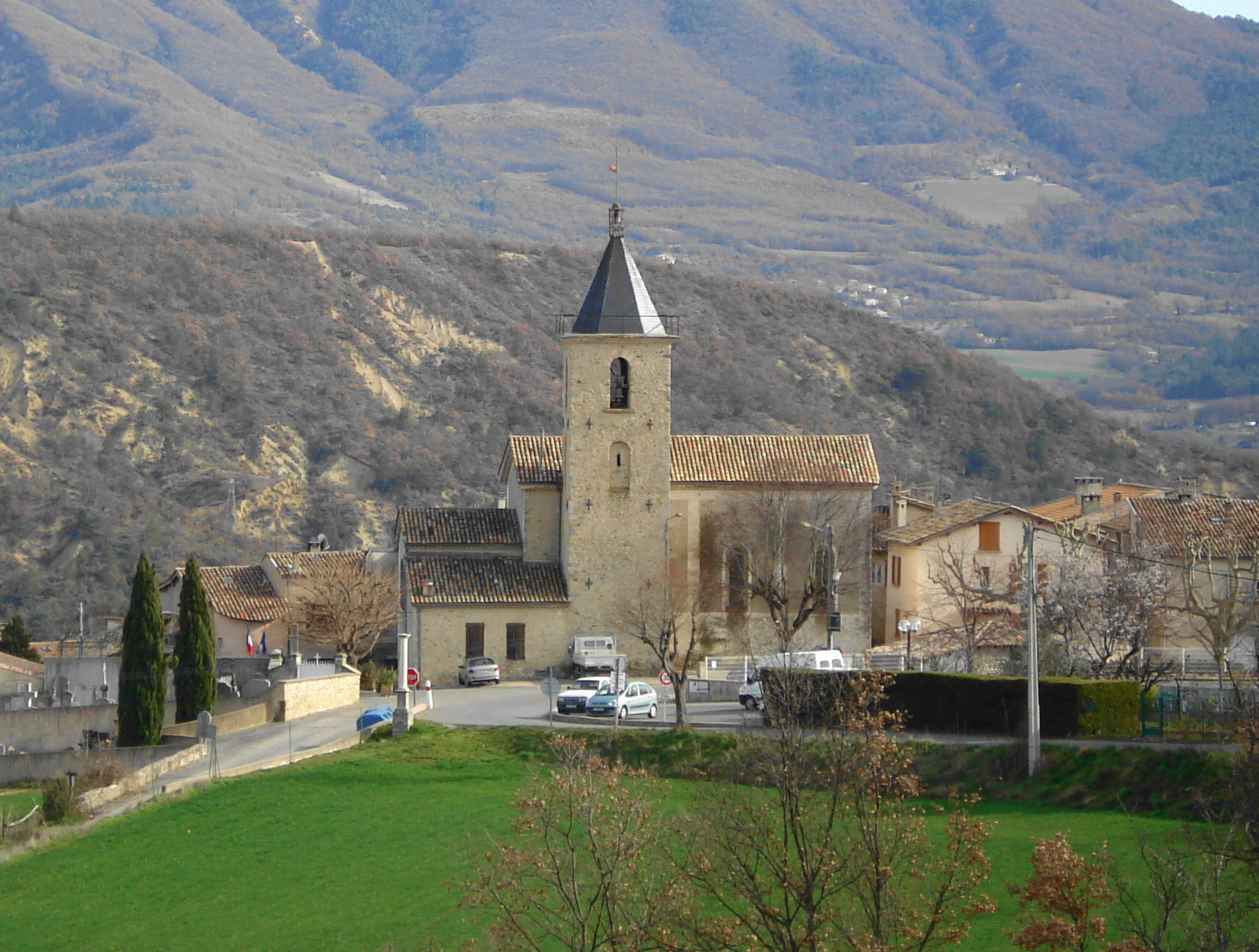
- The church in Champtercier

- Coat of arms
- Location of Champtercier
- Location within France Location within Provence-Alpes-Côte d'Azur
- Coordinates: 44°05′46″N 6°09′51″E
- Country: France
- Region: Provence-Alpes-Côte d'Azur
- Department: Alpes-de-Haute-Provence
- Arrondissement: Digne-les-Bains
- Canton: Digne-les-Bains-2
- Intercommunality: CA Provence-Alpes

Government
  - Mayor (2026–32): Sildric Esmiol
- Area^{1}: 18.31 km^{2} (7.07 sq mi)
- Elevation: 700 m (2,300 ft)
- Highest elevation: 1,140 m (3,740 ft)
- Lowest elevation: 587 m (1,926 ft)
- Population (2023): 750
  - Density: 41/km^{2} (110/sq mi)
- Time zone: UTC+01:00 (CET)
  - Summer (DST): UTC+02:00 (CEST)
- INSEE/Postal code: 04047 /04660
- ^{1} French Land Register data, which excludes lakes, ponds, glaciers > 1 km^{2} (0.386 sq mi or 247 acres) and river estuaries.

Champtercier (French pronunciation: [ʃɑ̃tɛʁsje]) is a commune in the Alpes-de-Haute-Provence department in southeastern France.

== Population ==
Historical population
Year	Pop.	±% p.a.
1968	163	—
1975	285	+8.31%
1982	363	+3.52%
1990	527	+4.77%
1999	693	+3.09%
2007	785	+1.57%
2012	772	−0.33%
2017	844	+1.80%
2023	750	−1.95%
Source: INSEE

== See also ==
- Communes of the Alpes-de-Haute-Provence department
