= Montmor =

Montmor is a surname. Notable people with the surname include:

- Pierre Habert de Montmor (1581–1636), French ecclesiastic and coadjutor
- Henri Louis Habert de Montmor (1600–1679), French scholar, man of letters, and nephew of the above
  - Montmor Academy, based in the house of the above, it lasted from 1657 until 1664
- Louis Habert de Montmor (1644–1695), French ecclesiastic, bishop of Elne-Perpignan, and son of the above

== See also ==
- Hôtel de Montmor, a private mansion located in the 3rd arrondissement of Paris that lasted from 1630 until 1925
