= Thoard =

- Commune
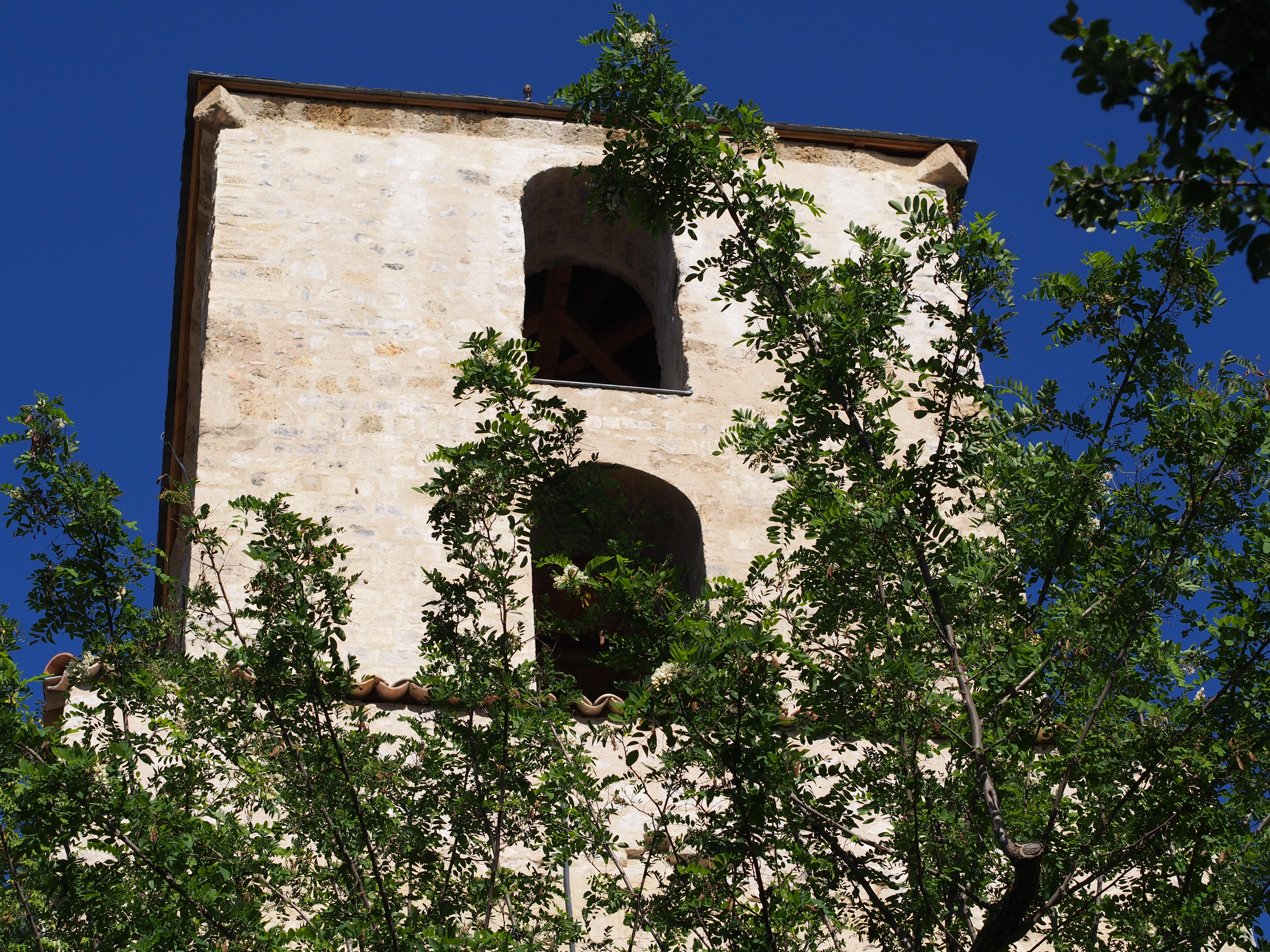
- The bell tower of the church of Our Lady of Bethlehem, in Thoard

- Coat of arms
- Location of Thoard
- Location within France Location within Provence-Alpes-Côte d'Azur
- Coordinates: 44°09′02″N 6°08′56″E
- Country: France
- Region: Provence-Alpes-Côte d'Azur
- Department: Alpes-de-Haute-Provence
- Arrondissement: Digne-les-Bains
- Canton: Digne-les-Bains-1
- Intercommunality: CA Provence-Alpes

Government
  - Mayor (2026–32): Denis Baille
- Area^{1}: 43.69 km^{2} (16.87 sq mi)
- Elevation: 765 m (2,510 ft)
- Highest elevation: 1,652 m (5,420 ft)
- Lowest elevation: 667 m (2,188 ft)
- Population (2023): 744
  - Density: 17.0/km^{2} (44.1/sq mi)
- Time zone: UTC+01:00 (CET)
  - Summer (DST): UTC+02:00 (CEST)
- INSEE/Postal code: 04217 /04380
- ^{1} French Land Register data, which excludes lakes, ponds, glaciers > 1 km^{2} (0.386 sq mi or 247 acres) and river estuaries.

Thoard (French pronunciation: [tɔaʁ]; Occitan: Toard) is a commune in the Alpes-de-Haute-Provence department in southeastern France.

== Population ==
Historical population
Year	Pop.	±% p.a.
1968	407	—
1975	423	+0.55%
1982	487	+2.03%
1990	564	+1.85%
1999	646	+1.52%
2007	712	+1.22%
2012	732	+0.56%
2017	723	−0.25%
2023	744	+0.48%
Source: INSEE

== See also ==
- Communes of the Alpes-de-Haute-Provence department
