= Mirabeau, Alpes-de-Haute-Provence =

Mirabeau
- Commune
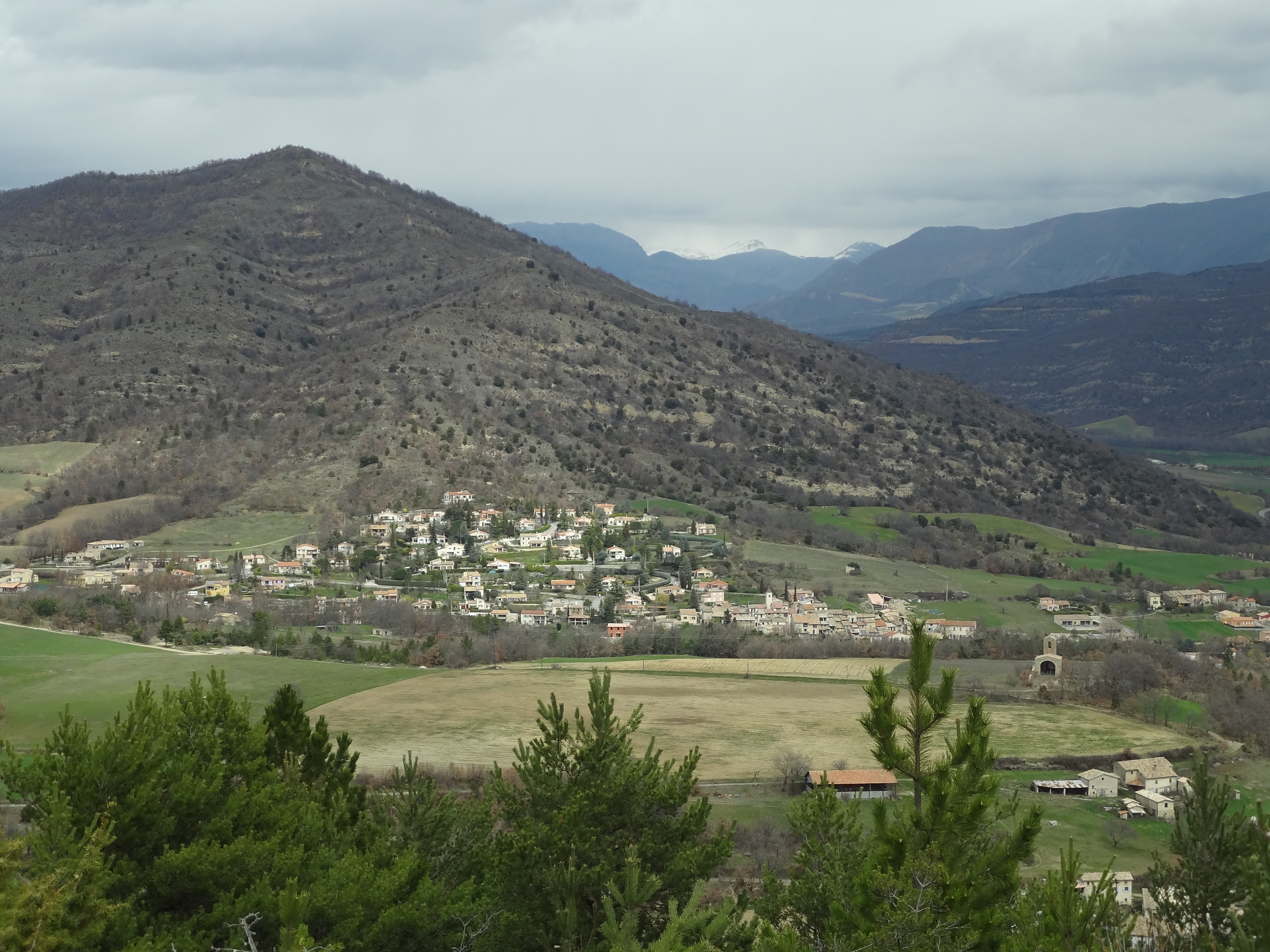
- A general view of the village of Mirabeau

- Coat of arms
- Location of Mirabeau
- Location within France Location within Provence-Alpes-Côte d'Azur
- Coordinates: 44°03′49″N 6°05′27″E
- Country: France
- Region: Provence-Alpes-Côte d'Azur
- Department: Alpes-de-Haute-Provence
- Arrondissement: Digne-les-Bains
- Canton: Digne-les-Bains-2
- Intercommunality: CA Provence-Alpes

Government
  - Mayor (2026–32): Hugo Decroix
- Area^{1}: 18.22 km^{2} (7.03 sq mi)
- Elevation: 650 m (2,130 ft)
- Highest elevation: 1,053 m (3,455 ft)
- Lowest elevation: 437 m (1,434 ft)
- Population (2023): 522
  - Density: 28.6/km^{2} (74.2/sq mi)
- Time zone: UTC+01:00 (CET)
  - Summer (DST): UTC+02:00 (CEST)
- INSEE/Postal code: 04122 /04510
- ^{1} French Land Register data, which excludes lakes, ponds, glaciers > 1 km^{2} (0.386 sq mi or 247 acres) and river estuaries.

Mirabeau (French pronunciation: [miʁabo]; Occitan: Mirabèu) is a commune in the Alpes-de-Haute-Provence department in southeastern France.

== Geography ==
The Bléone forms the commune's southern border.

== Natural and technological risks ==
None of the department's 200 communes is in an area of zero seismic risk. The canton that Mirabeau belongs to, Digne-les-Bains-Ouest, is in zone 1b (weak seismicity), according to the deterministic classification of 1991, based on historical earthquakes, and in zone 4 (medium risk) according to the probabilistic classification EC8 of 2011. The commune of Mirabeau is exposed to three other natural hazards:

- forest fire
- flood (in the valleys of Les Duyes and La Bléone)
- ground movement: the commune is very concerned with this medium-to-high risk.

In addition, the commune of Mirabeau is exposed to a risk arising from the transport of dangerous materials by rail, road and pipeline. The railway line from Saint-Auban to Digne across the commune is no longer in use. For roads, National Route 85 can be used for the transport of dangerous goods. And a pipeline supplying natural gas to Digne crosses the commune and thereby constitutes an additional risk factor.

The commune's management plan for foreseeable natural hazards (PPR in French) was approved in 2008 for the risk of ground movement; there is no DICRIM (Dossier d’information communal sur les risques majeurs; that is, dossier of information for the commune on major risks).

The commune has seen several declarations of natural disaster: for an earthquake in 1984, flooding and mudslides in 1996 and 2001, droughts in 1989, 1990 and 1998, and for landslides in 1996. The only earthquake strongly felt in the commune occurred on 19 June 1984. Its intensity in Mirabeau was V on the Medvedev–Sponheuer–Karnik scale (MSK), i.e. sleeping people wake up, objects fall. The epicentre of this earthquake was at Aiglun.

== Population ==
Historical population
Year	Pop.	±% p.a.
1968	142	—
1975	200	+5.01%
1982	262	+3.93%
1990	323	+2.65%
1999	394	+2.23%
2007	445	+1.53%
2012	500	+2.36%
2017	511	+0.44%
2023	522	+0.36%
Source: INSEE

== See also ==
- Communes of the Alpes-de-Haute-Provence department
