= Jean Hesnault =

Jean Hesnault (or Hénaut, Dehénault, d'Hénault, de Hénault), 1611–1682, was a French poet, libertine in morals and thought, friend of Molière and Chapelle.

In addition to his original production, he translated Latin poems with a materialist tendency (beginning of De natura rerum by Lucretius, chorus of the second act of the Troade by Seneca... ).

== Editions ==
- Œuvres diverses..., Paris, 1670.
- Dialogues ou Entretiens..., Rouen, 1709. (Same content as the previous edition.)
- Pieces published in various collections.
- Œuvres, ed. by Fr. Lachèvre, Paris, Champion, 1922.
- Some poems of Hénault can be found in Alain Niderst, La poésie à l'âge baroque, Paris, Laffont, coll. Bouquins, 2005, pp. 767–774.
