= Mallemoisson =

- Commune
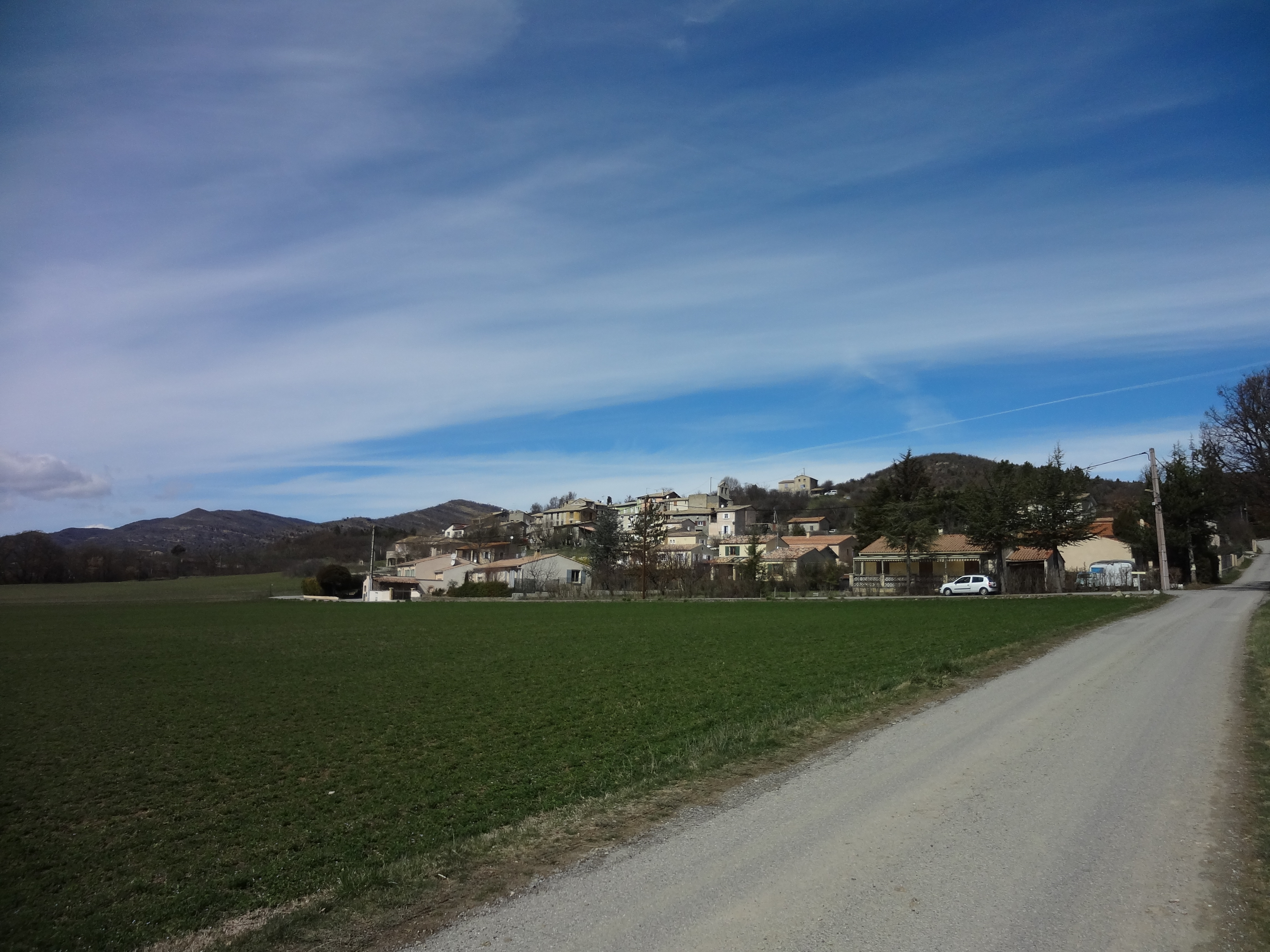
- A general view of the village of Mallemoisson

- Coat of arms
- Location of Mallemoisson
- Location within France Location within Provence-Alpes-Côte d'Azur
- Coordinates: 44°02′34″N 6°07′33″E
- Country: France
- Region: Provence-Alpes-Côte d'Azur
- Department: Alpes-de-Haute-Provence
- Arrondissement: Digne-les-Bains
- Canton: Digne-les-Bains-2
- Intercommunality: CA Provence-Alpes

Government
  - Mayor (2026–32): Henri Couve
- Area^{1}: 6.04 km^{2} (2.33 sq mi)
- Elevation: 505 m (1,657 ft)
- Highest elevation: 663 m (2,175 ft)
- Lowest elevation: 476 m (1,562 ft)
- Population (2023): 957
  - Density: 158/km^{2} (410/sq mi)
- Time zone: UTC+01:00 (CET)
  - Summer (DST): UTC+02:00 (CEST)
- INSEE/Postal code: 04110 /04510
- ^{1} French Land Register data, which excludes lakes, ponds, glaciers > 1 km^{2} (0.386 sq mi or 247 acres) and river estuaries.

Mallemoisson (French pronunciation: [malmwasɔ̃]; Occitan: Malameisson) is a commune in the Alpes-de-Haute-Provence department in southeastern France.

== Geography ==
The Bléone forms the commune's southern border.

== Population ==
Historical population
| Year | Pop. | ±% p.a. |
|---|---|---|
| 1968 | 355 | — |
| 1975 | 415 | +2.26% |
| 1982 | 612 | +5.71% |
| 1990 | 783 | +3.13% |
| 1999 | 994 | +2.69% |
| 2007 | 1,051 | +0.70% |
| 2012 | 998 | −1.03% |
| 2017 | 1,046 | +0.94% |
| 2023 | 957 | −1.47% |
Source: INSEE

== See also ==
- Communes of the Alpes-de-Haute-Provence department
