= Givet =

Givet Djivet (Walloon)
- Commune
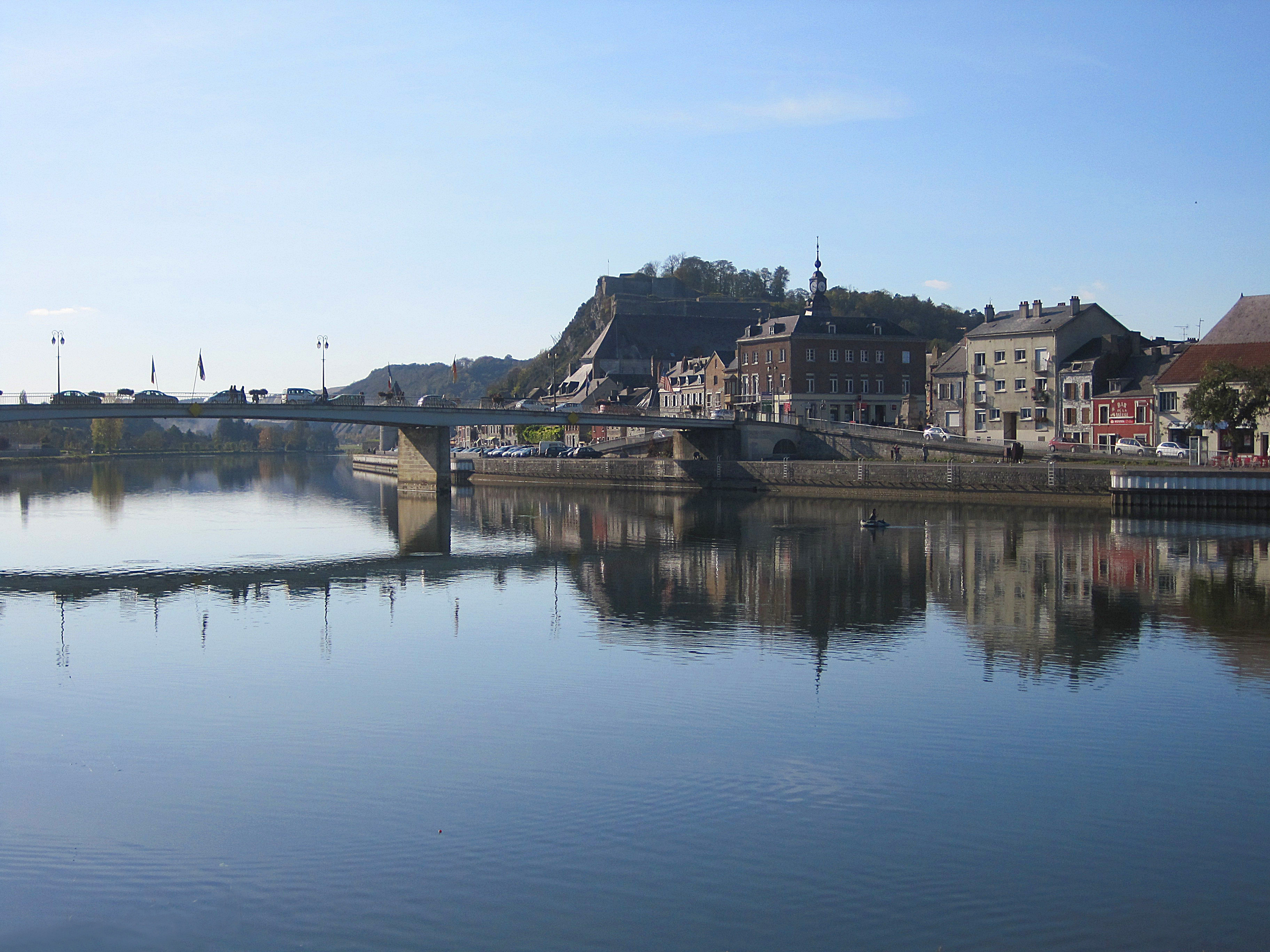
- The river Meuse, the American Bridge, the Quai des Remparts, the Saint-Hilaire quarter and the Charlemont fort

- Coat of arms
- Location of Givet
- Location within France Location within Grand Est
- Coordinates: 50°08′20″N 4°49′30″E
- Country: France
- Region: Grand Est
- Department: Ardennes
- Arrondissement: Charleville-Mézières
- Canton: Givet
- Intercommunality: Ardenne Rives de Meuse

Government
  - Mayor (2020–2026): Robert Itucci
- Area^{1}: 18.41 km^{2} (7.11 sq mi)
- Elevation: 124 m (407 ft)
- Highest elevation: 124 m (407 ft)
- Lowest elevation: 103 m (338 ft)
- Population (2023): 6,364
  - Density: 345.7/km^{2} (895.3/sq mi)
- Time zone: UTC+01:00 (CET)
  - Summer (DST): UTC+02:00 (CEST)
- INSEE/Postal code: 08190 /08600
- Website: givet.fr
- ^{1} French Land Register data, which excludes lakes, ponds, glaciers > 1 km^{2} (0.386 sq mi or 247 acres) and river estuaries.

Givet (French pronunciation: [ʒi.vɛ]) (German: Gibet; Walloon: Djivet) is a commune in the Ardennes department in northern France surrounded on three sides by the Belgian border. It lies on the river Meuse where Emperor Charles V built the fortress of Charlemont. It borders the French municipalities of Fromelennes to the east and Rancennes to the south and Foisches to the southeast.

The Pointe de Givet National Nature Reserve is partly located on the commune.

== History ==
The town's history claims that Saint Hubert lived there in 720 and performed a miracle. The town has changed hands several times since the Roman era before becoming part of France in 1678, and was later invaded by Russians and Germans.

During the Nine Years' War in 1696 Givet functioned as a supply depot for the French army and was bombarded by and Anglo-Dutch force under Menno van Coehoorn.

During the Napoleonic Wars, the French maintained a camp here for British naval prisoners of war from 1804 to 1814. One of the officer prisoners, Captain Jahleel Brenton, Royal Navy, who had been captured when his ship, H.M. frigate Minerve, ran aground off Cherbourg, and Naval Chaplain the Reverend Robert B. Wolfe, also a prisoner, established a school of navigation for the imprisoned British sailors. This was a successful unofficial initiative for teaching navigation that also provided a center for the growth of religious piety in the Royal Navy. An example of student work in the navigation school is preserved in the notebook by British seaman William Carter. British seaman, John Wetherell, a survivor of the British 38-gun frigate HMS Hussar that had wrecked near Brest and was burnt by her crew to prevent her capture, was imprisoned at Givet from 1804 to 1814 and left an account of his experiences.

In World War II, Givet was occupied by the Germans on May 12, 1940 and liberated by the allies on September 7, 1944. By December 1944, 11,000 American soldiers were billeted in the ancient Charlemont fortress. The German Ardennes Offensive targeted Givet and its crossing of the Meuse. The British, under General Montgomery, organized a last-ditch defense, and on 24 December, the German drive was stopped about 10 kilometres (6 mi) from Givet.

Givet is also the birthplace of writer Henry Bidou (1873 – 1943), pianist Jeanne-Marie Darré (1905-1999) and oboist Gilles Silvestrini (born 1961).

== Population ==
Historical population

Year	Pop.	±% p.a.
1793	4,100	—
1800	3,643	−1.67%
1806	3,879	+1.05%
1821	4,068	+0.32%
1831	4,220	+0.37%
1836	4,293	+0.34%
1841	5,689	+5.79%
1846	5,855	+0.58%
1851	5,639	−0.75%
1866	5,801	+0.19%
1872	5,104	−2.11%
1876	5,575	+2.23%
1881	6,972	+4.57%
1886	7,820	+2.32%
1891	7,083	−1.96%
1896	7,100	+0.05%
1901	6,947	−0.43%
1906	7,468	+1.46%

Year	Pop.	±% p.a.
1911	7,759	+0.77%
1921	5,519	−3.35%
1926	6,803	+4.27%
1931	6,826	+0.07%
1936	6,923	+0.28%
1946	5,524	−2.23%
1954	6,656	+2.36%
1962	7,444	+1.41%
1968	7,865	+0.92%
1975	7,804	−0.11%
1982	7,587	−0.40%
1990	7,775	+0.31%
1999	7,372	−0.59%
2007	6,777	−1.05%
2012	6,574	−0.61%
2017	6,749	+0.53%
2023	6,364	−0.97%

Source: EHESS and INSEE (1968-2023)

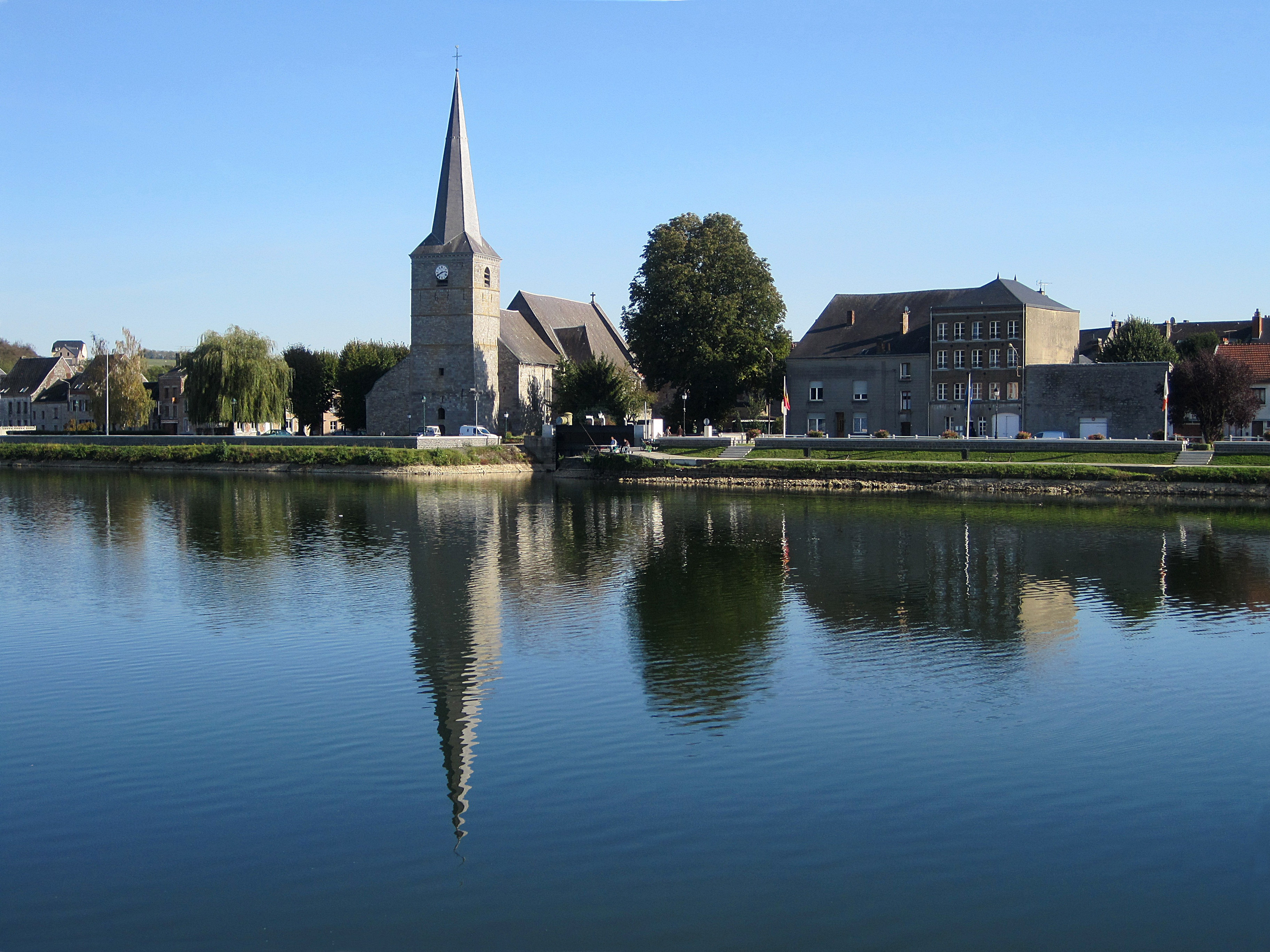
Notre-Dame church

== Transport ==
SNCF's TER Grand Est trains run at about hourly intervals from Givet station to Charleville-Mézières, taking about an hour for the 64 km (40 mi) route. Compagnie des chemins de fer des Ardennes opened the station in 1862.

TEC bus 154A runs every hour or two from the station to Dinant, taking about 42 minutes. It replaces railway line 154A, which took about 30 minutes for the 22 km (14 mi) route and closed in 1988. In 2021 a study began into reopening a single track, with a cycleway alongside.

The former Line 138A to Florennes and Châtelet has been converted to a RAVeL cycleway.

The River Meuse is navigable from the North Sea to Givet. The Canal de la Meuse links to the rest of the French canal network. The port declined after the canal was enlarged to allow 1,350 ton barges in the 1960s, but, when it was reconnected to the railway in 2013, it was still handling about 760,000 tonnes of freight a year.

Givet is served by several main roads, including D8051 to Rocroi, formerly N51, and D949, which is the French section of Belgium's N40, linking Arlon and Mons.

== In literature ==
Georges Simenon set his Maigret novel The Flemish House in Givet. Published first in 1932, it evokes the nature of the town at that time.

== See also ==
- Communes of the Ardennes department
- Étienne Méhul
- Aimée Lallement
