= Silvestrini =

Silvestrini is an Italian surname that may refer to

- Achille Silvestrini (1923–2019), Vatican diplomat, cardinal
- Gianni Silvestrini, Italian energy technology scientist
- Gilles Silvestrini (born 1961), French composer of contemporary music and oboist
- Nancy Noemí Silvestrini (1972–2003), Argentine mountaineer
