= Pointe de Givet National Nature Reserve =

National nature reserve in Grand Est, France

- IUCN category III (natural monument or feature)
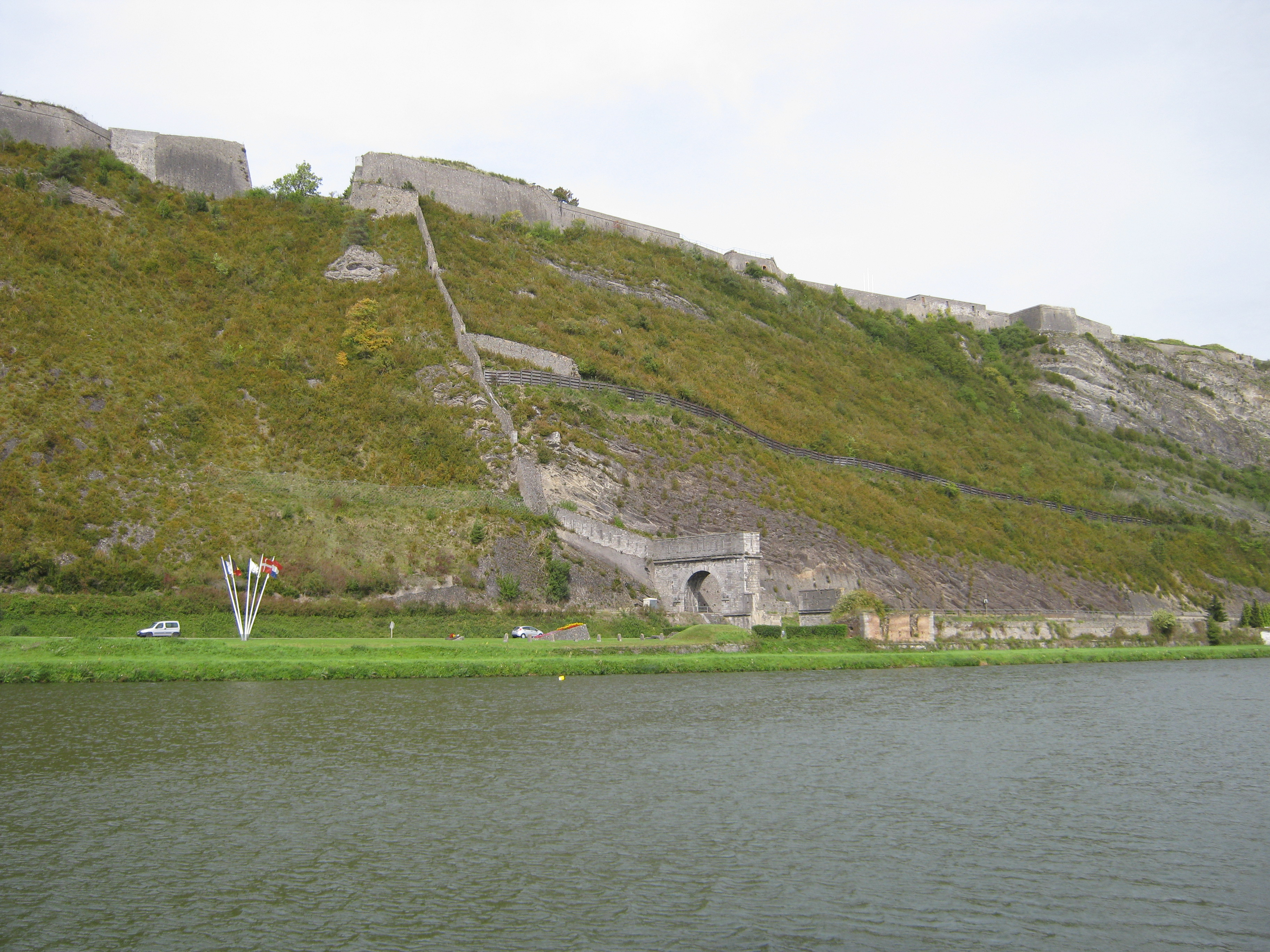
- Fort de Charlemont et Porte de France
- Interactive map of Pointe de Givet National Nature Reserve
- Location: Ardennes, France
- Nearest city: Givet
- Coordinates: 50°06′46″N 4°48′18″E
- Area: 354 ha (870 acres)
- Established: March 4, 1999
- Governing body: Conservatoire d'espaces naturels de Champagne-Ardennes; ONF Ardenne

The Pointe de Givet National Nature Reserve (RNN145) is a national nature reserve of the Grand Est region of France. Established in 1999, it spreads over 354 hectares and protects a group of sites recognised for their rich geology, flora and fauna.

== Localisation ==
At the northern end of the Ardennes department, the nature reserve territory consists of 11 entities localized on the communes of Charnois, Chooz, Foisches, Fromelennes, Givet, and Rancennes for a total area of 354 hectares.

== History of site and reserve ==
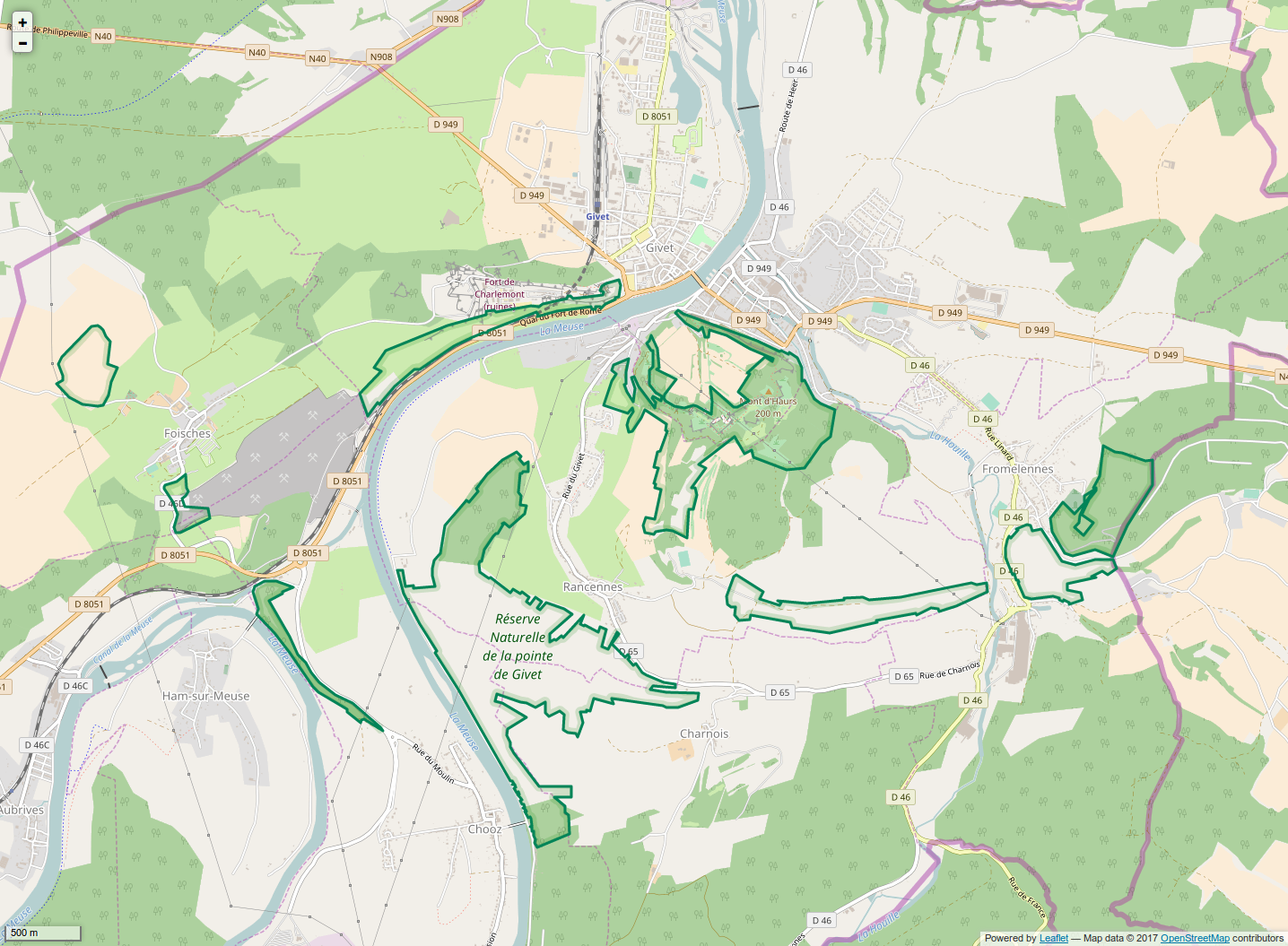
Perimeter of the Pointe de Givet National Nature Reserve

The sector has been known by naturalists since at least the 19th century for its geological riches and flora. To protect this deteriorating heritage, "La Valenne" association solicited the classification as national nature reserve of the most notable natural environments of the site known as Pointe de Givet in 1990. The classification procedure succeeded in 1999, and governing bodies (National Forests Office and Conservatory of Natural Areas of Champagne-Ardennes (Conservatoire d'espaces naturels de Champagne-Ardennes)) have been designed in 2000.

== Ecology ==
The nature reserve offers a landscape composed of forests, moors, dry lawns as well as spectacular rocky escarpments. Its interest is geological, floral and faunal. Five main natural habitat types can be found:

- "mineral" substrates (flush rocks, steep cliff, scree, cave entrances)
- habitats with short herbaceous vegetation (dry grassland, moors)
- areas of shrub vegetation (thickets)
- afforestation (woods, forests, edges)
- semi-natural anthropogenic habitats (game culture, hedges, slopes)

== Geology ==
Givet Pointe's geology presents several unusual aspects. Of educational interest, they justify national nature reserve classification. The Meuse valley deeply cuts into limestone and it is here that Jules Gosselet defined the Givétien stratotype in 1879. But rocks diversity is broad; in addition to a limestone known as Givet blue stone, there are shales, sandstones, an old fluorite quarry and many fossils, notably trilobites. Some limestone caves complete the inventory with their stalactites and stalagmites.

== Flora ==
The geographical location of Givet Pointe, with the spectacular relief of certain sites, and the existence of hot and dry micro-climates, have allowed the development of a southern flora which is exceptional at this latitude. The nature reserve flora inventory reports 461 species, including 156 remarkable ("rare" or "very rare") among which 11 are protected in Champagne-Ardenne. The Regional Red List has 35 registered species such as white mugwort (Artemisia alba), the wild cotoneaster, cat's-foot, monkey orchid and bloody geranium.

== Fauna ==
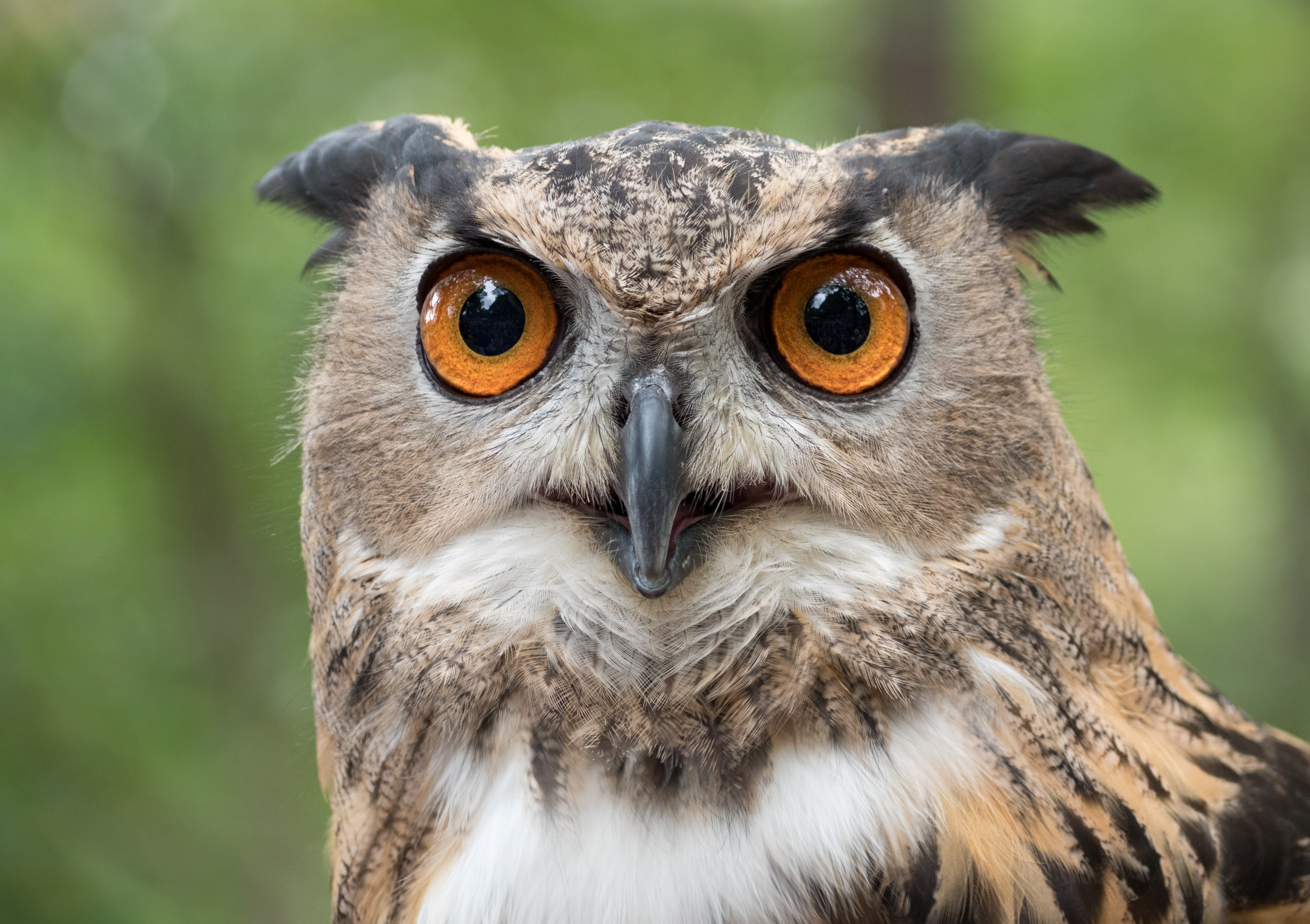
A Eurasian eagle-owl

The variety of natural environments provides habitats for more than 320 animal species, including insects, bats and birds.

Twenty mammal species have been identified. The richness in insects and existence of caves explain the presence of 12 species of bats, some of which fall under the Habitats Directive (92/43/EEC): lesser horseshoe bat, greater horseshoe bat, greater mouse-eared bat and Geoffroy's bat.

Over 70 species of birds have been identified, a third of which are registered on the Regional Red List, such as the Eurasian eagle-owl, European nightjar and woodlark.

Reptiles like the common European adder and the smooth snake are fond of rocky areas.

As of 2020, 171 insect species have thus far been identified, including 78 Lepidoptera Papilionoidea such as Erebia medusa, the silver-studded blue, large copper and the marsh fritillary. There are also around 30 species of Orthoptera such as the blue-winged grasshopper, the grey bush cricket, the Tetrix bipunctata and the wart-biter.

=== State, pressures or threats, responses ===
The nature reserve splitting into 11 entities leads to significant ecological fragmentation. Numerous after-effects of war dot the territory. In the absence of large wild herbivorous mammals, there is a tendency for open areas to become overgrown.

== Tourism and educational interest ==
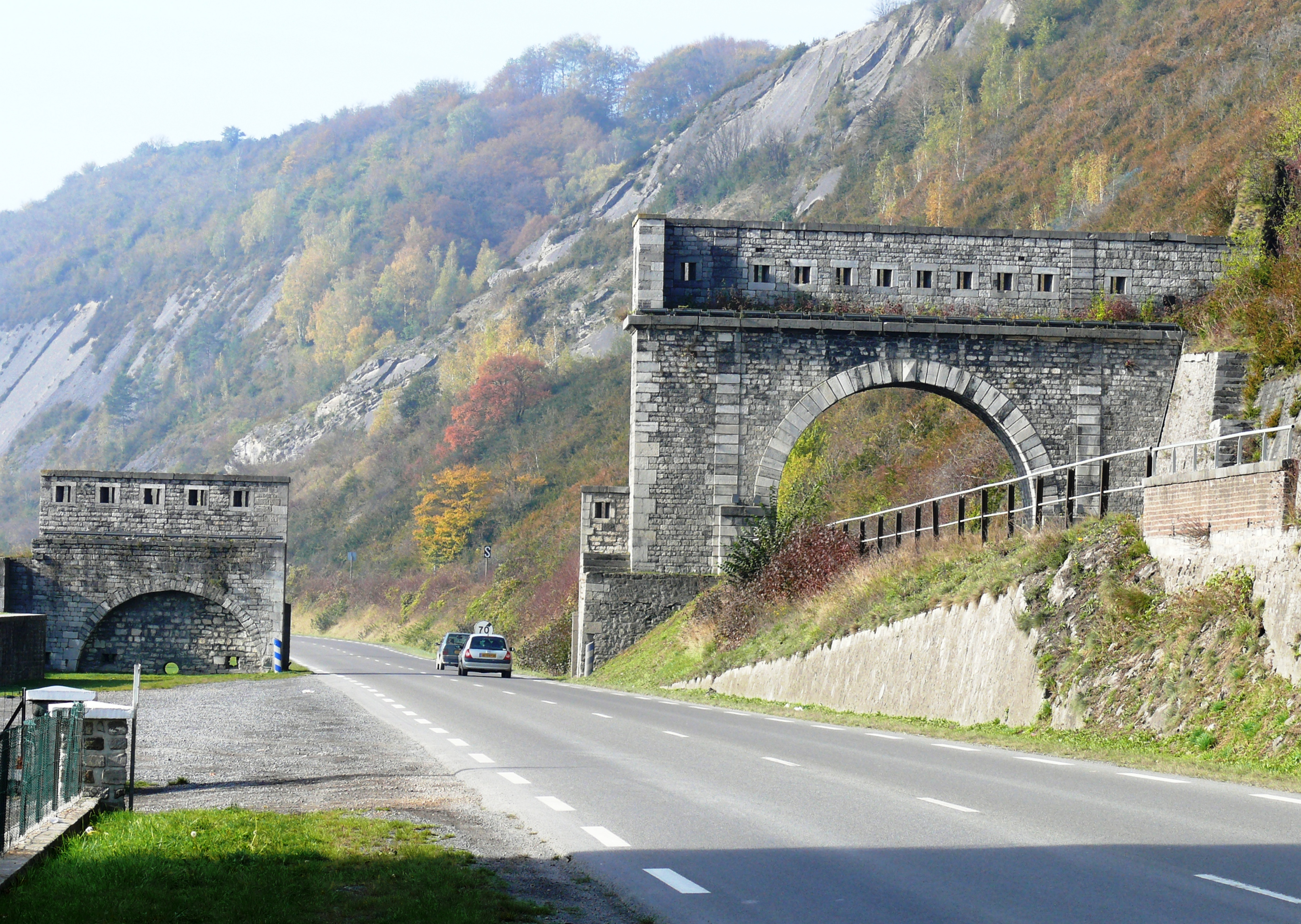
France's Gate at Givet

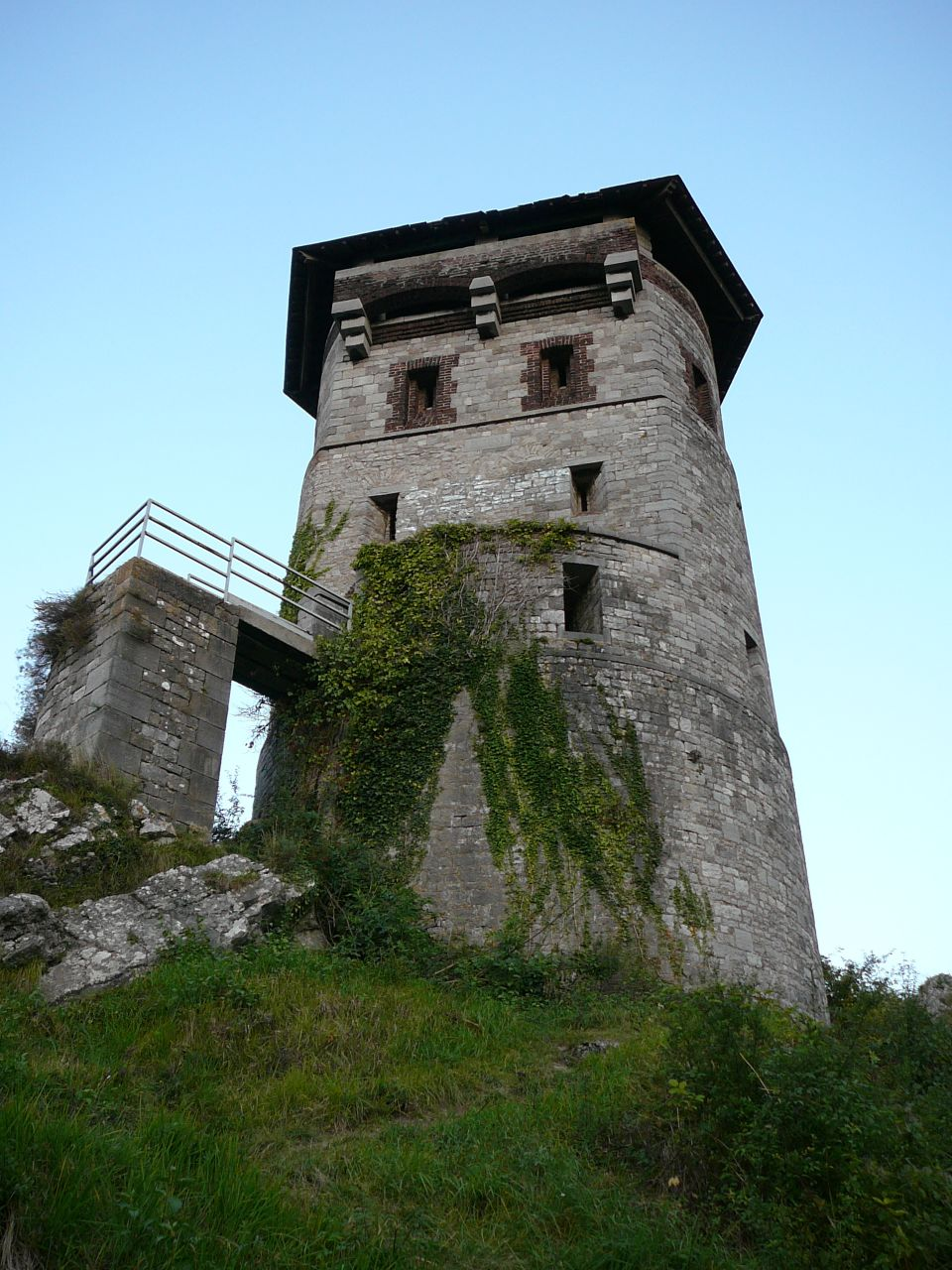
Former watchtower, known as "Grégoire tower" located on the edge of the abrupt of the Mount d'Haurs, above the Meuse valley. It would have been erected in the 11th century, but has undergone multiple transformations. The visitor can discover from there a large part of the panorama of the Meuse valley

It is linked to natural habitats, landscapes (steep gradients) and biodiversity they shelter, but also to geological riches of the site and its cultural aspects. Givet Point is an old traffic area of strategic interest that has left its mark:

- Fortress of Charlemont (Fort de Charlemont) (9th Zouaves commando training centre from 1962 to 2009);
- France's Gate (Porte de France) (fortification formerly protecting access to Givet);
- Grégoire tower (Tour Grégoire) (dating from the 11th century, which controlled the road and river routes);
- Haurs Mount Fortress (Fort du Mont d'Haurs) (designed by Vauban to support Fortress of Charlemont, but never completed).

The site has become a centre of environmental education, offering trails, guided tours and study facilities.

== Administration, management plan, regulations ==
The management is ensured by the Conservatory of Natural Spaces of Champagne-Ardenne (Conservatoire d'espaces naturels de Champagne-Ardenne) and the National Forests Office Ardennes (ONF Ardennes). The first management plan (2003-2007) enabled restoration work (reopening of dry lawns) thanks to brushcutting and mowing with export made by students, reintegration teams or "nature work camps". Goats have been used since 2005 to remove the bushes from part of the "Aviette Maurière ravines" by extensive grazing. An evaluation of the management plan was started in 2007. The second management plan 2008-2012 is completed.

=== Tools and legal status ===
The nature reserve was classified in application of the law of July 10, 1976, by a decree of March 4, 1999. Several protection perimeters overlap there: registered and classified sites, ZNIEFF types I and II, ZICO, ZSC and APPB.
