= Reduction of the French fortresses in 1815 =

Post-Waterloo sieges of Napoleonic loyalists

- Part of The Waterloo Campaign
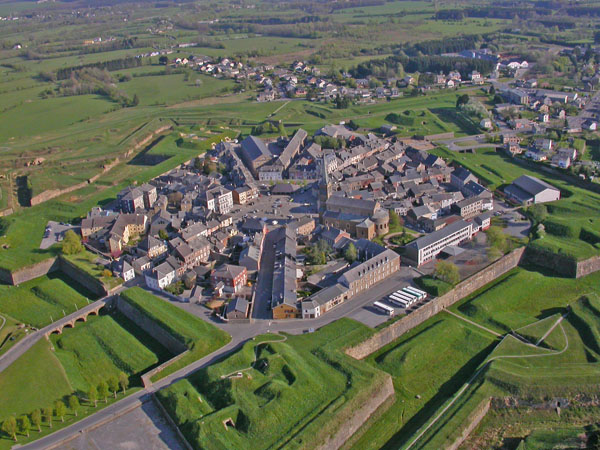
- Rocroi seen from the air shows its defensive structure.
| Location | France |
| Result | Capitulation of all the French fortresses held by governors sympathetic to the Bonapartist empire |

Belligerents
| France | Seventh Coalition |

After the defeat of Napoleon at the Battle of Waterloo and the advance on Paris by the Coalition armies during the months of June and July 1815, although they besieged and took some towns and fortresses as they advanced, they bypassed many of them and detached forces to observe and reduce them. The last of the French fortresses did not capitulate until September of that year.

== Northern fortresses ==
By 21 of June the armies of Prince Blücher and the Duke of Wellington had now reached the Triple Line of Fortresses, which, until the Campaign of 1814 proved the contrary, had been considered by so many military men as presenting an insurmountable barrier to the advance of hostile armies into France by its north-eastern frontier.

It was most essential that some of the principal fortresses should be secured; and made to constitute a new basis whence to direct the operations now contemplated against the interior. The following, which first presented themselves on the respective lines of advance of the two Commanders, were destined to be immediately blockaded: Valenciennes, Le Quesnoy, and Cambrai, by the Anglo-allied army; and Maubeuge, Landrecy, Avesnes-sur-Helpe (Avesnes), and Rocroi, by the Prussians. The general arrangements for the besieging of the fortresses, and the planning of the further operations, formed the subject of the conference at Catillon held on 23 June 1815.

Among other things it was agreed that in order to secure a good base from which to conduct the current advance it was necessary to capture some of these fortresses immediately, it was further arranged that the corps under Prince Frederick of the Netherlands should remain, for the purpose of besieging the fortresses situated on the Scheldt, and between that river and the Sambre: and that the Prussian II Corps commanded by General Pirch I; the North German Corps, commanded at first by General Friedrich Graf Kleist von Nollendorf, and subsequently by Lieutenant General Hake; as also a portion of the garrison troops of Luxemburg, commanded by Lieutenant General Prince Louis of Hesse-Homburg, — the whole of these German forces being placed under the chief command of Prince Augustus of Prussia — should undertake the besieging of the fortresses on the Sambre, and those between the Sambre and the Moselle.

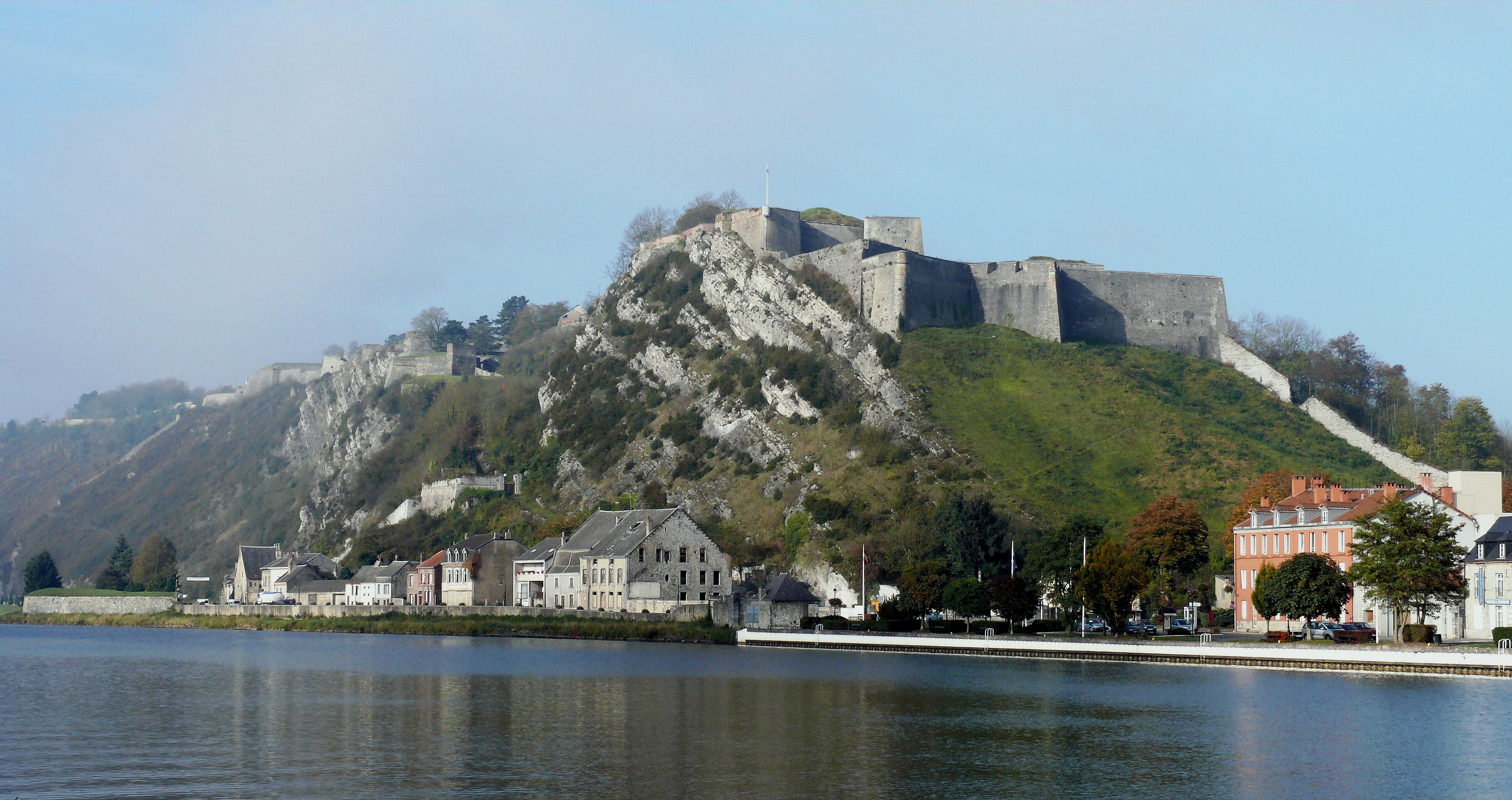
The Fortress of Charlemont and the village of Givet.

The reduction of the fortresses left in rear of the British and Prussian armies, adjoining their main line of operations, was handled by a Coalition force under the command of Prince Augustus of Prussia, with the Prussian II Corps, assisted by the British Battering Train, was effected in the following manner:

Siege
| Fortress | Commencement | Capitulation |
|---|---|---|
| Maubeuge | 8 July | 12 July |
| Landrecies | 19 July | 21 July |
| Mariembourg | 27 July | 28 July |
| Philippeville | 7 August | 8 August |
| Rocroy | 15 August | 16 August |

Prince Augustus had made every preparation for commencing the siege of Charlemont and its connecting forts (Givet and the Mont d'Hours), on 8 September, when the Commandant, General Burke, foreseeing that the occupation of the detached forts would divide his force too much, entered into negotiations, and surrendered those works on 10 September, withdrawing his troops into Charlemont; the bombardment of which was to have opened on 23 September: but, on 20 September, Prince Augustus received information from Paris that hostilities were to cease throughout the whole of France.

== Eastern fortresses ==
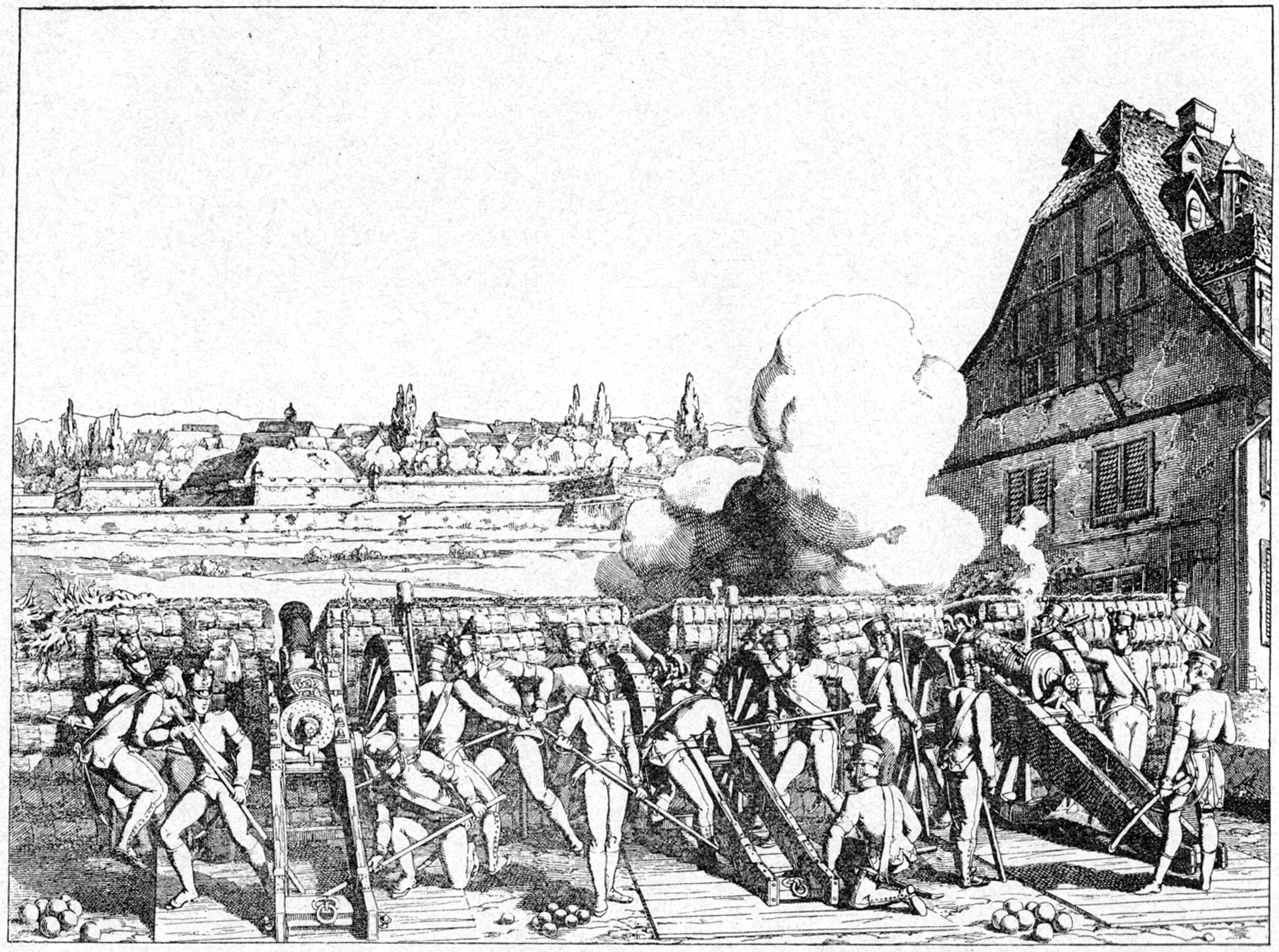
A Swiss battery in action during the siege of Huningue (26 June – 26 August 1815).

As with the advance of the armies commanded by Wellington and Blücher, the Austrian-allied Army of the Upper Rhine, also bypassed fortresses and fortified towns as they entered France. For example, with the news of the capture of Paris by the British and Prussian troops and the suspension of hostilities; which was concluded on 24 July, included the fortress of Strasbourg, Landau, La Petite-Pierre, Sélestat, Lichtenberg, Phalsbourg, Neuf-Brisach and Belfort.

One notable exception was Huningue and its governor General Barbanègre who commanded a garrison of only 500 men against 25,000 Austrians. On the 28 June shortly after word of Napoleon's abdication became known, and the French Provisional Government had requested a ceasefire, Barbanègre ordered the bombardment of neighboring Swiss Basel, something that contemporaries on the Seventh Coalition side considered to be a war crime. At its surrender to the Austrians on 26 August 1815, the city was a ruin and the fortifications were demolished under the terms of Article III of the Treaty of Paris (1815) at the request of Basel.

== Aftermath ==
Under the terms of Article V the Treaty of Paris signed on 20 November 1815, it was agreed that parts of France would be occupied for up to five years by Coalition forces, paid for by the French exchequer. Under Article IV Convention on the Military Lines (signed at the same time as the peace treaty) this included 26 fortified places including fortresses and fortified towns (for a list see Convention on the Military Line (1815)). The occupation army was about 150,000 strong and was commanded by the Duke of Wellington. In the end the occupation lasted three years and Coalition forces pulled out in 1818.
