= Aimée Lallement =

French activist, athlete

Aimée-Marie Éléonore Lallement
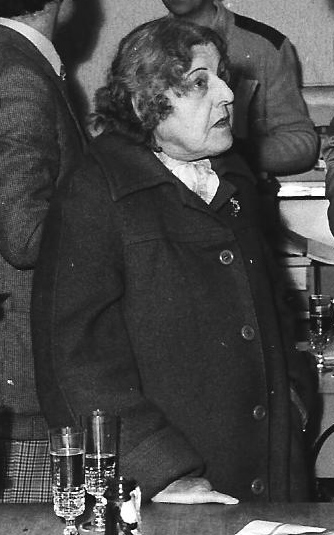
- In 1980 at a reunion.
- Born: 16 August 1898; Givet, France
- Died: 11 September 1988 (aged 90); Reims, France
- Occupations: Teacher; Director of a young girls association Activist SFIO President : la Ligue des droits de l'Homme; Comité départemental de l'action laïque; Aides ménagères rémoises; Creator: Association familiale laïque; des JO féminins de 1924; Secretary of Libre Pensée; Righteous Among the Nations

Marie-Aimée Éléonore Lallement (16 August 1898 – 11 September 1988) was a French community activist, socialist and feminist who was a world champion sportswoman in the 110 meter and the Javelin competitions. She was also a Righteous Among the Nations.

== Youth ==
Lallement was born at Givet on the 16 August 1898 to a family of teachers. World War I forced her family to leave Ardennes and as a refugee she continued her studies and became a teacher in Versailles. She campaigned for women's equality, based on the examples in Finland, Norway and Denmark, where women had obtained the vote in 1906. She was outraged that the Olympics did not welcome women and as the Games were to take place in Paris in 1924, she invited other women to organize a parallel Olympics events. She distinguished herself in at least two disciplines as World Champion of the 110 meter and the Javelin.

Lallemont was a member of the Socialist Party; she was part of a group of women that included Cécile Brunschvicg, Irène Joliot-Curie and Suzanne Lacore. The last three were chosen by Léon Blum and become ministers. Suzanne Lacore was the closest of her three friends.

== World War II ==
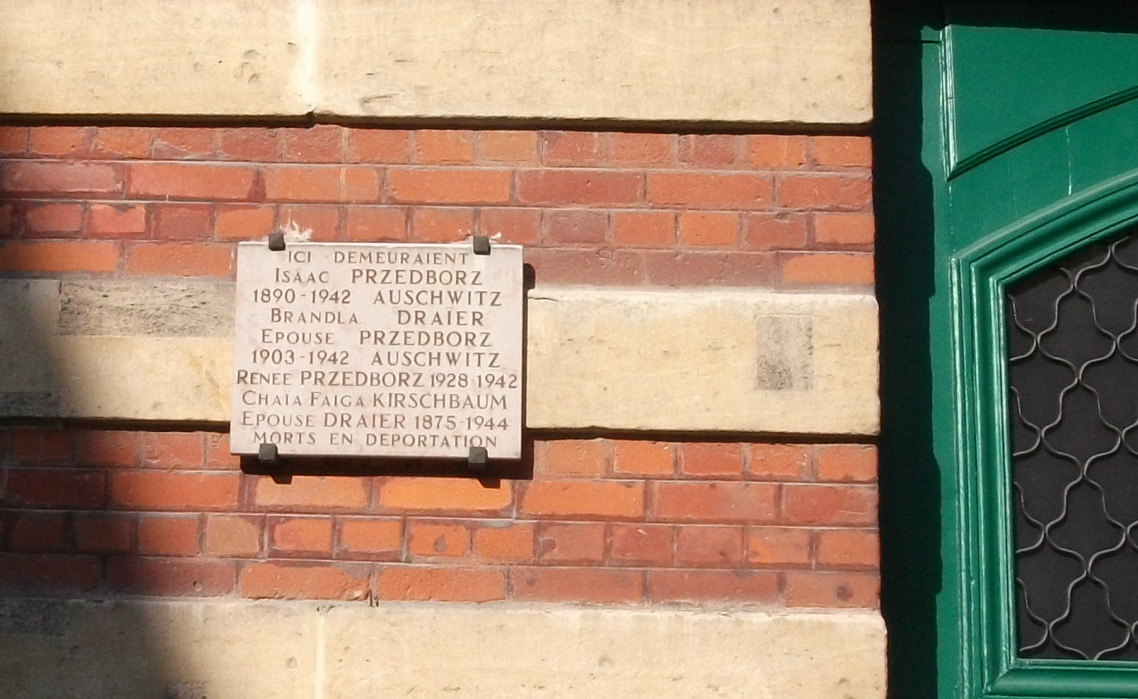
Memorial Plaque at 47 rue Tellier in Reims, France in tribute to the Przedborz family, deported and murdered in Auschwitz.

While she lived street on the road l'Ecu in Reims she was friends with the Przedborz family who lived at 47 rue des Telliers. The mother of the family, Brandla, born 20 February 1903 in Brawa, was arrested for being Jewish, held at Drancy and then deported by the convoy 11 of 27 July 1942 to Auschwitz. Her aunt Henriette Drajer, 52, born Cohen and her sister Renee, born 17 December 1928 in Metz, were arrested during an attempt to escape to the Zone Libre and interned in Drancy and deported on convoy 35 of 21 October 1942 to Auschwitz. Isaac the father, born 27 August 1890 in Lask, Poland, was arrested in his home for being Jewish, interned at Drancy and then deported by convoy 40 of 11 November 1942 to Auschwitz. None of this family returned. During the arrest of his father, Yankel fled through the roof because he was "determined not to let them take me alive" and took refuge at his friend Aimee's house. Aimee had expressed her willingness to help them after the first arrest, of their mother Brandla.

Aimee was then the director of a women's youth center, rue de Talleyrand, and she had the idea of getting Yankel to pass for a niece, called Jacqueline, and to let his hair grow. For safety sake she eventually took Yankel to her country house of Montchenot. There the young man of 17 years followed the course of the village teacher, a friend of Aimee, a socialist activist and a member of the Movement of Libération-Nord. Yankel hid until the liberation. Having no ration card, he survived from garden produce. and by sharing Aimée's ration card. The only survivor of the 19 members of his family, Aimee did Frenchify his name by the decree of 18 February 1950 to Jacques Presbor and then formally adopted him by the judgment of 19 October 1956. He then took the name of Presbor-Lallement. Having finished his studies, he became a doctor to Houillères de Lorraine in Falck, France.

The Ejnès brothers made representations to the rabbi Blum of Reims to present a dossier to make Aimme Righteous among the Nations. Aimee had helped other Jewish families during the war. She eventually planted tree 1760 in Yad Vashem in 1980, in a ceremony held in the privacy of this memorial.

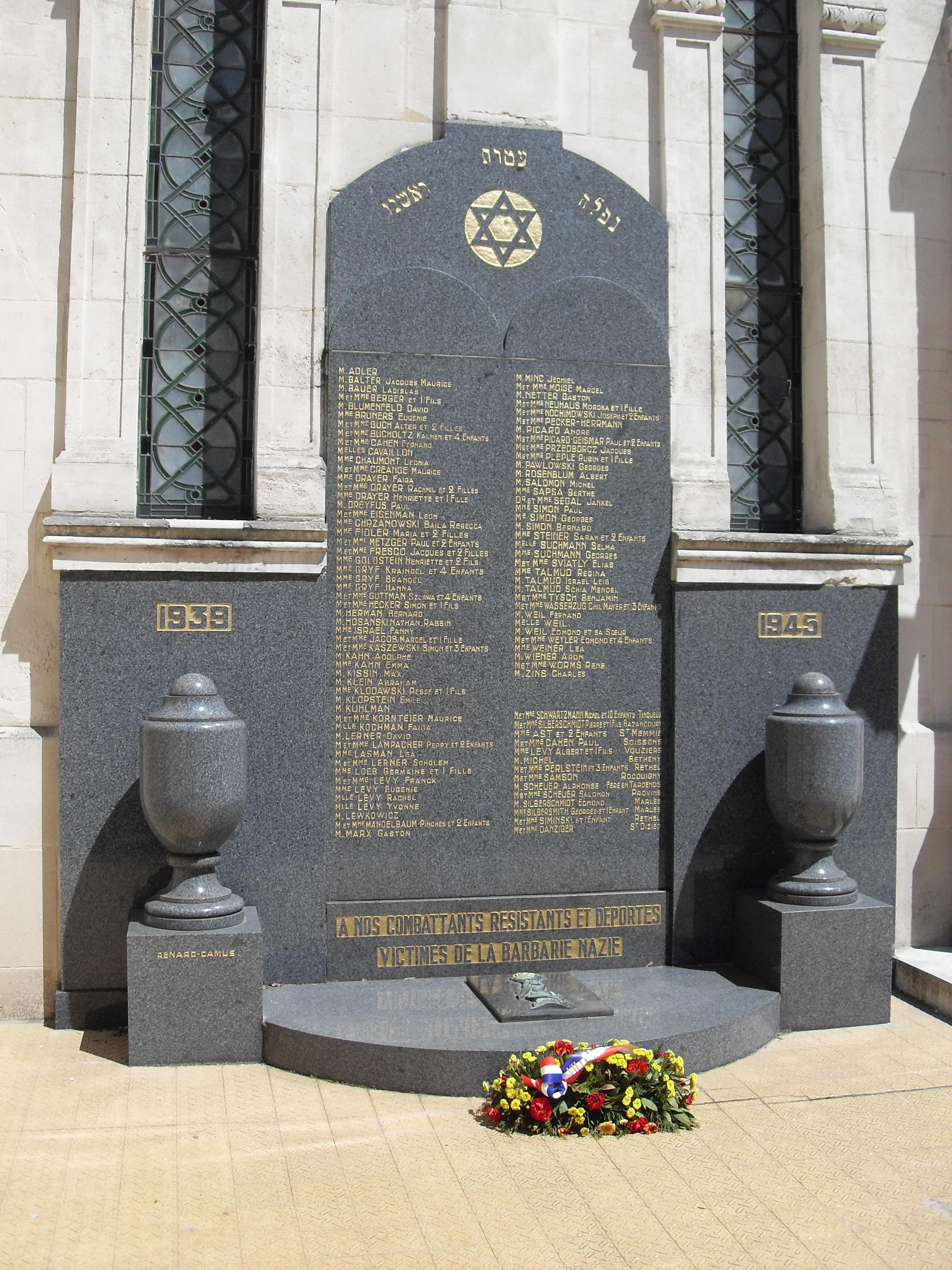
In front of the Reims Synagoguea plaque with the names of Przedborcs and Mrs. George Simon.

== Militant ==
She was an activist at both national and local levels. She was involved in the claim but also in embodiment, in thinking and in action. Thus she had responsibilities at the National Office of the Socialist Party, responsible for the Socialist Women, was a dignitary of the Droit Humain, a mixed Masonic lodge. She was also involved in Theosophical society of Annie Besant. All this activity to improve humanity and reflect on ways to achieve this.

She was, at the local level, much involved as president of Human rights, of the departmental Committee of Secular Action and of Rheims household aids. She created l'Association Familiale Laïque that she ran until her death, and she also ran the local chapter of the Libre-pensée. Her activism did not stop at these achievements, she ran with Gilles Quénard in 1971 at the municipal elections in a list that presaged the Union of the Left against the Minister Jean Taittinger.

All this activist and intellectual activity had not turned her away from regular exercise. By the end of her life she favored swimming. Resident of a home ARFO she died on 11 in Reims, where her ashes rest in Cimetière de l'Est.
