= Aubrives =

- Commune
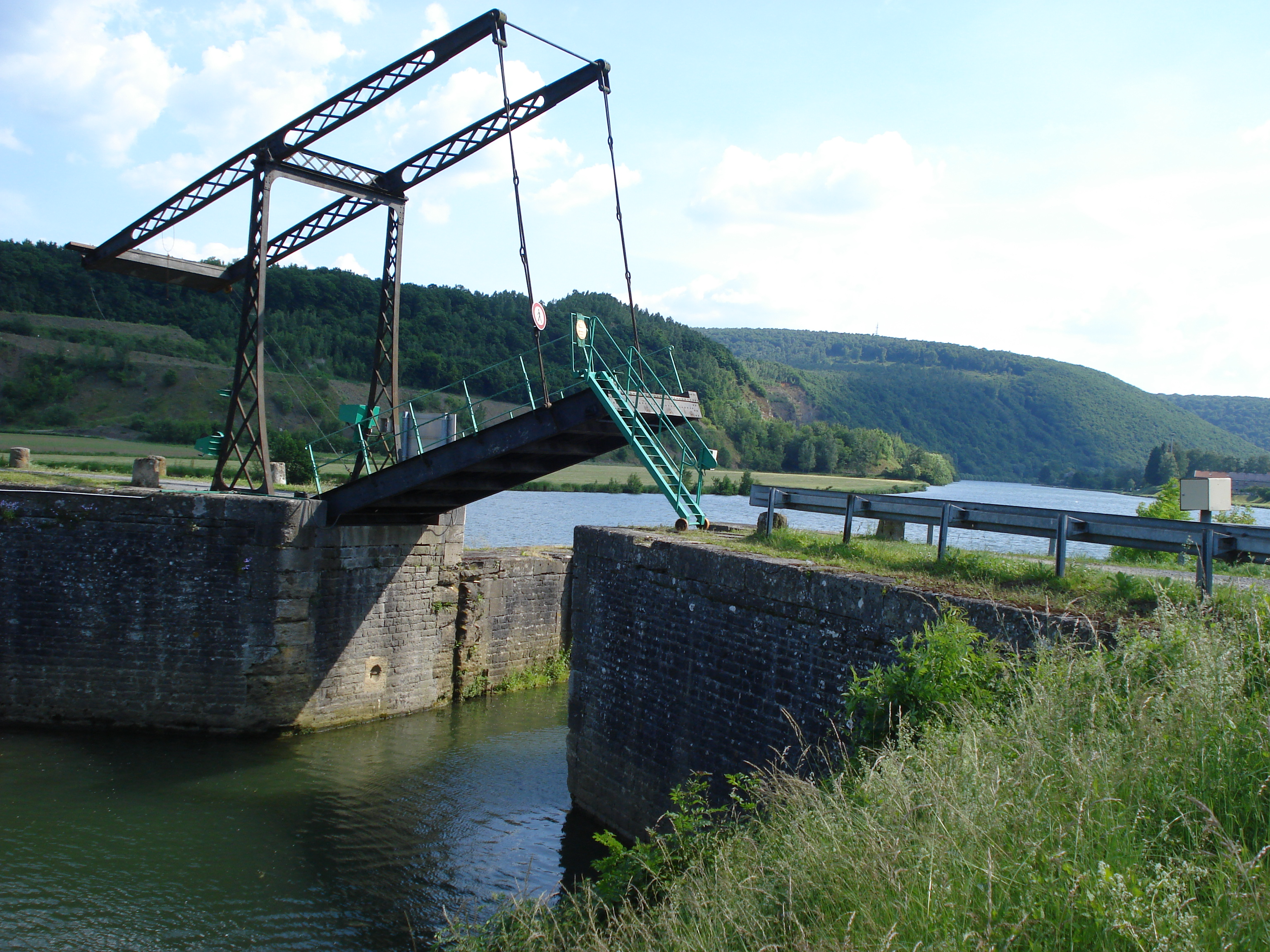
- The lifting bridge in Aubrives

- Coat of arms
- Location of Aubrives
- Location within France Location within Grand Est
- Coordinates: 50°06′15″N 4°45′46″E
- Country: France
- Region: Grand Est
- Department: Ardennes
- Arrondissement: Charleville-Mézières
- Canton: Givet
- Intercommunality: CC Ardenne Rives Meuse

Government
  - Mayor (2020–2026): Fabien Prignon
- Area^{1}: 10.73 km^{2} (4.14 sq mi)
- Elevation: 109 m (358 ft)
- Highest elevation: 355 m (1,165 ft)
- Lowest elevation: 104 m (341 ft)
- Population (2023): 951
  - Density: 88.6/km^{2} (230/sq mi)
- Time zone: UTC+01:00 (CET)
  - Summer (DST): UTC+02:00 (CEST)
- INSEE/Postal code: 08028 /08320
- ^{1} French Land Register data, which excludes lakes, ponds, glaciers > 1 km^{2} (0.386 sq mi or 247 acres) and river estuaries.

Aubrives (French pronunciation: [obʁiv]) is a commune in the Ardennes department in north-eastern France.

== Population ==
Historical population
Year	Pop.	±% p.a.
1968	1,021	—
1975	1,104	+1.12%
1982	1,022	−1.10%
1990	1,139	+1.36%
1999	1,026	−1.15%
2007	912	−1.46%
2012	862	−1.12%
2017	910	+1.09%
2023	951	+0.74%
Source: INSEE

== See also ==
- Communes of the Ardennes department
