= Landrichamps =

- Commune
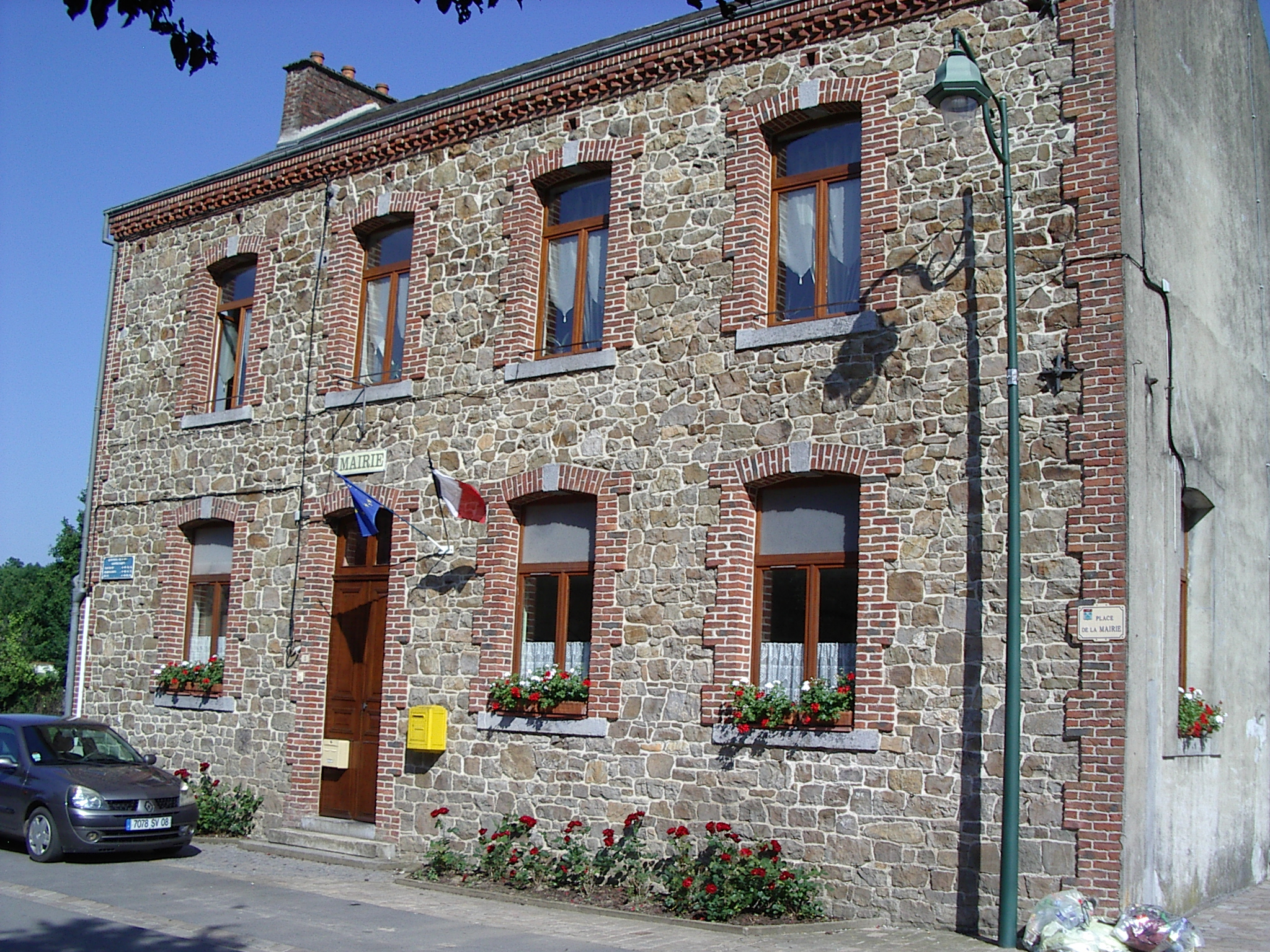
- The town hall in Landrichamps

- Coat of arms
- Location of Landrichamps
- Location within France Location within Grand Est
- Coordinates: 50°05′26″N 4°49′53″E
- Country: France
- Region: Grand Est
- Department: Ardennes
- Arrondissement: Charleville-Mézières
- Canton: Givet
- Intercommunality: Ardenne Rives de Meuse

Government
  - Mayor (2020–2026): Sébastien Paulet
- Area^{1}: 4.72 km^{2} (1.82 sq mi)
- Elevation: 157 m (515 ft)
- Highest elevation: 342 m (1,122 ft)
- Lowest elevation: 135 m (443 ft)
- Population (2023): 126
  - Density: 26.7/km^{2} (69.1/sq mi)
- Time zone: UTC+01:00 (CET)
  - Summer (DST): UTC+02:00 (CEST)
- INSEE/Postal code: 08247 /08600
- ^{1} French Land Register data, which excludes lakes, ponds, glaciers > 1 km^{2} (0.386 sq mi or 247 acres) and river estuaries.

Landrichamps (French pronunciation: [lɑ̃dʁiʃɑ̃]) is a commune in the Ardennes department in northern France.

== Population ==
Historical population
Year	Pop.	±% p.a.
1968	147	—
1975	127	−2.07%
1982	166	+3.90%
1990	139	−2.19%
1999	132	−0.57%
2007	142	+0.92%
2012	138	−0.57%
2017	131	−1.04%
2023	126	−0.65%
Source: INSEE

== See also ==
- Communes of the Ardennes department
