= Canton of Givet =

Coordinates: 50.14°N 4.82°E

- Canton
- Situation of the canton of Givet in the department of Ardennes
- Country: France
- Region: Grand Est
- Department: Ardennes
- No. of communes: {{{nbcomm}}}
- Population (2023): 14,004
- INSEE code: 0809

The canton of Givet is an administrative division of the Ardennes department, northern France. Its borders were not modified at the French canton reorganisation which came into effect in March 2015. Its seat is in Givet.

It consists of the following communes:

1. Aubrives
2. Charnois
3. Chooz
4. Foisches
5. Fromelennes
6. Givet
7. Ham-sur-Meuse
8. Hierges
9. Landrichamps
10. Rancennes
11. Vireux-Molhain
12. Vireux-Wallerand
