= Ham-sur-Meuse =

- Commune
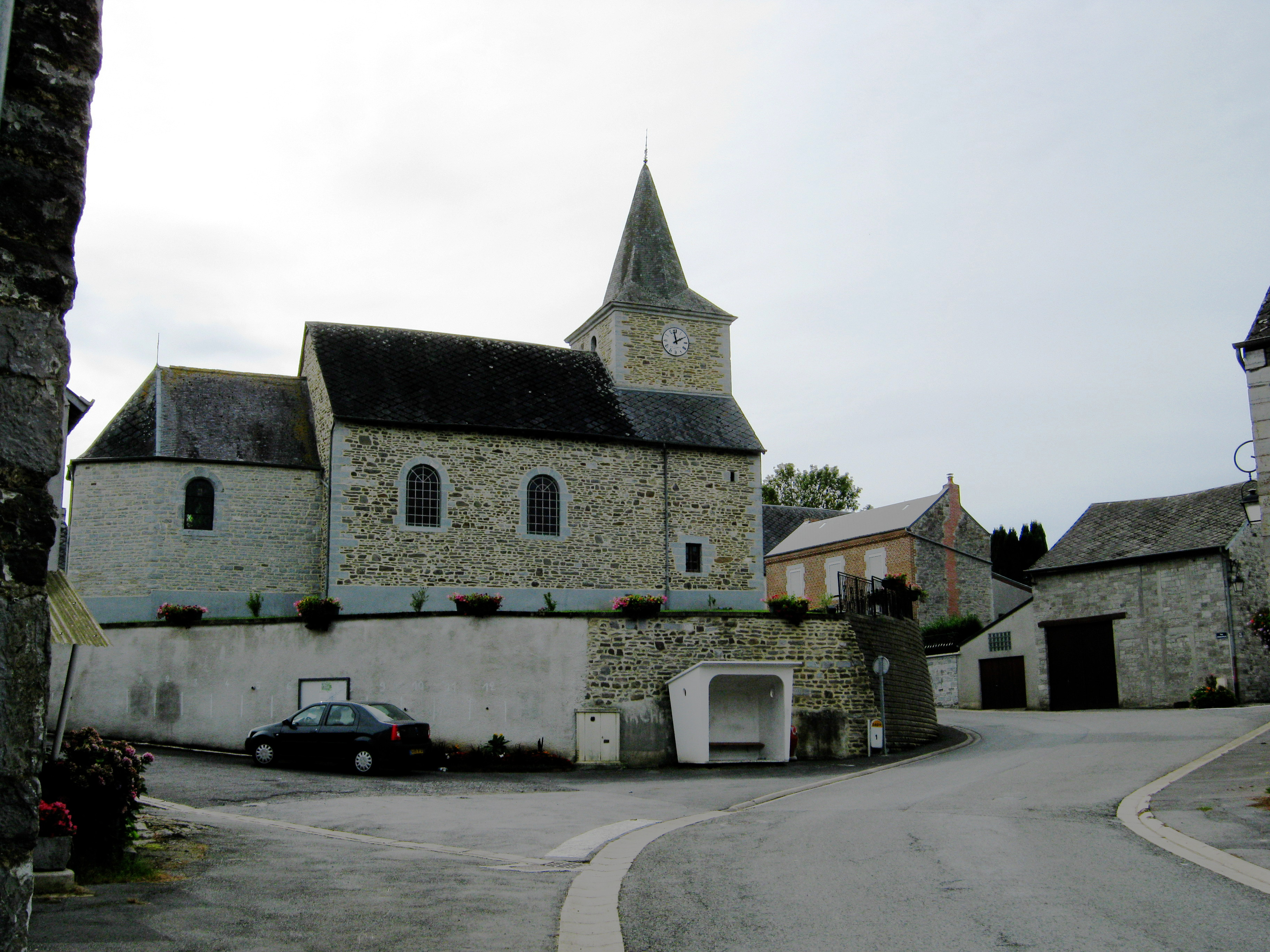
- The church in Ham-sur-Meuse

- Coat of arms
- Location of Ham-sur-Meuse
- Location within France Location within Grand Est
- Coordinates: 50°06′43″N 4°46′54″E
- Country: France
- Region: Grand Est
- Department: Ardennes
- Arrondissement: Charleville-Mézières
- Canton: Givet
- Intercommunality: Ardenne Rives de Meuse

Government
  - Mayor (2020–2026): Jean-Claude Jacquemart
- Area^{1}: 6.19 km^{2} (2.39 sq mi)
- Elevation: 110 m (360 ft)
- Highest elevation: 348 m (1,142 ft)
- Lowest elevation: 102 m (335 ft)
- Population (2023): 226
  - Density: 36.5/km^{2} (94.6/sq mi)
- Time zone: UTC+01:00 (CET)
  - Summer (DST): UTC+02:00 (CEST)
- INSEE/Postal code: 08207 /08600
- ^{1} French Land Register data, which excludes lakes, ponds, glaciers > 1 km^{2} (0.386 sq mi or 247 acres) and river estuaries.

Ham-sur-Meuse is a commune in the Ardennes department in northern France.

== Population ==
Historical population
Year	Pop.	±% p.a.
1968	193	—
1975	187	−0.45%
1982	202	+1.11%
1990	229	+1.58%
1999	246	+0.80%
2007	250	+0.20%
2012	246	−0.32%
2017	238	−0.66%
2023	226	−0.86%
Source: INSEE

== See also ==
- Communes of the Ardennes department
