= Charnois =

- Commune
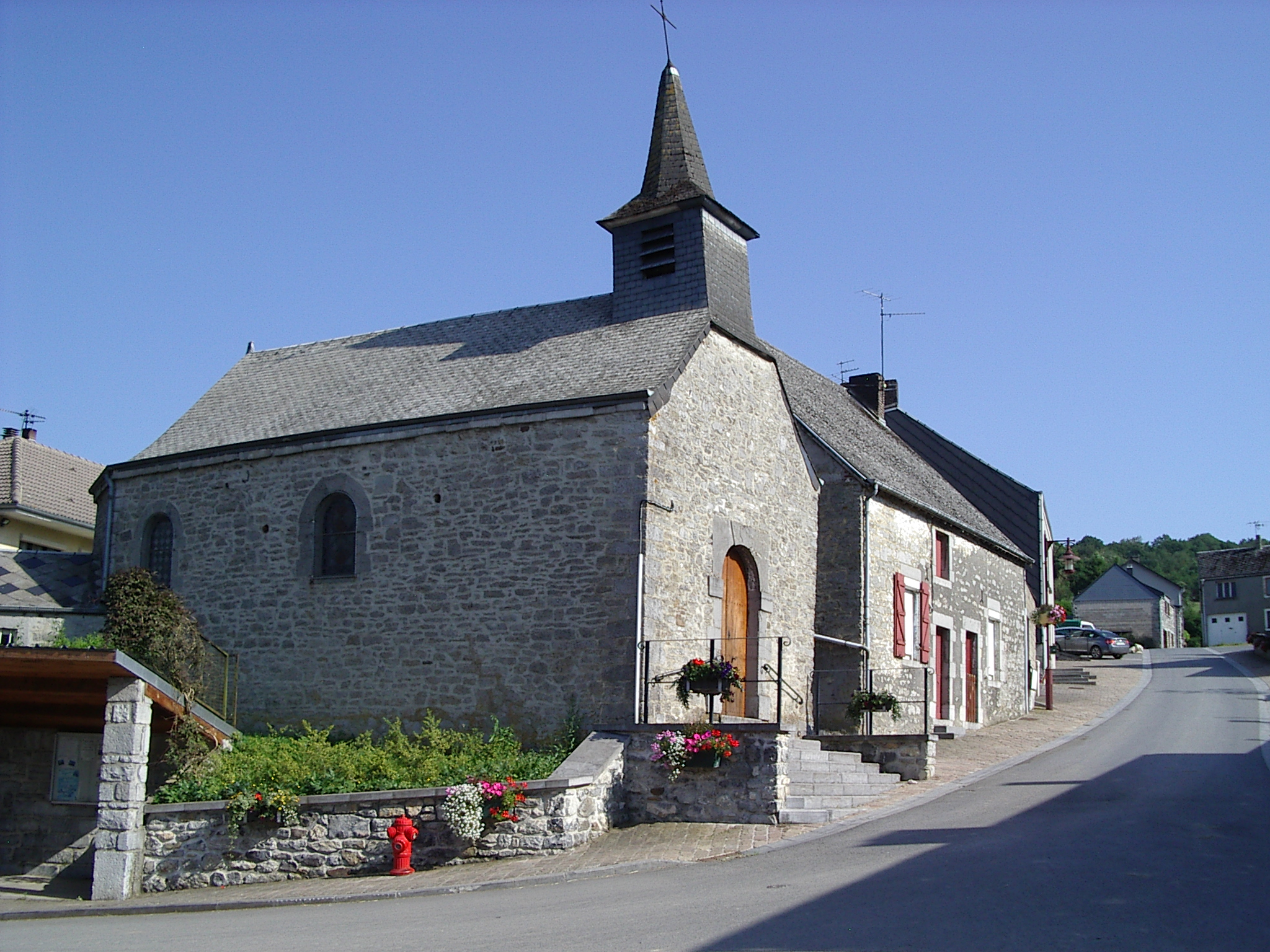
- The church in Charnois

- Coat of arms
- Location of Charnois
- Location within France Location within Grand Est
- Coordinates: 50°06′28″N 4°49′48″E
- Country: France
- Region: Grand Est
- Department: Ardennes
- Arrondissement: Charleville-Mézières
- Canton: Givet
- Intercommunality: Ardenne Rives de Meuse

Government
  - Mayor (2020–2026): Hervé Francotte
- Area^{1}: 5.61 km^{2} (2.17 sq mi)
- Elevation: 226 m (741 ft)
- Population (2023): 72
  - Density: 13/km^{2} (33/sq mi)
- Time zone: UTC+01:00 (CET)
  - Summer (DST): UTC+02:00 (CEST)
- INSEE/Postal code: 08106 /08600
- ^{1} French Land Register data, which excludes lakes, ponds, glaciers > 1 km^{2} (0.386 sq mi or 247 acres) and river estuaries.

Charnois (French pronunciation: [ʃaʁnwa]) is a commune in the Ardennes department in northern France.

The Pointe de Givet National Nature Reserve is partly located on the commune.

== Population ==
Historical population
Year	Pop.	±% p.a.
1968	76	—
1975	77	+0.19%
1982	79	+0.37%
1990	98	+2.73%
1999	89	−1.06%
2007	80	−1.32%
2012	87	+1.69%
2017	77	−2.41%
2023	72	−1.11%
Source: INSEE

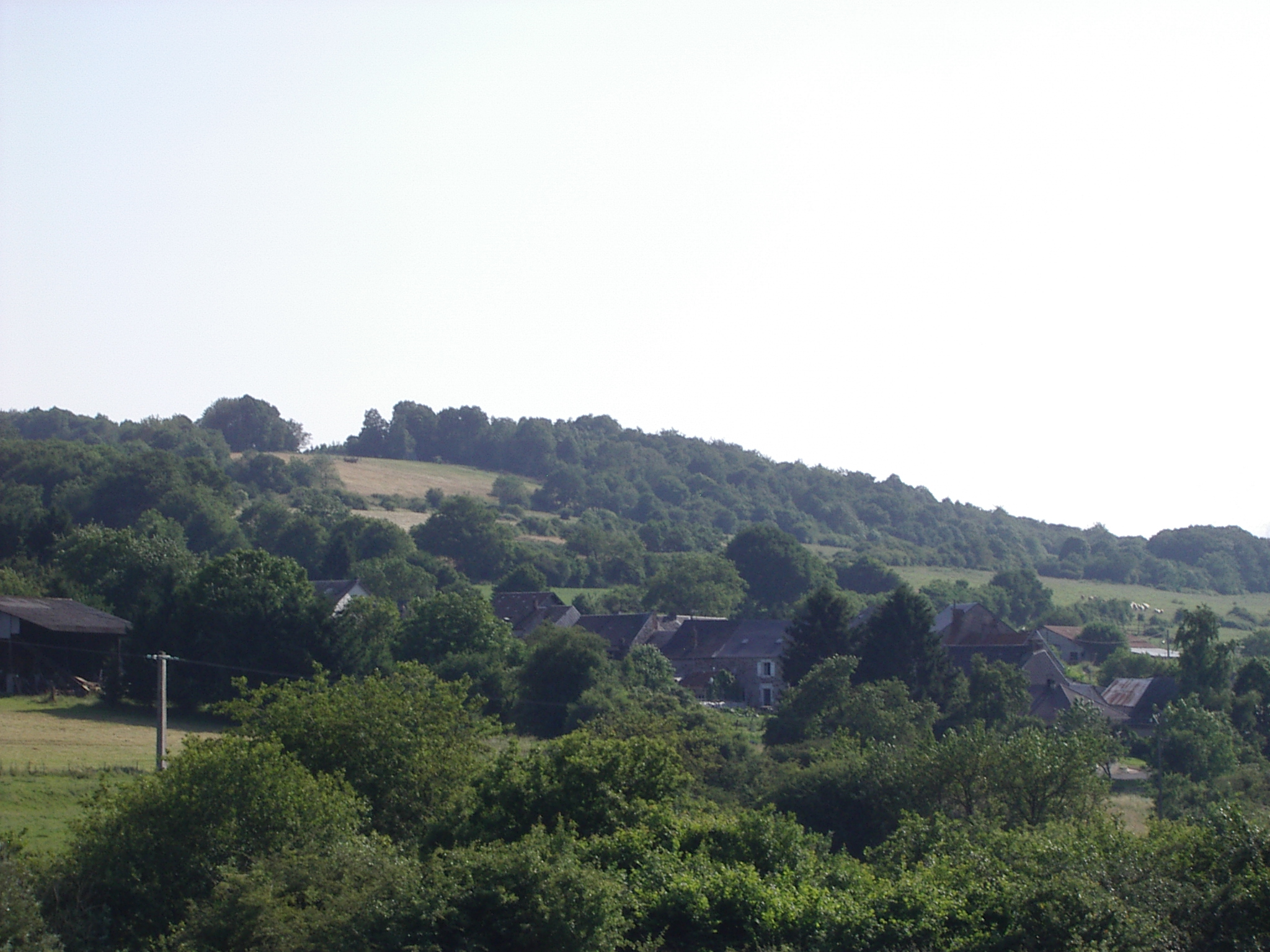
Panorama

== See also ==
- Communes of the Ardennes department
