= Fromelennes =

- Commune
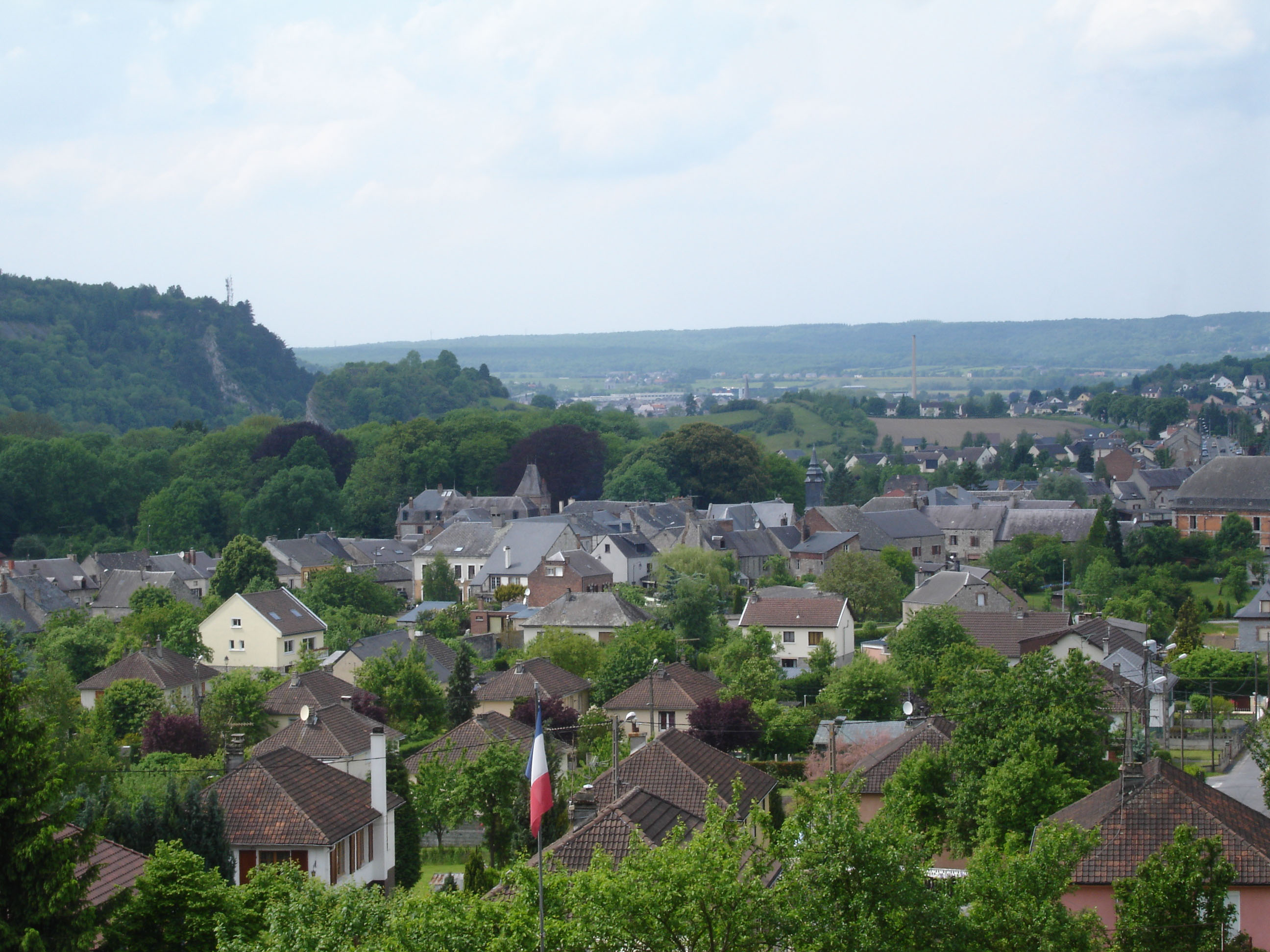
- A general view of Fromelennes

- Coat of arms
- Location of Fromelennes
- Location within France Location within Grand Est
- Coordinates: 50°07′27″N 4°51′36″E
- Country: France
- Region: Grand Est
- Department: Ardennes
- Arrondissement: Charleville-Mézières
- Canton: Givet
- Intercommunality: Ardenne Rives de Meuse

Government
  - Mayor (2020–2026): Pascal Gillaux
- Area^{1}: 7.17 km^{2} (2.77 sq mi)
- Elevation: 118 m (387 ft)
- Population (2023): 1,037
  - Density: 145/km^{2} (375/sq mi)
- Time zone: UTC+01:00 (CET)
  - Summer (DST): UTC+02:00 (CEST)
- INSEE/Postal code: 08183 /08600
- ^{1} French Land Register data, which excludes lakes, ponds, glaciers > 1 km^{2} (0.386 sq mi or 247 acres) and river estuaries.

Fromelennes (French pronunciation: [fʁɔmlɛn]) is a commune in the Ardennes department in northern France.

The Pointe de Givet National Nature Reserve is partly located on the commune.

== Population ==
Historical population
Year	Pop.	±% p.a.
1968	1,440	—
1975	1,452	+0.12%
1982	1,365	−0.88%
1990	1,241	−1.18%
1999	1,142	−0.92%
2007	1,065	−0.87%
2012	1,080	+0.28%
2017	1,038	−0.79%
2023	1,037	−0.02%
Source: INSEE

== See also ==
- Communes of the Ardennes department
