= Rocroi =

- Commune
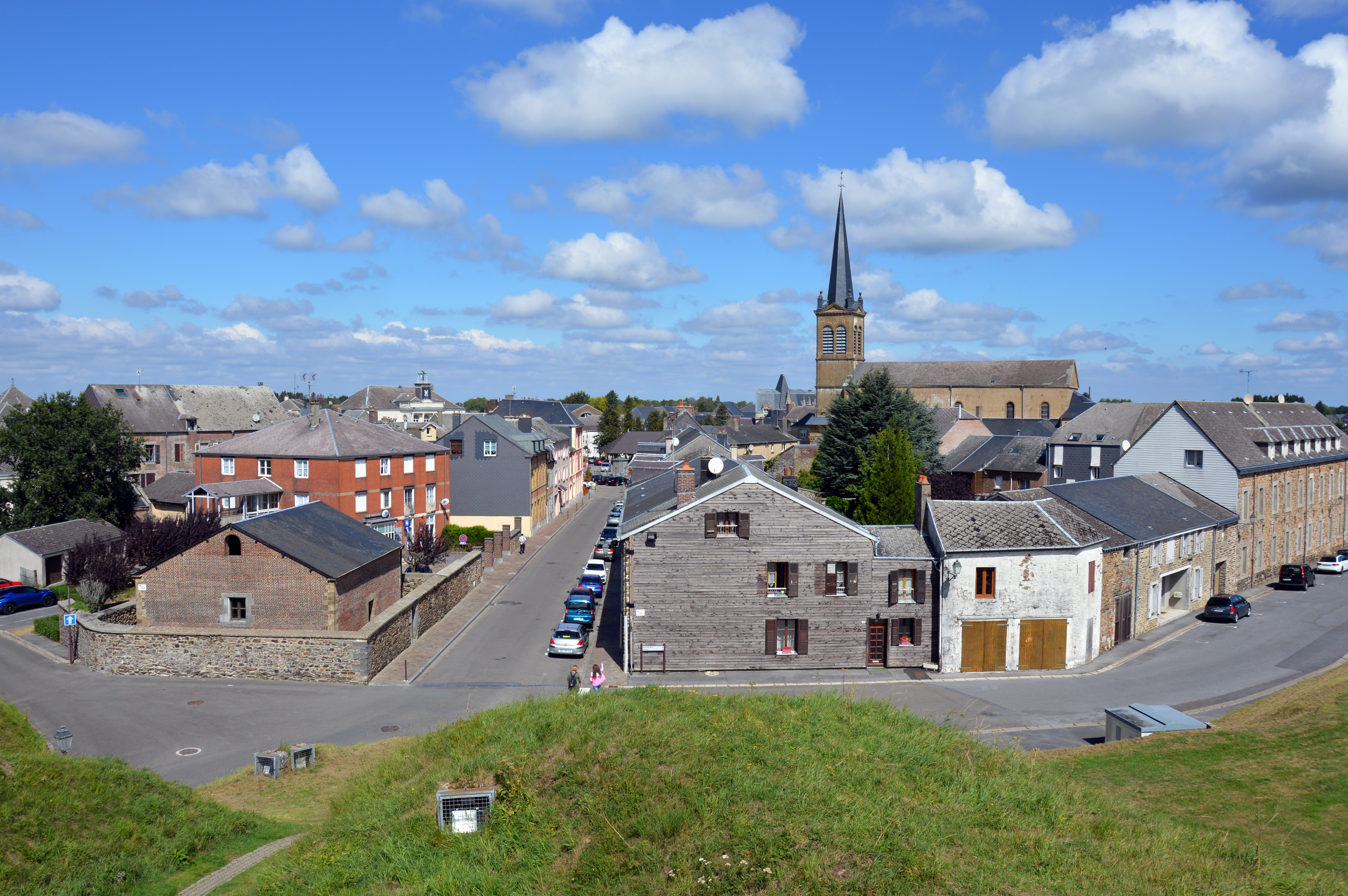
- A general view of Rocroi

- Coat of arms
- Location of Rocroi
- Location within France Location within Grand Est
- Coordinates: 49°55′34″N 4°31′20″E
- Country: France
- Region: Grand Est
- Department: Ardennes
- Arrondissement: Charleville-Mézières
- Canton: Rocroi
- Intercommunality: Vallées et Plateau d'Ardenne

Government
  - Mayor (2020–2026): Denis Binet
- Area^{1}: 50.41 km^{2} (19.46 sq mi)
- Elevation: 385 m (1,263 ft)
- Population (2023): 2,270
  - Density: 45.0/km^{2} (117/sq mi)
- Time zone: UTC+01:00 (CET)
  - Summer (DST): UTC+02:00 (CEST)
- INSEE/Postal code: 08367 /08230
- ^{1} French Land Register data, which excludes lakes, ponds, glaciers > 1 km^{2} (0.386 sq mi or 247 acres) and river estuaries.

Rocroi (French pronunciation: [ʁɔkʁwa]) is a commune in the Ardennes department in northern France.

The central area is a notable surviving example of a bastion fort.

The commune is listed as a Village étape.

== Population ==
Historical population

Year	Pop.	±% p.a.
1793	3,260	—
1800	2,846	−1.92%
1806	3,008	+0.93%
1821	3,501	+1.02%
1831	3,173	−0.98%
1836	3,232	+0.37%
1841	3,780	+3.18%
1846	3,590	−1.03%
1851	3,765	+0.96%
1866	2,998	−1.51%
1872	2,281	−4.45%
1876	2,381	+1.08%
1881	2,977	+4.57%
1886	3,172	+1.28%
1891	2,265	−6.51%
1896	2,193	−0.64%
1901	2,176	−0.16%
1906	2,116	−0.56%

Year	Pop.	±% p.a.
1911	2,256	+1.29%
1921	2,127	−0.59%
1926	2,442	+2.80%
1931	2,436	−0.05%
1936	2,250	−1.58%
1946	1,969	−1.33%
1954	2,348	+2.22%
1962	2,870	+2.54%
1968	2,997	+0.72%
1975	2,911	−0.42%
1982	2,789	−0.61%
1990	2,555	−1.09%
1999	2,420	−0.60%
2007	2,376	−0.23%
2012	2,409	+0.28%
2017	2,330	−0.66%
2023	2,270	−0.43%

Source: EHESS and INSEE (1968-2023)

== History ==
Rocroi was fortified by Francis I of France and expanded by Henry II of France. Because of its strategic location in the north of France it changed hands a number of times during wars. It is best known for the Battle of Rocroi in 1643. In the 1670s the fortifications were re-modelled by the French engineer Vauban.

In 1815, two months after the Battle of Waterloo, the town was taken by Prussian and British forces (on 16 August).

Map of Rocroi fortress (1772)

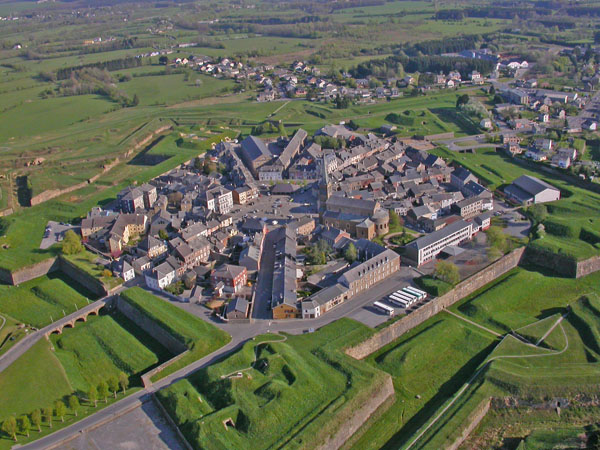
Rocroi seen from the air shows its defensive structure

== See also ==
- Communes of the Ardennes department
- List of bastion forts
