= Foisches =

- Commune
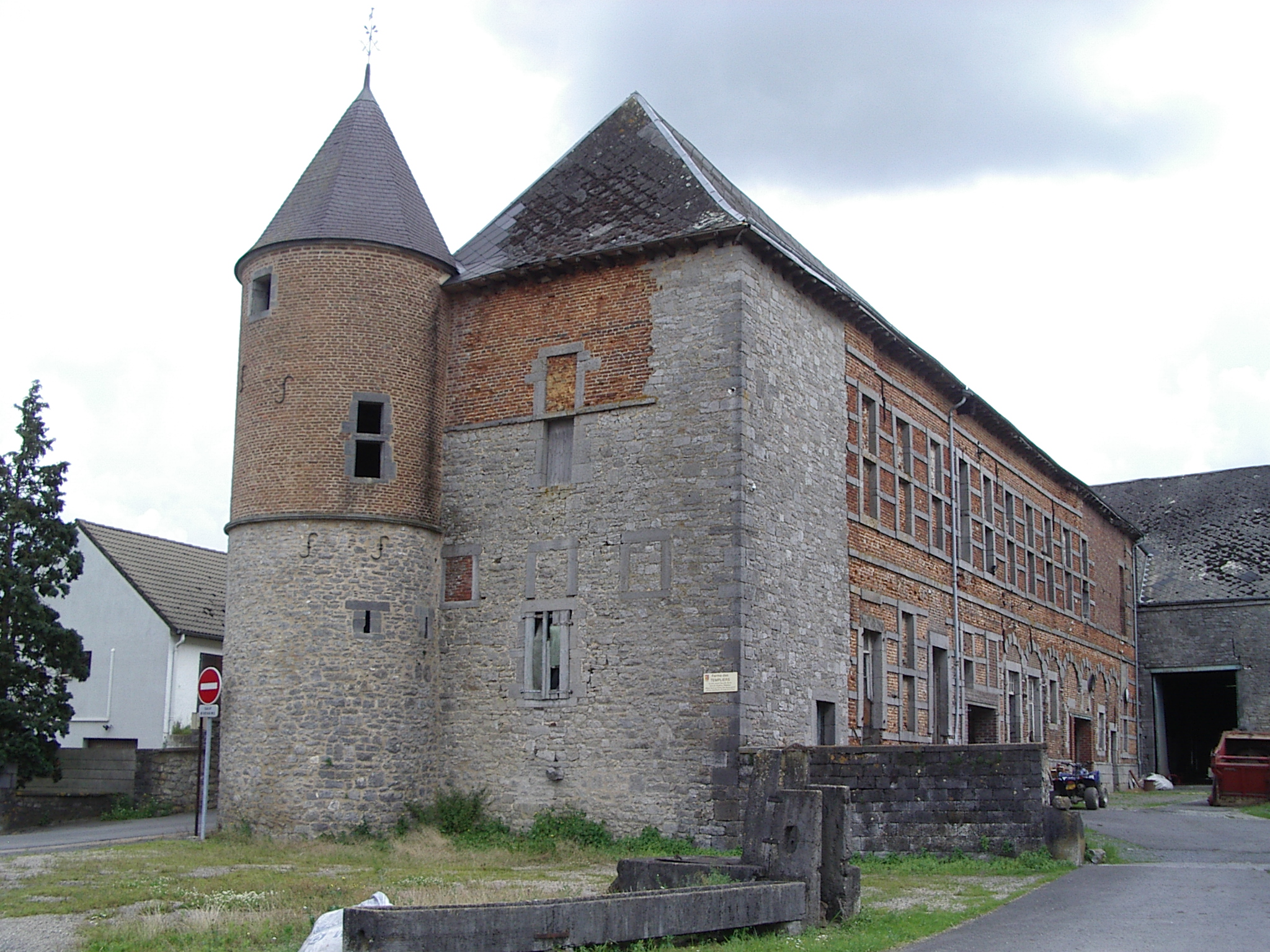
- Templar chateau-farm

- Coat of arms
- Location of Foisches
- Location within France Location within Grand Est
- Coordinates: 50°07′39″N 4°46′48″E
- Country: France
- Region: Grand Est
- Department: Ardennes
- Arrondissement: Charleville-Mézières
- Canton: Givet
- Intercommunality: Ardenne Rives de Meuse

Government
  - Mayor (2020–2026): Richard Debowski
- Area^{1}: 4.65 km^{2} (1.80 sq mi)
- Elevation: 113 m (371 ft)
- Population (2023): 233
  - Density: 50.1/km^{2} (130/sq mi)
- Time zone: UTC+01:00 (CET)
  - Summer (DST): UTC+02:00 (CEST)
- INSEE/Postal code: 08175 /08600
- Website: foisches.fr
- ^{1} French Land Register data, which excludes lakes, ponds, glaciers > 1 km^{2} (0.386 sq mi or 247 acres) and river estuaries.

Foisches (French pronunciation: [fwaʃ]) is a commune in the Ardennes department in northern France.

The Pointe de Givet National Nature Reserve is partly located on the commune.

== Population ==
Historical population
Year	Pop.	±% p.a.
1968	212	—
1975	196	−1.11%
1982	190	−0.44%
1990	215	+1.56%
1999	193	−1.19%
2007	233	+2.38%
2012	213	−1.78%
2017	204	−0.86%
2023	233	+2.24%
Source: INSEE

== See also ==
- Communes of the Ardennes department
