= Gianni Silvestrini =

Italian researcher (born 1947)

Gianni Silvestrini (26 December 1947) is an Italian researcher. From 1977 to 2014, he taught at the University of Palermo and at the National Research Council in the fields of solar technology and energy policy.

== Research activities ==
Silvestrini was born in 1947 in Aosta. From 1977 to 1982, he worked for the University of Palermo in the field of simulation models for solar technologies and energy efficiency in buildings and was visiting researcher at the Lawrence Berkeley Laboratory. Since 1983, he continued his activity at the National Research Council Institute, focused on Energy and Buildings (Ieren). During this period, he was involved in the Task 11 of the International Energy Agency "Passive and hybrid solar commercial buildings".

Since 1988, Silvestrini enlarged his activities in the area of environmental and energy strategies, with studies at urban, regional and national level. A particular attention was given on the issue of global warming, with the preparation of specific studies for the Ministry of Environment. From 2004 to 2006, he was professor at the Politecnico di Milano and has launched the post graduate Master "Ridef – Energy for Kyoto" on energy efficiency and renewable energies that has continued to follow as responsible until now.

Silvestrini is the author of more than 100 scientific papers and co-authored 5 books (“Solar Architecture”, 1984, textbook at Polytechnic of Milan; “The future of sun”, 1990, “La corsa della green economy”, 2010, "2 C, Innovazioni radicali per vincere la sfida del clima e trasformare l'economia", Ed. Ambiente 2016; "Le trappole del clima - E come evitarle". Ed. Ambiente 2020) and is member of the advisory board of different associations and journals in the field of energy.

== Institutional activities ==
He was President of “Bologna-Energia 2010”, the Energy agency of the City of Bologna and acted as Advisor of the Mayor of Palermo in the area of Energy and Environment. From 1997 to 2000 he was advisor of the Minister of Environment and from 2000 to 2002 he was appointed as General Director at the Ministry of the Environment. During this period he has been involved in the policies connected with the Kyoto Protocol, particularly on energy efficiency and in the field of renewable energies.

In this area, Silvestrini coordinated the Italian “10.000 solar roofs” program and launched the "Car Sharing" program in Italy and the "Car Free Sundays" From 2007 to 2008 he was energy advisor of the Minister of Economic Development and was involved in the definitions of new laws on energy efficiency in buildings. From 2006 to 2009 he was President of the Italian Ecolabel section; He has provided information and consulting services to a large variety of clients including Local Municipalities, Regions, Ministries, European Commission, IEA

== Social activities ==
Since 2003 he is the scientific Director of the "Kyoto Club" a not-for-profit association made up of representatives of 230 Italian business, financial, local municipalities that promotes a proactive stance on the global warming issue (www.kyotoclub.org). Since 2002 he is the scientific Director of the bimonthly magazine "Qualenergia" and of the most visited Italian web site specialized on energy efficiency and on renewable energies (www.qualenergia.it). From 2014 to 2016 he has been President of Green Building Council Italy and from 2015 to 2016 President of FREE, the Coordination of 27 Italian Associations on renewable energies and energy efficiency

== Recognition ==
In 2001 he received the “European solar prize 2001” by Eurosolar, for his “extraordinary individual commitment”.

== Entrepreneur activities ==
From 2008 to date he is President of Exalto Energy&Innovation a company involved in research activities, consulting and acting as Esco in the field of renewable energies and energy efficiency (www.exaltoenergia.it).
