= Fortress of Charlemont =

- Fort de Charlemont
- Near Givet
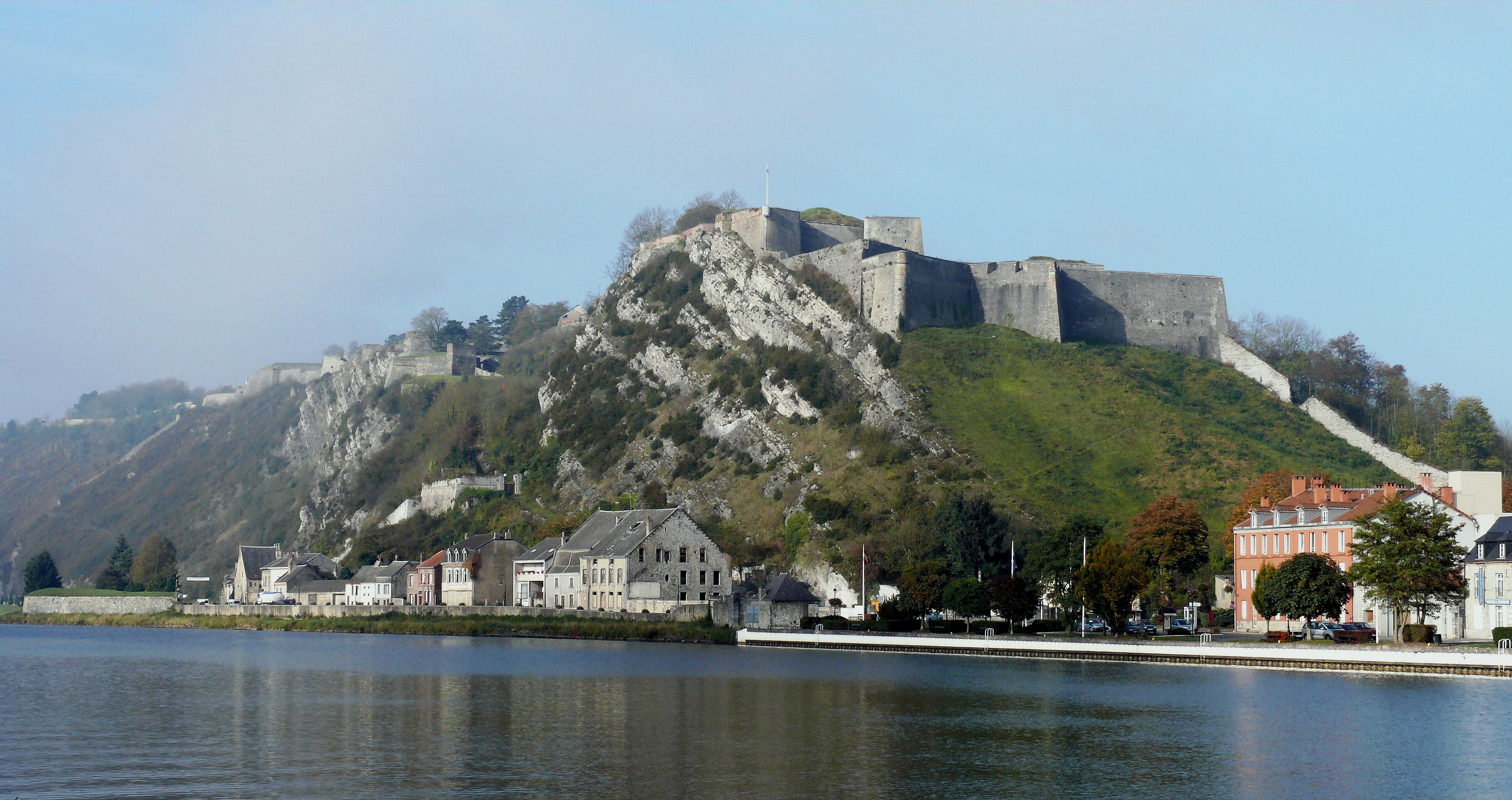
- The Fortress of Charlemont and the village of Givet.

Site information
- Type: Fort

Location
- Fortress of Charlemont (Champagne-Ardenne)
- Coordinates: 50°08′09″N 4°48′13″E

Site history
- Built: 1555

The Fortress of Charlemont (French: Fort de Charlemont) is a French stronghold located near the Belgian border on the Meuse. It is a citadel, surrounded by a network of outworks, including the connecting forts (Givet and the Mont d'Hours). It dominates the town of Givet and when in use as a working fortress controlled the valley of the Meuse.

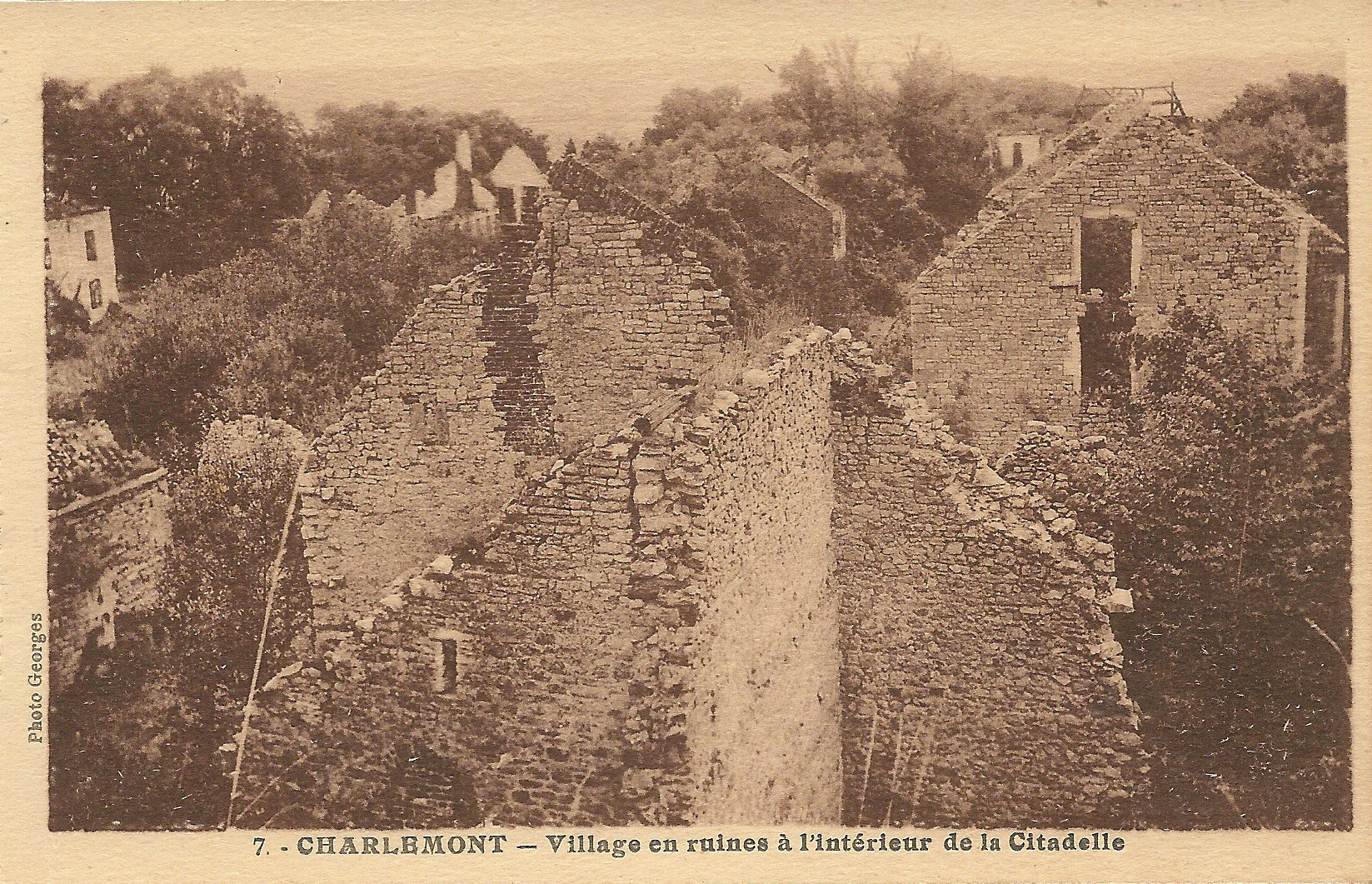
Destruction within the fort after the First World War.

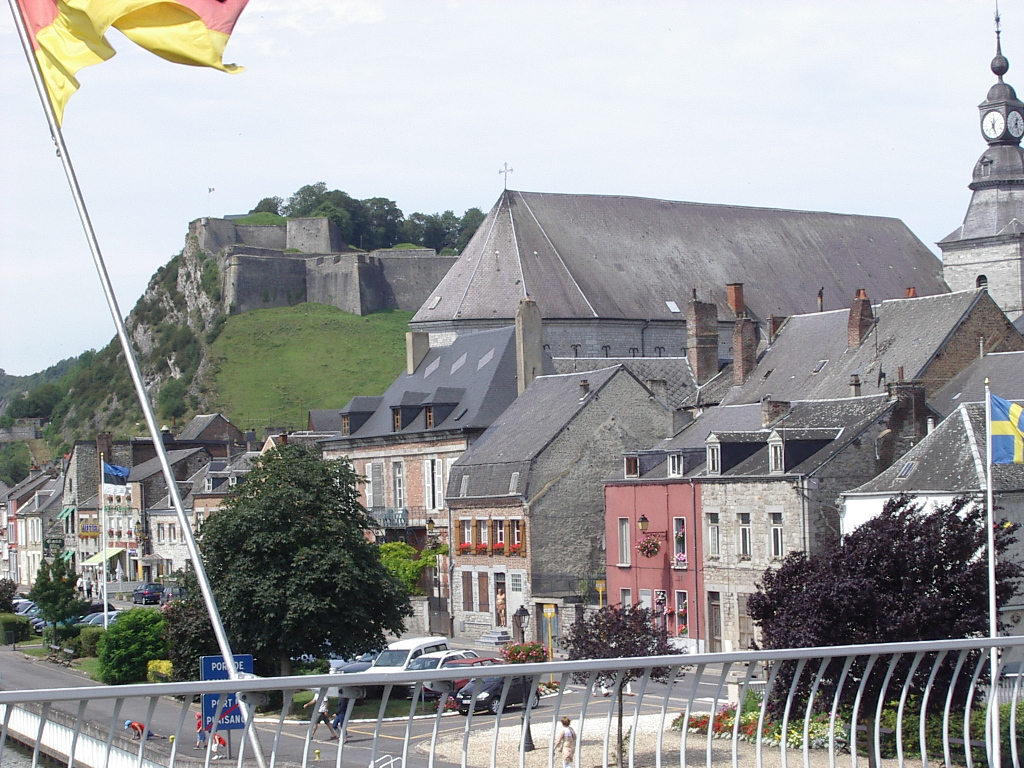
view of the fort from within Givet.

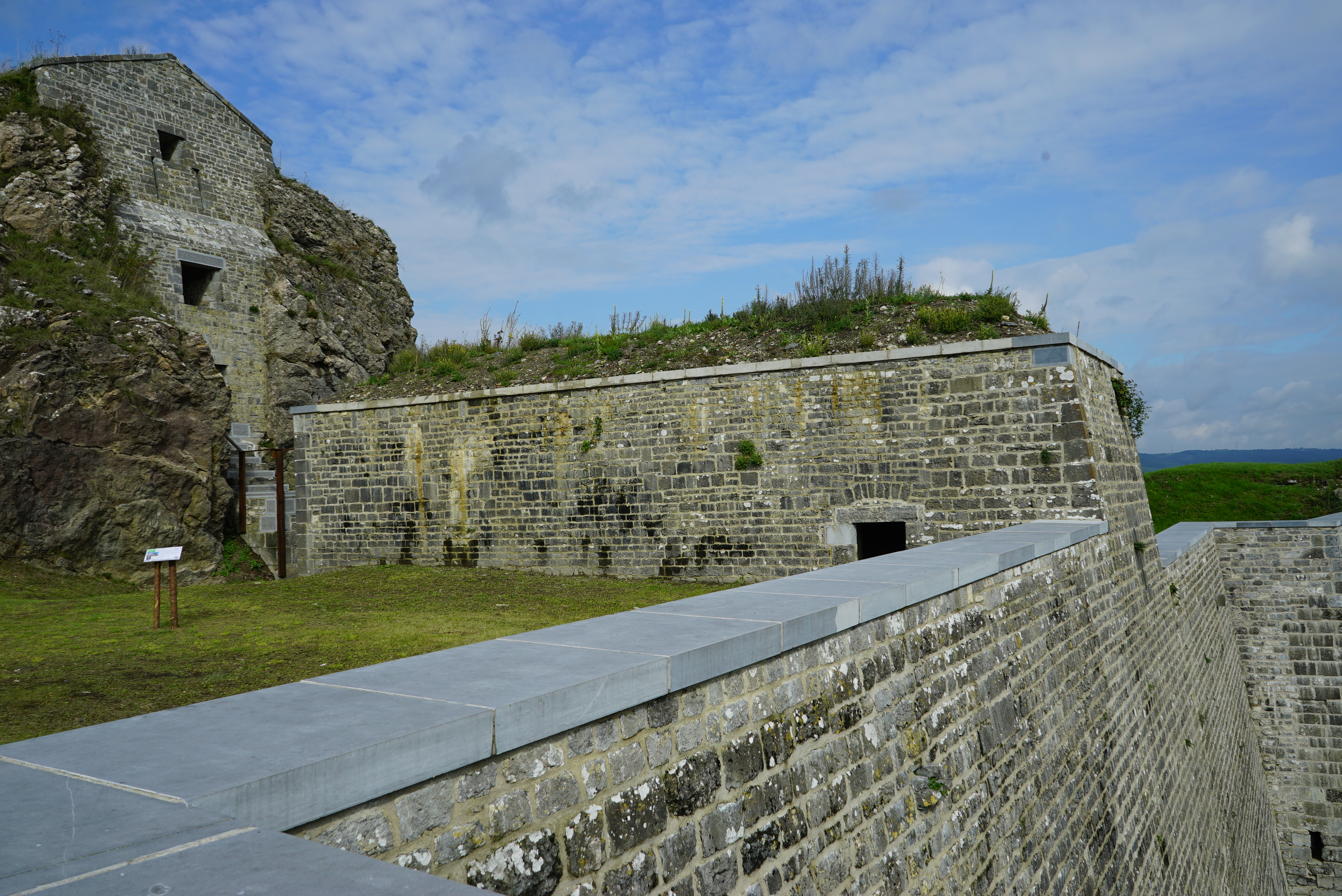
The Maugis Tower.

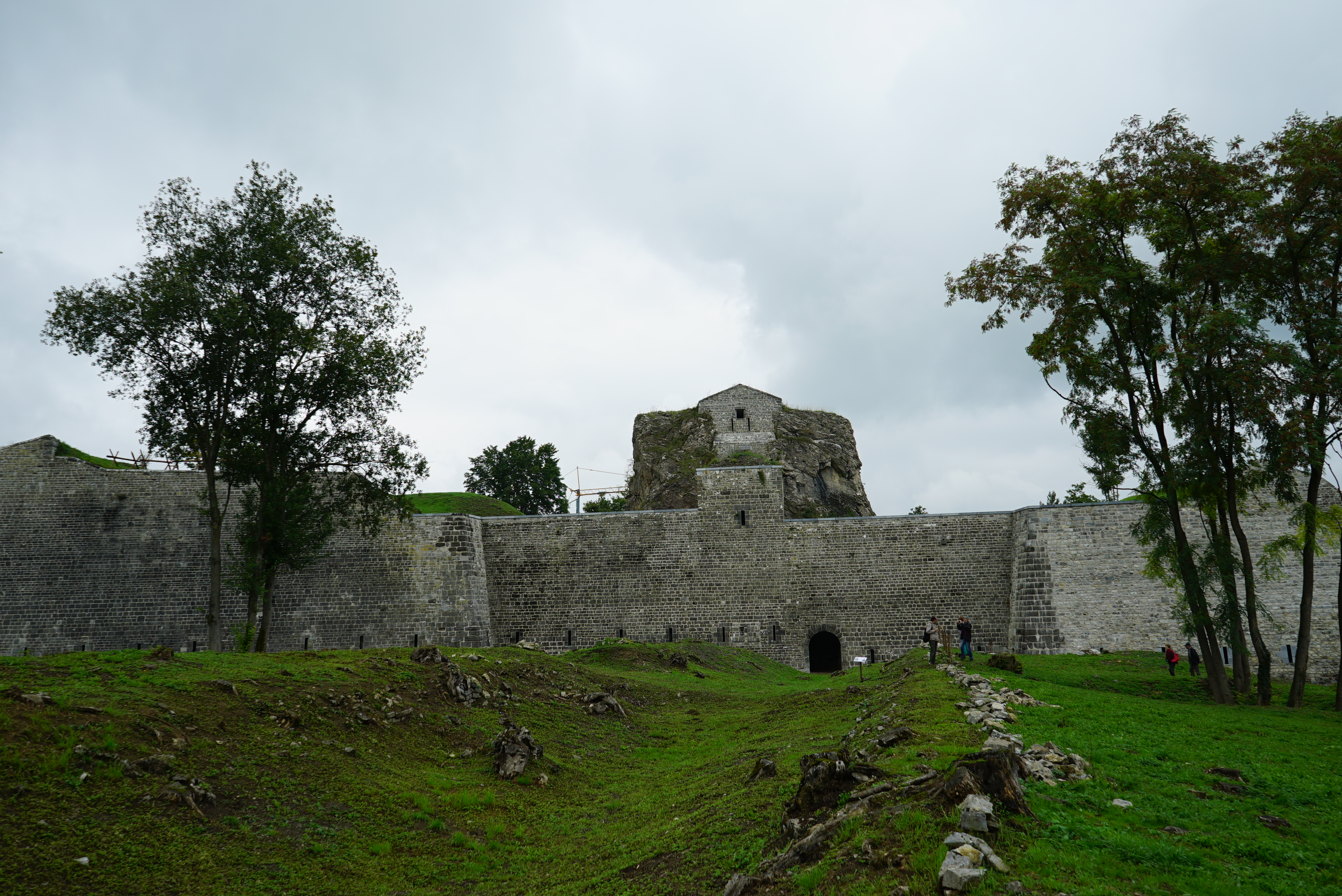
Between Condé Charlemont Covered Path.

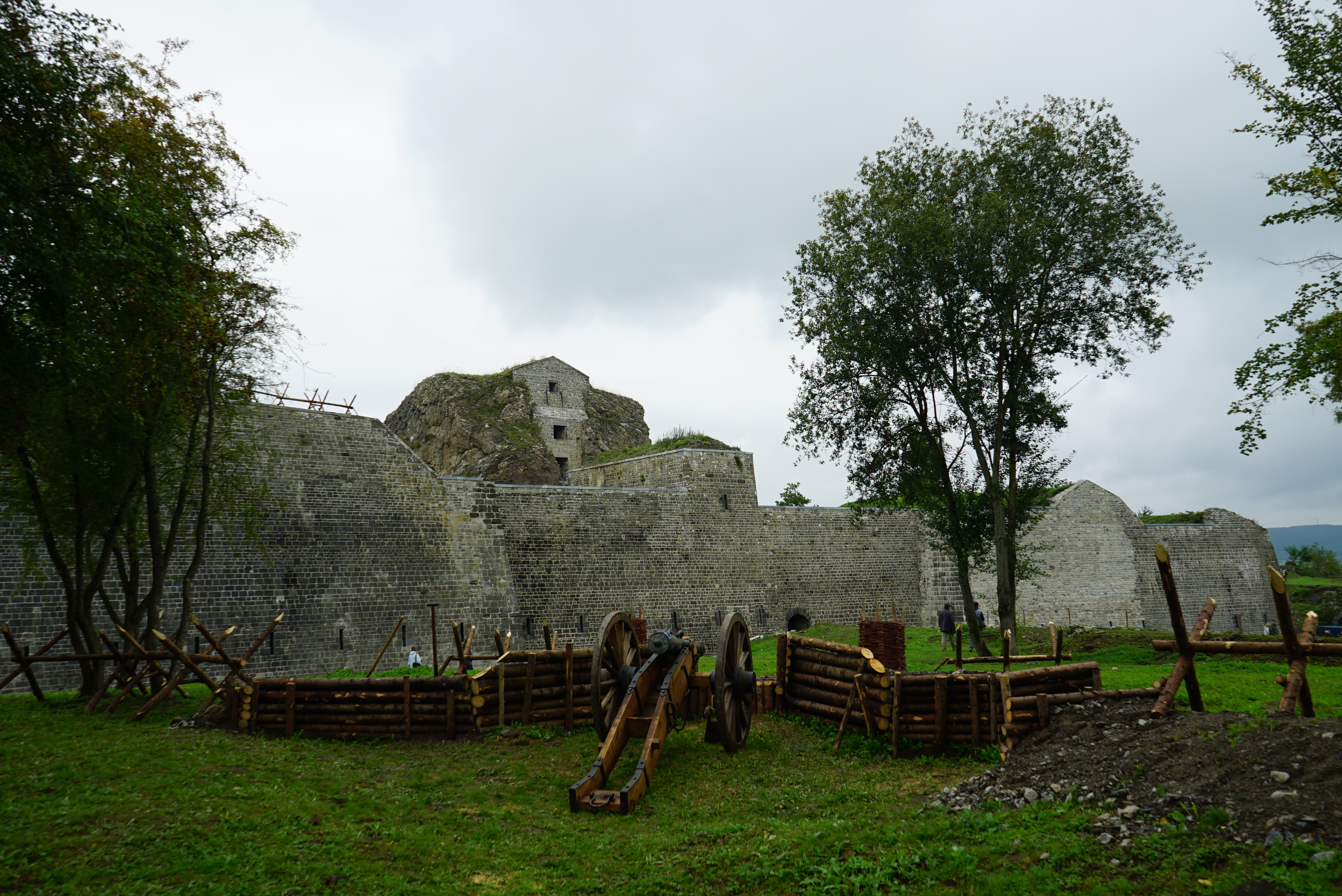
Entrance to Fort Condé.

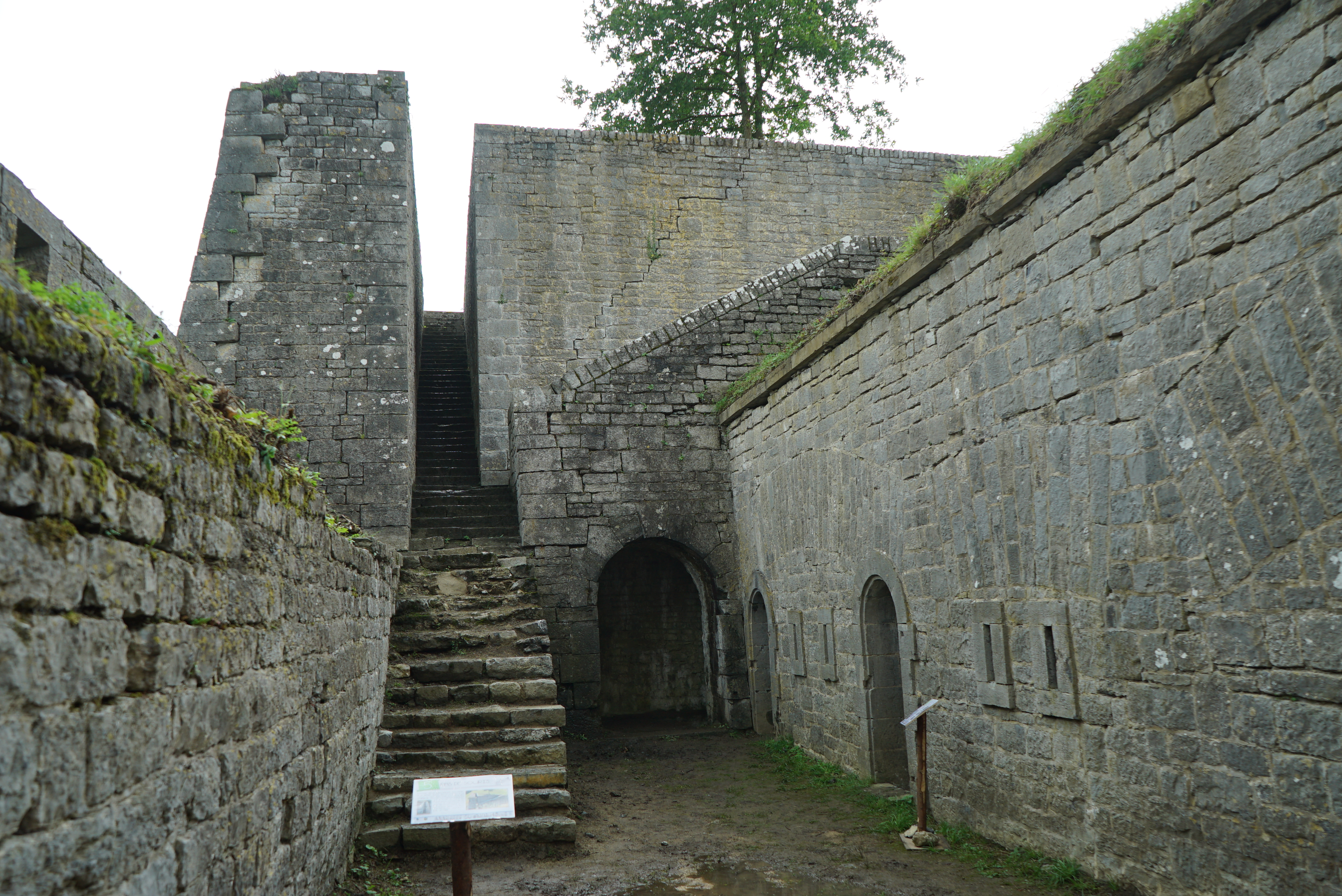
Staircase, the only access point from the glacis to the fort.

== See also ==
- Reduction of the French fortresses in 1815 — this fortress was the last to surrender to the Coalition.
- Meuse Citadels — a group of forts situated along the Meuse river in southern Belgium.
