= Gilles Silvestrini =

- Born: 4 June 1961 (age 64); Givet, France
- Genres: Contemporary
- Occupation: Composer
- Instrument: Oboe

Gilles Silvestrini (born 4 June 1961 in Givet) is a French composer of contemporary music and oboist.

== Works ==
Silvestrini received commissions for chamber music from numerous institutions such as the Festival de Flaine, the Théâtre du Châtelet, the Bibliothèque nationale de France, Musique nouvelle en liberté, France Musique, etc. His Études (1997) were part of the works in the 2014 program of the entrance exam to the oboe class of the Conservatoire national supérieur de musique et de danse de Lyon.
