= Rancennes =

- Commune
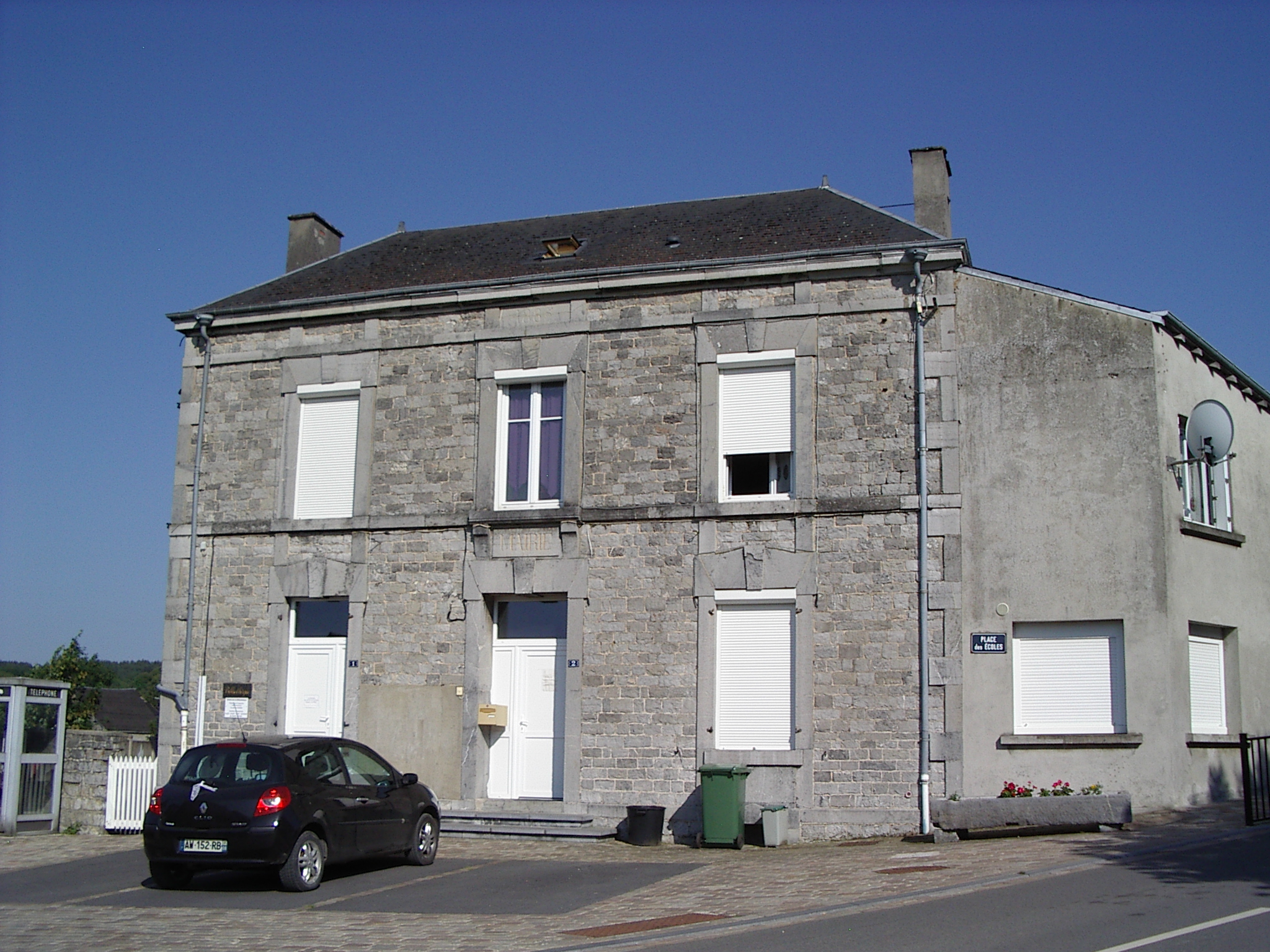
- The town hall in Rancennes

- Coat of arms
- Location of Rancennes
- Location within France Location within Grand Est
- Coordinates: 50°07′03″N 4°49′06″E
- Country: France
- Region: Grand Est
- Department: Ardennes
- Arrondissement: Charleville-Mézières
- Canton: Givet
- Intercommunality: Ardenne Rives de Meuse

Government
  - Mayor (2020–2026): Joël Boucher
- Area^{1}: 6.5 km^{2} (2.5 sq mi)
- Elevation: 156 m (512 ft)
- Population (2023): 709
  - Density: 110/km^{2} (280/sq mi)
- Time zone: UTC+01:00 (CET)
  - Summer (DST): UTC+02:00 (CEST)
- INSEE/Postal code: 08353 /08600
- ^{1} French Land Register data, which excludes lakes, ponds, glaciers > 1 km^{2} (0.386 sq mi or 247 acres) and river estuaries.

Rancennes (French pronunciation: [ʁɑ̃sɛn]) is a commune in the Ardennes department in northern France.

The Pointe de Givet National Nature Reserve is partly located on the commune.

== Population ==
Historical population
Year	Pop.	±% p.a.
1968	437	—
1975	445	+0.26%
1982	609	+4.58%
1990	1,001	+6.41%
1999	828	−2.09%
2007	722	−1.70%
2012	721	−0.03%
2017	719	−0.06%
2023	709	−0.23%
Source: INSEE

== See also ==
- Communes of the Ardennes department
