= Celtic toponymy =

Etymology of placenames derived from Celtic languages

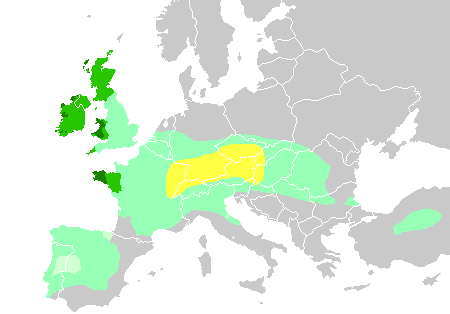
Map of Celtic-influenced regions of Europe, in dark green 1 and 2 : regions where Celtic languages are attested from the Middle Ages until today

Celtic toponymy is the study of place names wholly or partially of Celtic origin. These names are found throughout continental Europe, Britain, Ireland, Anatolia and, latterly, through various other parts of the globe not originally occupied by Celts.

== Celtic languages ==
The Proto-Indo-European language developed into various daughter languages, including the Proto-Celtic language.

In Proto-Celtic ("PC"), the Proto-Indo-European ("PIE") sound *p disappeared, perhaps through an intermediate *ɸ. It is a common point between all the Celtic languages. Examples : Latin pater "father", but Gaulish *atir / ater (atrebo, dativ plural), (Old) Irish athair / athir.

After that, languages derived from Proto-Celtic changed PC *k^{w} into either *p or *k (see: P-Celtic and Q-Celtic languages). In P-Celtic languages, PC *k^{w} changed into *p. In Q-Celtic dialects it developed into /k/.

P-Celtic languages include the Continental Gaulish language and the Brittonic branch of Insular Celtic. Common Brittonic is the ancestor of Welsh, Cornish and Breton.

Ancient Q-Celtic languages include the Continental Celtiberian and the Goidelic branch of Insular Celtic. Goidelic is the ancestor of the Gaelic languages Irish, Scottish Gaelic and Manx.

Examples : PIE *kʷetwóres "four" >

- Proto-Italic *kʷettwōr "four" > Latin quattuor
- Proto-Celtic *kʷetwares "four" > Irish ceathair, Scottish Gaelic ceithir "four", but Gaulish petuar[ios] "fourth", Welsh pedwar "four", Old Breton petguar > Breton pevar "four"

== Frequent elements in place-names and their cognates in modern Celtic languages ==
- Celtic *-āko-, suffix : Gaulish -(i)acon (Latin -(i)acum / (i)acus) < endings -[a]y, -[e]y, -é, -(i)ac in Gaul. Brittonic *-ocon / -*ogon 'place of, property of'; Old Breton -oc > -euc > -ek / -eg (-ec), Welsh -(i)og, etc.
- Celtic *bonus, *bona 'base, foundation' > Old Irish bun 'base, stem, stock', Welsh bon 'base, stem, stock'
- Celtic *briga 'hill, high place' > Welsh bri 'honourable, respected' (not directly related to Welsh bryn 'hill'), Irish brí 'hill; strength, vigour, significance'.
- Celtic *brigant- 'high, lofty, elevated'; used as a feminine divine name, rendered Brigantia in Latin, Old Irish Brigit 'exalted one', name of a goddess.
- Celtic *brīwa, *brīua 'bridge'
- Celtic *dubros 'water' > Old Irish dobur 'water', Welsh Welsh dw[f]r, Cornish dur, Breton dour 'water'
- Celtic *dūnon 'fortress' > Welsh dinas 'city' and din 'fortress', Irish dún 'fortress'
- Celtic *duro- 'door, gate, forum' > Welsh dor, Breton dor 'door'
- Celtic *ialo- 'clearing (wood), assart' > Welsh (tir) ial
- Celtic *k^{w}enno- 'head' > Gallo-Brythonic *penn-, Welsh pen 'head, end, chief, supreme', Breton penn, but Old Irish cenn > Irish ceann 'head'
- Celtic *magos 'field, plain' > Welsh maes 'field', Old Irish mag > Irish magh 'plain'
- Celtic *nemeto- 'wood', 'sacred enclosure', 'sanctuary' > Old Irish nemed 'sanctuary'
- Celtic *rito- 'ford' > Welsh rhyd 'ford'
- Celtic *windo- 'white, fair, blessed' > Welsh gwyn/wyn / gwen/wen 'white, blessed', Old Irish find, Irish fionn 'fair'

== European connection ==
- Brigantes
- Cambodunum > Champéon (France, Cambdonno / Cambindonno 6-7th century), Champbezon (France, Chambedon 11th century), Kempten (Germany, Camboduno 3rd century)
- Mediolanum > Meulan (France), Milano (Italy)..
- Noviomagus > Nouvion, Nogent, Novion, Nijon, etc. (France), Nijmegen (Netherland); former name of Chichester & Crayford, England
- Ebur(i)acum > Ivry, Évry (France), former name of York, England
- Epiacum > Epfig (Alsace, France, Epiaco 12th century); X (unknown location in Great-Britain)
- Lugdunum > Lyon, Lion, Loudun, Laon, Lauzun (France), Leiden / Leyde (Netherlands)
- Rigomagus > Riom (France), Remagen (Germany)
- Segodunum > Suin, Syon (France); X unclear location near Würzburg (Germany)
- Vuerodunum > several Verdun (France), Verduno (Italy, Piedmont), Verdú (Spain, Catalonia), Birten (Germany, Xanten)

== Continental Celtic ==
=== Austria ===
- Bregenz, Vorarlberg, Latin Brigantium : from Celtic *brigant- 'high, lofty, elevated' (or divine name, Brigantia)
- Wien, English Vienna, Latin Vindobona : from Celtic *windo- 'white' (Welsh gwyn) + *bona 'base, foundation' (Welsh bôn 'base, bottom, stump', Irish bun 'bottom, base')

=== Belgium ===
- Ardennes, Latin Arduenna Silva : from divine name Arduinna : from Celtic *ardu- 'high' (Irish ard) + Latin silva 'forest'
- Gent, English Ghent, Latin Gandavum : from divine name Gontia

=== France ===
Most of the main cities in France have a Celtic name (the original Gaulish one or the name of the Gaulish tribe).

- Amiens : from Ambiani, a Celtic tribe, replaces Samarobriva 'bridge on the river Somme'
- Angers : from Andecavi, a Celtic tribe, replaces Juliomagus 'market place dedicated to Julius'
- Argentan : from Argentomagus 'silver market', based on arganto- 'silver' cognate to Old Welsh argant > ariant, Old Breton argant > Breton arc'hant 'silver' + magos 'market'
  - several places called Argenton
- Argentorate, now Strasbourg
- Arles : from Arelate
- Arras : from Atrebates, a Celtic tribe, replaces Nemetacum, nemeto- 'sacred place' + suffix -acon
- Augustonemetum, now Clermont-Ferrand
- Autun : from Augustodunum, 'town dedicated to Augustus'
- Avignon : from Avenii a Celtic tribe. It was one of the three cities of the Cavari
- Bayeux : from Badiocassi / Bodiocassi, a Celtic tribe, replaces Augustodurum. 'forum dedicated to Augustus'
- Bourges : from Biturigi, a Celtic tribe, replaces Avaricum
- Briançon < Brigantium, from Celtic *brigant- 'high, lofty, elevated' (or divine name, Brigantia)
  - several places called Briançon
- Brive < Briva 'bridge'
  - several places called Brives
- Caen < Catumagos : from Old Celtic *catu- 'battle' 'fight' 'combat', Old Irish cath 'battle, battalion, troop', Breton -kad /-gad, Welsh cad 'combat, troop'; 'mago- 'field, plain', Old Irish magh. The general meaning seems to be 'battlefield'
  - several places called Cahan, Cahon
- Cahors
- Carentan : from Carentomagus
  - several places called Charenton, etc.
- Chambord
  - several places called Chambord, Chambors, Chambourg
- Chartres : from Carnuti, name of a Celtic tribe, replaces Autricum
- Condom : from Condatomagus
  - other place : Condom-d'Aubrac
- Divodurum (Latin), now Metz, Lorraine, from Celtic *diwo- 'god, holy, divine' (Scottish Gaelic dia 'god') + **duro- 'fort'
- Douvres (also the French name of Dover) from Celtic dubron, dubra 'water'
  - several places called Douvres
- Drevant : from Derventum, Celtic dervo 'oak tree' + suffix -entu
- Évreux : from Eburovici replaces Mediolanum (see below)
- Issoudun
- Jort : from Divoritum 'ford on the river Dives' (Dives from Celtic *dewo 'stream')
- Lillebonne : from Juliobona 'foundation dedicated to Julius'
- Limoges
- Lisieux < (Civitas) Lexoviensis; former Noviomagus 'new market', Old Celtic *noviios 'new', *magos 'field, plain'.
- Lyon, Rhône, Latin Lugdunum : from Celtic *lug- 'Lugus' (divine name) or perhaps 'light' + *dūnon 'fortress'
  - several places called Lugdunum : Laon, Lion-en-Beauce, Loudun, Saint-Bertrand-de-Comminges, etc.
- Mediolanum : from Celtic
  - several places called Meillant, Meulan, etc.
- Nant
  - several places called Nant, Nans
- Nantes
- Nanteuil
  - several places called Nanteuil, Nantheuil, Nampteuil, Nanteau..
- Nanterre (Nemptu doro 5th century) : from nemeto- 'sacred place' + duro- 'gate', 'forum'
- Noyon, Latin Noviomagus Veromanduorum, from Celtic *nowijo- 'new' (Welsh newydd) + *magos 'field, plain'
  - several places called Noviomagus : Nouvion, Noyen, Nyons, Nijon, Nojeon, Lisieux, Saint-Paul-Trois-Châteaux, etc.
- Oissel
  - several places called Oisseau, Ussel, etc.
- Orange : from Arausio, a water god
- Paris : from Parisii (Gaul), name of a Celtic tribe, replaces Lukotekia / Lutetia
- Périgueux / Périgord : from Petrocorii 'the four armies'
- Pierremande < Petromantalum < petro-mantalo- 'four road' = 'crossing'
- Rennes : from Redones, a Celtic tribe, replaces Condate
  - several places called Condé, Condat, Candé, etc.
- Riom : from Rigomagus
- Rouen < Rotomagus, sometimes Ratómagos or Ratumacos (on the coins of the Veliocassi tribe). It can be roto-, the word for 'wheel' or 'race', cf. Old Irish roth 'wheel' 'race' or Welsh rhod 'wheel' 'race'. Magos is surer here : 'field', 'plain' or later 'market' cf. Old Irish mag (gen. maige) 'field' 'plain', Old Breton ma 'place'. The whole thing could mean 'hippodrome', 'racecourse' or 'wheel market'.
  - several places called Rouans, Ruan, Rom, etc.
- Vandœuvre < *vindo-briga 'white fortress'
  - several places called Vandœuvres, Vendeuvre, Vendœuvres
- Verdun, Virodunum or Verodunum, from Celtic *uiro-, *uero- 'high' and *dūnon 'hill, fortress'
  - several places called Verdun
- Verneuil : from verno- + ialo- 'clearing, plain with alder-trees'
  - several places called Verneuil
- Vernon < Vernomagus. There are other Vernons in France, but they come directly from Vernō 'place of the alder-trees'. 'plain of the alder-trees'. uernā 'alder-tree', Old Irish fern, Breton, Welsh gwern, dial. French verne / vergne.
  - several places called Vernon
- Veuves : from vidua 'forest' Voves, Vion
  - several places called Voves, Vove
- Vion : from Vidumagus 'forest market'
  - several places called Vion, Vions

=== Germany ===
- Alzenau

From Celtic *alisa, s.f., 'alder'. (Compare the modern German Erlenbach) and Old High German (OHG) aha, s.n., 'flowing water'.

- de Amarahe (?), a lost river name near Fulda c. 800 CE
- Amerbach, a stream near Groß-Umstadt, Babenhausen, Ober-Ramstadt
- Ammer
- Ammerbach
- Ammergraben, a stream near Harpertshausen
- Amorbach, a stream near Mümling and the village named after it.
- Amorsbrunn
- Wald-Amorbach < Perhaps from Celtic *ambara, 'channel, river'. Compare Indo-European *amer-, 'channel, river' > Greek ἀμάρη (amárē), 'channel'. Or, from Celtic *amara, 'spelt, a type of grain'.
- Annelsbach a suburb of Höchst
- Ansbach in Mittelfranken originally Onoltesbah 837 CE : from Celtic *onno-, 'ash tree' plus an OHG bach, 'small river'.
- Boiodurum, now Innstadt, Passau, Niederbayern : first element is Celtic *Boio-, tribal name (Boii), possibly 'cattle-owner' (cf. Irish bó 'cow') or 'warrior'. Second element is Celtic *duro- 'fort'.
- Bonn : from Celtic *bona 'base, foundation' (Welsh bôn 'base, bottom, stump')
- Boppard : from Gaulish Boudobriga, "hill of victory". Containing the elements *boudo- 'victory' (Welsh budd 'gain, benefit') + *briga, 'hill'.
- Düren, Nordrhein-Westfalen, Latin Durum : from Celtic *duro- 'fort'
- Hercynia Silva (Latin), a vast forest including the modern Black Forest : from Celtic *(φ)erkunos 'oak' or divine name Perkwunos + Latin silva 'forest'
- Kempten im Allgäu, Bavaria, Latin Cambodūnum : Celtic cambodūnom, *cambo- 'curved, bent, bowed, crooked', dūnon 'fortress'
- Mainz, Rheinland-Pfalz, Latin Moguntiacum : from Celtic *mogunt-, 'mighty, great, powerful', used as a divine name (see Mogons) + Celtic suffix -(i)acon
- Meggingen : from Celtic *mago- 'plain, field'
- Neumagen-Dhron, Rheinland-Pfalz, Latin Noviomagus Trevirorum
- Noviomagus Nemetum (Latin), now Speyer, Rheinland-Pfalz : from Celtic *nowijo- 'new' (Welsh newydd) + *magos 'field, plain'
- Remagen, Rheinland-Pfalz, Latin Rigomagus or Ricomagus : second element is from Celtic *magos 'field, plain'. The first may be a variant of Celtic *rigi- 'king, chief of *touta'
- Tübingen : maybe hybrid form comprising a Celtic element and a Germanic suffix -ingen. The element tub- in Tübingen could possibly arise from a Celtic dubo-, s.m., 'dark, black; sad; wild'. As found in the Anglo-Irish placenames of Dublin, Devlin, Dowling, Doolin and Ballindoolin. Perhaps the reference is to the darkness of the river waters that flow near the town cf. river Doubs (France) and Dove (GB); if so, then the name can be compared to Tubney, Tubbanford, Tub Hole in England. Compare the late Vulgar Latin tubeta 'morass', from Gaulish. The root is found in Old Irish dub > Irish dubh, Old Welsh dub > Welsh du, Old Cornish duw > Middle Cornish du, Breton du, Gaulish dubo-, dubis, all meaning 'black; dark'
- Worms, Rheinland-Pfalz, Latin Borbetomagus : second element from Celtic *magos, 'plain, field', first perhaps related to Old Irish borb 'fierce, violent, rough, arrogant; foolish'

=== Hungary ===
- Hercynium jugum (Latin) : from Celtic *(φ)erkunos 'oak' or divine name Perkwunos + Latin jugum 'summit'

=== Italy ===
- Brianza, Lombardy, Latin Brigantia : from Celtic *brigant- 'high, lofty, elevated' (or divine name, Brigantia)
- Genova, Liguria, English Genoa, Latin Genua : Perhaps from Celtic *genu- 'mouth [of a river]'. (However, this Ligurian place-name, as well as that of Genava (modern Geneva), probably derive the Proto-Indo-European root *ĝenu- 'knee'.)
- Milano, Lombardy, English Milan, Latin Mediolanum : from Celtic medio- 'middle, central' > Old Irish mide 'middle, centre', Old Breton med, met > Breton mez 'middle', etc. and *ɸlan- > *lan-, a Celtic cognate of Latin plānus 'plain', with typical Celtic loss of /p/ or *ɸlānos > Old Irish lán, Welsh llawn, Breton leun 'full'
- Belluno, Veneto, Latin Bellunum : from Celtic **Bhel- 'bright' and *dūnon 'fortress'.
- Bergamo, Lombardy, Latin Bergomum : from Celtic *brigant- 'high, lofty, elevated' (or divine name, Brigantia)
- Brescia, Lombardy, Latin Brixia : from Celtic *briga- 'rocky height or outcrop'.
- Bologna, Emilia Romagna, Latin Bononia : from Celtic **bona 'base, foundation' (Welsh bôn 'base, bottom, stump')

=== Netherlands ===
- Lugdunum Batavorum (Latin), now Katwijk, Zuid-Holland : from Celtic *lug- 'Lugus' (divine name) or perhaps 'light' + *dūnon 'fortress'
- Nijmegen, Gelderland, Latin Ulpia Noviomagus Batavorum : from Celtic *nowijo- 'new' (Welsh newydd) + *magos 'field, plain'

=== Poland ===
- Lugidunum (Latin), now (maybe) Legnica, Silesia : second element from Celtic *dūnon 'fortress'

=== Portugal ===
- Braga, Braga Municipality, Portugal : from Celtic *bracari- after the Bracari Celts.
- Bragança, Alto Trás-os-Montes, Portugal : from Celtic *brigant- 'divine name, Brigantia'.
- Beira : from Celtic *beira- Cailleach/ Cale's other name Cailleach-Bheura or Beira, the Celtic Goddess of mountains, water and Winter. Three Portuguese provinces: Beira-Baixa, Beira-Alta and Beira-Litoral
- Vale de Cambra, Portugal : from Celtic *cambra- 'chamber, room'.
- Conímbriga, Coimbra, Portugal : from Celtic *briga- 'rocky height or outcrop'.
- Évora, Alentejo, Portugal : from Celtic *ebora- 'plural genitive of the word eburos (trees)'.
- Lacobriga, Algarve, Portugal : from Celtic *Lacobriga- 'Lake of Briga'.

=== Romania ===
- Băișoara and other sites in Transylvania
- Boian in Sibiu, Boianu Mare in Bihor County, villages coming from Boii
- Călan city in Hunedoara.
- Deva, capital of Hunedoara, originally a city of the Dacians
- Galați
- Noviodunum now Isaccea means "new fortress" *nowijo- + *dūn-.
- Timiș River in Banat.

=== Serbia ===
- Singidunum (Latin), now Beograd, English Belgrade : second element from Celtic *dūnon 'fortress'

=== Slovenia ===
- Celje, Latinized Celeia in turn from *keleia, meaning 'shelter' in Celtic
- Neviodunum (Latin), now Drnovo : second element from Celtic *dūnon 'fortress'

=== Spain ===
==== Asturias and Cantabria ====
- Deva, several rivers in northern Spain, and Pontedeva, Galicia, Spain : from Celtic *diwā- 'goddess; holy, divine'
- Mons Vindius (now the Cantabrian Mountains), NW Spain : from Celtic *windo- 'white'.

==== Castile ====
- Segovia, Castile and León, Spain, Greek Segoubía : from *segu-, conjectured to be Celtic for 'victorious', 'strength' or 'dry' (theories).

==== Galicia ====
- Tambre, a river in Galicia (Spain), Latin Tamaris : possibly from Celtic *tames- 'dark' (cf. Celtic *temeslos > Welsh tywyll 'darkness'). Other theories.
- O Grove, Medieval Latin Ogrobre 912: from Celtic *ok-ro- 'acute; promontory' and Celtic *brigs 'hill'.
- Bergantiños, Medieval Latin Bregantinos 830 : from Celtic *brigant- 'high, lofty, elevated', or divine name Brigantia, or from Celtic *brigantīnos 'chief, king'.
- Dumbría, Medieval Latin Donobria 830 : from Celtic *dūnon 'fortress' + Celtic **brīwa 'bridge'.
- Val do Dubra and Dubra River, Galicia : from Celtic *dubr- 'water', *dubrās 'waters' (Welsh dwfr).
- Monforte de Lemos (region), Latin Lemavos, after the local tribe of the Lemavi : from Celtic *lemo- 'elm' + suffix -avo.
- Nendos (region), Medieval Latin Nemitos 830 : from Celtic *nemeton 'sanctuary'.
- Noia, Galicia, Spain, Greek Nouion: from Celtic *nowijo- 'new' (Welsh newydd).

=== Switzerland ===
Switzerland, especially the Swiss Plateau, has many Celtic (Gaulish) toponyms. This old layer of names was overlaid with Latin names in the Gallo-Roman period, and, from the medieval period, with Alemannic German and Romance names.

For some names, there is uncertainty as to whether they are Gaulish or Latin in origin. In some rare cases, such as Frick, Switzerland, there have even been competing suggestions of Gaulish, Latin and Alemannic etymologies.

Examples of toponyms with established Gaulish etymology:

- Solothurn, from Salodurum. The *-durum element means "doors, gates; palisade; town". The etymology of the *salo- element is unclear.
- Thun, Bern: *dunum "fort"
- Windisch, Aargau, Latin Vindonissa: first element from *windo- "white"
- Winterthur, Zürich, Latin Vitudurum or Vitodurum, from *vitu "willow" and *durum
- Yverdon-les-Bains, from Eburodunum, from *eburo- "yew" and *dunum "fort".
- Zürich, Latin Turicum, from a Gaulish personal name Tūros
- Limmat, from Lindomagos "lake-plain", originally the name of the plain formed by the Linth and Lake Zurich.

== Insular Celtic ==
=== Brittonic ===
==== England (excluding Cornwall) ====
The main survey of Celtic place-names in this region is by Richard Coates and Andrew Breeze. Evidence for a Celtic root to place names in England is widely strengthened by early monastic charters, chronicles and returns: examples relate to Leatherhead and Lichfield. To describe a place as of the Celts, the Old English wealh becoming Wal/Wall/Welsh is often used. This was the main Germanic term for Romano-Celtic peoples, such as the Britons. Such names are a minority, but are widespread across England. For example, a smattering of villages around the heart and east of The Fens hint at this: West Walton, Walsoken, and the Walpoles indicate their continued presence. Nearby Wisbech, King's Lynn and Chatteris have Celtic topographical elements.

- Amwythig (Welsh; Shrewsbury), Shropshire, from Brittonic *ambi-uk-t-iko ("little defense").
- Arden (forest of), Warwickshire - from Celtic *ardu- 'high' (Irish ard)
- From Brythonic *abona 'river' (Welsh afon):
  - Avon (river), Gloucestershire/Wiltshire/Somerset
  - Avon (river), Wiltshire/Hampshire/Dorset
  - Avon (river), Northamptonshire/Warwickshire/Worcestershire/Gloucestershire
  - Avon or Aune (river), Devon
- From Celtic *iska 'water' (Irish uisce):
  - Axe (river), Devon/Dorset
  - Axe (river), Somerset
  - Axminster, Devon
  - Axmouth, Devon
- First element from Celtic *briga 'hill':
  - Brean, Somerset
  - Bredon, Worcestershire
  - Breedon on the Hill, Leicestershire
  - Brewood, Staffordshire
  - Brill, Buckinghamshire
- From Celtic *brigant- 'high, lofty, elevated' (or divine name, Brigantia):
  - Brent (river), Greater London
  - Brentford, Greater London
  - Bryn, Greater Manchester - from Welsh bryn, 'hill'.
- Burslem, Stoke-on-Trent, the -lem element is a Celtic district name from *lemano ("elm").
- Camulodunum (Latin), now Colchester, Essex - from *kamulos 'Camulus' (divine name) + Celtic *dūnon 'fortress'
- Catterick, North Riding of Yorks., *catu ("battle") + *ratis ("rampart") + onjon (suffix).

From *cem (root associated with cefn below) + *-*ed (suffix)

  - Chevet, West Riding of Yorkshire
  - Cheviot, Northumberland
- Chevin, Wharfedale, equivalent to Welsh cefn ("ridge").
- Crayke, North Riding of Yorkshire, equivalent to Welsh craig ("rock").
- From Brythonic *crüg 'hill' (Irish cruach)
  - Creech St Michael, Somerset
  - Crewkerne, Somerset
  - Crich, Derbyshire
  - Cricket St Thomas, Somerset
  - Crickheath, Shropshire
  - Cricklade, Wiltshire
- Crewe, Cheshire - from Old Welsh *criu 'river crossing'
- Cunececestre (Old English), now Chester-le-Street, County Durham, from Latin Concangis, from *cönig, a root of uncertain meaning.
- Devon, Latin Dumnonia - from tribal name Dumnonii or Dumnones, from Celtic *dumno- 'deep', 'world'
- From Celtic *dubr- 'water', *dubrās 'waters' (Welsh dwfr; Breton dour):
  - Dover, Kent, Latin Dubris
  - Andover, Hampshire
  - Wendover, Buckinghamshire
  - Dever (river), Hampshire
  - Deverill (river), Wiltshire
- Durham, County Durham, Latin Dunelm - first element is possibly dun, ' hill fort' (Welsh ddin, 'fort').
- First element from Celtic *duro- 'fort'; in Dūrobrīvae, Celtic *brīwa 'bridge':
  - Durobrivae (Latin), now Rochester, Kent and Water Newton, Cambridgeshire
  - Durovernum Cantiacorum (Latin), now Canterbury, Kent
- From Celtic *iska 'water' (Irish uisce); second element in Isca Dumnoniorum (Exeter) is a tribal name (see Devon):
  - Exe (river), Devon/Somerset
  - Nether Exe, Devon
  - Up Exe, Devon
  - Exebridge, Devon
  - Exford, Somerset
  - Exeter, Devon, Latin Isca Dumnoniorum
  - Exminster, Devon
  - Exmouth, Devon
  - Exton, Somerset
  - Exwick, Devon
  - Eskeleth, North Yorkshire
- Gloucester, Gloucestershire, from Latin Glevum (+ Old English ceaster), from *gleiwom ("bright place").
- Holland, Lincolnshire, possibly from haiw- ("a swamp") (+ OE land).
- From the equivalent of Welsh ynys ("island").
  - Ince, Cheshire
  - Ince Blundell, Sefton
  - Ince-in-Makerfield, Wigan
- Inskip, Lancashire, equivalent to ynys-cyb ("bowl-shaped island").
- Kesteven, Lincolnshire, from cēt- ("a wood") (+ Old Norse stefna ("a meeting place") added later).
- Leatherhead, Surrey - from Brythonic *lēd- [from Celtic *leito-] + *rïd- [from Celtic *(φ)ritu-] = "Grey Ford"
- Lincoln, Lincolnshire, Latin Lindum Colonia - from Celtic *lindo- 'pool' + Latin colonia 'colony'
- From Brittonic *mamm- 'breast'
  - Mamble, Worcestershire
  - Manchester, Latin Mamucium or Mancunium (referring to the shape of a hill)
  - Morville, Shropshire, Mamerfeld (c. 1138) (+ OE feld).
- Noviomagus (Latin), now Chichester, West Sussex and Crayford, Kent - from Celtic *nowijo- 'new' (Welsh newydd) + *magos 'field, plain'
- Onn, Staffordshire, from *onnā ("ash trees").
- From *panto- and its descendants (Welsh pant, Cumbric pant).
  - Pant, Austwick, West Riding of Yorkshire
  - Pant Foot, Ingleton, West Riding of Yorkshire
  - Pantend, Westmorland
  - Pauntley, Gloucestershire
  - Pont (river), Ponteland, Northumberland
- Pen y Ghent, Yorkshire - equivalent with Welsh pen-y-gant ("summit of the border") or pen-y-gynt ("summit of the heathen").
- Pengethley, Herefordshire - from Brythonic *penn- 'hill, top, head, chief' (Welsh pen) + possibly *kelli 'to stand' (Welsh gelli)
- From Brythonic *penn- 'hill, top, head, chief' (Welsh pen) + *koid- 'wood' (Welsh coed), or *cēd- 'wood':
  - Pencoyd, Herefordshire
  - Penge, Greater London
  - Penketh, Cheshire
- First element from Brittonic *penn- 'hill, top, head, chief' (Welsh pen 'head, end, chief, supreme') = Irish ceann 'head', from Proto-Celtic *k^{w}enno-:
  - Pencraig, Herefordshire
  - Pendlebury, Greater Manchester
  - Pendleton, Lancashire
  - Pendock, Worcestershire
  - Pensnett, West Midlands
  - Penn, Buckinghamshire
  - Penn, West Midlands
  - Lower Penn, Staffordshire
  - Penshaw, Sunderland
- Pen Bal Crag, Tynemouth, from pen ("head") + wāl ("wall") (+ English crag).
- Old Sarum, Wiltshire, Latin Sorviodūnum - second element from Celtic *dūnon 'fortress'
- Segedunum (Latin), now Wallsend, Tyne and Wear - from Celtic for 'victorious', 'strength' or 'dry' (theories). Second element is Celtic *dūnon 'fortress'.
- Sinodun Hills, south Oxfordshire - from Celtic *seno- 'old' + *dūnon 'fortress'
- Possibly from Celtic *tames- 'dark' (cf. Celtic *temeslos > Welsh tywyll 'darkness'):
  - Tamar (river), Devon/Cornwall
  - Tame (river), Greater Manchester
  - Tame (river), North Yorkshire
  - Tame (river), West Midlands
  - Team (river), Tyne and Wear
  - Teme (river), Welsh Tefeidiad, Wales/Shropshire/Worcestershire
  - Thames (river), Latin Tamesis
- Trinovantum (Latin), now London - 'Of the Trinovantes', a tribal name, perhaps 'very energetic people' from Celtic *tri- (intensive) + *now- 'energetic', related to *nowijo- 'new' (Welsh newydd)
- Verulamium (Latin), now St Albans, Hertfordshire - from Brittonic *weru- 'broad' + *lam- 'hand' [from Celtic *(φ)lāmā] (Welsh llaw, Irish láimh)
- Wigan, from *wīg ("Roman vicus") + ann (suffix).
- First element from Celtic *windo- 'white' (Welsh gwyn); in Vindolanda, Celtic *landā 'land, place' (Welsh llan). In Vindomora, second element could be 'sea' (Welsh môr, Irish muir):
  - Vindobala (Latin), Roman fort in Northumberland
  - Vindolanda (Latin), Roman fort in Northumberland
  - Vindomora (Latin), Roman fort in County Durham.
- Yeavering, Northumberland, formerly Gefrin, equivalent to Welsh gafrfryn ("goat hill").
- York, Greek Ebōrakon, Latin Eboracum or Eburacum - from Celtic *eburo- 'yew'

==== Scotland ====
The post-6th century AD Brittonic languages of Northern England and Scotland were Cumbric and Pictish. Cumbric place-names are found in Scotland south of the River Forth, while Pictish names are found to the north.

- Aberdeen, Aberdeenshire - from **aber ("river mouth").
- Applecross, Ross-shire - formerly Abercrosan, from aber ("river mouth").
- Arran - possibly equivalent to Middle Welsh aran ("high place").
- Aviemore, Inverness-shire - An Aghaidh Mhòr in Gaelic, possibly involving Brittonic *ag- ("a cleft").
- Ben Lomond, Stirlingshire - Lomond is equivalent to Welsh llumon ("beacon").
- Blantyre, Lanarkshire - equivalent to Welsh blaen ("extremes, source, front") + tir ("land").
- Blebo, Fife - formerly Bladebolg, from Brittonic *blawd ("meal") + *bolg ("sack").
- Burnturk, Fife - formerly Brenturk, equivalent to Welsh bryntwrch ("boar hill").
- Dallas, Moray - equivalent to Welsh dôl ("haugh, meadow") + gwas ("abode").
- Darnaway, Moray - possibly from ancient Brittonic Taranumagos ("thunder-plain").
- Daviot, Inverness-shire - perhaps from Brittonic *dem- meaning "sure, strong".
- Dull, Perthshire - equivalent to Welsh dôl ("haugh, meadow").
- Ecclefechan, Dumfriesshire - equivalent to Welsh eglwysfechan ("small church").
- Edinburgh, Midlothian - from Din Ediyn, from a Brittonic form meaning "fort of Ediyn" (cf. Welsh din).
- Esslemont, Aberdeenshire - equivalent to Welsh iselfynydd ("low hill").
- Glasgo, Aberdeenshire - see Glasgow, Lanarkshire below.
- Glasgow, Lanarkshire - equivalent to Welsh glascau ("blue hollow").
- Hebrides - Ebudes in Ptolemy (c. 140 AD), possibly from ancient Brittonic ep- ("a horse"; cf. Welsh ebol).
- Keith, Banffshire - equivalent to Welsh coed ("wood, forest").
- Lanark, Lanarkshire - equivalent to Welsh llanerch ("a glade").
- Landrick, Perthshire - see Lanark, Lanarkshire.
- Lanrick, Perthshire - see Lanark, Lanarkshire.
- Lauder, Berwickshire - equivalent either to Middle Breton louazr or Welsh llawedrawr.
- Lendrick, Kinross-shire - see Lanark, Lanarkshire.
- Lendrick, Perthshire - see Lanark, Lanarkshire.
- Lomond Hills, Fife - see Ben Lomond, Stirlingshire.
- Mayish, Arran - possibly from Brittonic maɣes ("field"; Welsh maes).
- Meggernie, Perthshire - from an element cognate with Welsh migwernydd ("boggy meadow").
- Methven, Perthshire - equivalent to Welsh meddfaen ("meadstone").
- Midmar, Aberdeenshire - equivalent to Welsh mig(n) ("bog, swamp") + Mar (a district name).
- Migvie, Aberdeenshire - equivalent to Welsh mig(n) ("bog, swamp").
- Mounth, Perthshire, Angus and Aberdeenshire - equivalent to Welsh mynydd ("mountain, moor, hill").
- Ochil Hills, Fife - probably from Common Brittonic *okelon ("a ridge").
- Orchy, Argyll (river) - in Gaelic Urchaidh, from ancient Brittonic are-cētia ("on the wood").
- Panbride, Angus - from pant ("a hollow").
- Panlathy, Angus - from pant ("a hollow").
- Panmure, Angus - equivalent to Welsh pantmawr ("big hollow").
- Pendewen, Angus - first element is possibly equivalent to Welsh pen ("head, top, summit, source").
- Penicuik, Midlothian - equivalent to Welsh pen-y-cog ("summit of the cuckoo").
- Pennan, Aberdeenshire - probably equivalent to Welsh pen ("head, top, summit, source").
- Pennygant Hill, Roxburghshire - see Pen y Ghent, Yorkshire, England.
- Perth, Perthshire - probably equivalent to Welsh perth ("bush").
- Pinderachy, Angus - first element is possibly equivalent to Welsh pen ("head, top, summit, source").
- Pinnel, Fife - possibly equivalent to Welsh pen ("head, top, summit, source").
- Pulrossie, Sutherland - possibly equivalent to Welsh pwllrhos ("promontory pool").
- Rattray, Aberdeenshire - equivalent to Welsh rhawdtref ("ramparts town").
- Urquhart, Ross-shire - formerly Airdchartdan, equivalent to Middle Welsh ar-cardden ("on the enclosure").
- Yell, Shetland - probably from Common Brittonic iâla ("unfruitful land, pasture").

==== Wales ====
The vast majority of placenames in Wales (part of the United Kingdom) are either Welsh or anglicized Welsh.

==== Cornwall ====
The vast majority of placenames in Cornwall are either Cornish or anglicized Cornish. For examples, see List of places in Cornwall.

==== Brittany ====
The vast majority of placenames in the west of Brittany (part of France) are either Breton or derived from Breton. For examples, see Category:Populated places in Brittany.

=== Goidelic ===
==== England ====
Place names in England derived partly or wholly from Goidelic languages include:

- Aireyholme, Yorkshire (Great Ayton), recorded as Erghum (1138), from Old Irish airgh ("summer pastures").
- Ben, Yorkshire (Sedbergh), probably from the Gaelic benn ("a peak").
- Cambois, Northumberland, possibly from Old Irish cambas ("bay, creek")
- Carkin, Yorkshire, possibly from Old Irish carric ("a rock").
- Castle Eden, County Durham, possibly from Old Irish étan ("forehead, hill-brow").
- †Crosskelloc, Lancashire (Ulverston), from Irish cros ("a cross") + Chelloc (personal name).
- Dunmallard, Cumberland, possibly from Middle Irish dùn-mallacht ("fort of curses")
- Durdar, Cumberland (St Cuthbert Without), from Gaelic doiredarach ("oak copse").
- Greysouthen, Cumberland, from Irish craicc-Suthan ("Suthán's rock/cliff").
- Kilmond, Yorkshire (Bowes), possibly from Gaelic ceann-monadh ("head of the hill").
- Knockupworth, Cumberland (Grinsdale), from Irish cnocc ("hillock") (+ the Germanic personal-name Hubert).
- Latrigg, Cumberland, possibly from Old Irish lettir ("a slope").
- Latterbarrow, Lancashire (Hawkshead), possibly from Irish lettir ("a slope").
- Liscard, Cheshire, possibly from Irish Gaelic lios na carraige meaning "fort of the rock".
- Noctorum, Cheshire, from Irish cnocc-tírim ("dry hill").
- Pool Darkin, Westmorland (Beetham), possibly from Gaelic poll ("pool") + the personal name *Dercan.
- Ravenglass, Cumberland, from Irish rann-Glas ("Glas's part/share").
- Torkin, Cumberland (Thursby), from Irish tor-cheann ("peak-head").

Furthermore, some non-Goidelic place-names in mainly Northern and Midland England reference Irish personal names, due to Norse-Gaelic settlement Britain during the 10th century.

- Carperby, Yorkshire containing the Irish Gaelic given-name Cairpe
- Dovenby, from personal name Dufan of Irish origin (OIr 'Dubhán')
- Dunkenhalgh, Lancashire (Hyndburn), from the Gaelic personal name Donnchad (> English Duncan) (+ Old English halh, "haugh").
- Fixby, Yorkshire, from the Gaelic Irish personal name Fiach
- Gatenby, Yorkshire, from the Irish personal name Gaithen (+ Old Norse byr, "farm").
- Glassonby, from the Irish personal name Glassan
- †Iocemhil, Lincolnshire (Killingholme), possibly contains the Irish personal name Eogan.
- Malmesbury, Wiltshire, from the Irish founder of the abbey Máel Dub
- Mellishaw, Lancashire (Lancaster), possibly the Irish personal name Mdeldn (+ Old Norse haugr).
- Melmerby, Yorkshire, from the Old Irish personal name Máel Muire
- Yockenthwaite, Yorkshire, contains the Irish personal name Eogan (+ Old Norse þveit, "clearing").

Place names that directly reference the Irish include Irby, Irby upon Humber, Ireby and Ireleth. Place names with Scot- or similar, such as Scothern in Lincolnshire or Scotton in the North Riding of Yorkshire, may refer to Gaelic speakers from Scotland or Ireland, since Old English Scottas originally had connotations of Irish Gaels.

==== Wales ====
- Llŷn, Caernarfonshire, from Laigin, an Irish ethnic name.
- Soch (river), Caernarfonshire, from Old Irish socc ("sow").

==== Normandy ====
A small number of place-names in Normandy, France are derived from Gaelic personal names. Such names are largely restricted to the Cotentin peninsula.

- Digulleville, La Manche, from Dicuil.
- Doncanville, La Manche, from Donchadh.
- Néhou, La Manche, from Niall.

==== Ireland ====
The vast majority of placenames in Ireland are anglicized Irish language names.

==== Scotland ====
The majority of placenames in the Highlands of Scotland (part of the United Kingdom) are either Scottish Gaelic or anglicized Scottish Gaelic. Gaelic-derived placenames are very common in the rest of mainland Scotland also. Pictish-derived placenames can be found in the northeast, while Brythonic-derived placenames can be found in the south.

==== Isle of Man ====
Many placenames on the Isle of Man (a Crown dependency) are Manx or anglicised Manx, although there are also many Norse-derived place names.

== See also ==
- Aber and Inver as place-name elements
- Celtic onomastics
- List of Celtic place names in Portugal
