= Nanteuil (disambiguation) =

Nanteuil is a commune in the Deux-Sèvres department in western France. It may also refer to:

== Places ==
- Nanteuil-le-Haudouin, a comune in the Oise a department in northern France
- Nanteuil, Vichel-Nanteuil, a village in a commune in the Aisne department in northern France

== People ==
- Nanteuil (actor), French playwright and actor
- Claire Julie de Nanteuil (1834-1897), French children's writer
