= Devlin (given name) =

Devlin is a given name.

People with name include:

- Devlin DeFrancesco (born 2000), Canadian-Italian auto racing driver
- Devlin Hodges (born 1996), American football quarterback
- Devlin Hope (born 1990), South African rugby union player
- Devlin MacKay (born 1997), Scottish football goalkeeper
- Devlin Robinson (fl. 2010s–2020s), Pennsylvania State Senate member

== See also ==
- Devlin (disambiguation)
- Devlin (surname)
