= Laféline =

- Commune
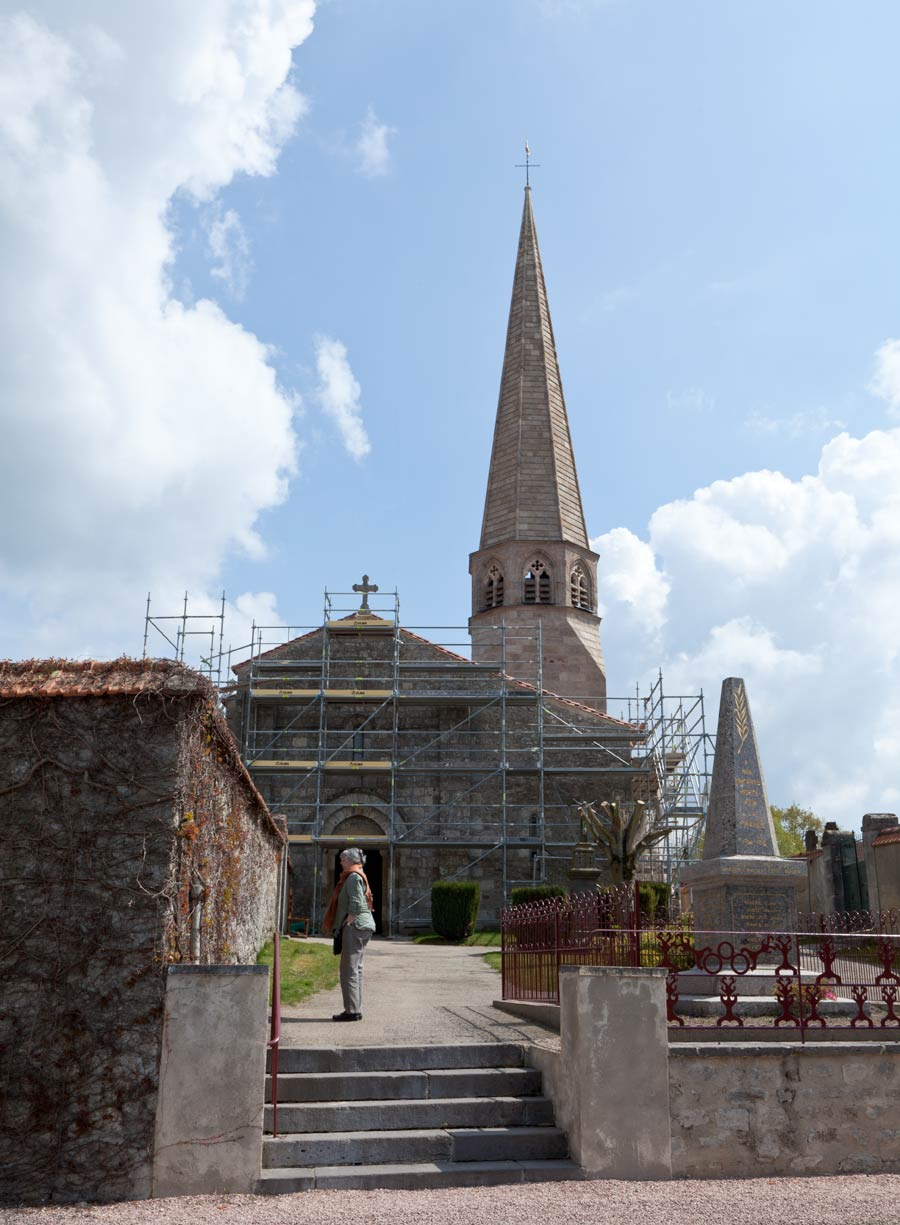
- The church in Laféline
- Location of Laféline
- Location within France Location within Auvergne-Rhône-Alpes
- Coordinates: 46°21′00″N 3°10′09″E
- Country: France
- Region: Auvergne-Rhône-Alpes
- Department: Allier
- Arrondissement: Vichy
- Canton: Souvigny
- Intercommunality: Saint-Pourçain Sioule Limagne

Government
  - Mayor (2026–32): Julien Boulanger
- Area^{1}: 23.1 km^{2} (8.9 sq mi)
- Elevation: 418 m (1,371 ft)
- Highest elevation: 426 m (1,398 ft)
- Lowest elevation: 295 m (968 ft)
- Population (2023): 173
  - Density: 7.49/km^{2} (19.4/sq mi)
- Time zone: UTC+01:00 (CET)
  - Summer (DST): UTC+02:00 (CEST)
- INSEE/Postal code: 03134 /03500
- ^{1} French Land Register data, which excludes lakes, ponds, glaciers > 1 km^{2} (0.386 sq mi or 247 acres) and river estuaries.

Laféline (French pronunciation: [lafelin]; Occitan: La Felina) is a commune in the Allier department in central France.

== Population ==
Historical population
Year	Pop.	±% p.a.
1968	339	—
1975	308	−1.36%
1982	226	−4.33%
1990	178	−2.94%
1999	173	−0.32%
2007	191	+1.24%
2012	200	+0.93%
2017	197	−0.30%
2023	173	−2.14%
Source: INSEE

== See also ==
- Communes of the Allier department
