= Nouvion (disambiguation) =

Nouvion is a commune of the Somme department in France.

Nouvion is also part of the name of several communes in France:

- Nouvion-et-Catillon, in the Aisne department
- Nouvion-le-Comte, in the Aisne department
- Nouvion-le-Vineux, in the Aisne department
- Nouvion-sur-Meuse, in the Ardennes department
- Le Nouvion-en-Thiérache, in the Aisne department

Nouvion is a French family:

- André-Pierre Nouvion, French lawyer and historian of French law
- Laurent Nouvion, Monegasque politician and attorney
