= Verneuil =

Verneuil may refer to:

== Places in France ==
- Verneuil, former municipality, now merged with Moussy-Verneuil, Aisne department
- Verneuil, Charente, in the Charente department
- Verneuil, Cher, in the Cher department
- Verneuil, Marne, in the Marne department
- Verneuil, Nièvre, in the Nièvre department
- Verneuil-en-Bourbonnais, in the Allier department
- Verneuil-en-Halatte, in the Oise department
- Verneuil-Grand, in the Meuse department
- Verneuil-le-Château, in the Indre-et-Loire department
- Verneuil-l'Étang, in the Seine-et-Marne department
- Verneuil-Moustiers, in the Haute-Vienne department
- Verneuil-Petit, in the Meuse department
- Verneuil-sous-Coucy, in the Aisne department
- Verneuil-sur-Avre, in the Eure department
- Verneuil-sur-Igneraie, in the Indre department
- Verneuil-sur-Indre, in the Indre-et-Loire department
- Verneuil-sur-Seine, in the Yvelines department
- Verneuil-sur-Serre, in the Aisne department
- Verneuil-sur-Vienne, in the Haute-Vienne department

== People ==
- Aristide Auguste Stanislas Verneuil (1823–1895), French physician and surgeon
- Auguste Victor Louis Verneuil (1856–1913), French chemist
- Henri Verneuil (1920–2002), French-Armenian playwright and filmmaker
- Louis Verneuil (1893–1952), French writer and actor
- Maurice Pillard Verneuil (1869–1942), French designer

== History ==
- Verneuil method or Verneuil process, by which artificial gemstones are grown
- Battle of Verneuil, an English victory in the Hundred Years' War
- Marquisate de Verneuil, created in 1600 in Verneuil-en-Halatte
- Duchy-Peerage of Verneuil, created in 1652, also in Verneuil-en-Halatte
