= Bransat =

- Commune
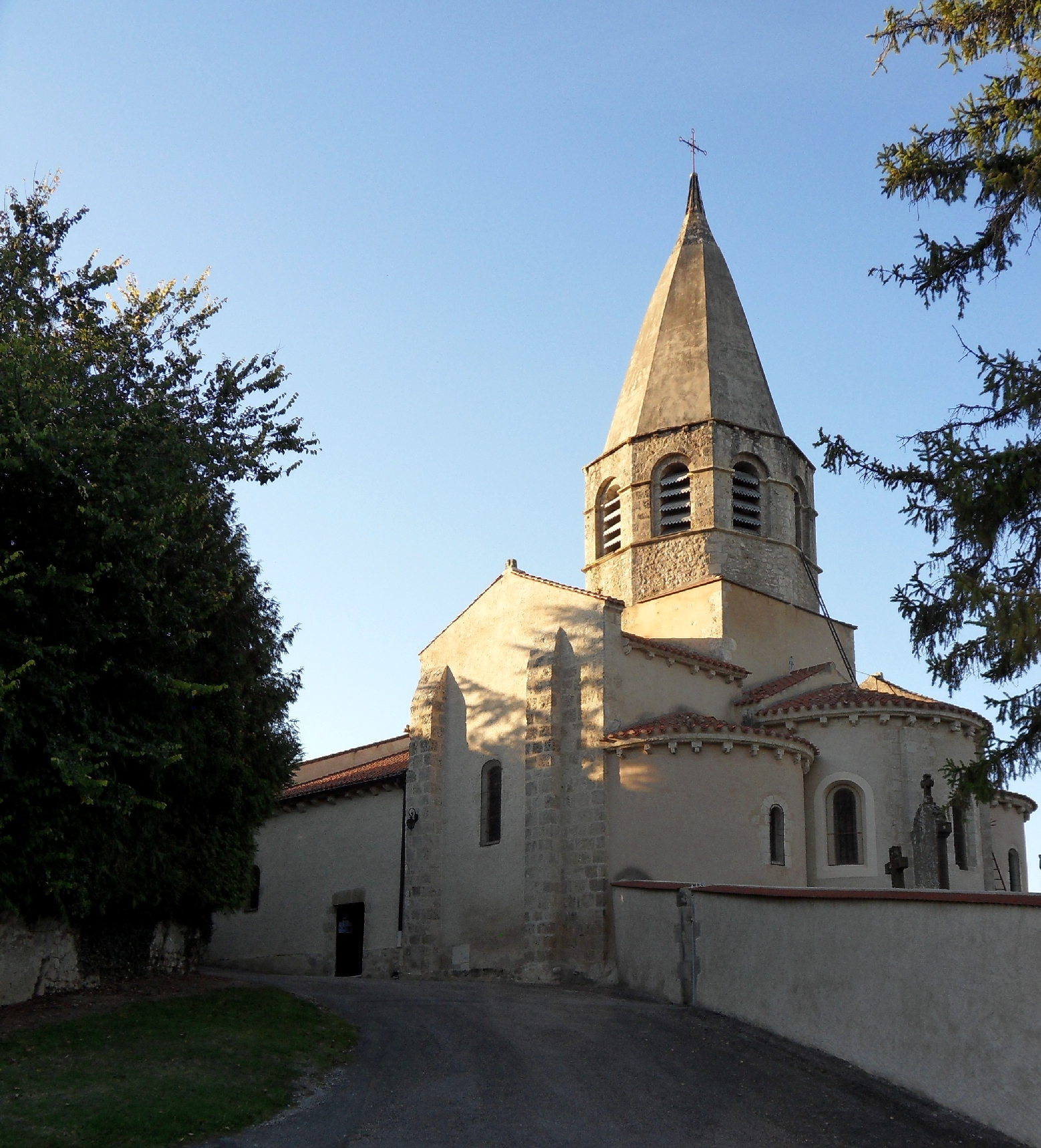
- The church in Bransat

- Coat of arms
- Location of Bransat
- Location within France Location within Auvergne-Rhône-Alpes
- Coordinates: 46°19′45″N 3°13′52″E
- Country: France
- Region: Auvergne-Rhône-Alpes
- Department: Allier
- Arrondissement: Vichy
- Canton: Souvigny

Government
  - Mayor (2026–32): Sylvain Petit-Jean
- Area^{1}: 15.52 km^{2} (5.99 sq mi)
- Elevation: 340 m (1,120 ft)
- Highest elevation: 401 m (1,316 ft)
- Lowest elevation: 254 m (833 ft)
- Population (2023): 530
  - Density: 34/km^{2} (88/sq mi)
- Time zone: UTC+01:00 (CET)
  - Summer (DST): UTC+02:00 (CEST)
- INSEE/Postal code: 03038 /03500
- ^{1} French Land Register data, which excludes lakes, ponds, glaciers > 1 km^{2} (0.386 sq mi or 247 acres) and river estuaries.

Bransat (French pronunciation: [bʁɑ̃sa]) is a commune in the Allier department in central France.

== Population ==
Historical population
Year	Pop.	±% p.a.
1968	571	—
1975	532	−1.01%
1982	536	+0.11%
1990	484	−1.27%
1999	508	+0.54%
2007	511	+0.07%
2012	488	−0.92%
2017	512	+0.96%
2023	530	+0.58%
Source: INSEE

== See also ==
- Communes of the Allier department
