= Bresnay =

- Commune
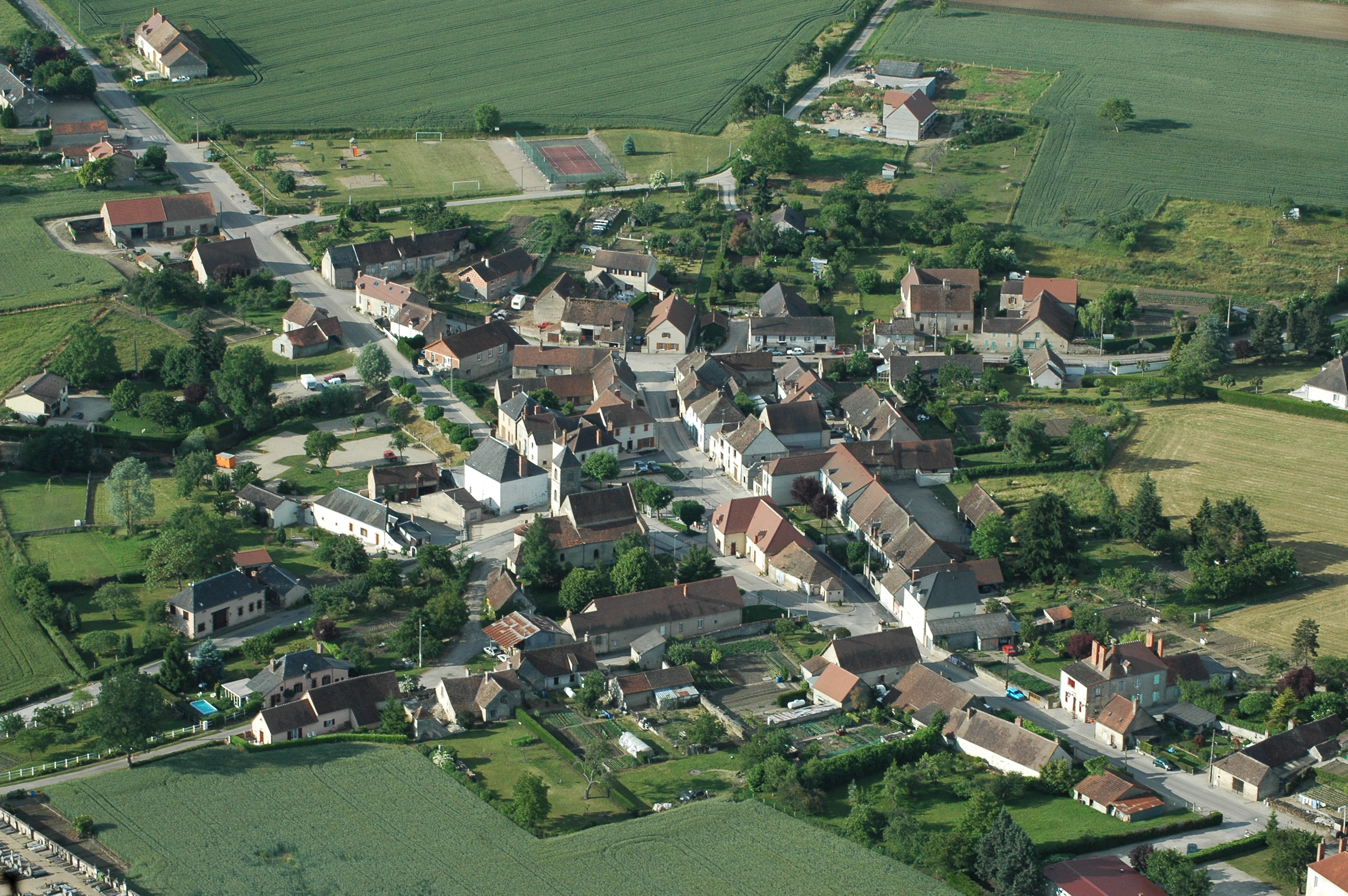
- An aerial view of Bresnay

- Coat of arms
- Location of Bresnay
- Location within France Location within Auvergne-Rhône-Alpes
- Coordinates: 46°26′34″N 3°15′01″E
- Country: France
- Region: Auvergne-Rhône-Alpes
- Department: Allier
- Arrondissement: Moulins
- Canton: Souvigny
- Intercommunality: CA Moulins Communauté

Government
  - Mayor (2026–32): Alain Chervier
- Area^{1}: 23.13 km^{2} (8.93 sq mi)
- Elevation: 247 m (810 ft)
- Highest elevation: 357 m (1,171 ft)
- Lowest elevation: 235 m (771 ft)
- Population (2023): 386
  - Density: 16.7/km^{2} (43.2/sq mi)
- Time zone: UTC+01:00 (CET)
  - Summer (DST): UTC+02:00 (CEST)
- INSEE/Postal code: 03039 /03210
- ^{1} French Land Register data, which excludes lakes, ponds, glaciers > 1 km^{2} (0.386 sq mi or 247 acres) and river estuaries.

Bresnay (French pronunciation: [bʁɛnɛ]) is a commune in the Allier department in central France.

== Population ==
Historical population
| Year | Pop. | ±% p.a. |
|---|---|---|
| 1968 | 465 | — |
| 1975 | 395 | −2.30% |
| 1982 | 407 | +0.43% |
| 1990 | 395 | −0.37% |
| 1999 | 376 | −0.55% |
| 2007 | 392 | +0.52% |
| 2012 | 383 | −0.46% |
| 2017 | 383 | +0.00% |
| 2023 | 386 | +0.13% |
Source: INSEE

== See also ==
- Communes of the Allier department
