= Chemilly, Allier =

Chemilly
- Commune
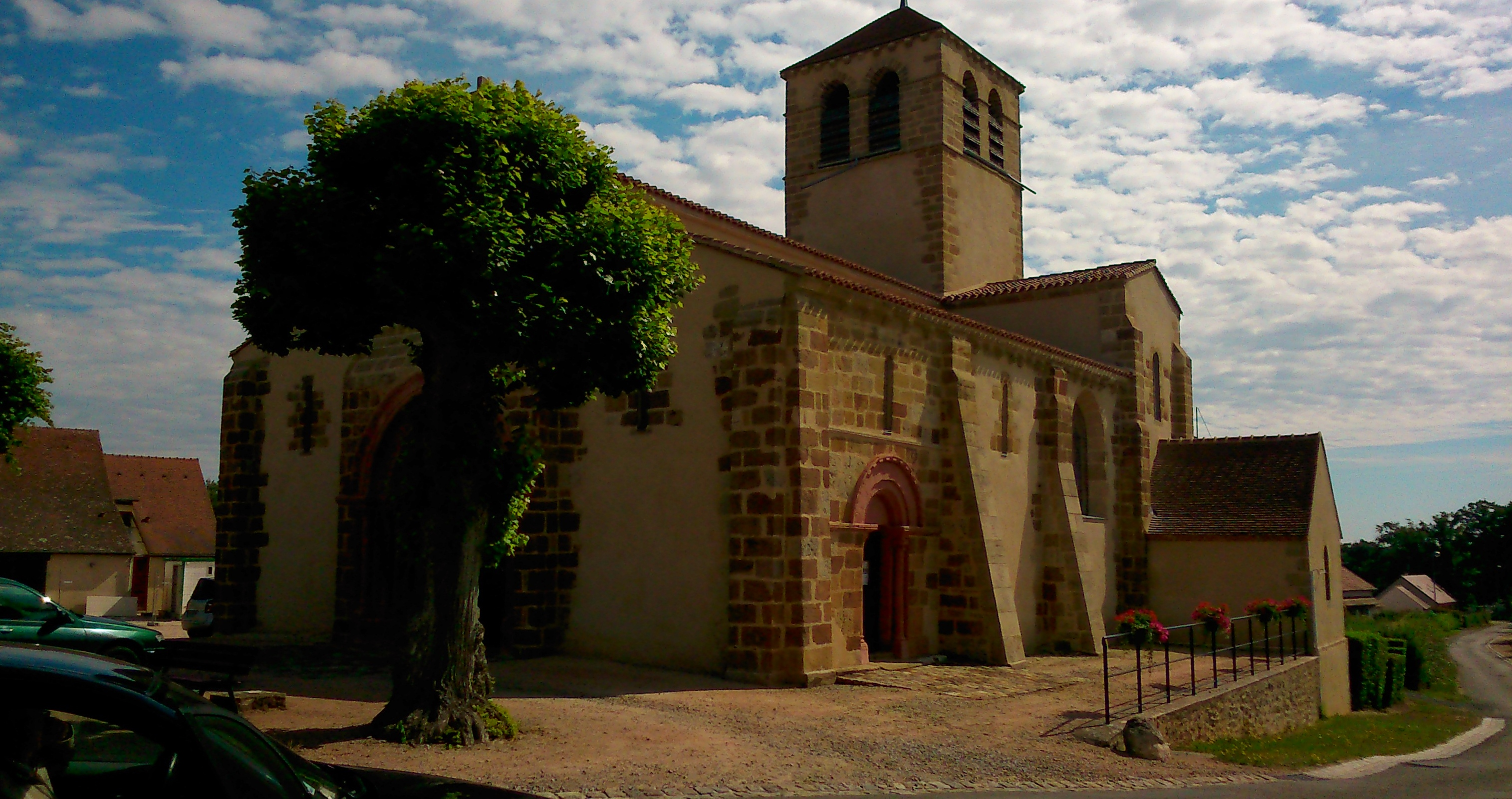
- The church in Chemilly
- Location of Chemilly
- Location within France Location within Auvergne-Rhône-Alpes
- Coordinates: 46°29′20″N 3°18′56″E
- Country: France
- Region: Auvergne-Rhône-Alpes
- Department: Allier
- Arrondissement: Moulins
- Canton: Souvigny
- Intercommunality: CA Moulins Communauté

Government
  - Mayor (2026–32): Claire Cabanel
- Area^{1}: 16.94 km^{2} (6.54 sq mi)
- Elevation: 212 m (696 ft)
- Highest elevation: 276 m (906 ft)
- Lowest elevation: 206 m (676 ft)
- Population (2023): 580
  - Density: 34/km^{2} (89/sq mi)
- Time zone: UTC+01:00 (CET)
  - Summer (DST): UTC+02:00 (CEST)
- INSEE/Postal code: 03073 /03210
- ^{1} French Land Register data, which excludes lakes, ponds, glaciers > 1 km^{2} (0.386 sq mi or 247 acres) and river estuaries.

Chemilly (French pronunciation: [ʃəmiji]) is a commune in the Allier department in central France.

== Population ==
Historical population
| Year | Pop. | ±% p.a. |
|---|---|---|
| 1968 | 427 | — |
| 1975 | 405 | −0.75% |
| 1982 | 496 | +2.94% |
| 1990 | 608 | +2.58% |
| 1999 | 561 | −0.89% |
| 2007 | 630 | +1.46% |
| 2012 | 626 | −0.13% |
| 2017 | 639 | +0.41% |
| 2023 | 580 | −1.60% |
Source: INSEE

== See also ==
- Communes of the Allier department
