= Marigny, Allier =

Marigny
- Commune
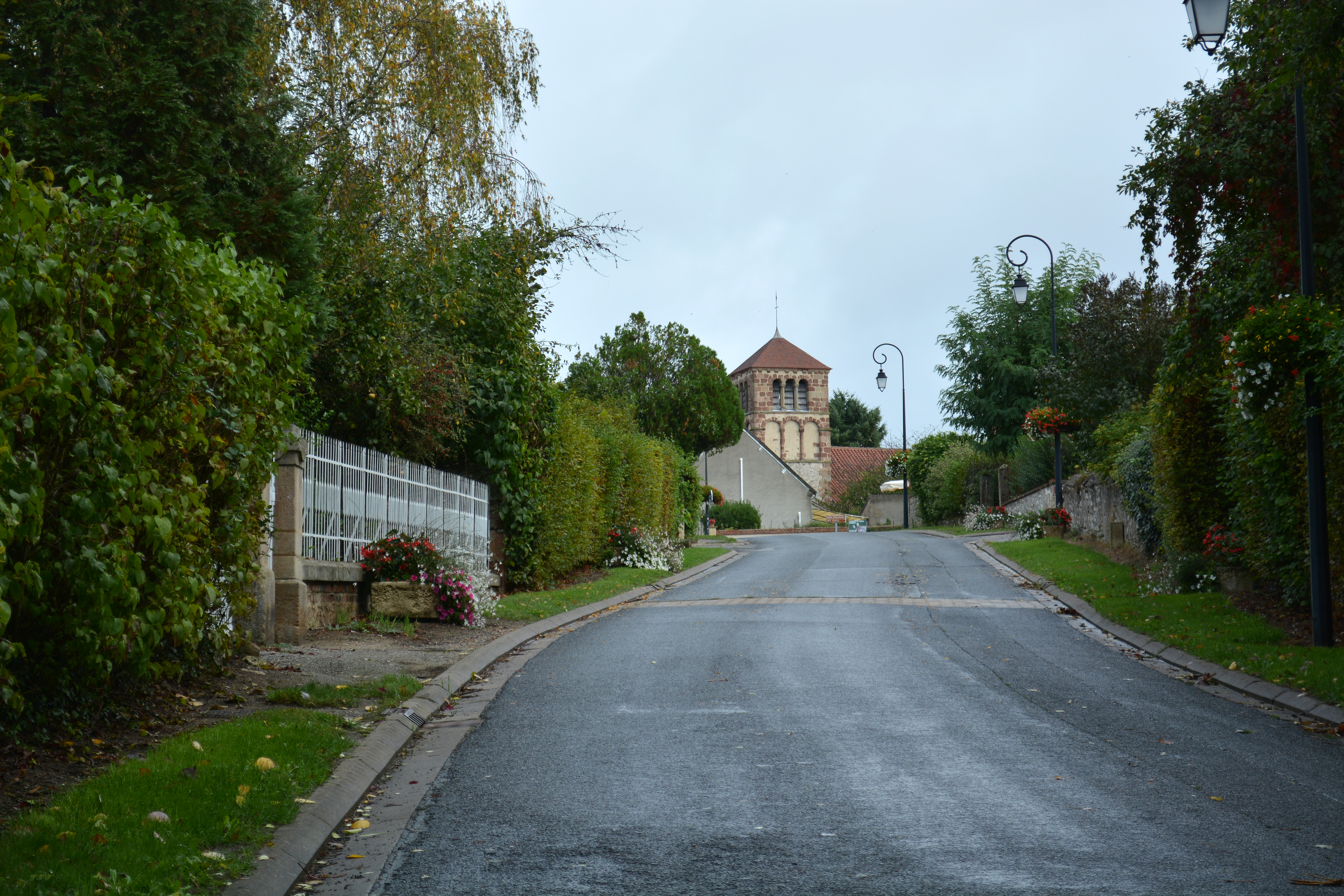
- The road into Marigny
- Location of Marigny
- Location within France Location within Auvergne-Rhône-Alpes
- Coordinates: 46°34′57″N 3°12′33″E
- Country: France
- Region: Auvergne-Rhône-Alpes
- Department: Allier
- Arrondissement: Moulins
- Canton: Souvigny
- Intercommunality: CA Moulins Communauté

Government
  - Mayor (2026–32): Philippe Prugneau
- Area^{1}: 17.24 km^{2} (6.66 sq mi)
- Highest elevation: 274 m (899 ft)
- Lowest elevation: 217 m (712 ft)
- Population (2023): 200
  - Density: 12/km^{2} (30/sq mi)
- Time zone: UTC+01:00 (CET)
  - Summer (DST): UTC+02:00 (CEST)
- INSEE/Postal code: 03162 /03210
- ^{1} French Land Register data, which excludes lakes, ponds, glaciers > 1 km^{2} (0.386 sq mi or 247 acres) and river estuaries.

Marigny (French pronunciation: [maʁiɲi]) is a commune in the Allier department in central France.

== Population ==
Historical population
Year	Pop.	±% p.a.
1968	215	—
1975	179	−2.58%
1982	197	+1.38%
1990	221	+1.45%
1999	204	−0.89%
2007	189	−0.95%
2012	191	+0.21%
2017	204	+1.33%
2023	200	−0.33%
Source: INSEE

== See also ==
- Communes of the Allier department
