= Cesset =

- Commune
- Location of Cesset
- Location within France Location within Auvergne-Rhône-Alpes
- Coordinates: 46°18′17″N 3°12′30″E
- Country: France
- Region: Auvergne-Rhône-Alpes
- Department: Allier
- Arrondissement: Vichy
- Canton: Souvigny
- Intercommunality: Saint-Pourçain Sioule Limagne

Government
  - Mayor (2026–32): Jimmy Trindade
- Area^{1}: 12.19 km^{2} (4.71 sq mi)
- Elevation: 327 m (1,073 ft)
- Highest elevation: 399 m (1,309 ft)
- Lowest elevation: 269 m (883 ft)
- Population (2023): 430
  - Density: 35/km^{2} (91/sq mi)
- Time zone: UTC+01:00 (CET)
  - Summer (DST): UTC+02:00 (CEST)
- INSEE/Postal code: 03049 /03500
- ^{1} French Land Register data, which excludes lakes, ponds, glaciers > 1 km^{2} (0.386 sq mi or 247 acres) and river estuaries.

Cesset (French pronunciation: [sesɛ]; Occitan: Sessiat) is a commune in the Allier department in central France.

== Population ==
Historical population
| Year | Pop. | ±% p.a. |
|---|---|---|
| 1968 | 332 | — |
| 1975 | 337 | +0.21% |
| 1982 | 321 | −0.69% |
| 1990 | 292 | −1.18% |
| 1999 | 353 | +2.13% |
| 2007 | 368 | +0.52% |
| 2012 | 387 | +1.01% |
| 2017 | 416 | +1.46% |
| 2023 | 430 | +0.55% |
Source: INSEE

== See also ==
- Communes of the Allier department
