= Le Theil, Allier =

Le Theil
- Commune
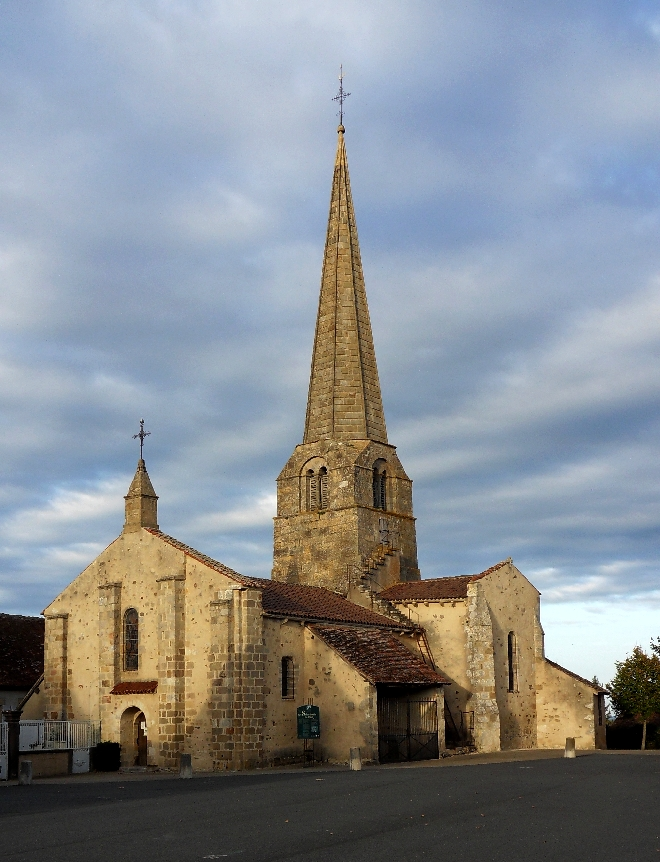
- The church in Le Theil

- Coat of arms
- Location of Le Theil
- Location within France Location within Auvergne-Rhône-Alpes
- Coordinates: 46°21′20″N 3°08′06″E
- Country: France
- Region: Auvergne-Rhône-Alpes
- Department: Allier
- Arrondissement: Vichy
- Canton: Souvigny
- Intercommunality: Saint-Pourçain Sioule Limagne

Government
  - Mayor (2026–32): Benoît Simonin
- Area^{1}: 28.92 km^{2} (11.17 sq mi)
- Elevation: 477 m (1,565 ft)
- Highest elevation: 463 m (1,519 ft)
- Lowest elevation: 334 m (1,096 ft)
- Population (2023): 387
  - Density: 13.4/km^{2} (34.7/sq mi)
- Time zone: UTC+01:00 (CET)
  - Summer (DST): UTC+02:00 (CEST)
- INSEE/Postal code: 03281 /03240
- ^{1} French Land Register data, which excludes lakes, ponds, glaciers > 1 km^{2} (0.386 sq mi or 247 acres) and river estuaries.

Le Theil (French pronunciation: [lə tɛj]; Occitan: Lo Telh) is a commune in the Allier department in Auvergne-Rhône-Alpes in central France.

== Population ==
Historical population
Year	Pop.	±% p.a.
1968	679	—
1975	590	−1.99%
1982	503	−2.25%
1990	456	−1.22%
1999	413	−1.09%
2007	400	−0.40%
2012	405	+0.25%
2017	404	−0.05%
2023	387	−0.71%
Source: INSEE

== See also ==
- Communes of the Allier department
