= Contigny =

- Commune
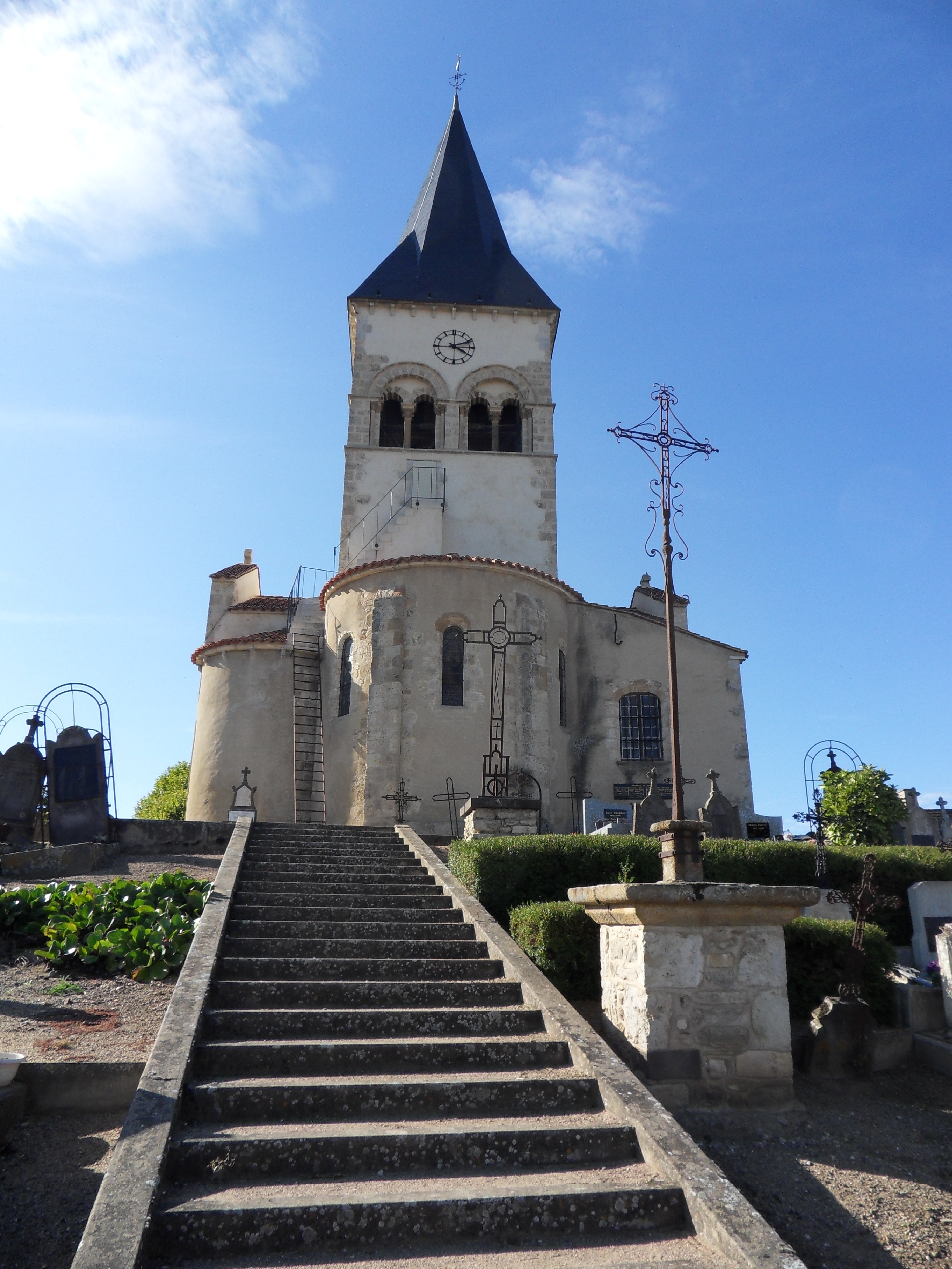
- The church in Contigny
- Location of Contigny
- Location within France Location within Auvergne-Rhône-Alpes
- Coordinates: 46°21′13″N 3°18′18″E
- Country: France
- Region: Auvergne-Rhône-Alpes
- Department: Allier
- Arrondissement: Vichy
- Canton: Souvigny
- Intercommunality: Saint-Pourçain Sioule Limagne

Government
  - Mayor (2026–32): Valéry Dubsay
- Area^{1}: 17.93 km^{2} (6.92 sq mi)
- Elevation: 231 m (758 ft)
- Highest elevation: 307 m (1,007 ft)
- Lowest elevation: 221 m (725 ft)
- Population (2023): 573
  - Density: 32.0/km^{2} (82.8/sq mi)
- Time zone: UTC+01:00 (CET)
  - Summer (DST): UTC+02:00 (CEST)
- INSEE/Postal code: 03083 /03500
- ^{1} French Land Register data, which excludes lakes, ponds, glaciers > 1 km^{2} (0.386 sq mi or 247 acres) and river estuaries.

Contigny (French pronunciation: [kɔ̃tiɲi]) is a commune in the Allier department in central France.

== Population ==
Historical population
Year	Pop.	±% p.a.
1968	630	—
1975	574	−1.32%
1982	533	−1.05%
1990	542	+0.21%
1999	559	+0.34%
2007	598	+0.85%
2012	617	+0.63%
2017	592	−0.82%
2023	573	−0.54%
Source: INSEE

== See also ==
- Communes of the Allier department
