= Monétay-sur-Allier =

- Commune
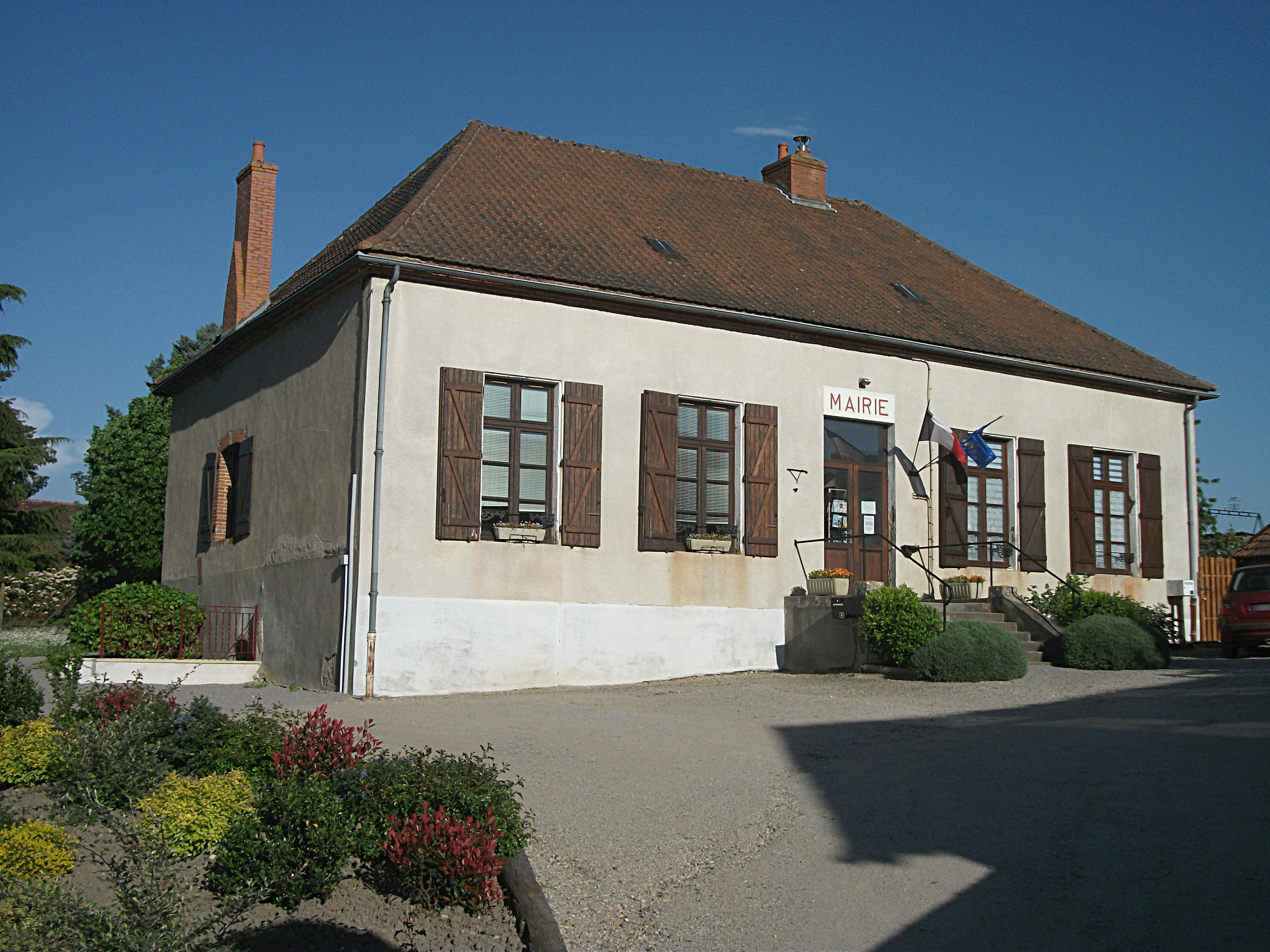
- Town hall

- Coat of arms
- Location of Monétay-sur-Allier
- Location within France Location within Auvergne-Rhône-Alpes
- Coordinates: 46°22′54″N 3°18′12″E
- Country: France
- Region: Auvergne-Rhône-Alpes
- Department: Allier
- Arrondissement: Vichy
- Canton: Souvigny
- Intercommunality: Saint-Pourçain Sioule Limagne

Government
  - Mayor (2026–32): René Beylot
- Area^{1}: 11.77 km^{2} (4.54 sq mi)
- Elevation: 297 m (974 ft)
- Highest elevation: 311 m (1,020 ft)
- Lowest elevation: 217 m (712 ft)
- Population (2023): 536
  - Density: 45.5/km^{2} (118/sq mi)
- Time zone: UTC+01:00 (CET)
  - Summer (DST): UTC+02:00 (CEST)
- INSEE/Postal code: 03176 /03500
- ^{1} French Land Register data, which excludes lakes, ponds, glaciers > 1 km^{2} (0.386 sq mi or 247 acres) and river estuaries.

Monétay-sur-Allier (French pronunciation: [mɔnetɛ syʁ alje], literally Monétay on Allier) is a commune in the Allier department in central France.

== Population ==
Historical population
Year	Pop.	±% p.a.
1968	409	—
1975	362	−1.73%
1982	403	+1.54%
1990	393	−0.31%
1999	461	+1.79%
2007	539	+1.97%
2012	512	−1.02%
2017	524	+0.46%
2023	536	+0.38%
Source: INSEE

== See also ==
- Communes of the Allier department
