= Segedunum =

Roman fort in Tyne and Wear, England

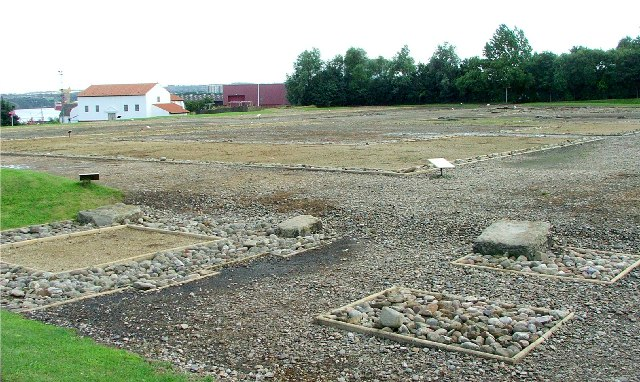
- Segedunum Roman Fort

- Location within Tyne and Wear
- 54.98791°N 1.53231°W
- Location: Wallsend, Tyne and Wear, England

History
- Founded: c. 122 AD
- Abandoned: c. 400 AD

Site notes
- Website: www.northeastmuseums.org.uk/segedunum

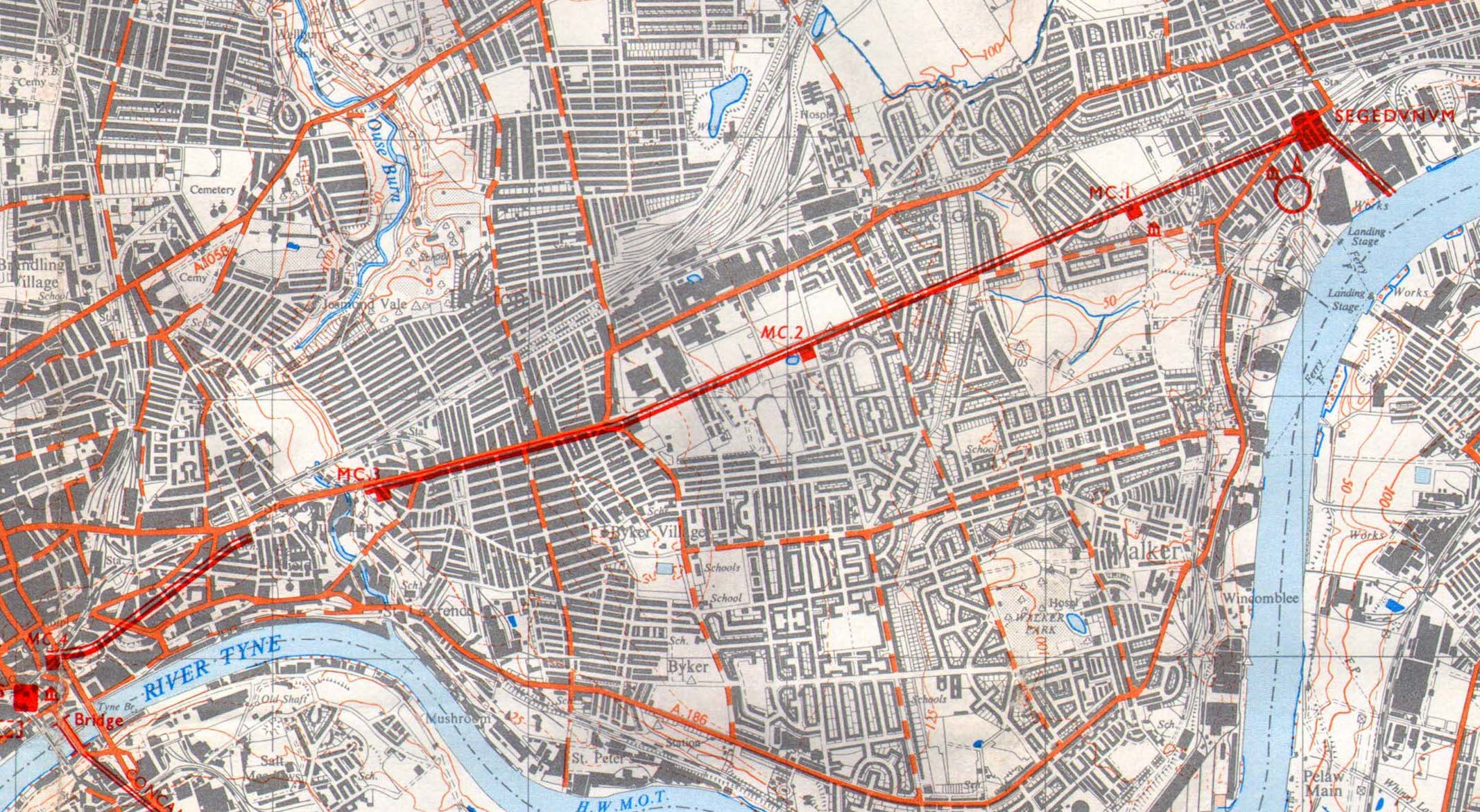
Wallsend fort at top right (1964 OS map). Hadrian’s Wall is delineated by its milecastles, e.g. MC 1 and MC 2

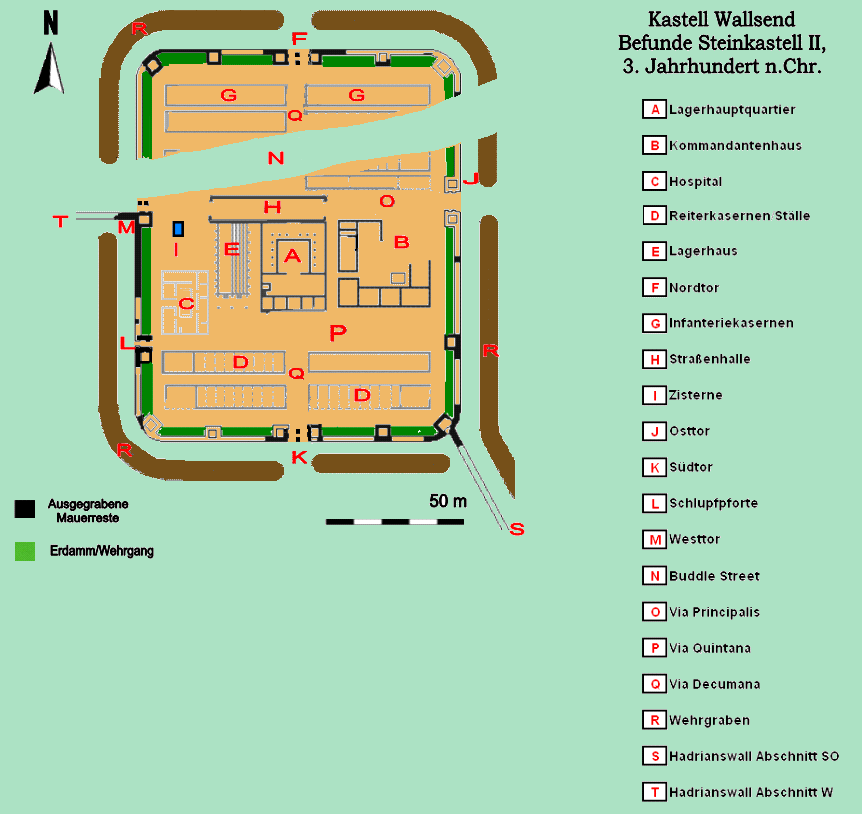
Wallsend fort plan (3rd century)

Segedunum was a Roman fort at modern-day Wallsend, North Tyneside in North East England. The fort lay at the eastern end of Hadrian's Wall near the banks of the River Tyne. It was in use for approximately 300 years from around 122 AD to almost 400. Today Segedunum is the most thoroughly excavated fort along Hadrian's Wall, and is operated as Segedunum Roman Fort, Baths and Museum. It forms part of the Hadrian's Wall UNESCO World Heritage Site.

== Etymology ==
Five places named Segedunum are known to have existed in the Roman empire, one each in Britain and Germany and three in Gaul.

The name Segedunum is known from the Notitia Dignitatum of the 4th century, but there is no consensus on its meaning. The various conjectures include "derived from the Celtic for 'powerful' or 'victorious'", "derived from the [Celtic] words sego ('strength') and dunum ('fortified place')", "Romano-British Segedunum 'Strong-fort'", and "Celtic sechdun or 'dry hill'".

The first element of the name is attested widely in Gaul, Spain, Germany and Italy, and derives from the Indo-European root segh-, which is reflected in various later European languages with similar meanings: Irish seg-, segh- 'strength, vigour', Welsh hy 'daring, bold', German Sieg 'victory', and so on. As applied to place names, it appears to have had the meaning of "place of strength" or "place of victory". The second element, -dunum, is a Celtic term widely attested across Britain and Gaul and typically meant a fort. Thus Segedunum probably had the meaning of "strong fort" or "victory fort".

== History ==
The Roman wall originally terminated at the fort of Pons Aelius (Newcastle upon Tyne) begun in 122 AD. Subsequently, in about 127 AD, the wall was extended further east by 4 mi (6 km), possibly to protect the river crossing at Pons Aelius, passing through present-day Byker to the new fort of Segedunum. The new section of wall was narrower than those previously built, being 7 feet 6 inches (2.29 m) wide on a foundation of 8 feet (2.4 m). Unlike the rest of the wall, the extension had no Vallum ditch and embankment on the south side. It was probably not needed here because its role was performed by the River Tyne.

The fort of Segedunum measured 453 feet (138 m) from north to south and 393 feet (120 m) from east to west, covering an area of 4.1 acres (17,000 m^{2}). A wide ditch and an earth embankment surrounded the fort on all sides. It had four double gates with the east, west and north gates opening outside the wall and only the south gate opening within the wall. The wall joined to the west wall of the fort just south of the west gate. From the southeast angle of the fort, a 6 feet 6 inches (2 m) wide wall ran down to the riverbank and extended at least as far as the low water level.

There is evidence that there was an extensive vicus, or village surrounding the fort, including the area to the north of the wall.

== Garrison ==
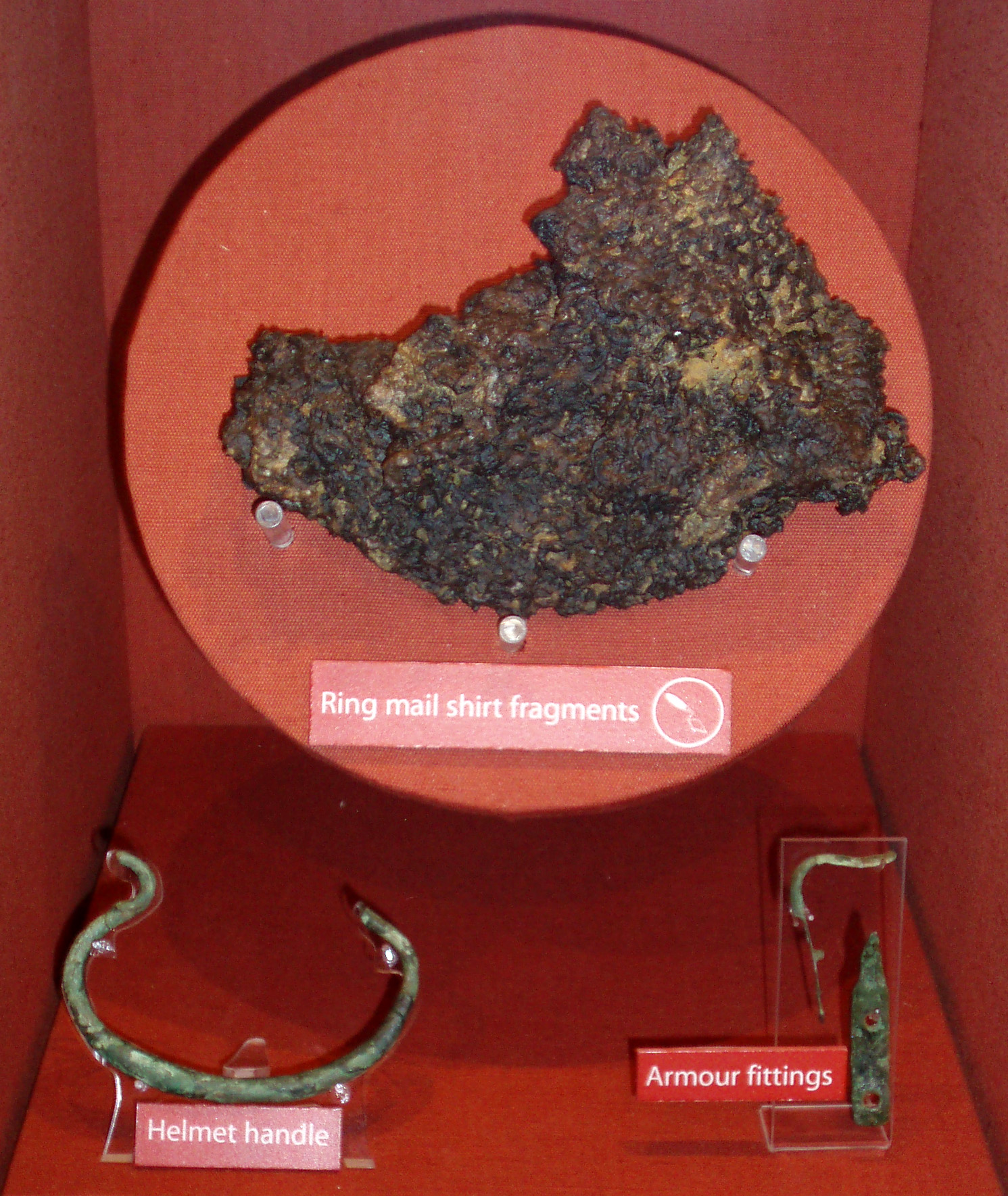
Fragments of armour found at Segedunum

The original garrison of Segedunum is unknown, but in the 2nd century Cohors II Nerviorum was stationed there. In the 3rd and 4th centuries the part-mounted Fourth Cohort of the Lingones occupied the fort, as recorded in the Notitia Dignitatum. Both units were 600 strong, consisting of 120 cavalry and 480 infantry.

== Subsequent history ==
Sometime round about 400 AD the fort was abandoned. For centuries the area remained as open farmland, but in the 18th century, collieries were sunk near the fort and the area gradually became a populous pit village. Eventually, in 1884, the whole fort disappeared under terraced housing.

In 1929 some excavations were carried out which recorded the outline of the fort. The local authority marked out this outline in white paving stones. In the 1970s the terraced houses covering the site were demolished. The singer Sting (musician) grew up in one of the demolished houses.

A section of Hadrian's Wall was excavated and a reconstruction built in the early 1990s. The Segedunum project began in January 1997 with a series of excavations in and around the Fort, as well as the construction of the bath house and the conversion of former Swan Hunter shipyard buildings to house the new museum. Segedunum Roman Fort, Baths & Museum opened to the public in June 2000.

== Today ==
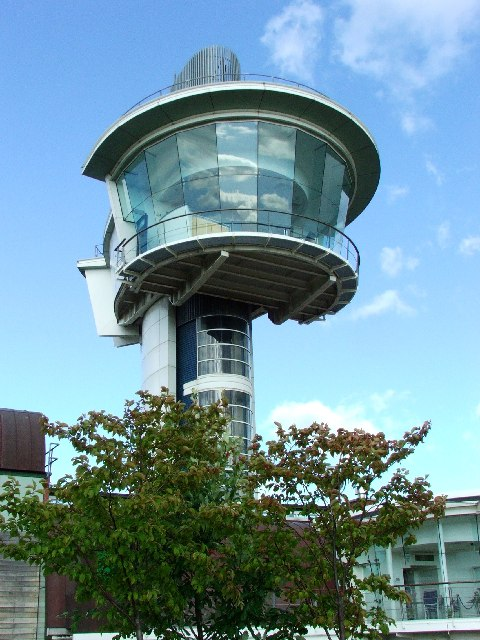
The viewing platform at the Segedunum Visitor Centre

The site of the fort now contains the excavated remains of the buildings' foundation of the original fort, as well as a reconstructed Roman military bathhouse based on excavated examples at Vindolanda and Chesters forts. A museum contains items of interest that were found when the site was excavated, and a large observation tower overlooks the site. A portion of the original wall is visible across the street from the museum, and a reconstruction of what the whole wall might have looked like. The central section of Hadrian's Wall was erected atop the Whin Sill, a geological formation that offers a natural topographic defence against invaders or immigrants from the north. However at the eastern end of the wall, the main topographic defence was the River Tyne itself, and the very final stretch of the wall ran down from Segedunum fort to the river's edge. There may have been a statue or monument to mark the very end of the wall, but if there ever was, it no longer exists.

North Tyneside Council provided accommodation in the newly built Battle Hill Estate for the owners of all the houses demolished when the site was cleared. The name Wallsend comes from Segedunum being at the easternmost end of Hadrian's Wall; the westernmost end is at Bowness-on-Solway.

== See also ==
- Arbeia
- Stanegate
