= Arausio (god) =

Celtic god

Arausio was a local Celtic god who was venerated in the settlement of Arausio in southern Gaul, now Orange in southern France.
