= Verneuil-en-Bourbonnais =

- Commune
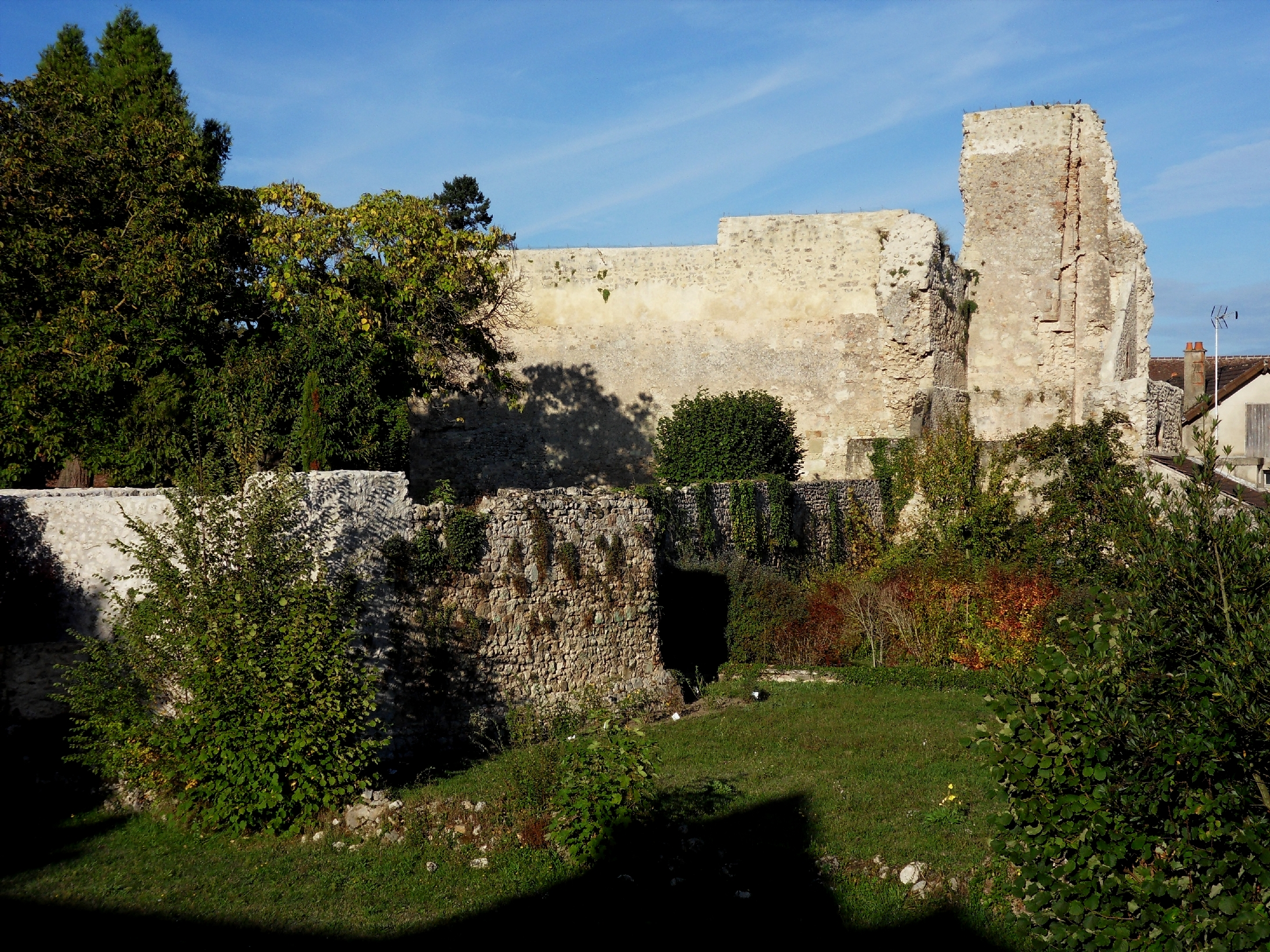
- Ruins of the chateau

- Coat of arms
- Location of Verneuil-en-Bourbonnais
- Location within France Location within Auvergne-Rhône-Alpes
- Coordinates: 46°20′51″N 3°15′09″E
- Country: France
- Region: Auvergne-Rhône-Alpes
- Department: Allier
- Arrondissement: Vichy
- Canton: Souvigny
- Intercommunality: Saint-Pourçain Sioule Limagne

Government
  - Mayor (2026–32): Daniel Leger
- Area^{1}: 14.14 km^{2} (5.46 sq mi)
- Highest elevation: 356 m (1,168 ft)
- Lowest elevation: 234 m (768 ft)
- Population (2023): 239
  - Density: 16.9/km^{2} (43.8/sq mi)
- Time zone: UTC+01:00 (CET)
  - Summer (DST): UTC+02:00 (CEST)
- INSEE/Postal code: 03307 /03500
- ^{1} French Land Register data, which excludes lakes, ponds, glaciers > 1 km^{2} (0.386 sq mi or 247 acres) and river estuaries.

Verneuil-en-Bourbonnais (French pronunciation: [vɛʁnœj ɑ̃ buʁbɔnɛ]; Occitan: Vernuelh en Borbonés) is a commune in the Allier department in Auvergne-Rhône-Alpes in central France.

== Population ==
Historical population
Year	Pop.	±% p.a.
1968	329	—
1975	290	−1.79%
1982	250	−2.10%
1990	280	+1.43%
1999	283	+0.12%
2007	249	−1.59%
2012	249	+0.00%
2017	244	−0.40%
2023	239	−0.34%
Source: INSEE

== See also ==
- Communes of the Allier department
