= Charenton =

Charenton is the name or part of the name of several places:

== France ==
- Charenton-le-Pont, in the Val-de-Marne département, a commune which has a common border with Paris
- Saint-Maurice, Val-de-Marne, a neighboring commune that was called Charenton-Saint-Maurice until 1842
  - Charenton (asylum)
- Charenton-du-Cher, in the Cher département
- Rue de Charenton, a street in Paris

== United States ==
- Charenton, Louisiana
