= Devlin =

Devlin may refer to:

- Devlin (surname)
- Devlin (given name)
- Devlin (rapper), a British rapper
- Devlin (TV series), a 1974 animated TV series by Hanna-Barbera
- Devlin, a 1988 novel by Roderick Thorp
- The Devil and Max Devlin, a 1981 American film starring Elliott Gould and Bill Cosby
- Devlin, a character in Harold Pinter's 1996 play Ashes to Ashes
- Devlin (album), a compilation album by American guitarist Tony Rice, released in 1987
- Devlin (Lord)
