= Nans =

Nans may refer to:

- Nans (worm), a genus of polychaete worms in the family Lopadorrhynchidae

It is the name or part of the name of several communes in France:

- Nans, Doubs
- Les Nans, Jura
- Nans-les-Pins, Var
- Nans-sous-Sainte-Anne, Doubs

"Nans" and the four-letter acronym NANS can also refer to:

- N-acetylneuraminic acid synthase
- NaN, a particular value of a numeric data type which is undefined as a number
- North American Neuromodulation Society
- National Association of Neighborhood Schools

== See also ==
- Nan (disambiguation)
