= Cahon =

- Commune
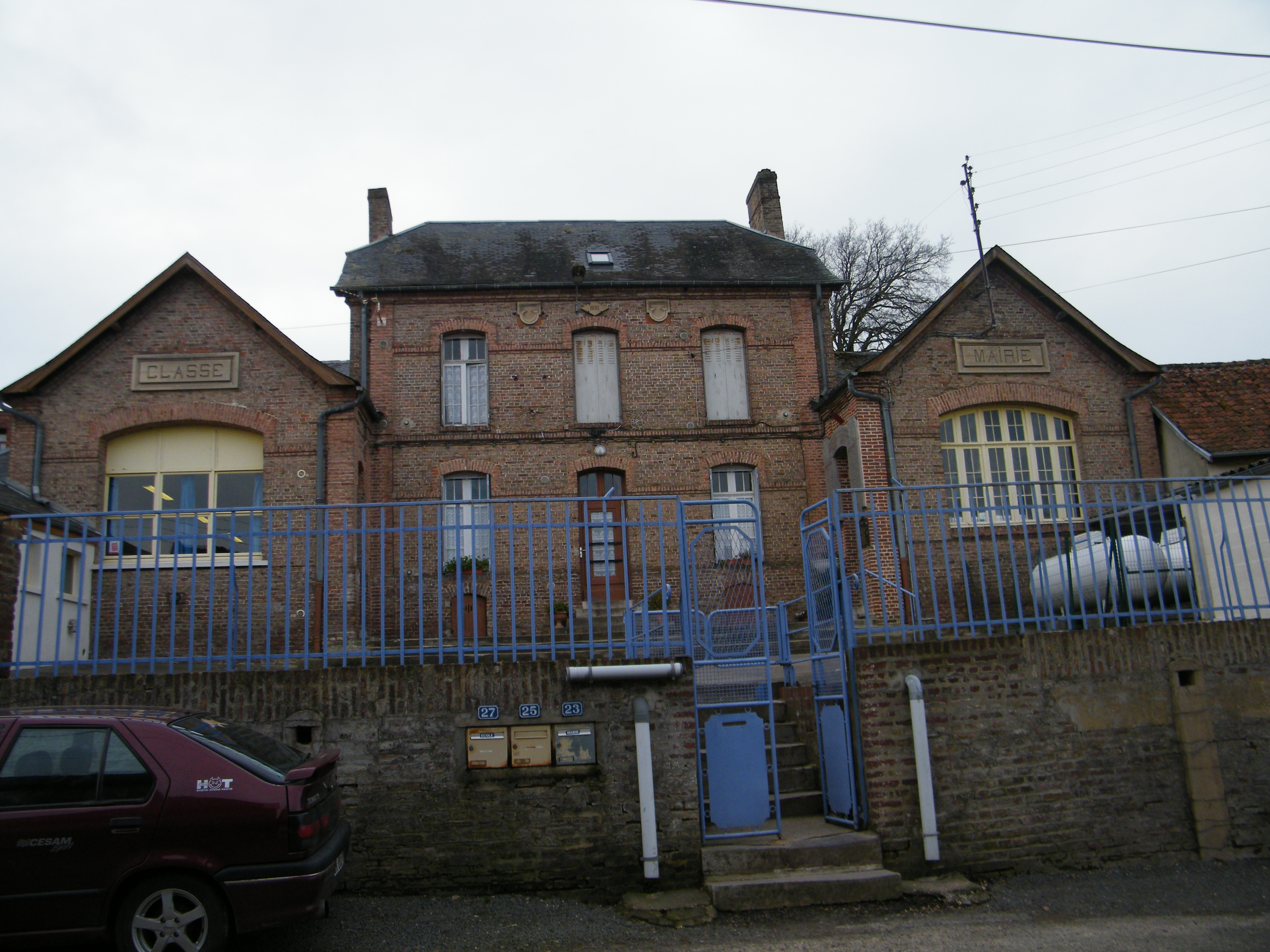
- The town hall and school in Cahon

- Coat of arms
- Location of Cahon
- Location within France Location within Hauts-de-France
- Coordinates: 50°07′13″N 1°43′27″E
- Country: France
- Region: Hauts-de-France
- Department: Somme
- Arrondissement: Abbeville
- Canton: Abbeville-2
- Intercommunality: CC Vimeu

Government
  - Mayor (2020–2026): Yves Hautefeuille
- Area^{1}: 7.04 km^{2} (2.72 sq mi)
- Elevation: 16 m (52 ft)
- Highest elevation: 69 m (226 ft)
- Lowest elevation: 3 m (9.8 ft)
- Population (2023): 222
  - Density: 31.5/km^{2} (81.7/sq mi)
- Time zone: UTC+01:00 (CET)
  - Summer (DST): UTC+02:00 (CEST)
- INSEE/Postal code: 80161 /80132
- ^{1} French Land Register data, which excludes lakes, ponds, glaciers > 1 km^{2} (0.386 sq mi or 247 acres) and river estuaries.

Cahon (French pronunciation: [kaɔ̃]) is a commune in the Somme department in Hauts-de-France in northern France.

== Geography ==
Cahon is situated on the D108 road, some 5 miles (8 km) west of Abbeville.

== Population ==
Historical population
| Year | Pop. | ±% p.a. |
|---|---|---|
| 1968 | 227 | — |
| 1975 | 213 | −0.91% |
| 1982 | 208 | −0.34% |
| 1990 | 212 | +0.24% |
| 1999 | 224 | +0.61% |
| 2007 | 209 | −0.86% |
| 2012 | 221 | +1.12% |
| 2017 | 199 | −2.08% |
| 2023 | 222 | +1.84% |
Source: INSEE

== See also ==
- Communes of the Somme department
