= Nanteuil (actor) =

French playwright and actor

Nanteuil, real name Denis Clerselier (c.1650 – after 1702), was a French playwright and actor.

== Short biography ==
Nanteuil was born in the region of Meaux, perhaps at Nanteuil-lès-Meaux, which would explain his pseudonym. His parents were Denis Clerselier, audiencier at the Grand Châtelet in Paris, and Jeanne Parafillar. His supposed uncle, the editor Claude Clerselier, published Descartes's works.

Nanteuil made his debut in 1667 and was a member of Nicolas de Neufville de Villeroy's troupe in Marseille. He performed in The Hague and Brussels between 1668 and 1672, as well as in Hanover from 1671 to 1673. He returned to France between 1682 and 1698 and played in Dijon, Bordeaux, Montauban, Strasbourg, Metz, Marseille, Lyon and Tours. In 1685, he had a theatre built in Angoulême.

His presence is still documented in Warsaw in 1699, then in Grenoble in 1702, after which his location is unknown.

Besides his acting qualities Nanteuil also wrote some plays, at times using crude vocabulary:

- Le Comte de Rocquefœuilles ou le Docteur extravagant (The Hague 1669)
- Les Brouilleries nocturnes(English: Night-time Confusions) (Brussels 1669)
- Le Campagnard dupé (Hanover 1671)
- L'Amour sentinelle(English: Love on Watch) (The Hague 1672)
- La Fille vice-roy (Hanover 1672)
- L'Amante invisible (English: The Invisible Lover) (Hanover 1673)
- L'Héritier imaginaire (English: The Imaginary Heir) (Hanover 1674).

He is also attributed a lost play, La Prise de Brunswic.
He published his works in Germany and at the Hague. He was profoundly influenced by Molière's comedies.
