= Vion, Sarthe =

Vion
- Commune
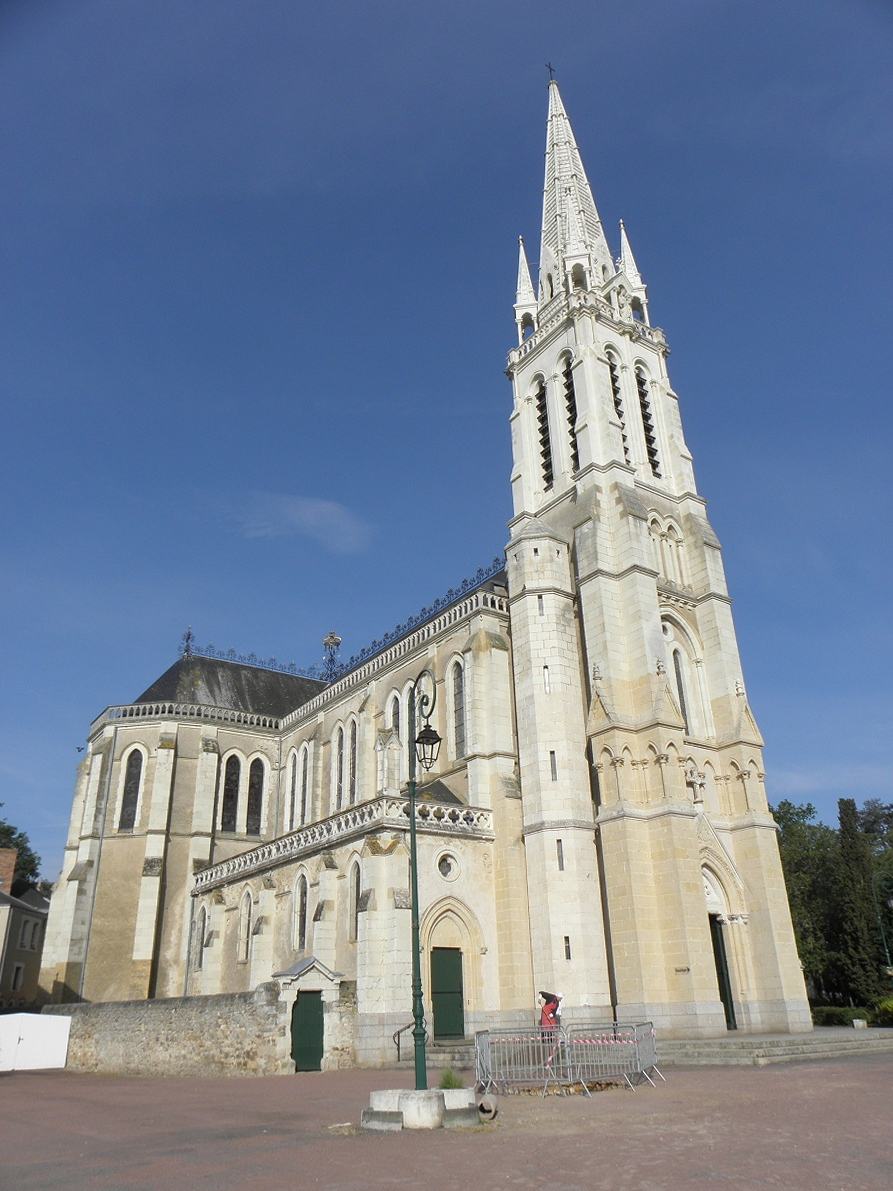
- The chapel of Notre-Dame-du-Chêne, in Vion
- Location of Vion
- Location within France Location within Pays de la Loire
- Coordinates: 47°49′05″N 0°14′16″W
- Country: France
- Region: Pays de la Loire
- Department: Sarthe
- Arrondissement: La Flèche
- Canton: Sablé-sur-Sarthe
- Intercommunality: CC Pays Sabolien

Government
  - Mayor (2020–2026): Brigitte Tétu-Édin
- Area^{1}: 20.04 km^{2} (7.74 sq mi)
- Highest elevation: 70 m (230 ft)
- Lowest elevation: 40 m (130 ft)
- Population (2023): 1,366
  - Density: 68.16/km^{2} (176.5/sq mi)
- Demonym(s): Vionnais, Vionnaise
- Time zone: UTC+01:00 (CET)
  - Summer (DST): UTC+02:00 (CEST)
- INSEE/Postal code: 72378 /72300
- ^{1} French Land Register data, which excludes lakes, ponds, glaciers > 1 km^{2} (0.386 sq mi or 247 acres) and river estuaries.

Vion (French pronunciation: [vjɔ̃]) is a commune in the Sarthe department in the region of Pays de la Loire in north-western France.

== See also ==
- Communes of the Sarthe department
