= Chambors =

- Commune
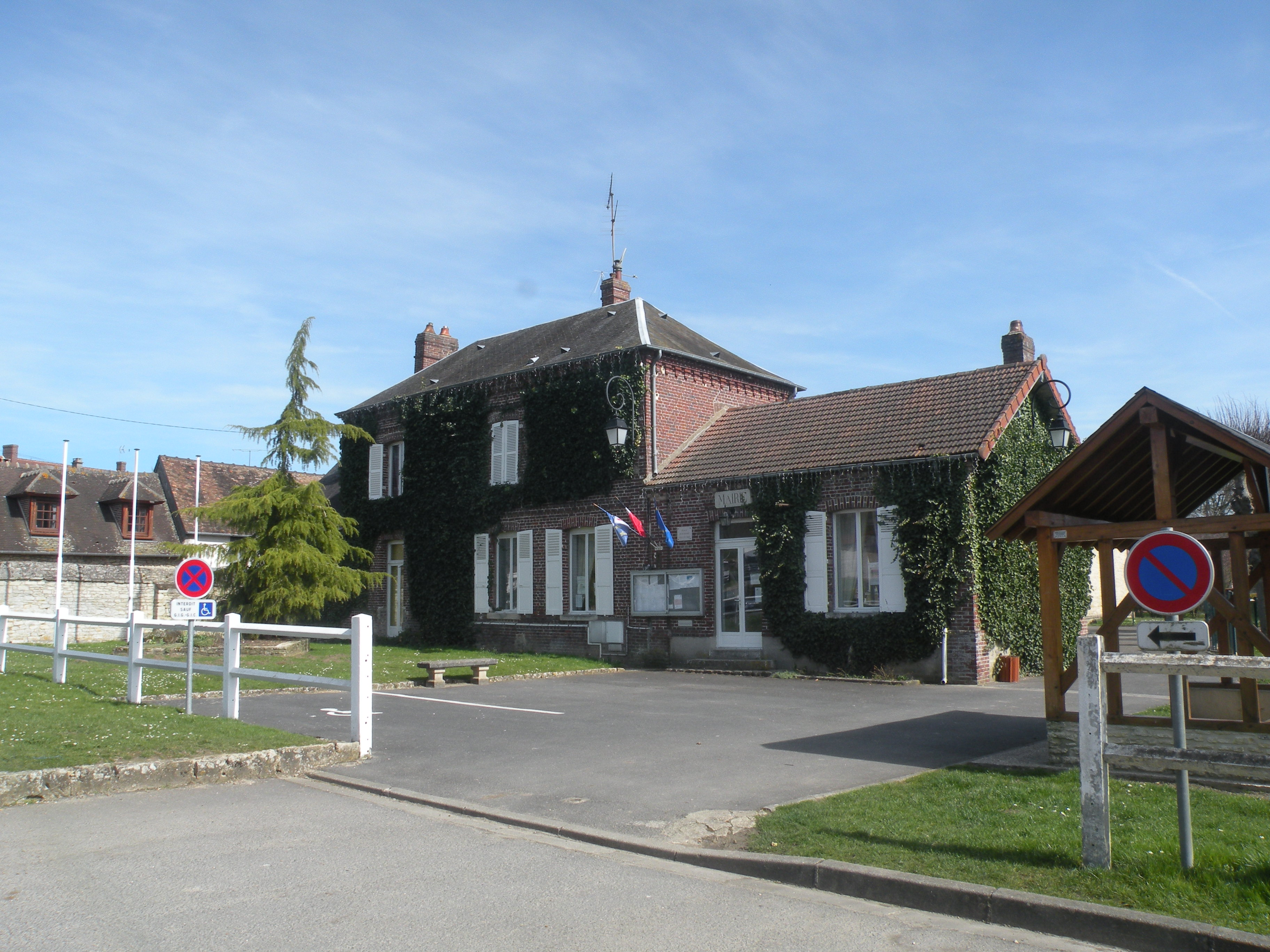
- The town hall of Chambors
- Location of Chambors
- Location within France Location within Hauts-de-France
- Coordinates: 49°15′41″N 1°49′01″E
- Country: France
- Region: Hauts-de-France
- Department: Oise
- Arrondissement: Beauvais
- Canton: Chaumont-en-Vexin
- Intercommunality: Vexin Thelle

Government
  - Mayor (2020–2026): Didier Gougibus
- Area^{1}: 6.65 km^{2} (2.57 sq mi)
- Elevation: 128 m (420 ft)
- Highest elevation: 146 m (479 ft)
- Lowest elevation: 55 m (180 ft)
- Population (2023): 300
  - Density: 45/km^{2} (120/sq mi)
- Time zone: UTC+01:00 (CET)
  - Summer (DST): UTC+02:00 (CEST)
- INSEE/Postal code: 60140 /60240
- ^{1} French Land Register data, which excludes lakes, ponds, glaciers > 1 km^{2} (0.386 sq mi or 247 acres) and river estuaries.

Chambors (French pronunciation: [ʃɑ̃bɔʁ]) is a commune in the Oise department in northern France.

== See also ==
- Communes of the Oise department
