= André-Pierre Nouvion =

French lawyer and historian

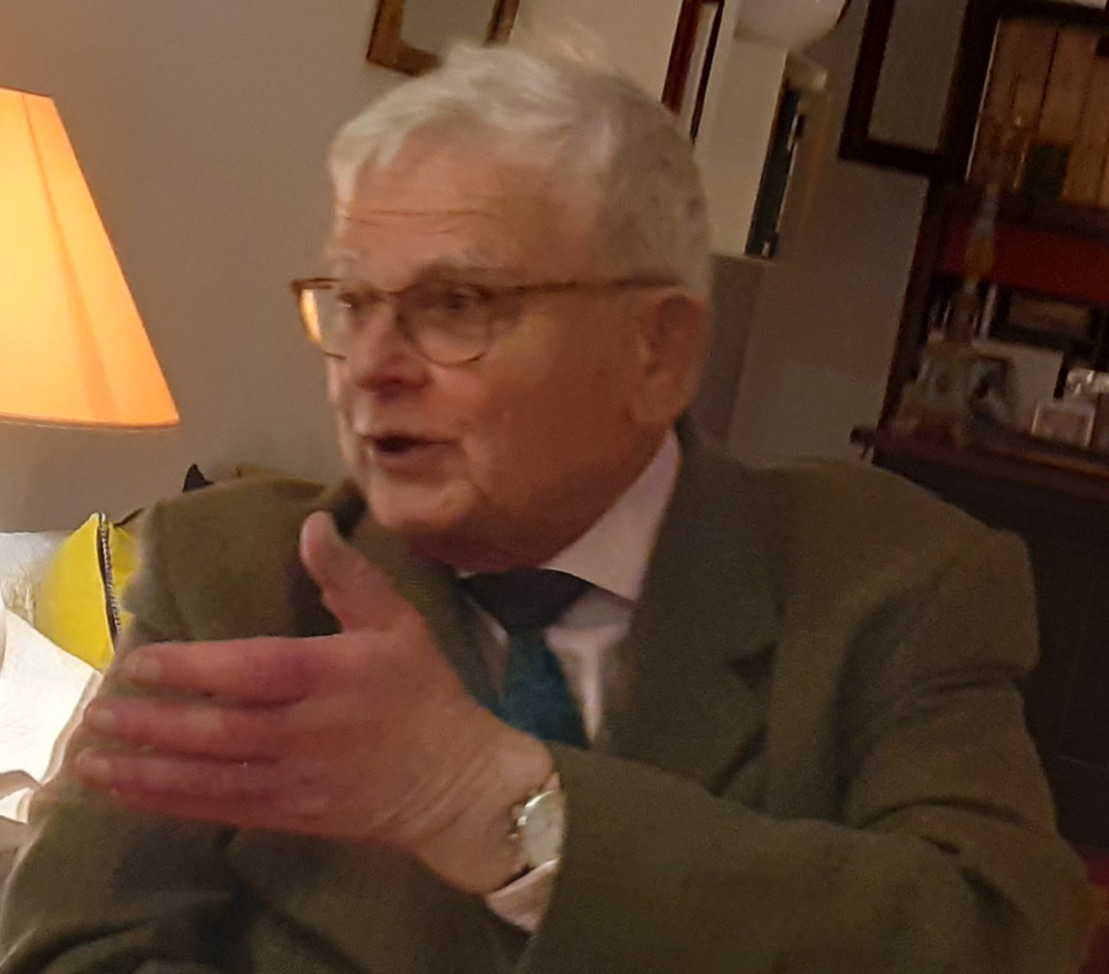
- André-Pierre Nouvion in 2021
- Born: 10 January 1939 (age 87)
- Occupation: Lawyer

André-Pierre Nouvion (born 1939) is a French lawyer and historian of French law.

== Biography ==
Educated with the Assumptionists, André-Pierre Nouvion holds a Doctorate in Public Law and Political Science (Panthéon-Assas University). His career has been devoted to the promotion and study of French consular institutions. A former director of the Paris Île-de-France Regional Chamber of Commerce and Industry, he has defended the French CCI model, both in France and internationally. In particular, he was appointed by the United Nations to visit the cambodian authorities in 1995, then Mexican in 1998. His research influenced the work of the parliamentary committees preparing the 2010 reform of consular networks.

In 1992, he was awarded the Prix d'histoire consulaire by the Assemblée des Chambres Françaises de Commerce et d'Industrie for his book L'institution des Chambres de commerce : pouvoirs et contrepoids published by Librairie générale de droit et de jurisprudence. He was an auditor at the Institut des hautes études de défense nationale, and for more than twenty years wrote the section on consular establishments in the Dalloz encyclopaedia.

== Political involvement ==
He became politically active at a very early age, joining the Union des jeunes pour le progrès (UJP). Alongside other members of the UJP, he manned the offices of René Capitant and Charles Pasqua's Groupe Rassemblement pour la République (at 21, rue Cujas in Paris) during the demonstrations of May 1968.

== Publications ==
- Une histoire immédiate des Chambres de commerce, Droit, Pratique de l'Institution Consulaire : 1982–2012 Des accords "Netter" aux lois de refondation – Paris, 2013 – ISBN 9782951436893
- Pratique et droit des Chambres de commerce et d'industrie françaises, Lexique raisonné – vol.3 : Réforme 2010 – Paris, 2011 – ISBN 978-1447563303
- Trois familles en Périgord-Limousin dans la tourmente de la Révolution et de L'Empire : Nouvion, Besse-Soutet-Dupuy et Chassériau – Paris, 2007 – ISBN 9782914741460
- Chambres de commerce et d'industrie – Encyclopédie juridique Dalloz – Répertoire de droit commercial – Paris, 2005
- Pratique et droit des Chambres de commerce et d'industrie françaises – Réforme 2004–2005 – Paris, 2004 – ISBN 9782951436824
- Origine et histoire des juridictions consulaires et des Chambres de commerce et d'industrie Françaises – Paris, 2002 – ISBN 9782951436817
- Chambres de commerce et d'industrie – Encyclopédie juridique Dalloz – Répertoire de droit commercial – Paris, 1999
- L' institution des Chambres de commerce : pouvoirs et contrepoids – Librairie générale de droit et de jurisprudence (LGDJ) – Paris, 1992 – ISBN 978-2275006475

== Award ==
- History Award (1992) from the Assembly of French Chambers of Commerce and Industry (ACFCI)

== Family ==
Descended from a wealthy family established as early as 1850 in Algiers André-Pierre Nouvion's grandfather was the shipowner Alexandre Warrain, former mayor of Marseille and president of the Chamber of commerce. His father is the pneumologist Henri Nouvion, known for his research work in Phthisiology.
