= Oisseau-le-Petit =

- Commune
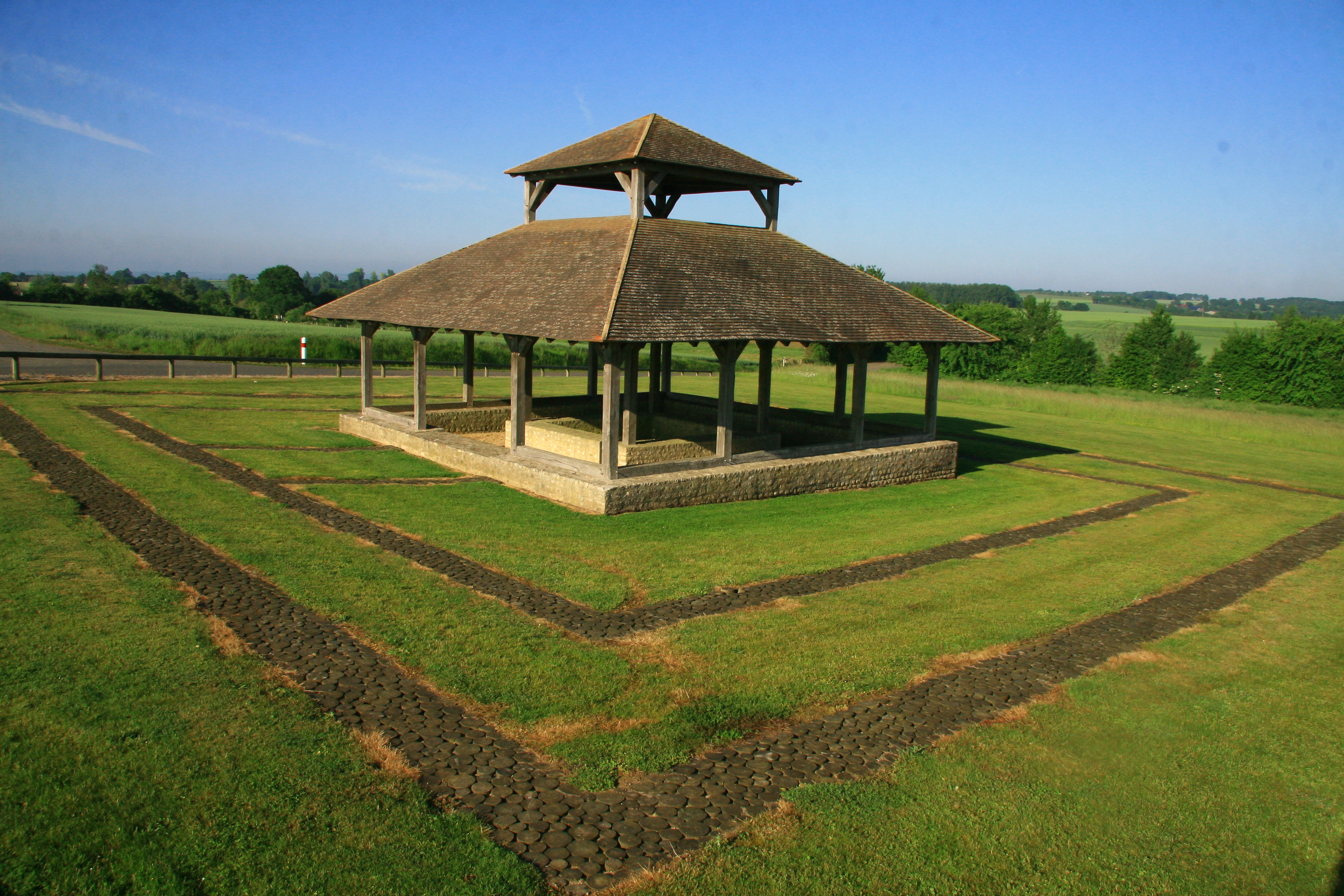
- The fanum of Oisseau-le-Petit
- Location of Oisseau-le-Petit
- Location within France Location within Pays de la Loire
- Coordinates: 48°20′54″N 0°05′14″E
- Country: France
- Region: Pays de la Loire
- Department: Sarthe
- Arrondissement: Mamers
- Canton: Sillé-le-Guillaume
- Intercommunality: Haute Sarthe Alpes Mancelles

Government
  - Mayor (2020–2026): Patrick Goyer
- Area^{1}: 8.60 km^{2} (3.32 sq mi)
- Highest elevation: 190 m (620 ft)
- Lowest elevation: 96 m (315 ft)
- Population (2023): 671
  - Density: 78.0/km^{2} (202/sq mi)
- Demonym: Oxellois
- Time zone: UTC+01:00 (CET)
  - Summer (DST): UTC+02:00 (CEST)
- INSEE/Postal code: 72225 /72610
- ^{1} French Land Register data, which excludes lakes, ponds, glaciers > 1 km^{2} (0.386 sq mi or 247 acres) and river estuaries.

Oisseau-le-Petit is a commune in the Sarthe department in the region of Pays de la Loire in north-western France.

== Geography ==
The commune is made up of the following collection of villages and hamlets, Les Noës, Oisseau-le-Petit, L'Aumône, Le Fourneau, La Touche, Longues Mézières, Allonnes and Palicot.

== Points of Interest ==
=== National Heritage sites ===
The Commune has a total of 2 buildings and areas listed as a Monument historique:

- Fanum gallo-romain - remains of a Gallo-Roman Fanum that was listed as a monument historique in 1987.
- Presbytère d'Oisseau-le-Petit - a fifteenth century Presbytery which was listed as a monument historique in 1977.

== See also ==
- Communes of the Sarthe department
