= Brives =

Brives may refer to:

- Brives, Indre, Indre departement, France
- Brives-Charensac, Haute-Loire departement, France

== See also ==
- Brive, name of Brive-la-Gaillarde until 1919, Corrèze departement, France
