= Argenton =

Argenton may refer to:

Places

- Argenton, New South Wales, a suburb in the City of Lake Macquarie in New South Wales, Australia
- Argenton, Lot-et-Garonne, a French commune in the Lot-et-Garonne department
- Argenton-les-Vallées, a French commune in the Deux-Sèvres department
- Argenton-l'Église, a French commune in the Deux-Sèvres department
- Argenton-Château, a former commune of the Deux-Sèvres department, now part of Argenton-les-Vallées
- Argenton-Notre-Dame, a French commune in the Mayenne department
- Argenton-sur-Creuse, a French commune in the Indre department
- Argenton (river), a river in western France

Surname

- Alessandro Argenton (born 1937), Italian equestrian
- Anésio Argenton (1931–2011), Brazilian cyclist
