= Chambord =

Chambord can refer to:

- Chambord (liqueur), a brand of raspberry-flavored liqueur
- Chambord Apartments (1921), San Francisco, California
- Château de Chambord, a French château built in the 16th century
- Chambord, Loir-et-Cher, the French commune where the château is located
- Chambord, Eure, a commune in the Eure département of France
- Chambord, Quebec, town and railway junction in Canada
  - Chambord meteorite, an iron meteorite found near Chambord, Quebec
- Henri, Count of Chambord, a pretender to the French crown from the House of Bourbon
- Simca Vedette Chambord, a French car
- Simca Chambord (Brazilian model), a Brazilian-made car, from a subsidiary of the French company Simca
- Chambord, a line of French press coffee makers made by Bodum
