= Afon Soch =

River in Gwynedd, Wales

Coordinates: 52°49′35″N 4°30′13″W

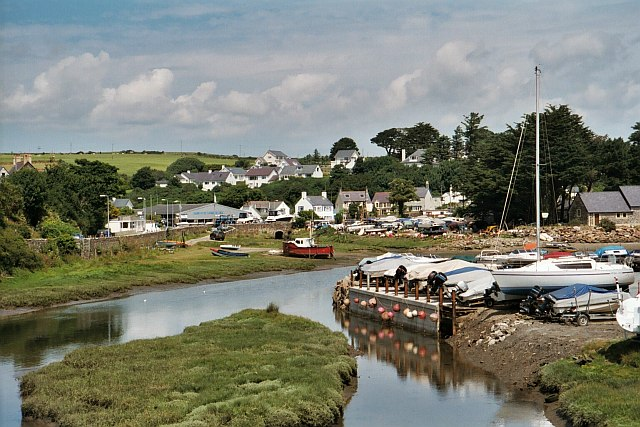
The inner harbour at Abersoch offers sheltered moorings as the Afon Soch widens just before reaching the sea.

The Afon Soch is a short river on the Llŷn peninsula, Gwynedd, Wales. It arises to the north of the village of Sarn Meyllteyrn, through which it then flows, turning southeast towards Botwnnog. Beyond Botwnnog it is joined by its main left-bank tributary, the Afon Horon, which rises to the east of Carn Fadryn. Their combined flow approaches the coast at Porth Neigwl (or Hell's Mouth) but instead the river turns sharply northwards at Llanengan and curves around east to Abersoch where it enters the sea. A short section of the Soch valley is followed by the Wales Coast Path where it takes a route inland of Porth Neigwl. Both the Soch and the Horon are misfit streams within valleys that were formed by glacial meltwater. The river name is reckoned to be of Irish origin, the old Irish word 'socc' meaning a sow (used in the sense of an animal that burrows through the land). There are a number of other Irish names in Llŷn.
