= List of National Nature Reserves of France =

The list of National Nature Reserves of France presents the list of National Nature Reserves, in French Réserves Naturelles Nationales, (RNN) located on French territory.

Since the law on local democracy of 2002, the six former RNN 24, 51, 85, 120, 147 and 151, located in Corsica, are now known as "Corsican Nature Reserves", in French Réserves naturelles de Corse, (RNC).

The oldest French RNN is that of Lake Luitel, established in 1961.

According to the INSEE, a nature reserve is a part of the territory where fauna, flora, soil, waters, mineral and fossil deposits and, in general, the environment tof particular importance are protected. This territory should be protected from any artificial intervention likely to degrade it.

On February 1, 2020, 167 national natural reserves exists in France

== List of national natural reserves ==
Name	Region	Department	Communes	Established	Area (km^{2})	Code
Pointe de Givet (Givet Point)	Grand Est	Ardennes	Charnois, Chooz, Foisches, Fromelennes, Givet, Rancennes	1999	3,7	RNN145
Vireux-Molhain	Grand Est	Ardennes	Vireux-Molhain	1991	0,02	RNN104
Forêt d'Orient (Orient Forest)	Grand Est	Aube	Amance, Brévonnes, Mathaux, Piney, Radonvilliers	2002	15,6	RNN154
Étang de la Horre (Horre Pond)	Grand Est	Aube, Haute-Marne	Droyes, Lentilles, Puellemontier	2000	4,15	RNN149
Delta de la Sauer (Sauer Delta)	Grand Est	Bas-Rhin	Munchhausen, Seltz	1997	4,9	RNN135
Forêt d'Erstein (Erstein Forest)	Grand Est	Bas-Rhin	Erstein	1989	1,8	RNN98
Forêt d'Offendorf (Offendorf Forest)	Grand Est	Bas-Rhin	Offendorf	1989	0,6	RNN97
Fôrets de Mayotte (Forests of Mayotte)	Mayotte	Mayotte	Acoua, Bandraboua, Bandrélé, Chiconi, Chirongui, Dembeni, Kani-Kéli, Koungou, M'Tsamboro, Mamoudzou, Ouangani, Sada, Tsingoni	2021	28.01	RNN328
Île du Rohrschollen (Rohrschollen Island)	Grand Est	Bas-Rhin	Strasbourg	1997	3,1	RNN133
Massif forestier de Strasbourg-Neuhof/Illkirch-Graffenstaden (Strasbourg-Neuhof/Illkirch-Graffenstaden Forester Massif)	Grand Est	Bas-Rhin	Strasbourg, Illkirch-Graffenstaden	2012	9,45	RNN176
Ballons comtois	Bourgogne-Franche-Comté, Grand Est	Haute-Saône, Territoire de Belfort, Vosges	Auxelles-Haut, Château-Lambert, Lepuix-Gy, Miellin, Plancher-les-Mines, Saint-Maurice-sur-Moselle	2002	22,6	RNN153
Chalmessin	Grand Est	Haute-Marne	Vals-des-Tilles	1993	1,24	RNN114
Frankenthal-Missheimle	Grand Est	Haut-Rhin	Stosswihr	1995	7,5	RNN126
Petite Camargue alsacienne (Little Alsacian Camargue)	Grand Est	Haut-Rhin	Bartenheim, Kembs, Rosenau, Saint-Louis, Village-Neuf	1982	9	RNN60
Massif du Ventron (Ventron Massif)	Grand Est	Haut-Rhin, Vosges	Cornimont, Fellering, Kruth, Ventron, Wildenstein	1989	16,5	RNN95
Pâtis d'Oger et du Mesnil-sur-Oger (Oger and Mesnil-sur-Oger Pasture)	Grand Est	Marne	Le Mesnil-sur-Oger, Oger	2006	1,3	RNN159
Hettange-Grande	Grand Est	Moselle	Hettange-Grande	1985	0,06	RNN75
Montenach	Grand Est	Moselle	Montenach	1994	1,1	RNN116
Rochers et Tourbières du Pays de Bitche (Pays de Bitche Boulders and Peatlands)	Grand Est	Moselle	Baerenthal, Éguelshardt, Mouterhouse, Philippsbourg, Roppeviller, Sturzelbronn	1998	3,6	RNN141
Tanet-Gazon-du-Faing	Grand Est	Vosges	Le Valtin, Plainfaing	1988	5	RNN93
Tourbière de Machais (Machais Peatland)	Grand Est	Vosges	La Bresse	1988	1,4	RNN94
Astroblème de Rochechouart-Chassenon (Rochechouart-Chassenon Astrobleme)	Nouvelle-Aquitaine	Haute-Vienne, Charente	Chassenon, Chéronnac, Pressignac, Rochechouart, Videix	2008	0,5	RNN169
Baie de l'Aiguillon (L'Aiguillon Bay)	Pays de la Loire, Nouvelle-Aquitaine	Charente-Maritime, Vendée	L'Aiguillon-sur-Mer, Champagné-les-Marais, Puyravault, Sainte-Radégonde-des-Noyers, Saint-Michel-en-l'Herm, Triaize	1996	23	RNN130
Lilleau des Niges	Nouvelle-Aquitaine	Charente-Maritime	Les Portes-en-Ré	1980	1,2	RNN45
Marais d'Yves (Yves Marsh)	Nouvelle-Aquitaine	Charente-Maritime	Yves	1981	1,9	RNN53
Moëze-Oléron	Nouvelle-Aquitaine	Charente-Maritime	Moëze	1985	67,2	RNN77
Étang des Landes (Landes Pond)	Nouvelle-Aquitaine	Creuse	Lussat	2004	1,7	RNN158
Toarcien	Nouvelle-Aquitaine	Deux-Sèvres	Sainte-Verge	1987	0,006	RNN91
Banc d'Arguin (Arguin Sandbank)	Nouvelle-Aquitaine	Gironde	La Teste-de-Buch	1972	43,6	RNN5
Dunes et marais d'Hourtin (Hourtin Dunes and Marsh)	Nouvelle-Aquitaine	Gironde	Hourtin	2009	21,5	RNN172
Étang de Cousseau (Cousseau Pond)	Nouvelle-Aquitaine	Gironde	Lacanau	1976	6	RNN31
Géologique de Saucats et La Brède (Saucats and La Brède Geological Formation)	Nouvelle-Aquitaine	Gironde	La Brède, Saucats	1982	0,8	RNN62
Marais de Bruges (Bruges Marsh)	Nouvelle-Aquitaine	Gironde	Bruges	1983	2,6	RNN64
Prés salés d'Arès et de Lège-Cap-Ferret (Arès and Lège-Cap-Ferret Salt Marshes)	Nouvelle-Aquitaine	Gironde	Arès, Lège-Cap-Ferret	1983	5	RNN65
Tourbière des Dauges (Dauges Peatland)	Nouvelle-Aquitaine	Haute-Vienne	Saint-Léger-la-Montagne	1998	2	RNN144
Courant d'Huchet (Huchet Current)	Nouvelle-Aquitaine	Landes	Léon, Moliets-et-Maa, Vielle-Saint-Girons	1981	6,2	RNN57
Étang Noir (Black Pond)	Nouvelle-Aquitaine	Landes	Seignosse, Tosse	1974	0,5	RNN17
Marais d'Orx (Orx Marsh)	Nouvelle-Aquitaine	Landes	Labenne, Orx, Saint-André-de-Seignanx	1995	7,8	RNN123
Étang de la Mazière (Mazière Pond)	Nouvelle-Aquitaine	Lot-et-Garonne	Villeton	1985	0,7	RNN76
Frayère d'Alose (Alose Spawning Ground)	Nouvelle-Aquitaine	Lot-et-Garonne	Agen, Le Passage	1981	0,5	RNN52
Vallée d'Ossau (Ossau Valley)	Nouvelle-Aquitaine	Pyrénées-Atlantiques	Aste-Béon, Bielle, Bilhères, Castet	1974	0,8	RNN20
Pinail	Nouvelle-Aquitaine	Vienne	Vouneuil-sur-Vienne	1980	1,35	RNN44
Grotte de Hautecourt (Hautecourt Cave)	Auvergne-Rhône-Alpes	Ain	Hautecourt-Romanèche	1980	0,1	RNN47
Haute chaîne du Jura (Jura High Range)	Auvergne-Rhône-Alpes	Ain	Bellegarde-sur-Valserine, Chézery-Forens, Collonges, Confort, Crozet, Divonne-les-Bains, Échenevex, Farges, Gex, Lancrans, Léaz, Lélex, Mijoux, Péron, Saint-Jean-de-Gonville, Sergy, Thoiry, Vesancy	1993	109,1	RNN112
Haut-Rhône français (French High Rhône)	Auvergne-Rhône-Alpes	Ain, Isère, Savoie	Aoste, Le Bouchage, Brangues, Brégnier-Cordon, Briord, Champagneux, Creys-Mépieu, Les Avenières, Lhuis, Murs-et-Gélignieux, Saint-Benoît, Saint-Genix-sur-Guiers, Saint-Victor-de-Morestel	2013	17,07	RNN178
Marais de Lavours (Lavours Marsh)	Auvergne-Rhône-Alpes	Ain	Béon, Ceyzérieu, Culoz	1984	4,7	RNN68
Val d'Allier (Allier Valley)	Auvergne-Rhône-Alpes	Allier	Bessay-sur-Allier, Bressolles, Chemilly, Châtel-de-Neuvre, Contigny, La Ferté-Hauterive, Monétay-sur-Allier, Saint-Loup, Toulon-sur-Allier	1994	14,5	RNN119
Île de la Platière (Platière Island)	Auvergne-Rhône-Alpes	Drôme, Isère, Loire	Limony, Le Péage-de-Roussillon, Sablons, Saint-Pierre-de-Bœuf, Salaise-sur-Sanne, Serrières	1986	4,8	RNN79
Hauts plateaux du Vercors (High Plateaus of Vercors)	Auvergne-Rhône-Alpes	Drôme, Isère	Châtillon-en-Diois, Chichilianne, Corrençon-en-Vercors, Gresse-en-Vercors, La Chapelle-en-Vercors, Laval-d'Aix, Romeyer, Saint-Agnan-en-Vercors, Saint-Andéol, Saint-Martin-de-Clelles, Saint-Michel-les-Portes, Treschenu-Creyers	1985	170,3	RNN74
Ramières du val de Drôme (Drôme Valley Hedges)	Auvergne-Rhône-Alpes	Drôme	Alles, Chabrillan, Eurre, Grâne, Livron	1987	3,5	RNN89
Aiguilles Rouges	Auvergne-Rhône-Alpes	Haute-Savoie	Chamonix-Mont-Blanc, Vallorcine	1974	32,8	RNN18
Bout-du-Lac d'Annecy (End of Annecy Lake)	Auvergne-Rhône-Alpes	Haute-Savoie	Doussard	1975	0,9	RNN21
Carlaveyron	Auvergne-Rhône-Alpes	Haute-Savoie	Les Houches	1991	6	RNN103
Contamines-Montjoie	Auvergne-Rhône-Alpes	Haute-Savoie	Contamines-Montjoie	1979	55	RNN38
Delta de la Dranse (Dranse Delta)	Auvergne-Rhône-Alpes	Haute-Savoie	Publier	1980	0,5	RNN43
Passy	Auvergne-Rhône-Alpes	Haute-Savoie	Passy	1980	17,2	RNN50
Roc de Chère (Chère Boulder)	Auvergne-Rhône-Alpes	Haute-Savoie	Talloires	1977	0,7	RNN36
Sixt-Passy	Auvergne-Rhône-Alpes	Haute-Savoie	Passy, Sixt-Fer-à-Cheval	1977	92	RNN35
Vallon de Bérard (Bérard Vale)	Auvergne-Rhône-Alpes	Haute-Savoie	Vallorcine	1992	5,4	RNN107
Étang du Grand-Lemps (Grand-Lemps Pond)	Auvergne-Rhône-Alpes	Isère	Châbons, Le Grand-Lemps	1993	0,5	RNN115
Haute vallée du Béranger (Béranger High Valley)	Auvergne-Rhône-Alpes	Isère	Valjouffrey	1974	0,8	RNN14
Haute Vallée du Vénéon (Vénéon High Valley)	Auvergne-Rhône-Alpes	Isère	Saint-Christophe-en-Oisans	1974	0,6	RNN13
Lac Luitel (Luitel Lake)	Auvergne-Rhône-Alpes	Isère	Séchilienne	1961	0,2	RNN1
Les Hauts de Chartreuse (Chartreuse Summits)	Auvergne-Rhône-Alpes	Isère, Savoie	Apremont, Chapareillan, Entremont-le-Vieux, Les Marches, Saint-Bernard-du-Touvet, Sainte-Marie-du-Mont, Saint-Pancrace, Saint-Pierre-de-Chartreuse, Saint-Pierre-d'Entremont (Isère), Saint-Pierre-d'Entremont (Savoie)	1997	44,2	RNN136
Gorges de l'Ardèche (Ardèche Gorges)	Occitanie, Auvergne-Rhône-Alpes	Gard, Ardèche	Aiguèze, Bidon, Le Garn, Labastide-de-Virac, Saint-Marcel-d'Ardèche, Saint-Martin-d'Ardèche, Saint-Remèze, Vallon-Pont-d'Arc	1980	19,5	RNN41
Chastreix-Sancy	Auvergne-Rhône-Alpes	Puy-de-Dôme	Besse-et-Saint-Anastaise, Chambon-sur-Lac, Chastreix, Mont-Dore, Picherande	2007	19	RNN165
Rocher de la Jaquette (Jaquette Boulder)	Auvergne-Rhône-Alpes	Puy-de-Dôme	Mazoires	1976	0,2	RNN34
Sagnes de La Godivelle (La Godivelle Wet Moors)	Auvergne-Rhône-Alpes	Puy-de-Dôme	La Godivelle	1975	0,2	RNN23
Vallée de Chaudefour (Chaudefour Valley)	Auvergne-Rhône-Alpes	Puy-de-Dôme	Chambon-sur-Lac	1991	8,2	RNN105
La Bailletaz	Auvergne-Rhône-Alpes	Savoie	Val-d'Isère	2000	4,95	RNN150
Grande Sassière	Auvergne-Rhône-Alpes	Savoie	Tignes	1973	22,3	RNN7
Hauts de Villaroger (Villaroger Summits)	Auvergne-Rhône-Alpes	Savoie	Villaroger	1991	10,6	RNN101
Plan de Tuéda (Tuéda Flat)	Auvergne-Rhône-Alpes	Savoie	Les Allues	1990	11,1	RNN100
Tignes-Champagny	Auvergne-Rhône-Alpes	Savoie	Champagny, Tignes	1963	13,2	RNN2
La Combe Lavaux-Jean Roland (Lavaux-Jean Anticlinical Valley)	Bourgogne-Franche-Comté	Côte-d'Or	Brochon, Gevrey-Chambertin	2004	4,9	RNN157
Lac de Remoray (Remoray Lake)	Bourgogne-Franche-Comté	Doubs	Labergement-Sainte-Marie, Remoray-Boujeons	1980	3,5	RNN46
Ravin de Valbois (Valbois Ravine)	Bourgogne-Franche-Comté	Doubs	Cléron, Chassagne-Saint-Denis	1983	2,35	RNN66
Grotte du Carrousel (Carrousel Cave)	Bourgogne-Franche-Comté	Haute-Saône	Conflandey, Port-sur-Saône	1990	0,02	RNN99
Sabot de Frotey	Bourgogne-Franche-Comté	Haute-Saône	Frotey-lès-Vesoul	1981	1	RNN54
Grotte de Gravelle (Gravelle Cave)	Bourgogne-Franche-Comté	Jura	Macornay	1992	0,01	RNN110
Île du Girard (Girard Island)	Bourgogne-Franche-Comté	Jura	Gevry, Rahon, Molay, Parcey	1982	1,35	RNN61
Val de Loire (Loire Valley)	Bourgogne-Franche-Comté, Centre-Val de Loire	Nièvre, Cher	Couargues, Herry, La Chapelle-Montlinard, La Charité-sur-Loire, Mesves-sur-Loire, Pouilly-sur-Loire, Tracy-sur-Loire	1995	14,5	RNN127
La Truchère-Ratenelle	Bourgogne-Franche-Comté	Saône-et-Loire	La Truchère, Ratenelle	1980	0,9	RNN49
Bois du Parc (Park Wood)	Bourgogne-Franche-Comté	Yonne	Mailly-le-Château	1979	0,45	RNN39
Baie de Saint-Brieuc (Saint-Brieuc Bay)	Bretagne (Brittany)	Côtes-d'Armor	Hillion, Langueux, Morieux, Saint-Brieuc, Yffiniac	1998	11,4	RNN140
Sept-Îles (Seven Islands)	Bretagne (Brittany)	Côtes-d'Armor	Perros-Guirec	1976	3,2	RNN32
Iroise	Bretagne (Brittany)	Finistère	Le Conquet	1992	0,4	RNN108
Saint-Nicolas des Glénan	Bretagne (Brittany)	Finistère	Fouesnant	1974	0,15	RNN10
Venec	Bretagne (Brittany)	Finistère	Brennilis	1993	0,5	RNN11
François Le Bail (Île de Groix (Groix Island))	Bretagne (Brittany)	Morbihan	Groix	1982	1	RNN63
Marais de Séné (Séné Marsh)	Bretagne (Brittany)	Morbihan	Séné	1996	4,1	RNN131
Chaumes du Verniller (Verniller Stubble Fields)	Centre-Val de Loire	Cher	La Chapelle-Saint-Ursin, Morthomiers	2014	0,8	RNN179
Chérine	Centre-Val de Loire	Indre	Saint-Michel-en-Brenne	1985	3,7	RNN78
Vallées de la Grand-Pierre et Vitain (Grand-Pierre and Vitain Valleys)	Centre-Val de Loire	Loir-et-Cher	Averdon, Marolles	1979	2.75	RNN37
Saint-Mesmin	Centre-Val de Loire	Loiret	Saint-Pryvé-Saint-Mesmin, Mareau-aux-Prés, La Chapelle-Saint-Mesmin, Chaingy, Saint-Ay	1975	2,6	RNN26
La Désirade	Guadeloupe	Guadeloupe	La Désirade	2011	0,6	RNN173
Îles de la Petite-Terre (Petite-Terre Islands)	Guadeloupe	Guadeloupe	La Désirade	1998	9,9	RNN142
Saint-Barthélemy	Guadeloupe	Guadeloupe	Saint-Barthélemy	1996	12	RNN132
Saint-Martin	Guadeloupe	Guadeloupe	Saint-Martin	1998	30,6	RNN143
L'Amana	French Guiana	French Guiana	Awala-Yalimapo, Mana	1998	148	RNN138
Île du Grand Connétable (Grand Connétable Island)	French Guiana	French Guiana	Régina	1992	78,5	RNN109
La Trinité	French Guiana	French Guiana	Mana, Saint-Élie	1996	760	RNN129
Marais de Kaw-Roura (Kaw-Roura Marches)	French Guiana	French Guiana	Régina, Roura	1998	947	RNN139
Mont Grand Matoury (Grand Matoury Mount)	French Guiana	French Guiana	Matoury	2006	21,2	RNN160
Nouragues	French Guiana	French Guiana	Régina, Roura	1995	1058	RNN128
Grotte du T.M. 71 (T.M. 71 Cave)	Occitanie	Aude	Fontanès-de-Sault	1987	1	RNN88
Néouvielle	Occitanie	Hautes-Pyrénées	Aragnouet, Saint-Lary-Soulan, Vielle-Aure	1968	23,1	RNN4
Bagnas	Occitanie	Hérault	Agde, Marseillan	1983	5,6	RNN67
L'Estagnol	Occitanie	Hérault	Villeneuve-lès-Maguelone	1975	0,8	RNN27
Roque-Haute	Occitanie	Hérault	Portiragnes, Vias	1975	1,5	RNN25
Intérêt géologique du département du Lot (Lot Department Geological Interest)	Occitanie	Lot	Bach, Beauregard, Bouziès, Cabrerets, Cajarc, Calvignac, Cénevières, Concots, Crayssac, Crégols, Escamps, Larnagol, Limogne-en-Quercy, Puyjourdes, Saillac, Saint-Chels, Saint-Cirq-Lapopie, Saint-Jean-de-Laur, Saint-Martin-Labouval, Varaire, Vaylats	2015	8,0	RNN180
Cerbère-Banyuls	Occitanie	Pyrénées-Orientales	Banyuls-sur-Mer, Cerbère	1974	6,5	RNN9
Conat	Occitanie	Pyrénées-Orientales	Conat	1986	5,5	RNN82
Forêt de la Massane (Massane Forest)	Occitanie	Pyrénées-Orientales	Argelès-sur-Mer	1973	3,4	RNN6
Jujols	Occitanie	Pyrénées-Orientales	Jujols	1986	4,7	RNN83
Mantet	Occitanie	Pyrénées-Orientales	Mantet	1984	30,3	RNN72
Mas-Larrieu	Occitanie	Pyrénées-Orientales	Argelès-sur-Mer, Elne	1984	1,45	RNN70
Nohèdes	Occitanie	Pyrénées-Orientales	Nohèdes	1986	21,4	RNN84
Prats-de-Mollo-la-Preste	Occitanie	Pyrénées-Orientales	Prats-de-Mollo-la-Preste	1986	21,9	RNN81
Py	Occitanie	Pyrénées-Orientales	Py	1984	39,3	RNN71
Vallée d'Eyne (Eyne Valley)	Occitanie	Pyrénées-Orientales	Eyne	1993	11,8	RNN113
Étang de Saint-Paul (Saint-Paul Pond)	La Réunion	La Réunion	Saint-Paul	2008	4,5	RNN166
Réserve naturelle marine de La Réunion (La Réunion Marine Natural Reserve)	La Réunion	La Réunion	Les Avirons, L'Étang-Salé, Saint-Leu, Saint-Paul, Les Trois-Bassins	2007	35	RNN164
Sites géologiques de l'Essonne (Essonne Geological Sites)	Île-de-France	Essonne	Auvers-Saint-Georges, Chauffour-lès-Étréchy, Ormoy-la-Rivière, Saint-Hilaire, Saulx-les-Chartreux	1989	0,3	RNN96
La Bassée	Île-de-France	Seine-et-Marne	Gouaix, Grisy-sur-Seine, Jaulnes, Mouy, Noyen-sur-Seine, Les Ormes-sur-Voulzie, Everly	2002	8,5	RNN155
Coteaux de la Seine (Seine Hills)	Île-de-France	Val-d'Oise, Yvelines	Bennecourt, Gommecourt, Haute-Isle, La Roche-Guyon, Vétheuil	2009	2,7	RNN170
Saint-Quentin-en-Yvelines	Île-de-France	Yvelines	Montigny-le-Bretonneux, Trappes	1986	0,9	RNN80
Îlets de Sainte-Anne (Saint-Anne Islets)	Martinique	Martinique	Saint-Anne	1995	0,06	RNN125
Presqu'île de la Caravelle (Caravelle Peninsula)	Martinique	Martinique	La Trinité	1976	3,9	RNN29
Îlot Mbouzi (Mbouzi Islet)	Mayotte	Mayotte	Mamoudzou	2007	1,42	RNN162
Landes de Versigny (Versigny Moors)	Hauts-de-France	Aisne	Versigny	1995	1,0759	RNN124
Marais de Vesles-et-Caumont (Vesles-et-Caumont Marsh)	Hauts-de-France	Aisne	Vesles-et-Caumont	1997	1,1	RNN134
Marais d'Isle (Isle Marsh)	Hauts-de-France	Aisne	Rouvroy, Saint-Quentin	1981	0,5	RNN58
Dune Marchand (Marchand Dune)	Hauts-de-France	Nord	Bray-Dunes, Zuydcoote	1974	0,8	RNN19
Étangs du Romelaëre (Romelaëre Ponds)	Hauts-de-France	Nord, Pas-de-Calais	Nieurlet, Saint-Omer	2008	1	RNN168
Baie de Canche (Canche Bay)	Hauts-de-France	Pas-de-Calais	Camiers, Étaples, Lefaux	1987	5,1	RNN87
Grottes et pelouses d'Acquin-Westbécourt et coteaux de Wavrans-sur-l'Aa (Acquin-Westbécourt Caves and Lawns and Wavrans-sur-l'Aa Hills)	Hauts-de-France	Pas-de-Calais	Acquin-Westbécourt, Wavrans-sur-l'Aa	2008	0,5	RNN167
Platier d'Oye (Oye Reef Flat)	Hauts-de-France	Pas-de-Calais	Oye-Plage	1987	3,9	RNN86
Baie de Somme (Somme Bay)	Hauts-de-France	Somme	Saint-Quentin-en-Tourmont	1994	30	RNN118
Étang Saint-Ladre (Saint-Ladre Pond)	Hauts-de-France	Somme	Boves	1979	0,1	RNN40
Coteau de Mesnil-Soleil (Mesnil-Soleil Hill)	Normandie (Normandy)	Calvados	Damblainville, Versainville	1981	0,25	RNN55
Falaise du Cap-Romain (Cap-Romain Cliff)	Normandie (Normandy)	Calvados	Bernières-sur-Mer, Saint-Aubin-sur-Mer	1984	0,2	RNN69
Forêt domaniale de Cerisy (Cerisy National Forest)	Normandie (Normandy)	Calvados	Cerisy-la-Forêt, Montfiquet	1976	21,2	RNN28
Estuaire de la Seine (Seine Estuary)	Normandie (Normandy)	Calvados, Eure, Seine-Maritime	Berville-sur-Mer, Conteville, La Cerlangue, Saint-Samson-de-la-Roque, Saint-Vigor-d'Ymonville, Sandouville, Tancarville	1997	85,3	RNN137
Marais Vernier (Vernier Marsh)	Normandie (Normandy)	Eure	Sainte-Opportune-la-Mare, Bouquelon	2013	1,5	RNN177
Domaine de Beauguillot (Beauguillot Estate)	Normandie (Normandy)	Manche	Sainte-Marie-du-Mont	1980	5,05	RNN42
Mare de Vauville (Vauville Pond)	Normandie (Normandy)	Manche	Vauville	1976	0,6	RNN30
Sangsurière et Adriennerie	Normandie (Normandy)	Manche	Doville	1991	4	RNN102
Tourbière de Mathon (Mathon Peatland)	Normandie (Normandy)	Manche	Lessay	1973	0,2	RNN8
Lac de Grand-Lieu (Grand-Lieu Lake)	Pays de la Loire	Loire-Atlantique	Saint-Philbert-de-Grand-Lieu	1980	27	RNN48
Casse de la Belle Henriette	Pays de la Loire	Vendée	La Faute-sur-Mer, La Tranche-sur-Mer	2011	3,4	RNN174
Marais de Müllembourg (Müllembourg Marsh)	Pays de la Loire	Vendée	Noirmoutier-en-l'Île	1994	0,5	RNN121
Saint-Denis-du-Payré	Pays de la Loire	Vendée	Saint-Denis-du-Payré	1976	2,1	RNN33
Géologique de Haute-Provence (Haute-Provence Geological Formation)	Provence-Alpes-Côte d'Azur	Alpes-de-Haute-Provence	Aiglun, Angles, Archail, Authon, Auzet, Bargème, Barles, Barras, Barrême, Beaujeu, Beynes, Blieux, Bras-d'Asse, Brenon, Castellane, Le Castellard-Mélan, Champtercier, Chaudon-Norante, Châteauredon, Châteauvieux, Clumanc, Comps-sur-Artuby, Digne-les-Bains, Draix, Entrages, Estoublon, Hautes-Duyes, La Javie, La Martre, Lambruisse, La Palud-sur-Verdon, La Robine-sur-Galabre, Le Bourguet, Le Brusquet, Le Chaffaut, Le Vernet, Majastres, Mallemoisson, Marcoux, Mezel, Mirabeau, Montclar, Moriez, Moustiers-Sainte-Marie, Prads-Haute-Bleone, Rougon, Saint-André-les-Alpes, Saint-Geniez, Saint-Jacques, Saint-Julien-d'Asse, Saint-Lions, Selonnet, Senez, Seyne-les-Alpes, Tartonne, Thoard, Trigance, Verdaches, Vergons	1984	2,7	RNN73
Géologique du Luberon (Luberon Geological Formation)	Provence-Alpes-Côte d'Azur	Alpes-de-Haute-Provence, Vaucluse	Aubenas-les-Alpes, Bonnieux, Cabrières-d'Aigues, Caseneuve, Cheval-Blanc, Céreste, Cucuron, Montfuron, Montjustin, Murs, Oppedette, Reillanne, Revest-des-Brousses, Saignon, Saint-Maime, Saint-Martin-de-Castillon, Saint-Saturnin-lès-Apt, Vachères, Viens, Villeneuve	1987	4	RNN90
Camargue	Provence-Alpes-Côte d'Azur	Bouches-du-Rhône	Arles, Saintes-Maries-de-la-Mer	1975	131,2	RNN22
Coussouls de Crau	Provence-Alpes-Côte d'Azur	Bouches-du-Rhône	Arles, Eyguières, Fos-sur-Mer, Istres, Miramas, Saint-Martin-de-Crau, Salon-de-Provence	2001	74,1	RNN152
Marais du Vigueirat (Vigueirat Marsh)	Provence-Alpes-Côte d'Azur	Bouches-du-Rhône	Arles	2011	9,2	RNN175
Sainte-Victoire	Provence-Alpes-Côte d'Azur	Bouches-du-Rhône	Beaurecueil	1994	1,4	RNN117
Cirque du Grand Lac des Estaris (Estaris Great Lake Cirque)	Provence-Alpes-Côte d'Azur	Hautes-Alpes	Orcières	1974	1,45	RNN15
Haute Vallée de la Séveraisse (Séveraisse High Valley)	Provence-Alpes-Côte d'Azur	Hautes-Alpes	La Chapelle-en-Valgaudémar	1974	1,55	RNN11
Haute Vallée de Saint-Pierre (Saint-Pierre High Valley)	Provence-Alpes-Côte d'Azur	Hautes-Alpes	Pelvoux	1974	0,2	RNN12
Pics du Combeynot (Combeynot Peaks)	Provence-Alpes-Côte d'Azur	Hautes-Alpes	Le Monêtier-les-Bains, Villar-d'Arêne	1974	6,85	RNN16
Ristolas – Mont-Viso	Provence-Alpes-Côte d'Azur	Hautes-Alpes	Ristolas	2007	23	RNN163
Plaine des Maures (Maures Plains)	Provence-Alpes-Côte d'Azur	Var	Le Cannet-des-Maures, La Garde-Freinet, Le Luc-en-Provence, Les Mayons, Vidauban	2009	52,8	RNN171
Terres australes françaises (French Southern Territories)	Terres australes et antarctiques françaises (French Southern and Antarctic Lands)		Amsterdam, Crozet, Kerguelen, Saint-Paul	2006	672969	Réserves naturelles nationales déclassées

== Downgraded National Nature Reserves ==
The following nature reserves have been downgraded (or will be downgraded for Chalmessin) as a result of their integration into other protected areas.

Region	Name	Established	Decommissioned	Code	Remarks
				RNN3	Name could not be found but according to a RNN was decommissioned near Tignes, Auvergne-Rhône-Alpes before Grande Sassière was established. As none of the decommissioned RNN listed here are located in this region, the RNN mentioned in might be the RNN3.
La Réunion	Saint-Philippe – Mare Longue	August 28, 1981	Decree No. 2007-296, Article 32 (March 5, 2007)	RNN56	Integrated to Parc national de La Réunion
Corse (Corsica)	Réserve naturelle des îles Lavezzi (Lavezzi Islands Nature Reserve)	January 6, 1982	September 23, 1999 decree, article 32	RNN59	Integrated to RNC des Bouches de Bonifacio
Guadeloupe	Grand Cul-de-sac marin	November 23, 1987	Decree No. 2009-614, Article 28 (June 3, 2009)	RNN92	Integrated to Parc national de La Guadeloupe
Grand Est	Chalmessin	September 2, 1993	Decree of creation of PN des forêts, Article 30	RNN114	Will be integrated to Parc national des forêts on December 31, 2020
Normandie (Normandy)	Les Mannevilles	September 29, 1994	Decree No. 2013-171, Article 23 (February 25, 2013)	RNN122	Integrated to Marais Vernier (Vernier Marsh)
La Réunion	Roche Écrite	December 21, 1999	Decree No. 2007-296, Article 32 (March 5, 2007)	RNN148	Integrated to Parc national de La Réunion
Provence-Alpes-Côte d'Azur	Archipel de Riou (Riou Archipelago)	August 22, 2003	Decree No. 2012-507, Article 36 (November 1, 2013)	RNN156	Integrated to Parc national des Calanques
