= Villette-lès-Dole =

- Commune
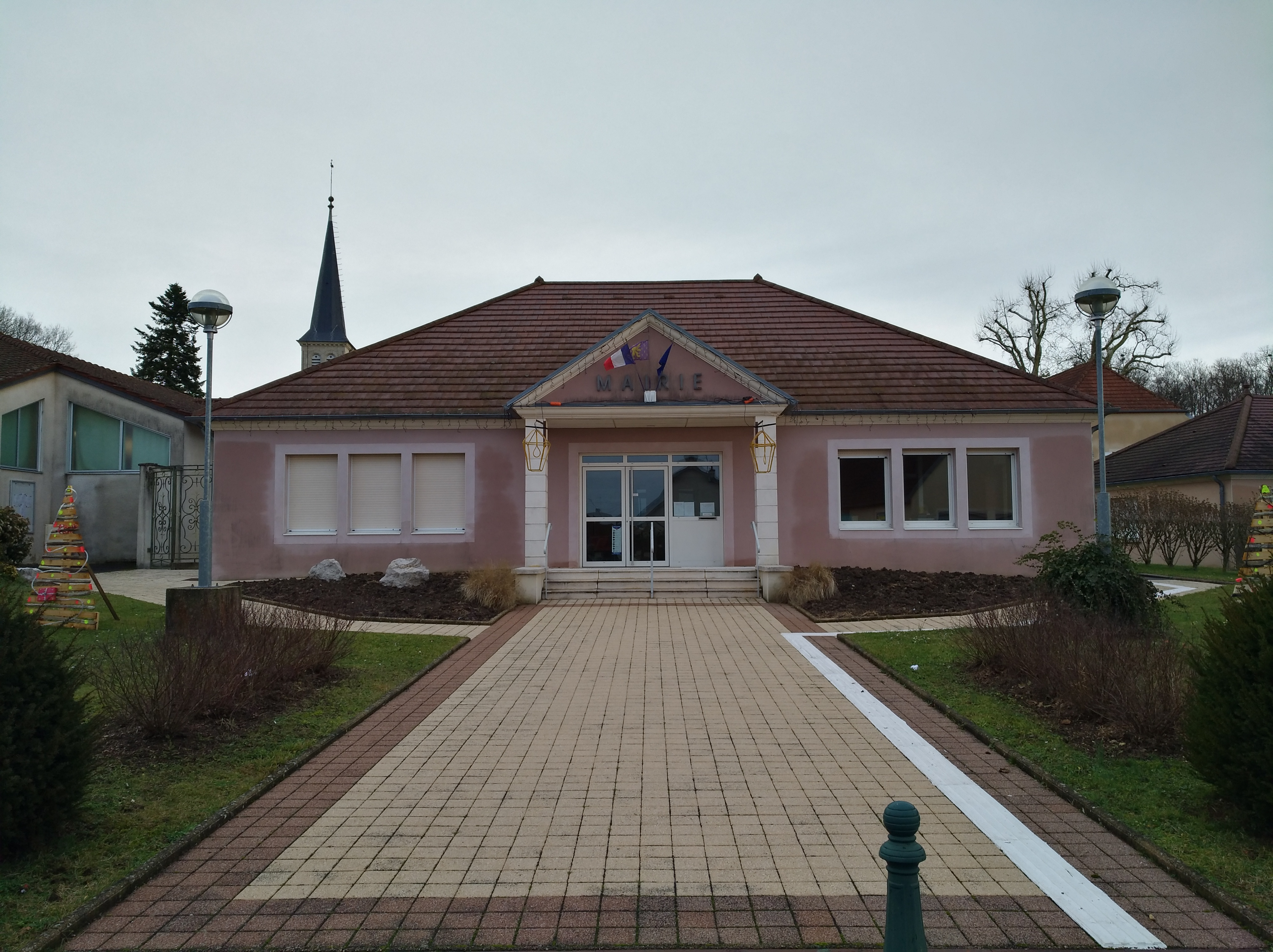
- The town hall in Villette-lès-Dole

- Coat of arms
- Location of Villette-lès-Dole
- Location within France Location within Bourgogne-Franche-Comté
- Coordinates: 47°02′56″N 5°29′43″E
- Country: France
- Region: Bourgogne-Franche-Comté
- Department: Jura
- Arrondissement: Dole
- Canton: Dole-2
- Intercommunality: CA Grand Dole

Government
  - Mayor (2020–2026): Jean-Luc Legrand
- Area^{1}: 4.59 km^{2} (1.77 sq mi)
- Highest elevation: 232 m (761 ft)
- Lowest elevation: 195 m (640 ft)
- Population (2023): 806
  - Density: 176/km^{2} (455/sq mi)
- Time zone: UTC+01:00 (CET)
  - Summer (DST): UTC+02:00 (CEST)
- INSEE/Postal code: 39573 /39100
- ^{1} French Land Register data, which excludes lakes, ponds, glaciers > 1 km^{2} (0.386 sq mi or 247 acres) and river estuaries.

Villette-lès-Dole (French pronunciation: [vilɛt lɛ dɔl], literally Villette near Dole) is a commune in the Jura department in the Bourgogne-Franche-Comté region in eastern France.

== Population ==
Historical population
Year	Pop.	±% p.a.
1968	380	—
1975	379	−0.04%
1982	596	+6.68%
1990	728	+2.53%
1999	648	−1.29%
2007	717	+1.27%
2012	776	+1.59%
2017	771	−0.13%
2023	806	+0.74%
Source: INSEE

== See also ==
- Communes of the Jura department
