= Sainte-Victoire National Nature Reserve =

Regional nature reserve and fossil site in Provence-Alpes-Côte d'Azur, France

- IUCN category III (natural monument or feature)
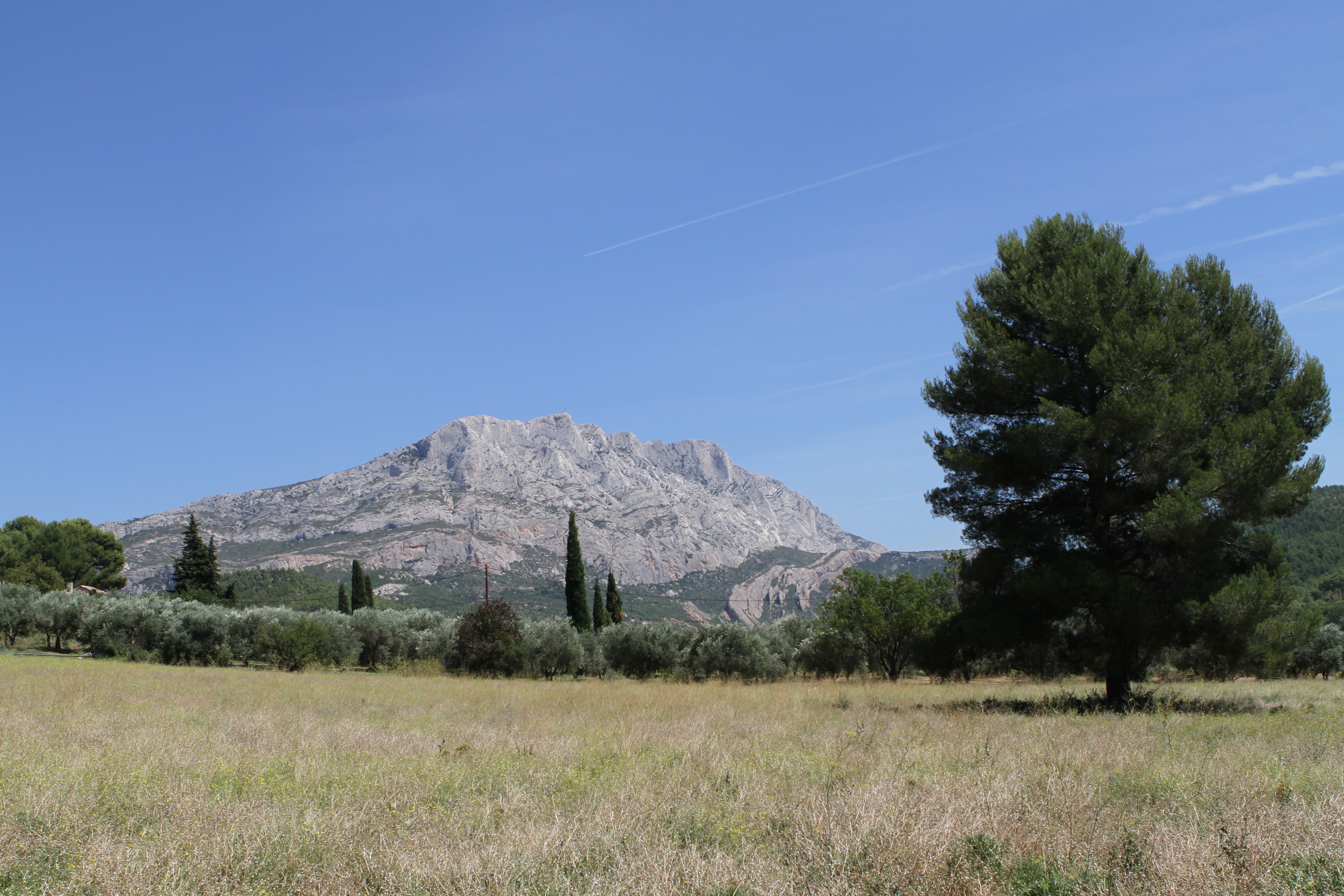
- Montagne Sainte-Victoire
- Interactive map of Sainte-Victoire National Nature Reserve
- Location: Bouches-du-Rhône, France
- Nearest city: Beaurecueil
- Coordinates: 43.5313°N 5.54138°E
- Area: 139.84 ha (345.6 acres)
- Established: 1 March 1994
- Governing body: Departmental Council of Bouches-du-Rhône

Roques-Hautes Fossil Site
- Stratigraphic range: Campanian–Maastrichtian
- Type: Fossil site
- Unit of: Argiles et Grès à Reptiles Formation

Lithology
- Primary: Clay, shale

Location
- Coordinates: 43.5313°N 5.54138°E
- Region: Provence-Alpes-Côte d'Azur
- Country: France

Type section
- Named by: Dughi & Sirugue
- Sainte-Victoire National Nature Reserve (France)

The Sainte-Victoire National Nature Reserve (RNN117) is a national nature reserve located in the Bouches-du-Rhône department. Covering 140 hectares, the nature reserve was established in 1994 to protect the fossilized dinosaur eggs preserved on the western foot of the Montagne Sainte-Victoire.

== Localisation ==
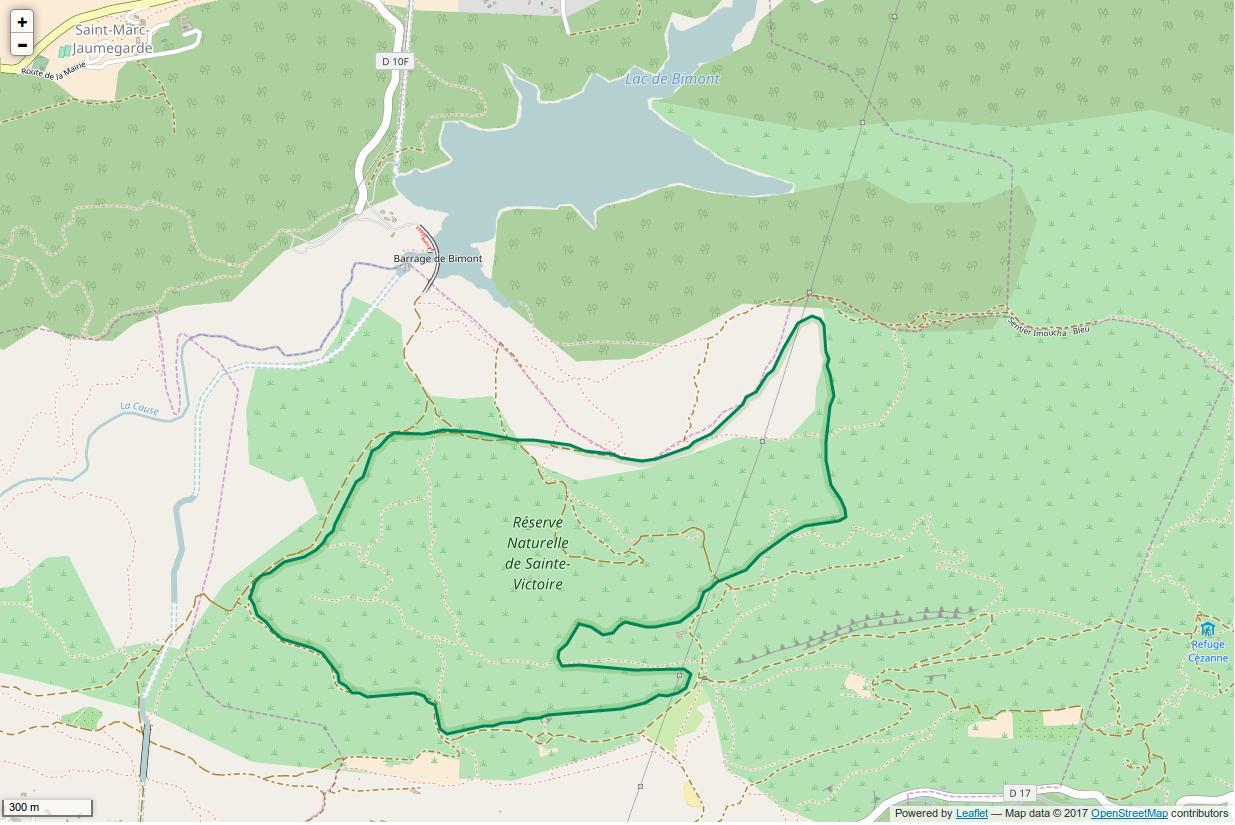
Surroundings of the nature reserve.

The territory of the nature reserve is located in the Bouches-du-Rhône department in Provence-Alpes-Côte d'Azur, on the commune of Beaurecueil. Set on the western foot of the Montagne Sainte-Victoire, the site covers 140 ha and consists of the fossil site of Roques-Hautes. The nature reserve includes a central part named "Les Grands Creux" whose penetration is forbidden and a protection area.

== History of the site and reserve ==
The site is known since 1947 for its paleontological deposit of dinosaur eggs.

Late Cretaceous Provence was a tropical region, occupied by a fluvio-lacustrine biotope favourable to animal reproduction, notably for the egg-laying of large reptiles, such as turtles, crocodiles and dinosaurs. The site was classified as early as 1964, under the law of 1930.

== Ecology (biodiversity, ecological interest, etc.) ==
The principal interest of the site is paleontological, due to the presence of the dinosaur eggs fossil deposits, one of the few of such fossil sites in the world.

=== Roques-Hautes fossil site ===
The Roques-Hautes fossil site is a deposit of dinosaur eggs, located near the Montagne Sainte-Victoire in the commune of Beaurecueil, in the Argiles et Grès à Reptiles Formation. It was uncovered in 1952 by Raymond Dughi and François Sirugue, respectively curator and assistant curator of the Museum d'Histoire Naturelle Aix-en-Provence. It dates from the Late Cretaceous.

== Touristic and educational interest ==
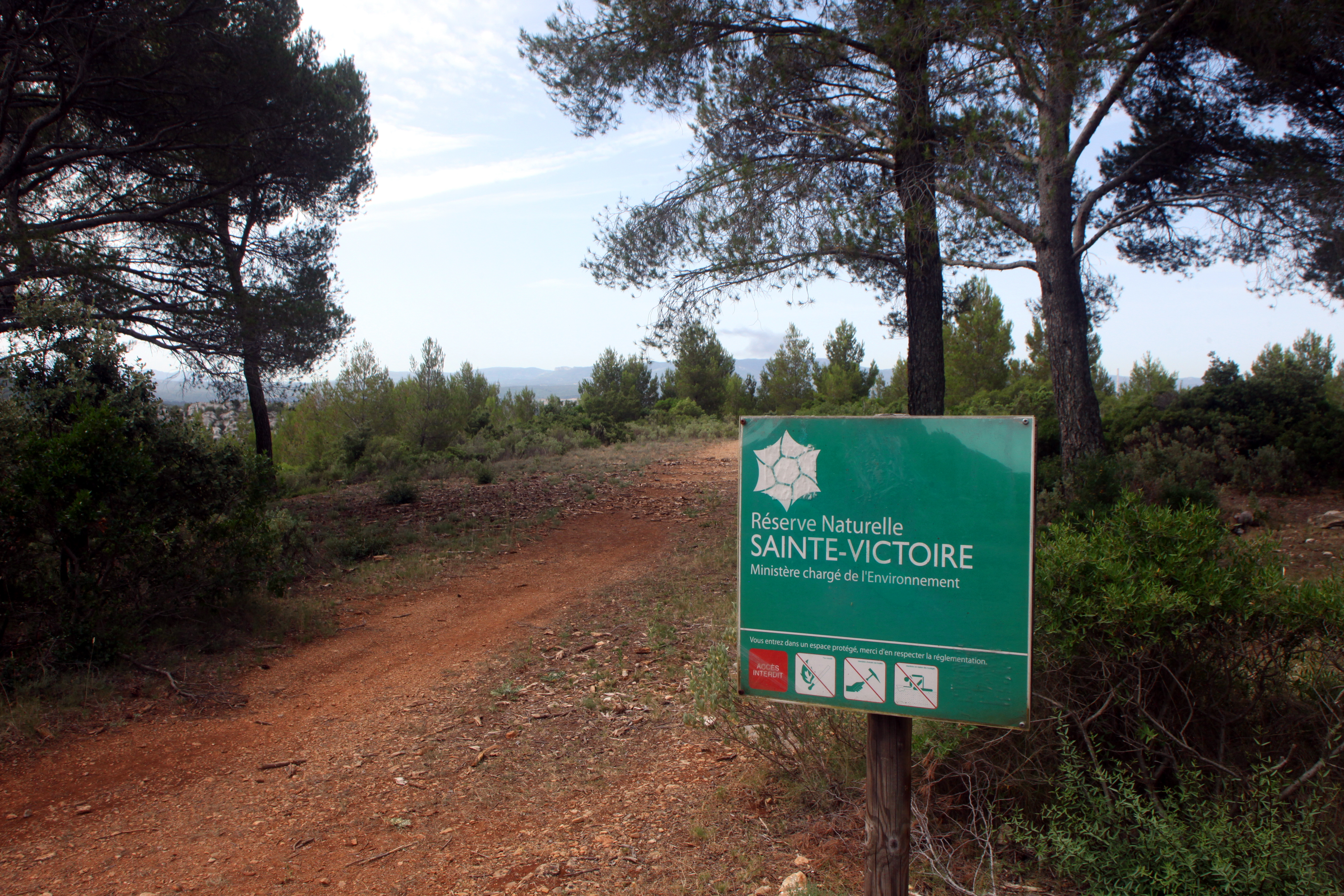
Marking on the nature reserve

The nature reserve can be accessed by the south through the parking lots de Roques-Hautes, de l'Aurigon and du Toscan, served by the D17, or by the north through the road of the Bimont Dam on the commune of Saint-Marc-Jaumegarde, served by the D10.

Access to the Grands-Creux sector is forbidden to the public.

== Administration, management plan, regulations ==
The nature reserve is managed by the Departmental Council of Bouches-du-Rhône.

=== Tools and legal status ===
The nature reserve was established by decree the 1 March 1994.
