= Canton of Dole-2 =

Coordinates: 47.09°N 5.49°E

The canton of Dole-2 is an administrative division of the Jura department, eastern France. It was created at the French canton reorganisation which came into effect in March 2015. Its seat is in Dole.

It consists of the following communes:

1. Choisey
2. Crissey
3. Damparis
4. Dole (partly)
5. Gevry
6. Parcey
7. Villette-lès-Dole
