= Bois du Parc National Nature Reserve =

Regional nature reserve and fossil site in Auvergne-Rhône-Alpes, France

- IUCN category IV (habitat/species management area)
- Interactive map of Bois du Parc National Nature Reserve
- Location: Yonne, France
- Nearest city: Mailly-le-Château
- Coordinates: 47°35′00″N 3°38′53″E
- Area: 45 ha
- Established: 30 August 1979
- Governing body: Conservatoire des sites naturels bourguignons

Bois du Parc National Nature Reserve
- Stratigraphic range: Oxfordian
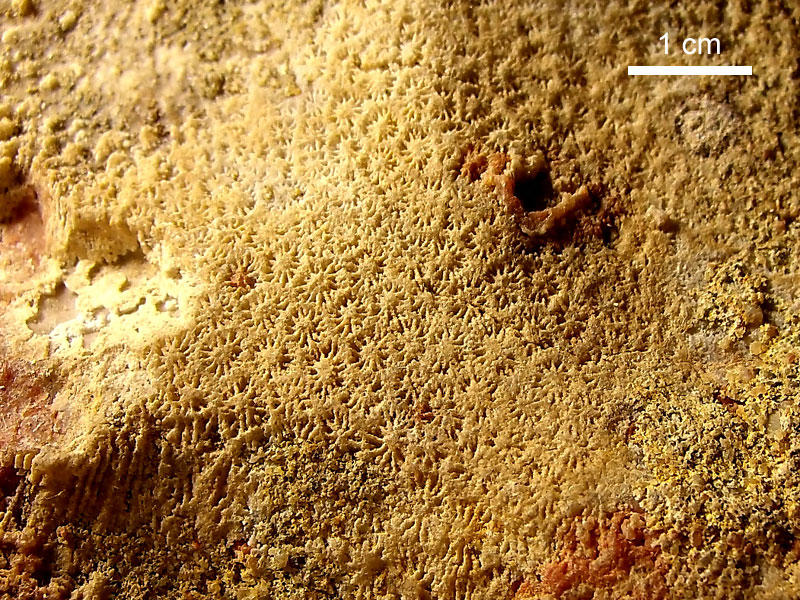
- Samples of fossil corals, Argentina
- Type: Fossil site

Lithology
- Primary: Limestone cliffs

Location
- Coordinates: 47°35′00″N 3°38′53″E
- Region: Bourgogne-Franche-Comté
- Country: France
- Bois du Parc National Nature Reserve (France)

The Bois du Parc National Nature Reserve (RNN39) is a National Nature Reserve located in the department of Yonne. Established in 1979, it spreads over 45 hectares (110 acres), and its most interesting features are its steep-sided cliffs in an important coral reef dating from the Jurassic period.

== Location ==
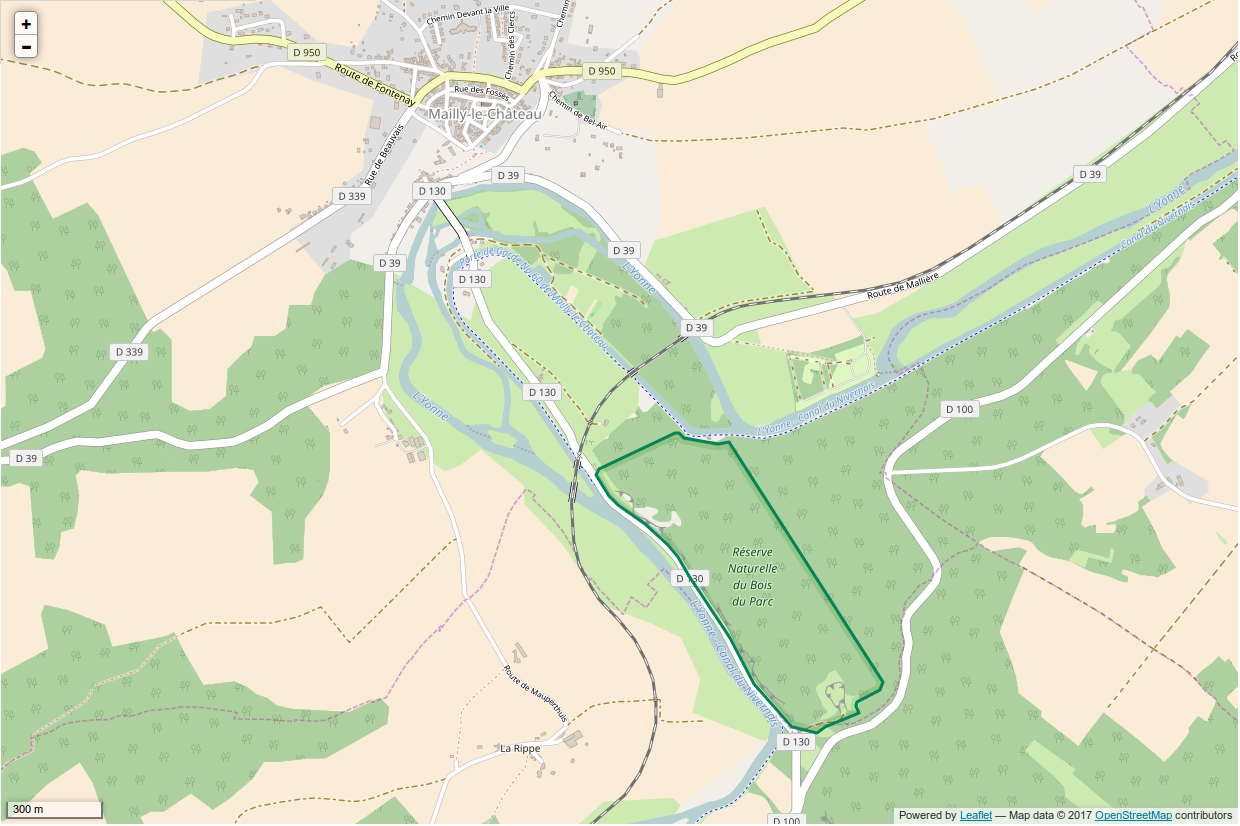
Surroundings of the nature reserve.

The site is located in Burgundy, along the Yonne, between Auxerre and Avallon and in the territory of the commune of Mailly-le-Château.

== History of the site and reserve ==
160 million of years ago, what is now the Yonne valley was a warm and shallow sea, enabling the development of a coral reef characteristic of tropical seas. Fossilized prints of corallite, petrified in its living location, still remains, along with numerous seashells. It is one of the most beautiful outcrops of fossilized corals in France.

== Ecology (biodiversity, ecological interest, etc.) ==
Specific natural environments have colonized the site. The top of the cliffs and rocks is occupied by dry grasslands characterized by the presence of bushlands and southern plants. Those constitutes the most interesting biological diversity of the site. Broadleaf forests, made of sessile oaks, hornbeams and field maples, covers the brown earth of the limestone plateau. In the South-West, downy oaks have colonized the rocky slopes, while beech forests and lindens thrives in the North-facing slope.

=== Flora ===
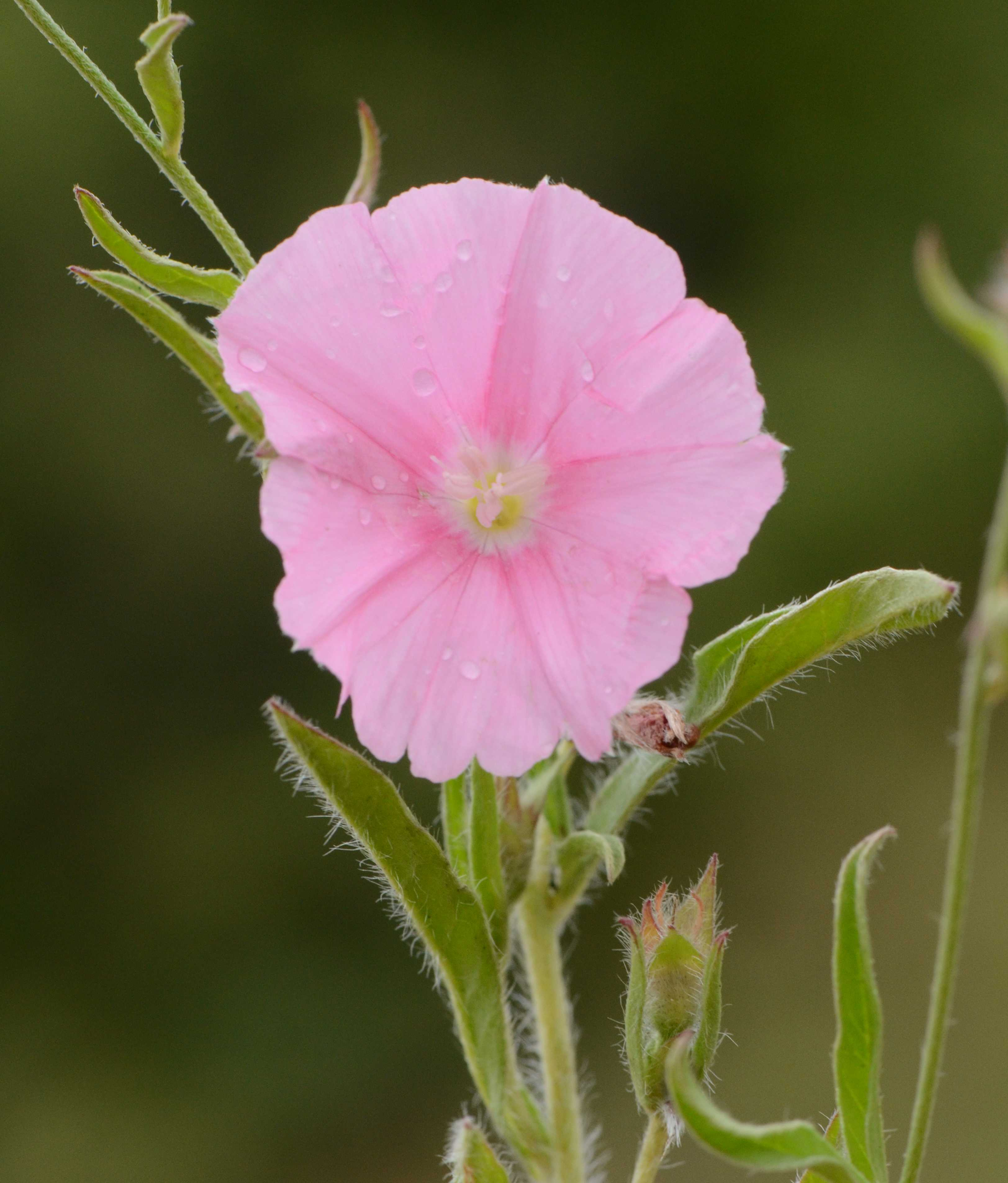
Cantabrican morning glory

Sub-mediterranean species are found on the site, isolated with respect to their common repartition in Southern Burgundy. European feather grass, pasqueflowers, St Bernard's lilies and Cantabrican morning glories can be found in the area.

=== Fauna ===
Local fauna is closely linked with the diversity of natural habitats : cliffs, grasslands, forest.

==== Birds ====
The avifauna is rich, with, in forested areas, the European honey buzzard and the Eurasian sparrowhawk, in their outskirts, the Eurasian blackcap and the western Bonelli's warbler, while the cliffs hosts the black redstart and the common kestrel. The emblematic peregrine falcon nests too in the reserve.

==== Reptiles and amphibians ====
The driest areas hosts several reptiles, such as the green whip snake, the Aesculapian snake and the western green lizard.

==== Invertebrates ====
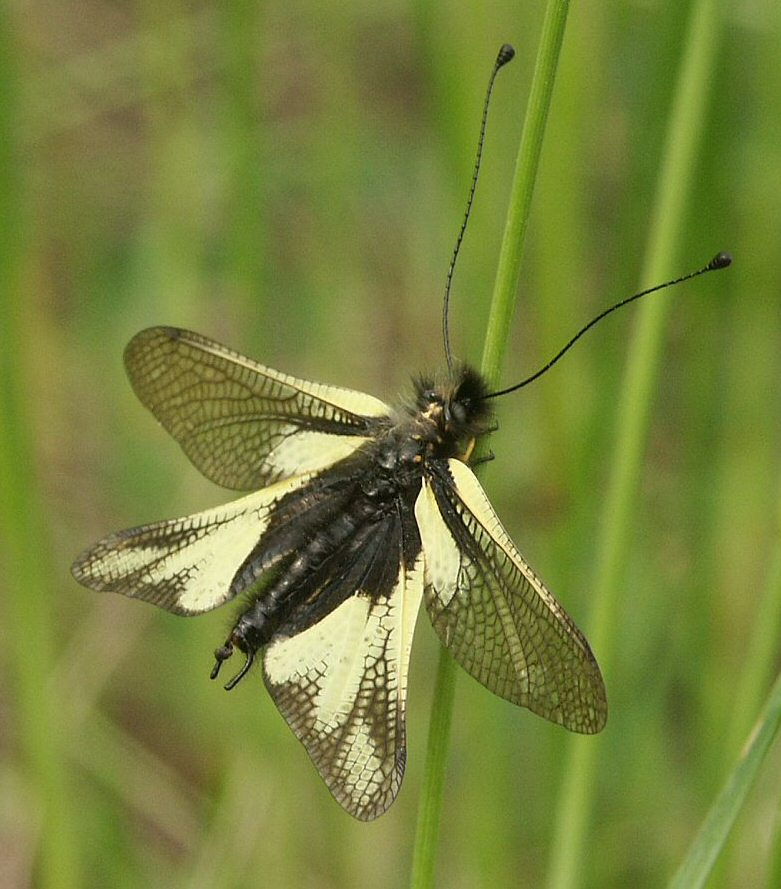
Owly sulphur

The entomologic fauna is quite rich in the grasslands. The most characteristic elements are the European mantis, the New Forest cicada, and the owly sulphur.

== Touristic and educational interest ==
A discovery trail permits to visit freely the nature reserve across the forests and the grasslands in top of the cliffs.

== Administration, management plan, regulations ==
The nature reserve is managed by the Conservatoire des sites naturels bourguignons.

=== Tools and legal status ===
The nature reserve was established the 30 August 1979.
