= Crissey, Jura =

Commune in Bourgogne-Franche-Comté, France

Crissey
- Commune
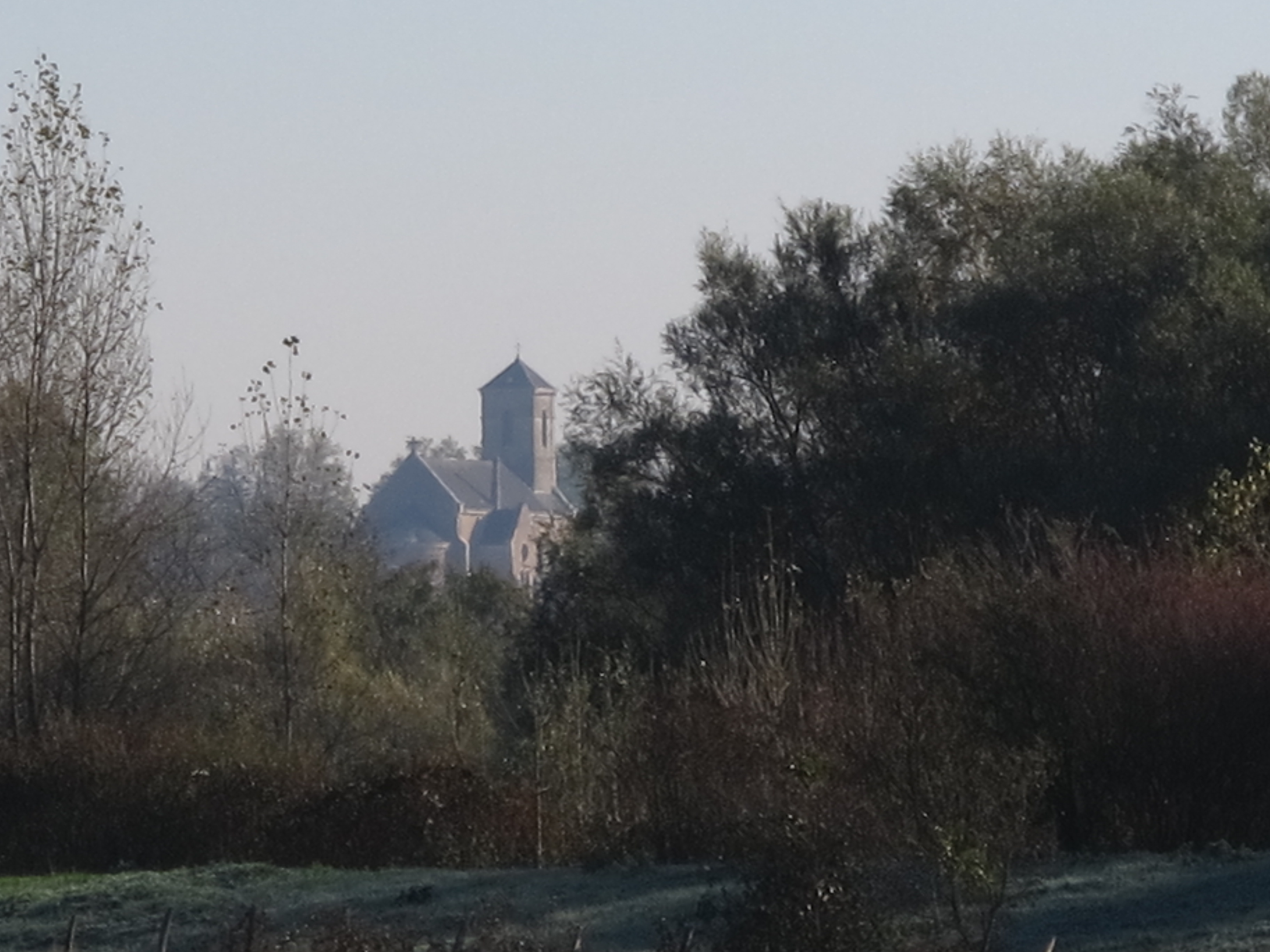
- The church in Crissey
- Location of Crissey
- Location within France Location within Bourgogne-Franche-Comté
- Coordinates: 47°04′07″N 5°29′03″E
- Country: France
- Region: Bourgogne-Franche-Comté
- Department: Jura
- Arrondissement: Dole
- Canton: Dole-2
- Intercommunality: CA Grand Dole

Government
  - Mayor (2020–2026): Gérard Chauchefoin
- Area^{1}: 4.81 km^{2} (1.86 sq mi)
- Highest elevation: 220 m (720 ft)
- Lowest elevation: 194 m (636 ft)
- Population (2023): 687
  - Density: 143/km^{2} (370/sq mi)
- Time zone: UTC+01:00 (CET)
  - Summer (DST): UTC+02:00 (CEST)
- INSEE/Postal code: 39182 /39100
- ^{1} French Land Register data, which excludes lakes, ponds, glaciers > 1 km^{2} (0.386 sq mi or 247 acres) and river estuaries.

Crissey (French pronunciation: [kʁisɛ]) is a commune in the Jura department in Bourgogne-Franche-Comté in eastern France.

== Population ==
Historical population
Year	Pop.	±% p.a.
1968	363	—
1975	384	+0.81%
1982	518	+4.37%
1990	572	+1.25%
1999	593	+0.40%
2007	648	+1.11%
2012	650	+0.06%
2017	653	+0.09%
2023	687	+0.85%
Source: INSEE

== See also ==
- Communes of the Jura department
