= Marais de Lavours National Nature Reserve =

Coordinates: 45°49′45″N 5°46′0″E

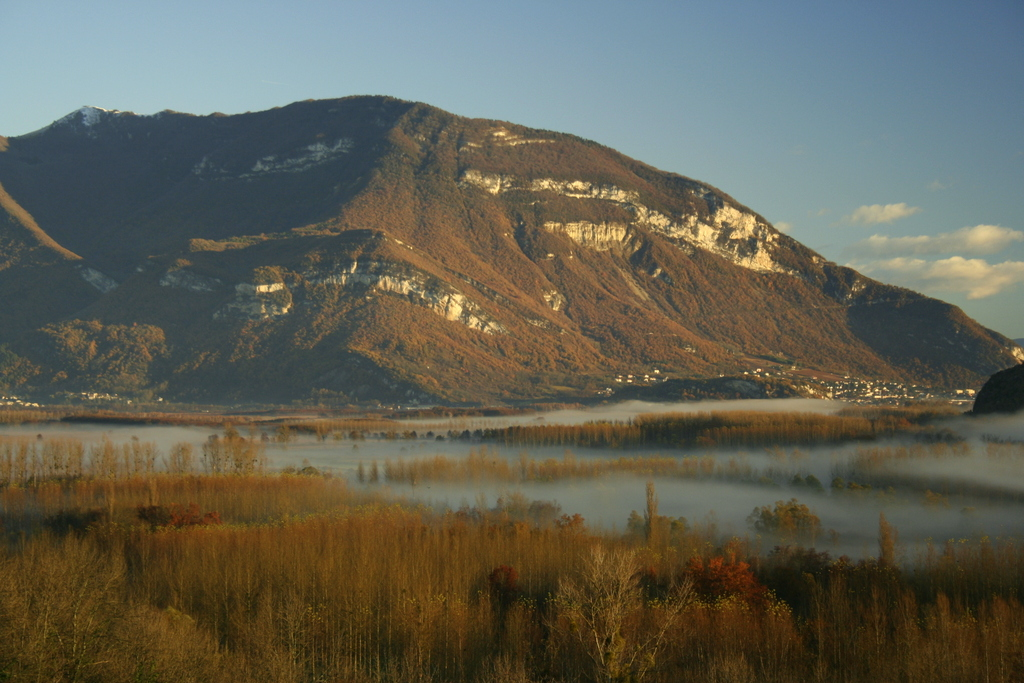
Mist over le marais de Lavours (view looking north). In the background the Grand Colombier, on the right Culoz

Le Marais de Lavours is a French nature reserve of 474 hectares (1,170 acres), it spans the communes of Culoz, Béon, Ceyzérieu, Flaxieu and Pollieu; in Ain, southeastern France. The reserve was created on 22 March 1984.
