= Parcey =

Commune in Bourgogne-Franche-Comté, France

- Commune
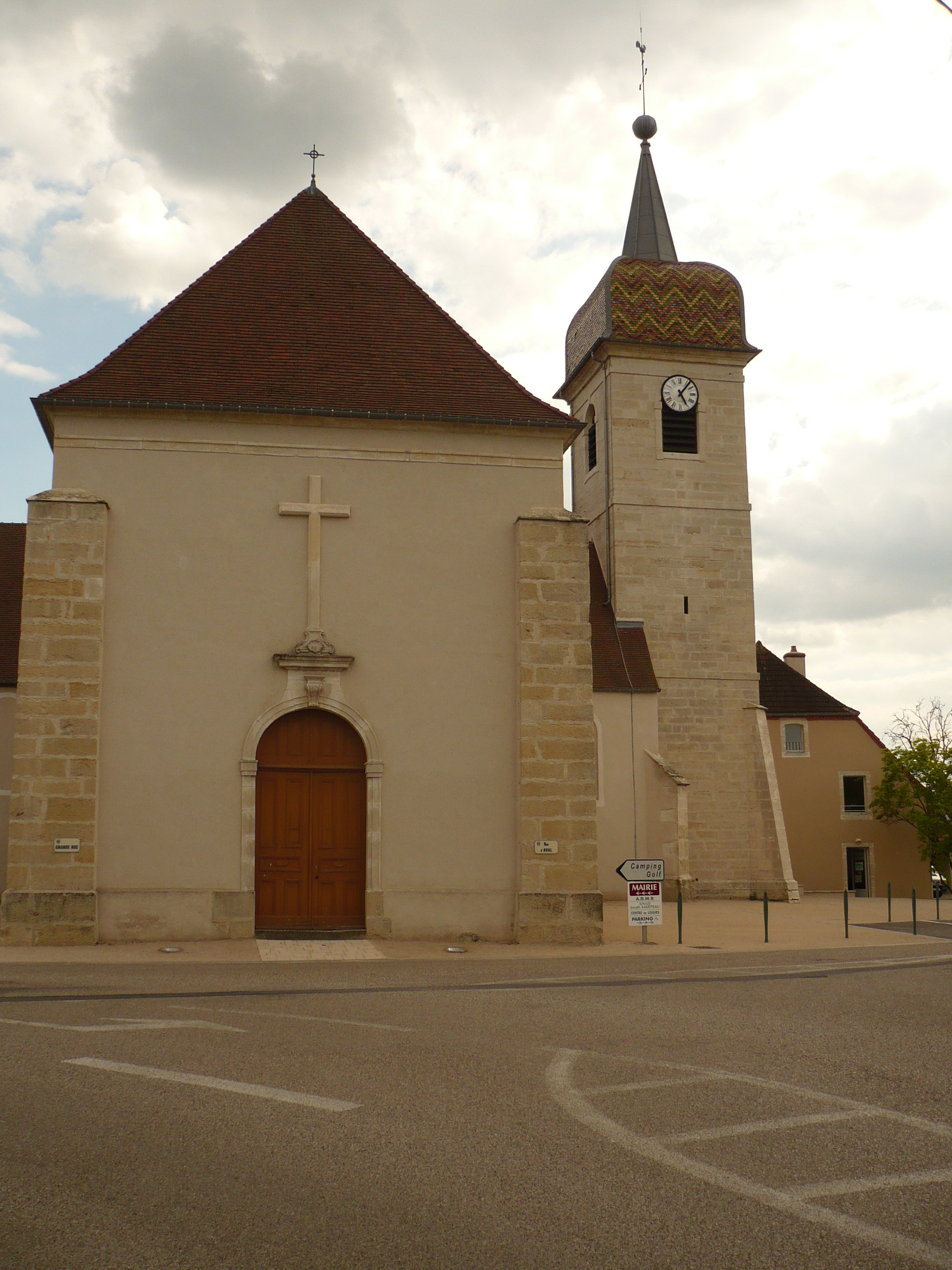
- The church in Parcey

- Coat of arms
- Location of Parcey
- Location within France Location within Bourgogne-Franche-Comté
- Coordinates: 47°01′24″N 5°29′15″E
- Country: France
- Region: Bourgogne-Franche-Comté
- Department: Jura
- Arrondissement: Dole
- Canton: Dole-2
- Intercommunality: CA Grand Dole

Government
  - Mayor (2020–2026): Céline Labourot
- Area^{1}: 8.94 km^{2} (3.45 sq mi)
- Highest elevation: 215 m (705 ft)
- Lowest elevation: 192 m (630 ft)
- Population (2023): 993
  - Density: 111/km^{2} (288/sq mi)
- Time zone: UTC+01:00 (CET)
  - Summer (DST): UTC+02:00 (CEST)
- INSEE/Postal code: 39405 /39100
- ^{1} French Land Register data, which excludes lakes, ponds, glaciers > 1 km^{2} (0.386 sq mi or 247 acres) and river estuaries.

Parcey (French pronunciation: [paʁsɛ]) is a commune in the Jura department in Bourgogne-Franche-Comté in eastern France.

== Population ==
Historical population
Year	Pop.	±% p.a.
1968	676	—
1975	659	−0.36%
1982	735	+1.57%
1990	818	+1.35%
1999	838	+0.27%
2007	939	+1.43%
2012	960	+0.44%
2017	974	+0.29%
2023	993	+0.32%
Source: INSEE

== See also ==
- Communes of the Jura department
