= Treschenu-Creyers =

- Part of Châtillon-en-Diois
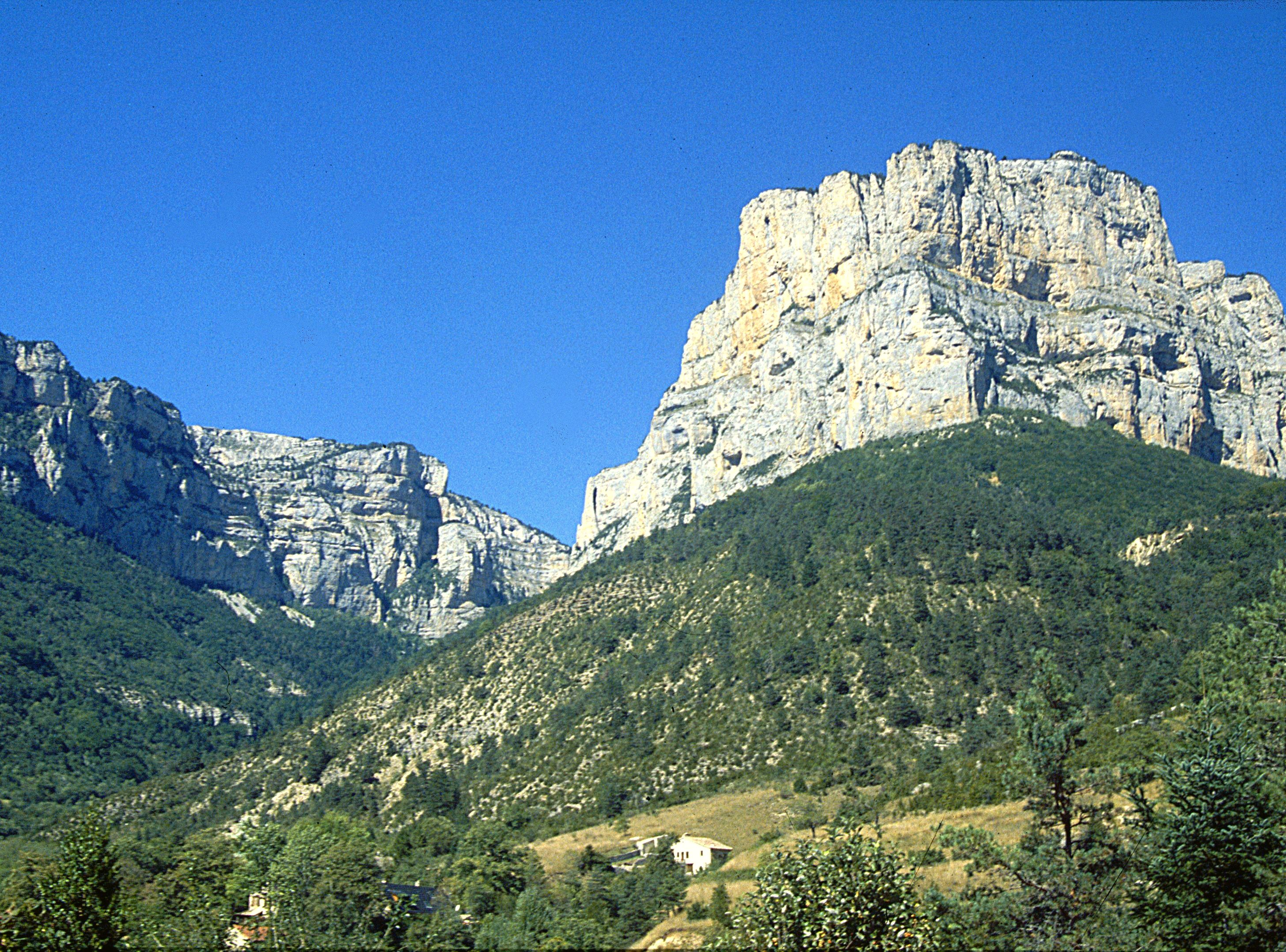
- The Cirque d'Archiane
- Location of Treschenu-Creyers
- Location within France Location within Auvergne-Rhône-Alpes
- Coordinates: 44°43′55″N 5°32′28″E
- Country: France
- Region: Auvergne-Rhône-Alpes
- Department: Drôme
- Arrondissement: Die
- Canton: Le Diois
- Commune: Châtillon-en-Diois
- Area^{1}: 82.04 km^{2} (31.68 sq mi)
- Highest elevation: 1,968 m (6,457 ft)
- Lowest elevation: 584 m (1,916 ft)
- Population (2023): 115
  - Density: 1.40/km^{2} (3.63/sq mi)
- Time zone: UTC+01:00 (CET)
  - Summer (DST): UTC+02:00 (CEST)
- Postal code: 26410
- ^{1} French Land Register data, which excludes lakes, ponds, glaciers > 1 km^{2} (0.386 sq mi or 247 acres) and river estuaries.

Treschenu-Creyers (Vivaro-Alpine: Treschanuts e Creiers) is a former commune in the Drôme department in southeastern France. On 1 January 2019, it was merged into the commune Châtillon-en-Diois.

== See also ==
- Communes of the Drôme department
- Parc naturel régional du Vercors
