= Gevry =

Commune in Bourgogne-Franche-Comté, France

- Commune
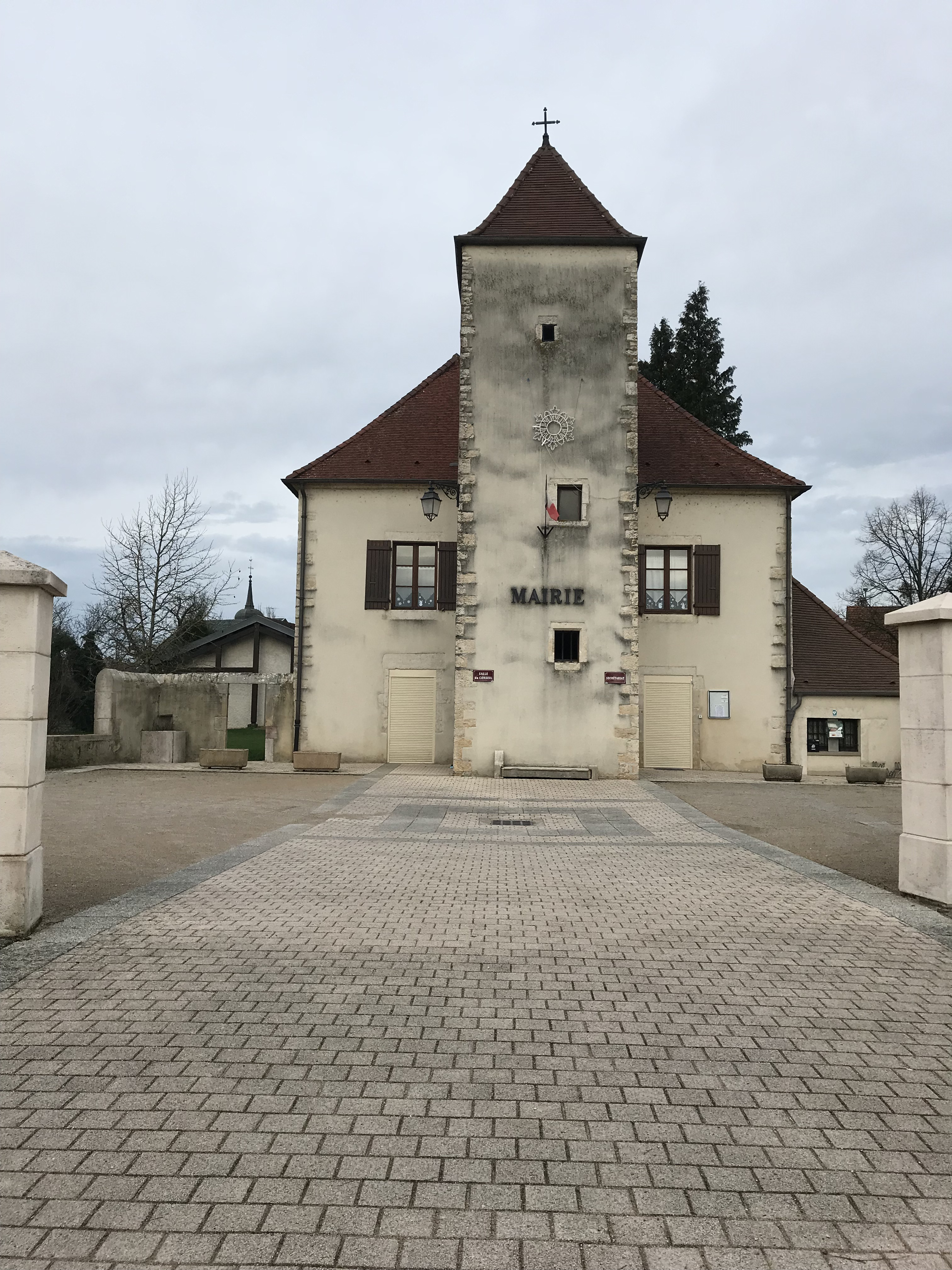
- The town hall in Gevry

- Coat of arms
- Location of Gevry
- Location within France Location within Bourgogne-Franche-Comté
- Coordinates: 47°02′24″N 5°26′37″E
- Country: France
- Region: Bourgogne-Franche-Comté
- Department: Jura
- Arrondissement: Dole
- Canton: Dole-2
- Intercommunality: CA Grand Dole

Government
  - Mayor (2020–2026): Thomas Ryat
- Area^{1}: 5.31 km^{2} (2.05 sq mi)
- Highest elevation: 198 m (650 ft)
- Lowest elevation: 192 m (630 ft)
- Population (2023): 721
  - Density: 136/km^{2} (352/sq mi)
- Time zone: UTC+01:00 (CET)
  - Summer (DST): UTC+02:00 (CEST)
- INSEE/Postal code: 39252 /39100
- ^{1} French Land Register data, which excludes lakes, ponds, glaciers > 1 km^{2} (0.386 sq mi or 247 acres) and river estuaries.

Gevry (French pronunciation: [ʒəvʁi]) is a commune in the Jura department in Bourgogne-Franche-Comté in eastern France.

== Population ==
Historical population
Year	Pop.	±% p.a.
1968	417	—
1975	498	+2.57%
1982	628	+3.37%
1990	595	−0.67%
1999	626	+0.57%
2007	632	+0.12%
2012	668	+1.11%
2017	692	+0.71%
2023	721	+0.69%
Source: INSEE

== See also ==
- Communes of the Jura department
