= Sagnes de la Godivelle National Nature Reserve =

Protected area in France

- IUCN category IV (habitat/species management area)
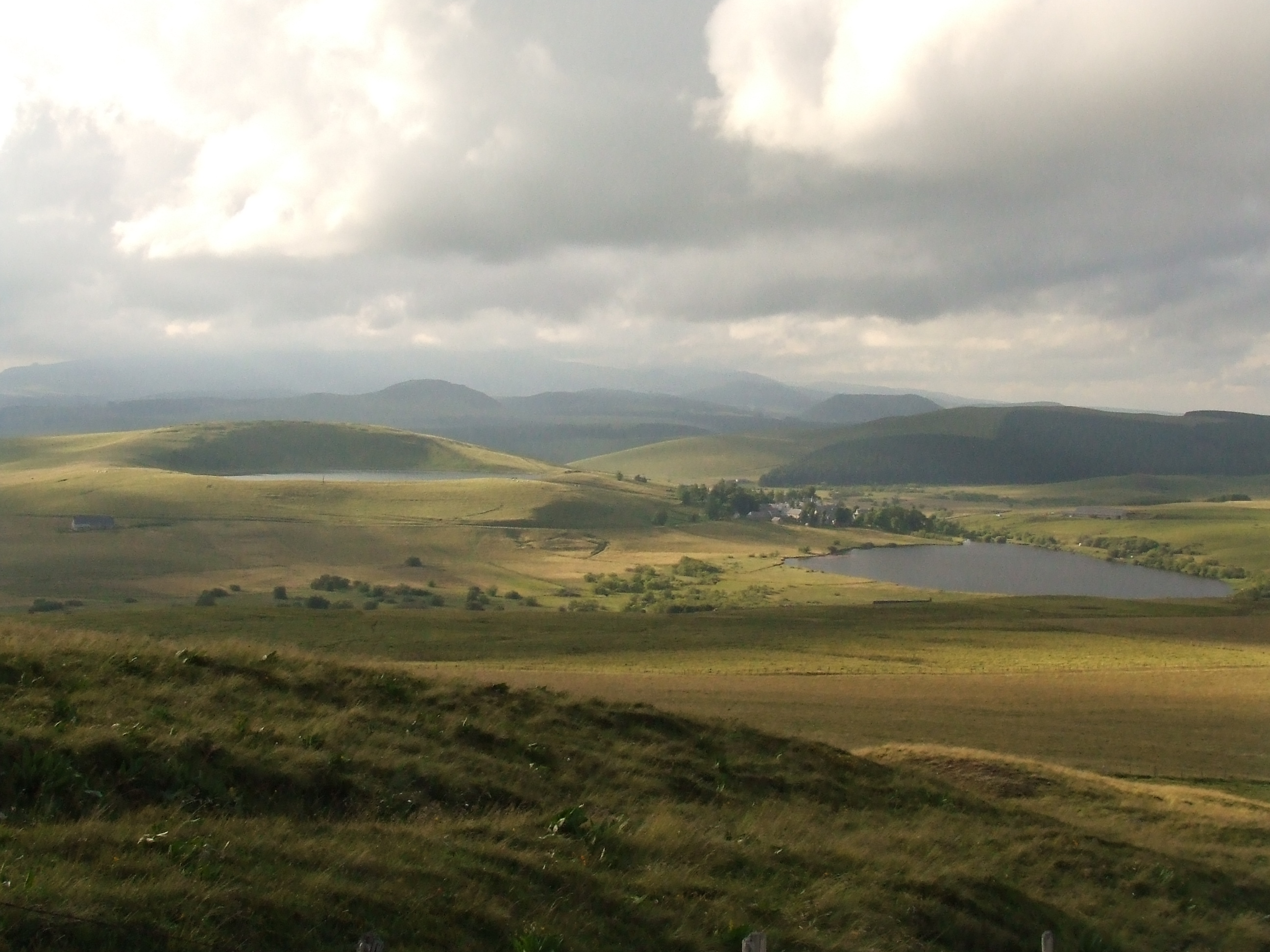
- La Godivelle and its two lakes: on the left, Lac-d'en-Haut, on the right Lac-d'en-Bas bordered by the peat bog, classified in 1975 as a national nature reserve
- Interactive map of Sagnes de la Godivelle National Nature Reserve
- Location: Puy-de-Dôme, France
- Nearest city: La Godivelle
- Coordinates: 45°23′4″N 2°55′25″E
- Area: 24 ha (59 acres)
- Established: 27 June 1975
- Visitors: 2646 (in 2005)
- Governing body: Auvergne Regional Volcanic National Parks

The Sagnes de la Godivelle National Nature Reserve is a natural reserve located in La Godivelle, France. It was created on June 27, 1975 and is made up of 24 hectares of wetland habitats.
