= Châtillon-en-Diois =

- Commune
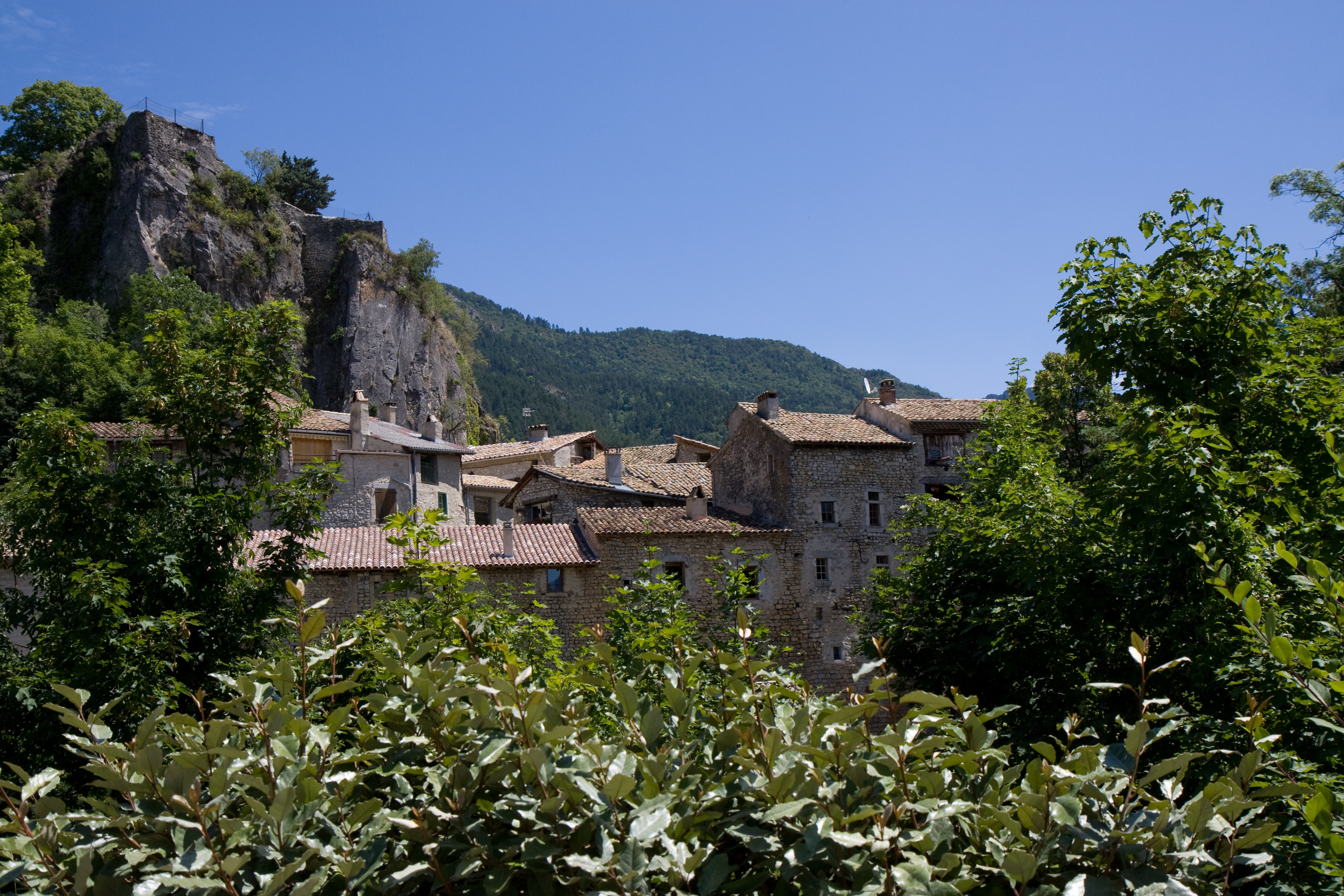
- The village of Chatillôn-en-Diois

- Coat of arms
- Location of Châtillon-en-Diois
- Location within France Location within Auvergne-Rhône-Alpes
- Coordinates: 44°41′44″N 5°29′05″E
- Country: France
- Region: Auvergne-Rhône-Alpes
- Department: Drôme
- Arrondissement: Die
- Canton: Le Diois
- Intercommunality: Diois

Government
  - Mayor (2020–2026): Éric Vanoni
- Area^{1}: 110.06 km^{2} (42.49 sq mi)
- Highest elevation: 2,038 m (6,686 ft)
- Lowest elevation: 514 m (1,686 ft)
- Population (2023): 669
  - Density: 6.08/km^{2} (15.7/sq mi)
- Time zone: UTC+01:00 (CET)
  - Summer (DST): UTC+02:00 (CEST)
- INSEE/Postal code: 26086 /26410
- ^{1} French Land Register data, which excludes lakes, ponds, glaciers > 1 km^{2} (0.386 sq mi or 247 acres) and river estuaries.

Châtillon-en-Diois is a commune in the Drôme department in southeastern France. It is a member of Les Plus Beaux Villages de France (The Most Beautiful Villages of France) Association. On 1 January 2019, the former commune Treschenu-Creyers was merged into Châtillon-en-Diois.

== Population ==
Historical population
Year	Pop.	±% p.a.
1968	683	—
1975	623	−1.30%
1982	666	+0.96%
1990	641	−0.48%
1999	631	−0.17%
2007	700	+1.31%
2012	691	−0.26%
2017	666	−0.73%
2023	669	+0.07%
Source: INSEE

Population data refer to the area corresponding with the commune as of January 2025.

== See also ==
- Communes of the Drôme department
- Parc naturel régional du Vercors
