= Mazoires =

- Commune
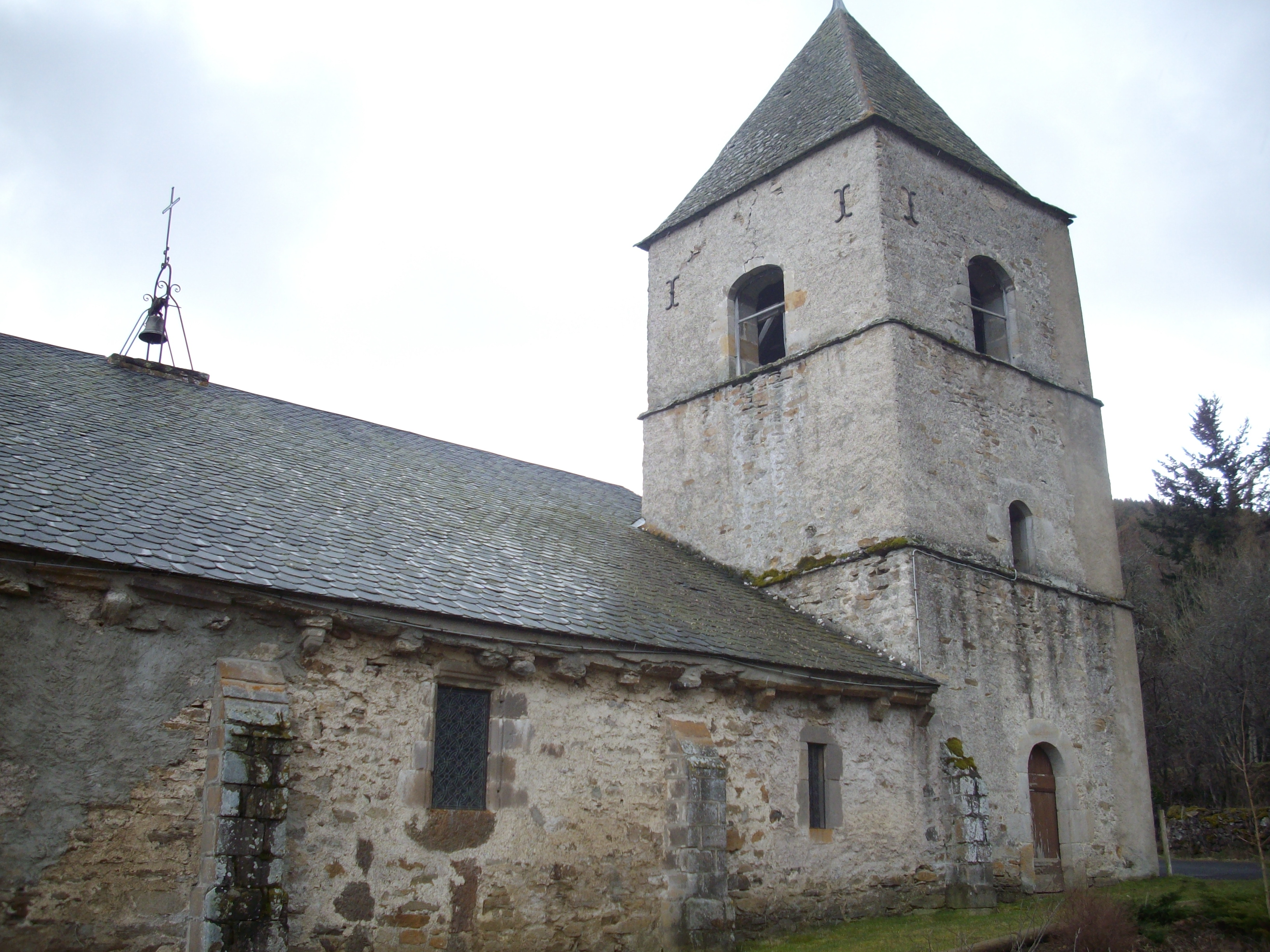
- The church in Mazoires
- Location of Mazoires
- Location within France Location within Auvergne-Rhône-Alpes
- Coordinates: 45°23′44″N 3°02′40″E
- Country: France
- Region: Auvergne-Rhône-Alpes
- Department: Puy-de-Dôme
- Arrondissement: Issoire
- Canton: Brassac-les-Mines
- Intercommunality: Agglo Pays d'Issoire

Government
  - Mayor (2026–32): Frédéric Chabrillat
- Area^{1}: 42.19 km^{2} (16.29 sq mi)
- Elevation: 990 m (3,250 ft)
- Highest elevation: 1,291 m (4,236 ft)
- Lowest elevation: 640 m (2,100 ft)
- Population (2023): 97
  - Density: 2.3/km^{2} (6.0/sq mi)
- Time zone: UTC+01:00 (CET)
  - Summer (DST): UTC+02:00 (CEST)
- INSEE/Postal code: 63220 /63420
- ^{1} French Land Register data, which excludes lakes, ponds, glaciers > 1 km^{2} (0.386 sq mi or 247 acres) and river estuaries.

Mazoires (French pronunciation: [mazwaʁ]; Occitan: Masoira) is a commune in the Puy-de-Dôme department in Auvergne in central France.

== See also ==
- Communes of the Puy-de-Dôme department
