= La Godivelle =

- Commune
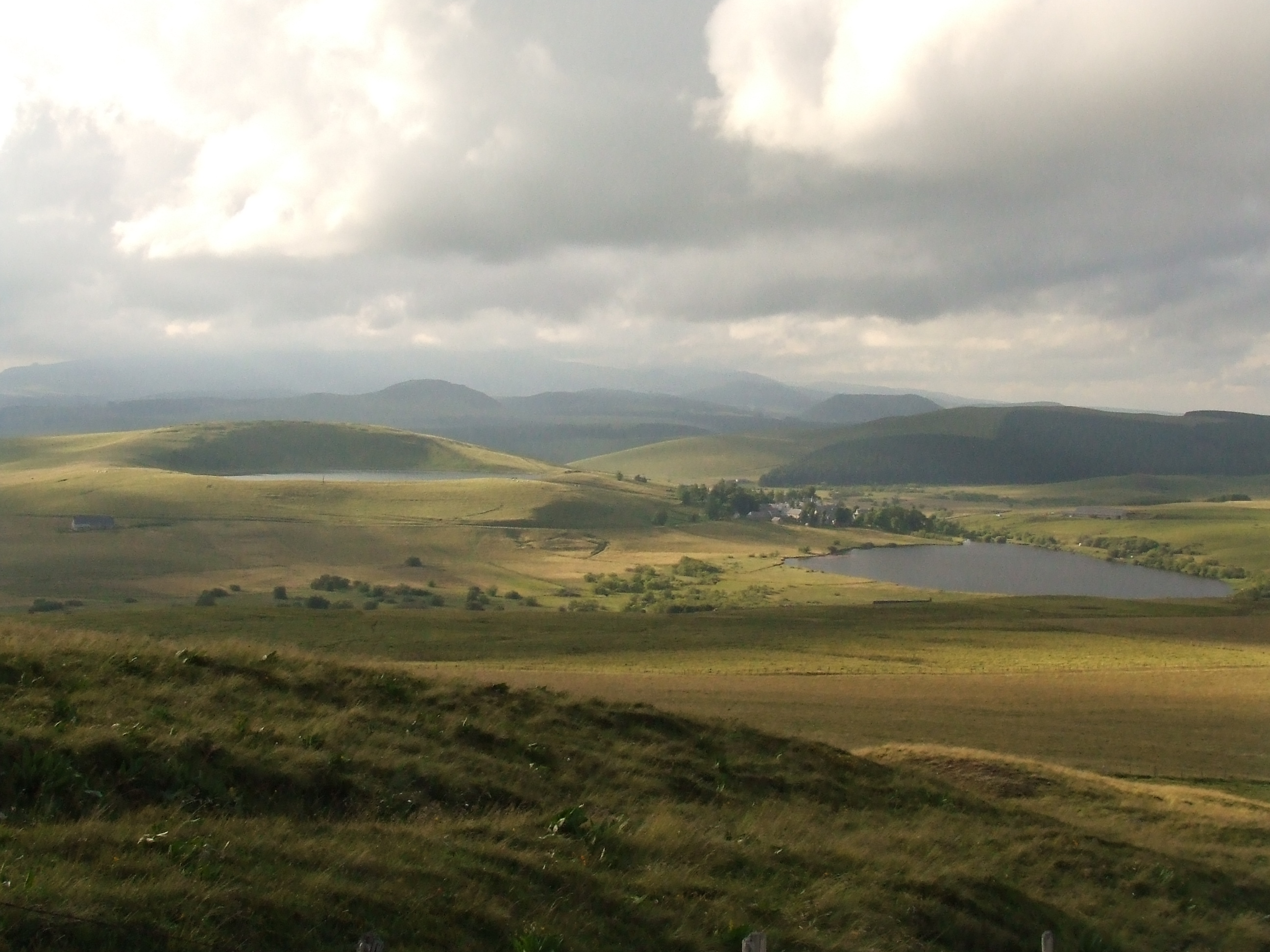
- La Godivelle and its two lakes

- Coat of arms
- Location of La Godivelle
- Location within France Location within Auvergne-Rhône-Alpes
- Coordinates: 45°23′22″N 2°55′24″E
- Country: France
- Region: Auvergne-Rhône-Alpes
- Department: Puy-de-Dôme
- Arrondissement: Issoire
- Canton: Brassac-les-Mines
- Intercommunality: Massif du Sancy

Government
  - Mayor (2026–32): Jocelyne Mansana
- Area^{1}: 15.44 km^{2} (5.96 sq mi)
- Elevation: 1,203 m (3,947 ft)
- Highest elevation: 1,377 m (4,518 ft)
- Lowest elevation: 1,076 m (3,530 ft)
- Population (2023): 19
  - Density: 1.2/km^{2} (3.2/sq mi)
- Time zone: UTC+01:00 (CET)
  - Summer (DST): UTC+02:00 (CEST)
- INSEE/Postal code: 63169 /63850
- ^{1} French Land Register data, which excludes lakes, ponds, glaciers > 1 km^{2} (0.386 sq mi or 247 acres) and river estuaries.

La Godivelle (French pronunciation: [la ɡɔdivɛl]) is a commune in the Puy-de-Dôme department in Auvergne in central France.

== Population ==
Historical population
Year	Pop.	±% p.a.
1968	106	—
1975	70	−5.76%
1982	62	−1.72%
1990	38	−5.94%
1999	27	−3.73%
2007	22	−2.53%
2012	21	−0.93%
2017	14	−7.79%
2023	19	+5.22%
Source: INSEE

== See also ==
- Communes of the Puy-de-Dôme department
- Sagnes de la Godivelle National Nature Reserve
