= Mailly-le-Château =

- Commune
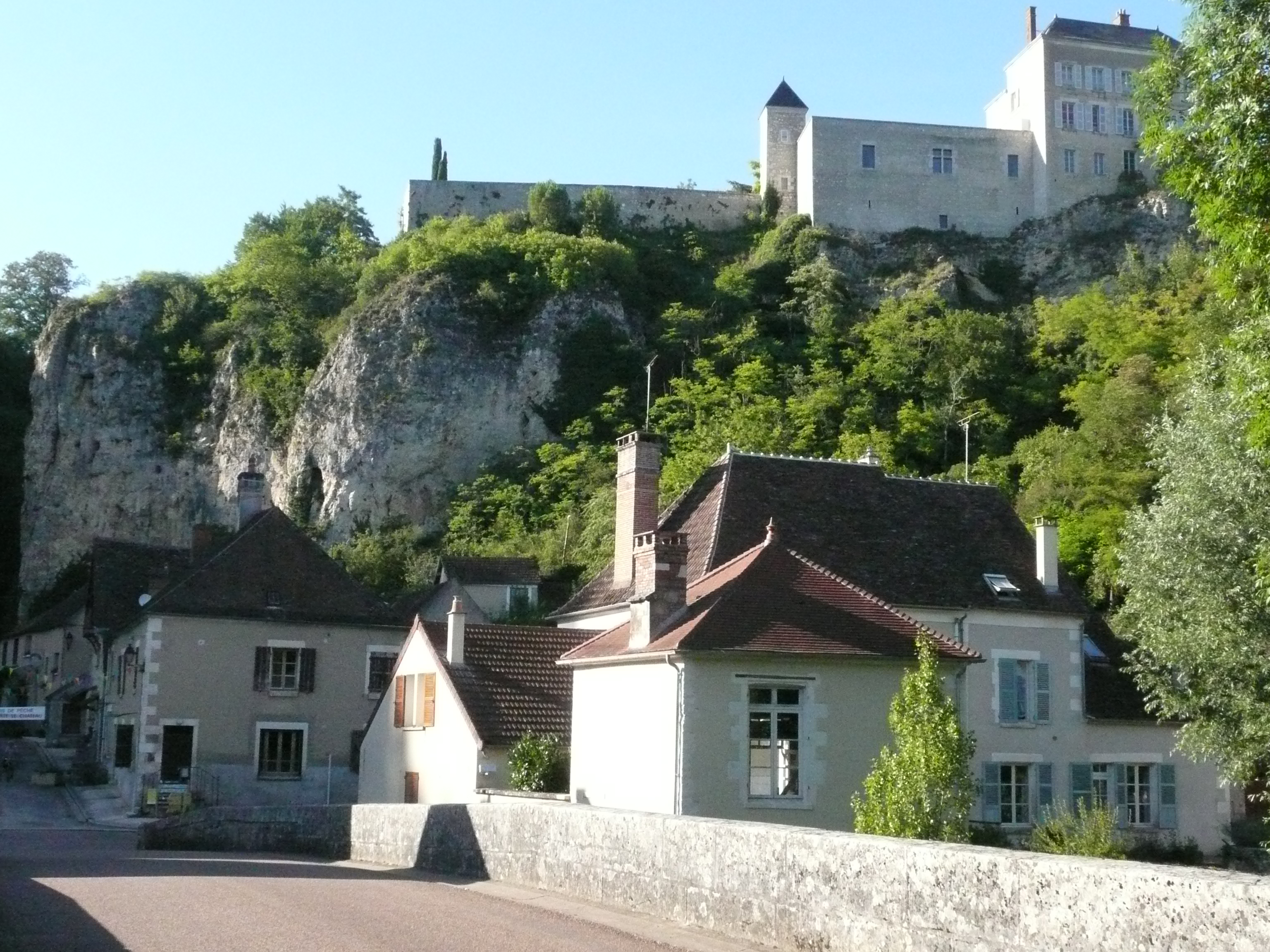
- The village from the river Yonne

- Coat of arms
- Location of Mailly-le-Château
- Location within France Location within Bourgogne-Franche-Comté
- Coordinates: 47°35′49″N 3°38′11″E
- Country: France
- Region: Bourgogne-Franche-Comté
- Department: Yonne
- Arrondissement: Auxerre
- Canton: Joux-la-Ville

Government
  - Mayor (2020–2026): Jean-Michel Godefroy
- Area^{1}: 37.28 km^{2} (14.39 sq mi)
- Highest elevation: 254 m (833 ft)
- Lowest elevation: 117 m (384 ft)
- Population (2023): 514
  - Density: 13.8/km^{2} (35.7/sq mi)
- Time zone: UTC+01:00 (CET)
  - Summer (DST): UTC+02:00 (CEST)
- INSEE/Postal code: 89238 /89660
- ^{1} French Land Register data, which excludes lakes, ponds, glaciers > 1 km^{2} (0.386 sq mi or 247 acres) and river estuaries.

Mailly-le-Château (French pronunciation: [maji l(ə) ʃɑto]) is a commune in the Yonne department in Bourgogne-Franche-Comté in north-central France. The lower village is on the left bank of the river Yonne, adjacent to the Canal du Nivernais. The upper village is noted for its 14th-century fortified castle and the 13th-century church of St Adrian.

== See also ==
- Communes of the Yonne department

== Gallery ==
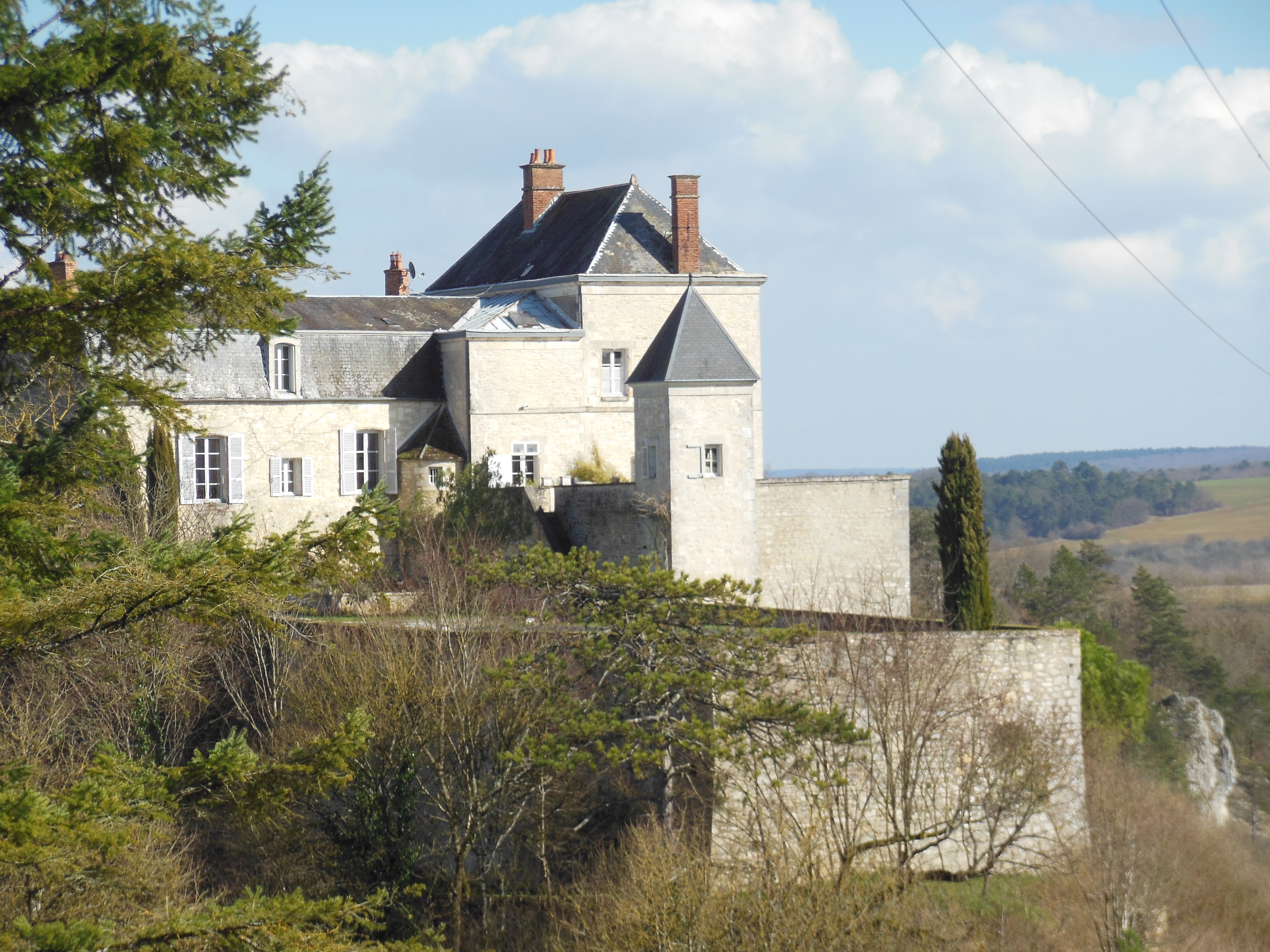
14th-century castle keep

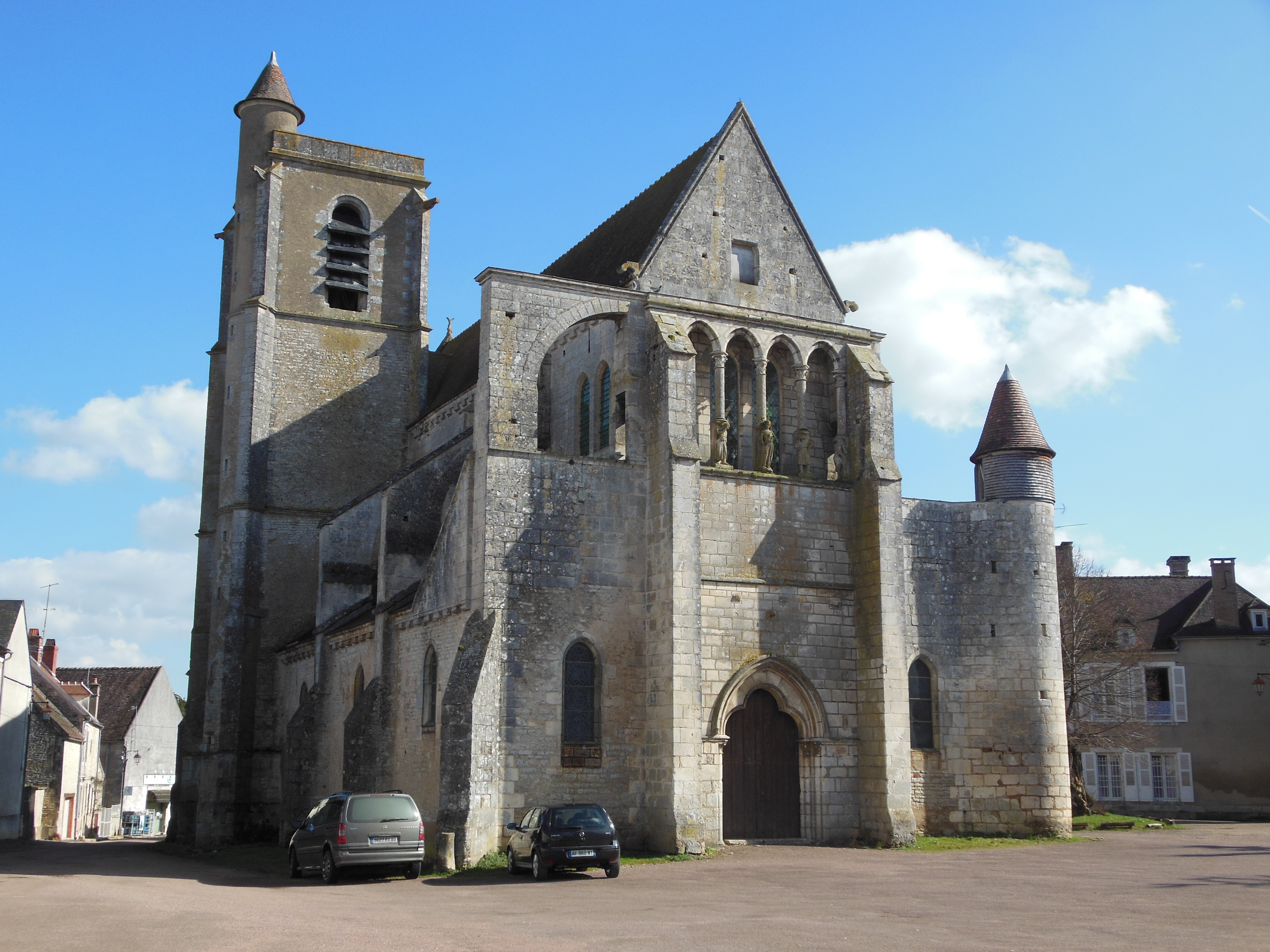
St Adrian's Church (13th century)

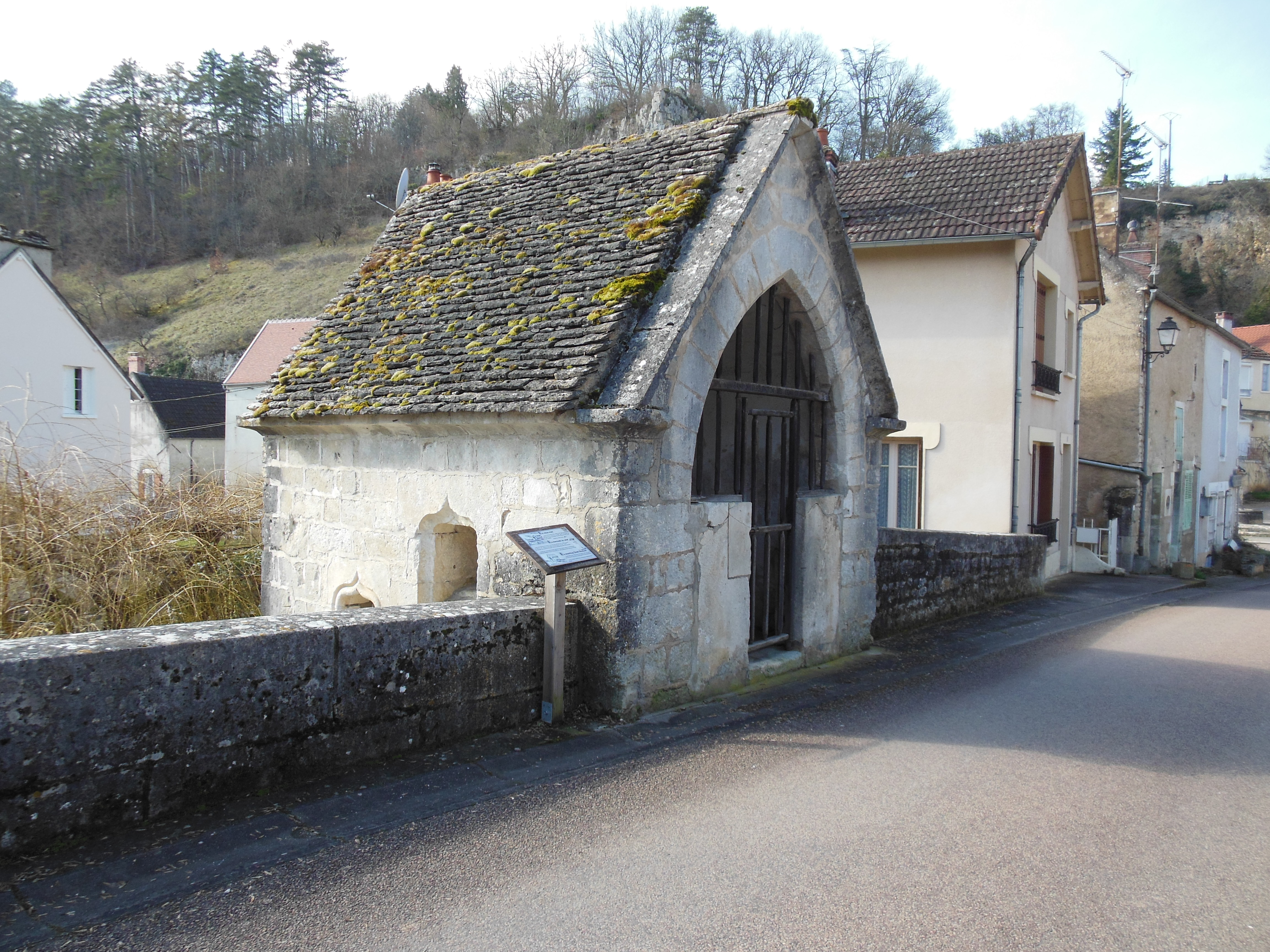
St Nicholas' Chapel (15th century)

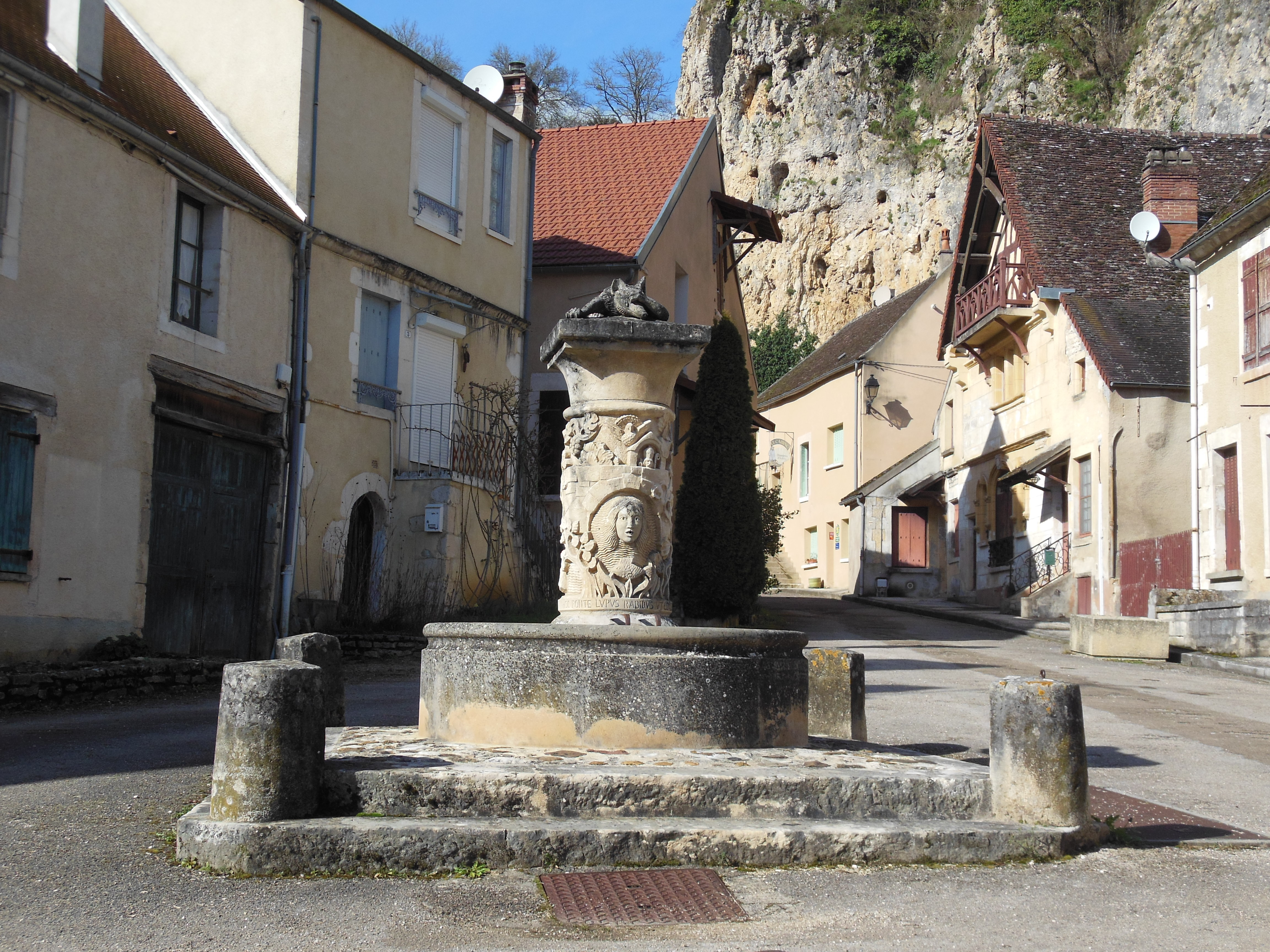
Fontaine au Loup

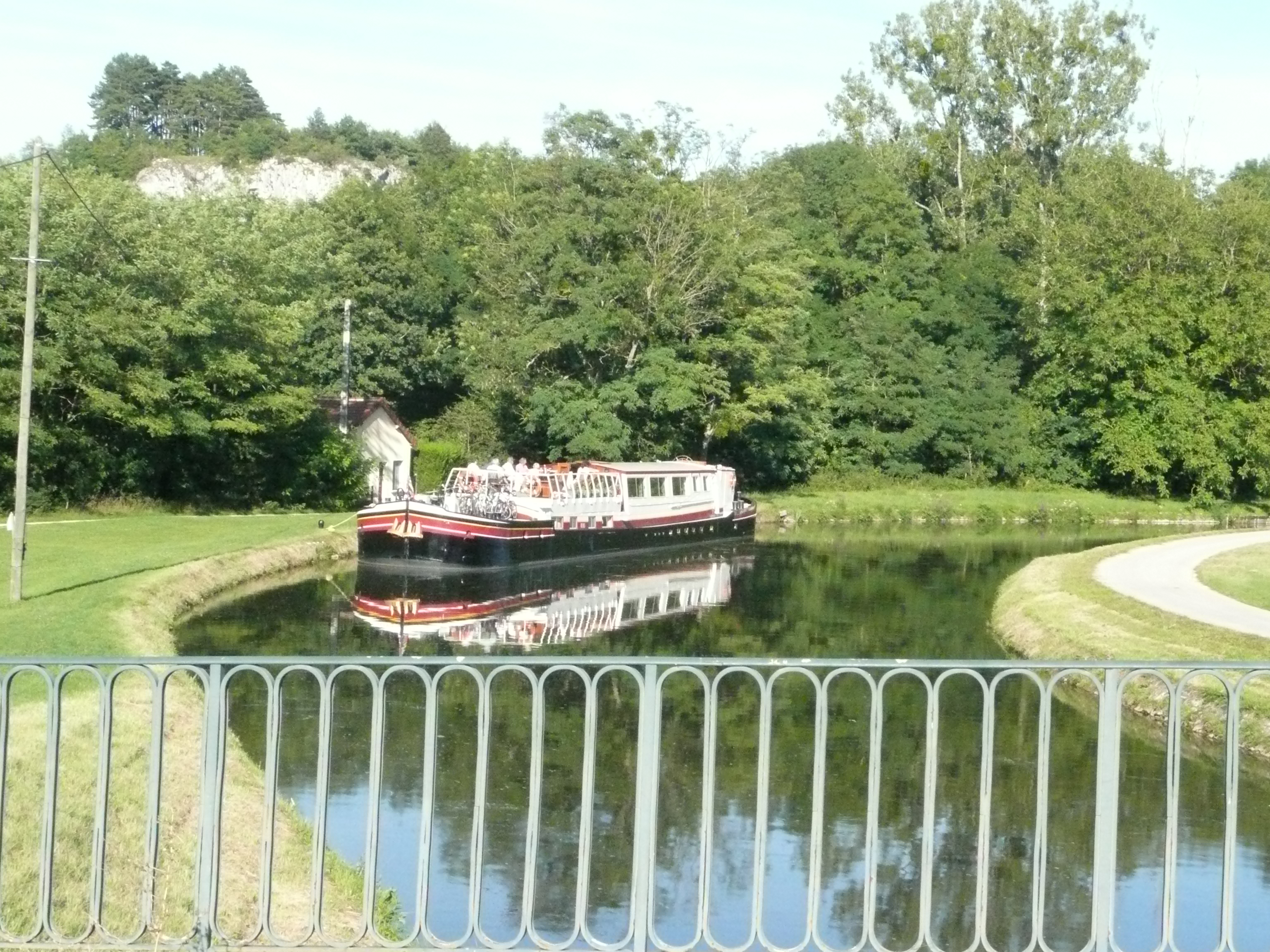
A hotel barge on the Nivernais Canal
