= Beaurecueil =

Commune in Provence-Alpes-Côte d'Azur, France

- Commune
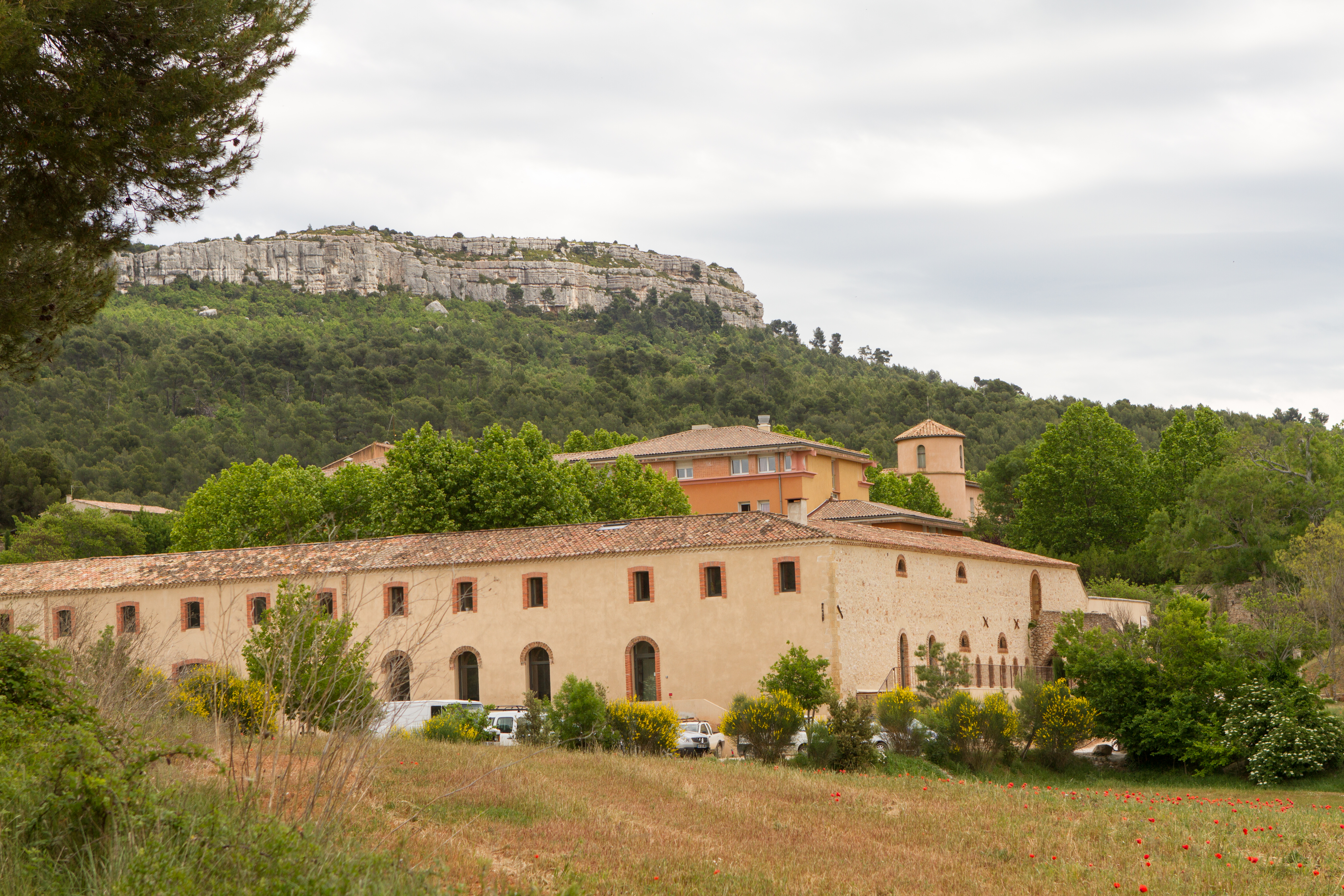
- The château in Beaurecueil

- Coat of arms
- Location of Beaurecueil
- Location within France Location within Provence-Alpes-Côte d'Azur
- Coordinates: 43°30′41″N 5°32′42″E
- Country: France
- Region: Provence-Alpes-Côte d'Azur
- Department: Bouches-du-Rhône
- Arrondissement: Aix-en-Provence
- Canton: Trets
- Intercommunality: Aix-Marseille-Provence

Government
  - Mayor (2026–32): Sarah Coulomb
- Area^{1}: 9.86 km^{2} (3.81 sq mi)
- Elevation: 218 m (715 ft)
- Highest elevation: 660 m (2,170 ft)
- Lowest elevation: 199 m (653 ft)
- Population (2023): 585
  - Density: 59.3/km^{2} (154/sq mi)
- Time zone: UTC+01:00 (CET)
  - Summer (DST): UTC+02:00 (CEST)
- INSEE/Postal code: 13012 /13100
- ^{1} French Land Register data, which excludes lakes, ponds, glaciers > 1 km^{2} (0.386 sq mi or 247 acres) and river estuaries.

Beaurecueil (French pronunciation: [boʁkœj]; Occitan: Beurecuelh) is a commune in the Bouches-du-Rhône department in southern France.

== Population ==
Historical population
Year	Pop.	±% p.a.
1968	259	—
1975	391	+6.06%
1982	458	+2.29%
1990	510	+1.35%
1999	568	+1.20%
2007	610	+0.90%
2012	551	−2.01%
2017	582	+1.10%
2023	585	+0.09%
Source: INSEE

== See also ==
- Communes of the Bouches-du-Rhône department
