= Brégnier-Cordon =

Commune in Auvergne-Rhône-Alpes, France

- Commune
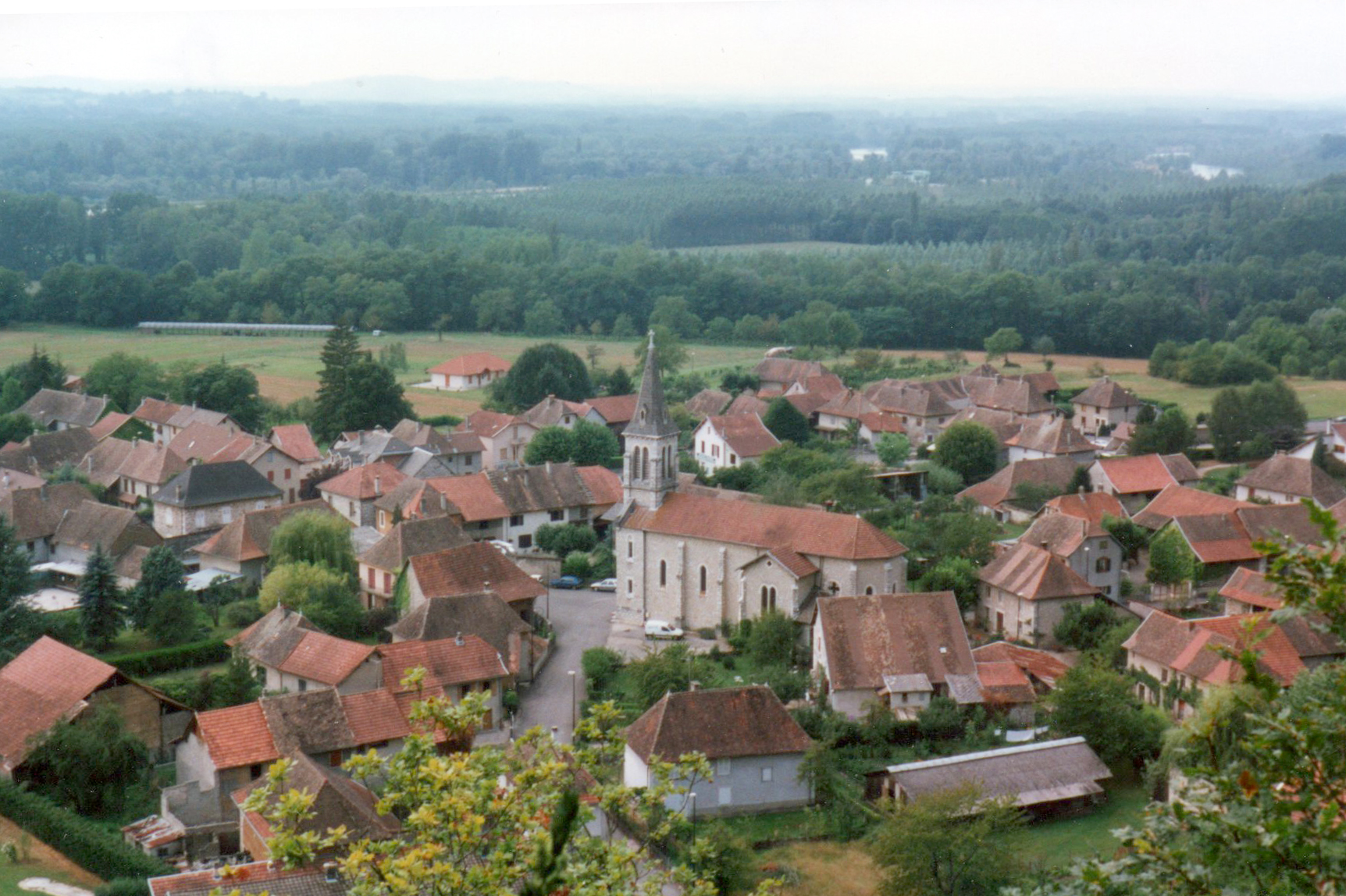

- Coat of arms
- Location of Brégnier-Cordon
- Location within France Location within Auvergne-Rhône-Alpes
- Coordinates: 45°39′00″N 5°37′00″E
- Country: France
- Region: Auvergne-Rhône-Alpes
- Department: Ain
- Arrondissement: Belley
- Canton: Belley
- Intercommunality: Bugey Sud

Government
  - Mayor (2026–32): Thierry Vergain
- Area^{1}: 11.05 km^{2} (4.27 sq mi)
- Elevation: 226 m (741 ft)
- Highest elevation: 460 m (1,510 ft)
- Lowest elevation: 203 m (666 ft)
- Population (2023): 804
  - Density: 72.8/km^{2} (188/sq mi)
- Time zone: UTC+01:00 (CET)
  - Summer (DST): UTC+02:00 (CEST)
- INSEE/Postal code: 01058 /01300
- Website: https://www.bregnier-cordon.fr/
- ^{1} French Land Register data, which excludes lakes, ponds, glaciers > 1 km^{2} (0.386 sq mi or 247 acres) and river estuaries.

Brégnier-Cordon (French pronunciation: [bʁeɲe kɔʁdɔ̃]) is a commune in the Ain department in eastern France.

== Geography ==
Brégnier-Cordon lies 20 km south of Belley. It is located in a bend of the Rhône on the edge of Savoie (on the southeast) and Isère (on the west). The bridge at Cordon joins the commune to Aoste, in the Isère department. It borders the communes of Groslée-Saint-Benoît, Prémeyzel, Izieu, Murs-et-Gélignieux, Champagneux, Saint-Genix-les-Villages, Aoste and Les Avenières-Veyrins-Thuellin.

The territory of the commune lies principally in the plain of the Rhône at the foot of the Jura Mountains. On the north, it is bordered by the Gland.

The Lake and Falls of Glandieu are located in the commune near the hamlet of the same name.

== Population ==
Historical population
Year	Pop.	±% p.a.
1968	502	—
1975	442	−1.80%
1982	502	+1.84%
1990	511	+0.22%
1999	566	+1.14%
2007	699	+2.67%
2012	889	+4.93%
2017	839	−1.15%
2023	804	−0.71%
Source: INSEE

== Transportation ==
The commune is on the D19 highway coming from Sault-Brénaz and going to the northwest. This becomes the D992 south of the commune and heads north toward Belley. The D10 passes north of the commune, connecting the D19 to the D992 without following the Rhône.

The closest motorway is the A43, accessed at the Chimilin–Les Abrets exit a few kilometers south of the commune.

== Sights ==
- Château de la Barre
- Ruins of the feudal Château de Cordon
- Stone bridge over the Rhône
- Memorial to deported Jewish children
- Dam and hydroelectric power station on the Rhône
- Grotte de Liévrin : prehistoric cave classified as a monument historique in 1913
- Grotte de la Bonne Femme : natural cavity cut into the north flank of Cordon hill, occupied in Paleolithic times and a monument historique since 1913
- Cascade de Glandieu : waterfall

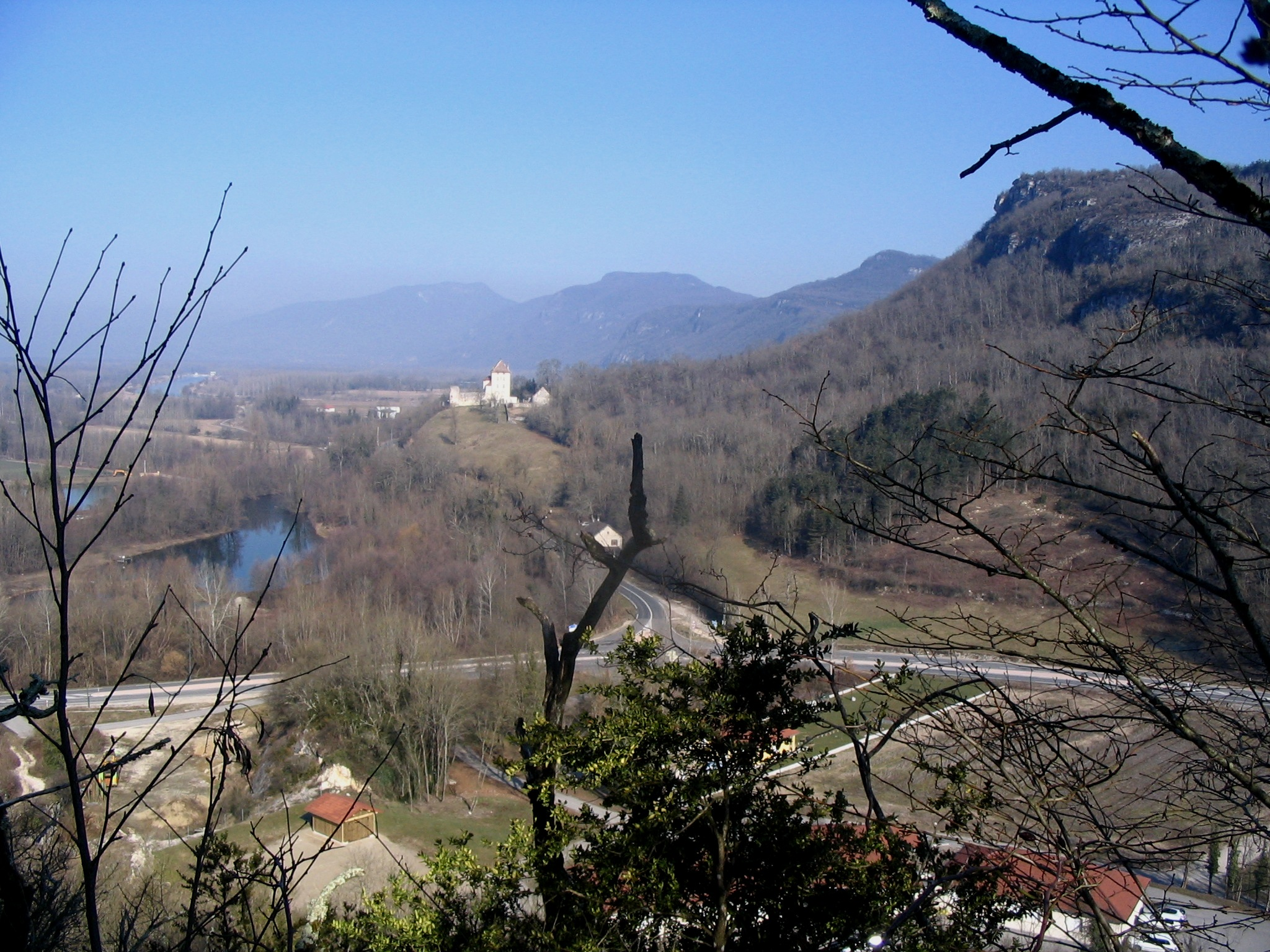
View from the Chateau of Barre

== See also ==
- Communes of the Ain department
