= Saint-Benoît, Ain =

Part of Groslée-Saint-Benoît in Auvergne-Rhône-Alpes, France

Saint-Benoit
- Part of Groslée-Saint-Benoît
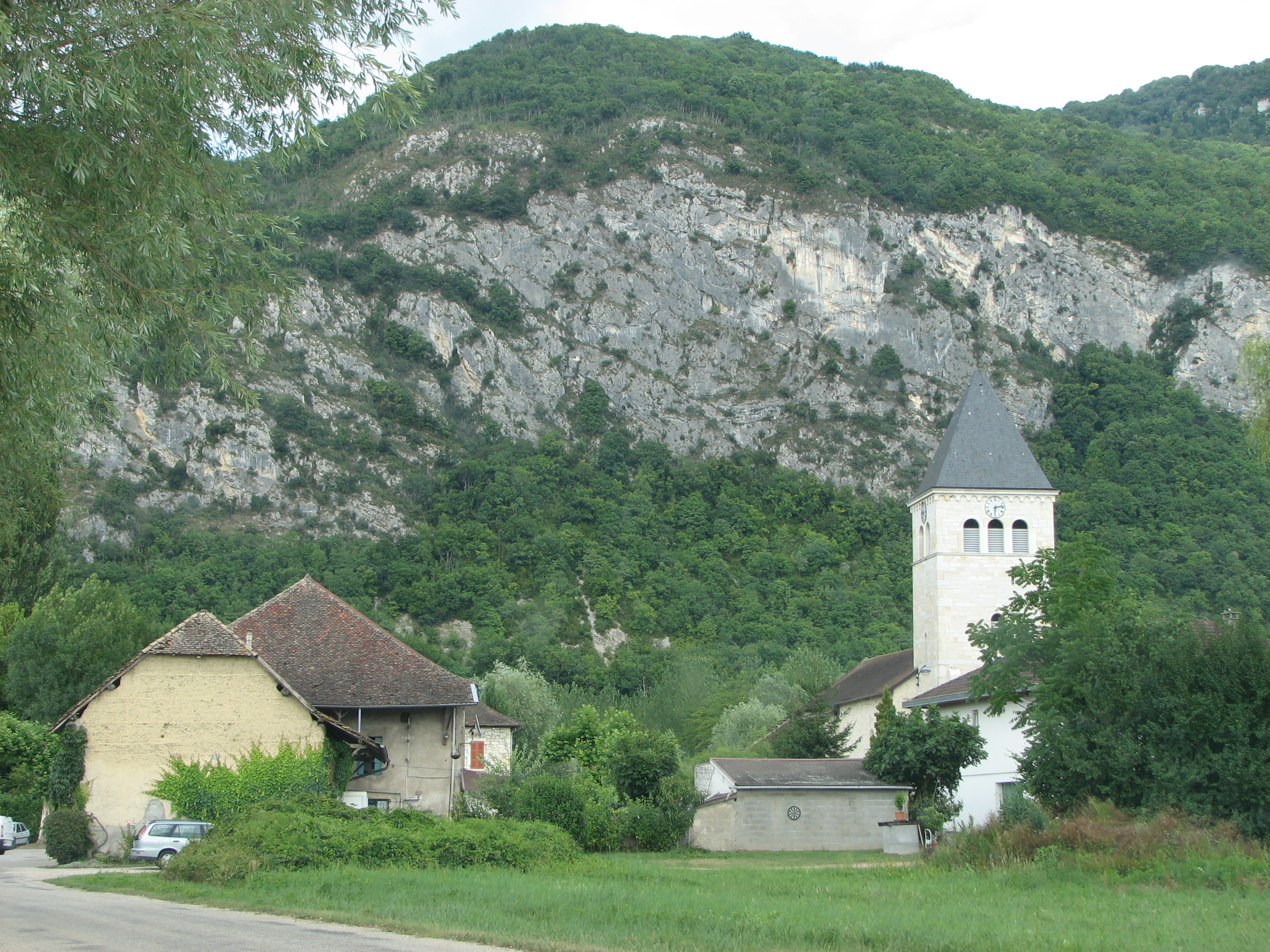
- Location of Saint-Benoit
- Location within France Location within Auvergne-Rhône-Alpes
- Coordinates: 45°42′00″N 5°35′00″E
- Country: France
- Region: Auvergne-Rhône-Alpes
- Department: Ain
- Arrondissement: Belley
- Canton: Belley
- Commune: Groslée-Saint-Benoît
- Area^{1}: 21.65 km^{2} (8.36 sq mi)
- Elevation: 206 m (676 ft)
- Highest elevation: 778 m (2,552 ft)
- Lowest elevation: 201 m (659 ft)
- Population (2022): 912
  - Density: 42.1/km^{2} (109/sq mi)
- Time zone: UTC+01:00 (CET)
  - Summer (DST): UTC+02:00 (CEST)
- Postal code: 01300
- ^{1} French Land Register data, which excludes lakes, ponds, glaciers > 1 km^{2} (0.386 sq mi or 247 acres) and river estuaries.

Saint-Benoit (French pronunciation: [sɛ̃ bənwa]; Arpitan: Sent-Benimo) is a former commune in the Ain department in eastern France. On 1 January 2016, it was merged into the new commune Groslée-Saint-Benoît.

== Population ==
Historical population
Year	Pop.	±% p.a.
2006	705	—
2011	792	+2.35%
2022	912	+1.29%
Source: INSEE

== See also ==
- Communes of the Ain department
- Glandieu Fall
- Glandieu
