= Les Avenières =

Commune in Isère, France

- Part of Les Avenières-Veyrins-Thuellin
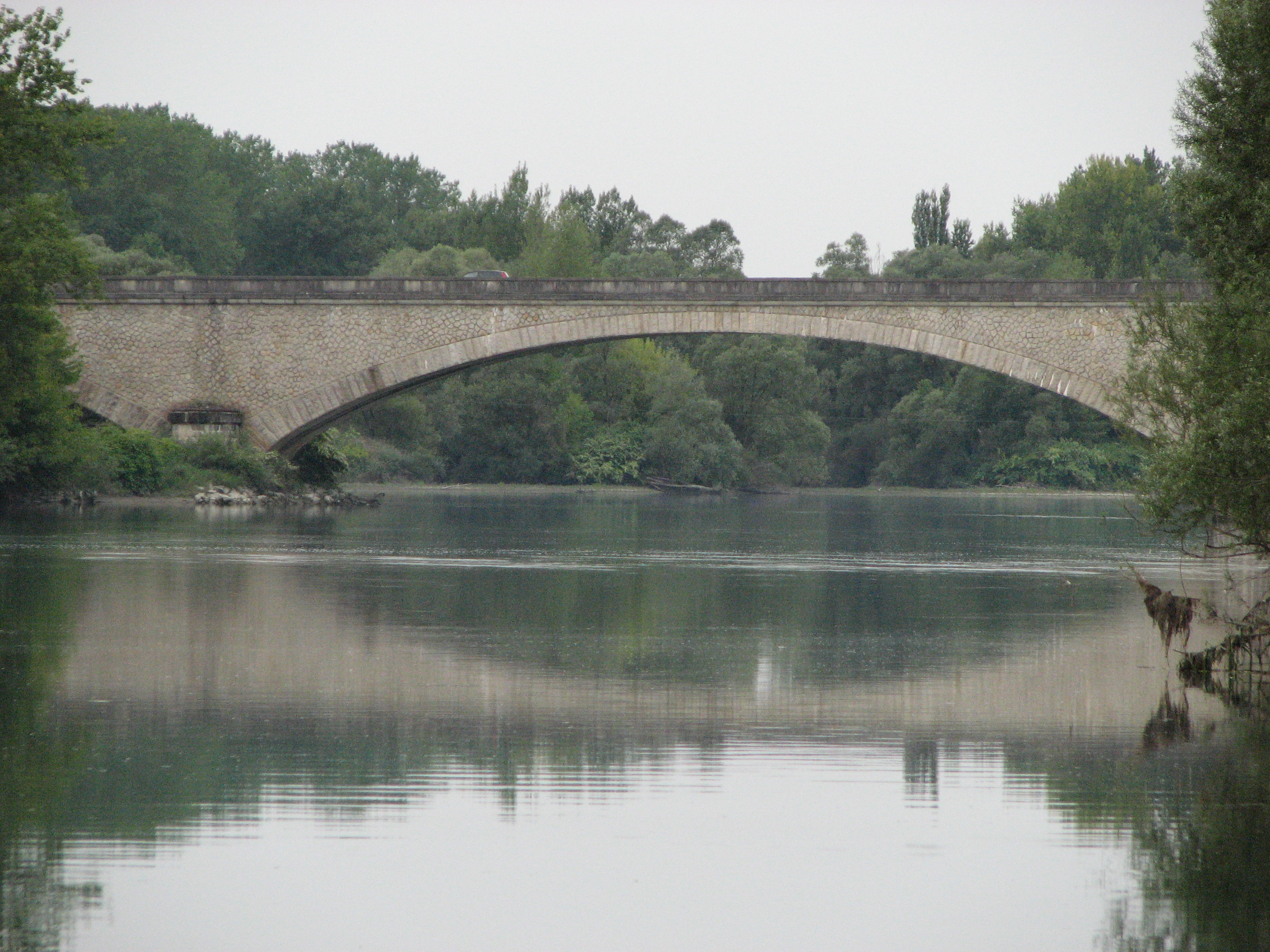
- Bridge across the Rhône at Les Avenières
- Location of Les Avenières
- Location within France Location within Auvergne-Rhône-Alpes
- Coordinates: 45°38′08″N 5°33′45″E
- Country: France
- Region: Auvergne-Rhône-Alpes
- Department: Isère
- Arrondissement: La Tour-du-Pin
- Canton: Morestel
- Commune: Les Avenières-Veyrins-Thuellin
- Area^{1}: 32 km^{2} (12 sq mi)
- Highest elevation: 260 m (850 ft)
- Lowest elevation: 200 m (660 ft)
- Population (2022): 5,604
  - Density: 180/km^{2} (450/sq mi)
- Time zone: UTC+01:00 (CET)
  - Summer (DST): UTC+02:00 (CEST)
- Postal code: 38630
- ^{1} French Land Register data, which excludes lakes, ponds, glaciers > 1 km^{2} (0.386 sq mi or 247 acres) and river estuaries.

Les Avenières (French pronunciation: [lez‿avənjɛʁ]) is a former commune in the Isère department in the Rhône-Alpes region of south-eastern France. On 1 January 2016, it was merged into the new commune of Les Avenières-Veyrins-Thuellin.

== Geography ==
Les Avenières lies on the left bank of the Rhône as it loops north some 25 km east by north-east of Bourgoin-Jallieu and 25 km west by north-west of Chambéry. The Rhone river forms the north-eastern border of the commune and is also the border between Isère and Ain departments. Access to the commune is by road D450 from Veyrins-Thuellin in the south-west which goes to the village then continues south-east to Saint-Genix-sur-Guiers. The D33 goes from Morestel in the north-west and passes through the north of the commune and across the Rhône bridge where it becomes the D10 and goes north-east to join the D19. The D40B goes north from the village to join the D33. The D40E connects the D40 at the eastern edge of the commune to the D40B. Apart from the village there are the hamlets of Le Chamolay, Curtille, Le Grand Chaffard, Le Maitre, Le Bessey, Le Sablonnet, and Les Nappes. The commune has a large forest in the north-east on the Île Molettes with a large urban area in the centre mixed with farmland, and in the south mixed forest and farmland.

The north-western border of the commune consists entirely of a left branch of the Rhône river as it loops north on its course through Lyon south to the Mediterranean. The Grand Canal de l'Huert forms the south-western border of the commune which curves to join the Huert river which is part of the northern border of the commune. The Canal du Champ forms the southern border of the commune where it connects the Grand Canal de l'Huert to the Bièvre river which forms the south-eastern border of the commune flowing north-east to join the Rhône.

=== Neighbouring communes and villages ===
Source:

== Toponymy ==
The name Avenières is derived from the Franco-Provençal avena meaning "oats".

== History ==
=== Prehistory ===
From the late Neolithic to the middle Bronze Age the region was inhabited by farmers. A scythe found in Les Avenières region is preserved in the Vienne Museum. It is the only evidence of human occupation before the Gallo-Romans. It was found at the confluence of the Bièvre and the Rhône.

=== Roman Era ===
In 1989 maintenance work undertaken in the La Cour du Pont district led to the discovery of two oak piles at a depth of 2 metres. A Carbon-14 study undertaken by the centre for chronology at the Claude Bernard University Lyon 1 (CNRS) gave a date between 39 BC and 120 AD. It is possible that they were piles for a Gallo-Roman bridge used to cross the Rhone between Les Avenières and Thuellin.

=== From the Middle Ages to modern times ===
- In 1330 Aigline de Gerbais was married to Louis de Rivoire, knight, lord of Romagnieu, Domessin, la Bâtie-Montgascon, Villeneuve de Ciers (les Avenières), and Bruzolo en Piémont.
- In 1496 notes and coins prove that Humbert of Baternay was deprived of the proceeds of the sale and transfer of the lands of Dolomieu and Avenières by King Charles VIII.
- In October 1496 Charles VIII issued Letters Patent ceding Dolomieu and Avenieres to Humbert of Bagternay.
- On 22 January 1560 copies were made of letters agreed to by King Charles with René de Baternay on the subject of the lands of Ornacieux, Dolomieu, and Les Avenières.
- On 8 October 1609 Gabrielle de Baternay, widow of Gaspard de la Chastre, sold the lands and lordships of Avenières and Brangues as well as the Barony of Bouchage to M. of Granieu and Dorgeoise.
- In July 1523 letters from François I stated that the possession of the lands of Dolomieu and Avenières was held by René de Baternay. An order from the King's Council showed that René de Baternay would be restored to possession of the lands of Dolomieu and Avenières.
- On 15 March 1642 there was a memoir and instructions on the subject of the proceedings of the King's Council regarding the lands of Dolomieu and Avenières.

=== 20th Century ===
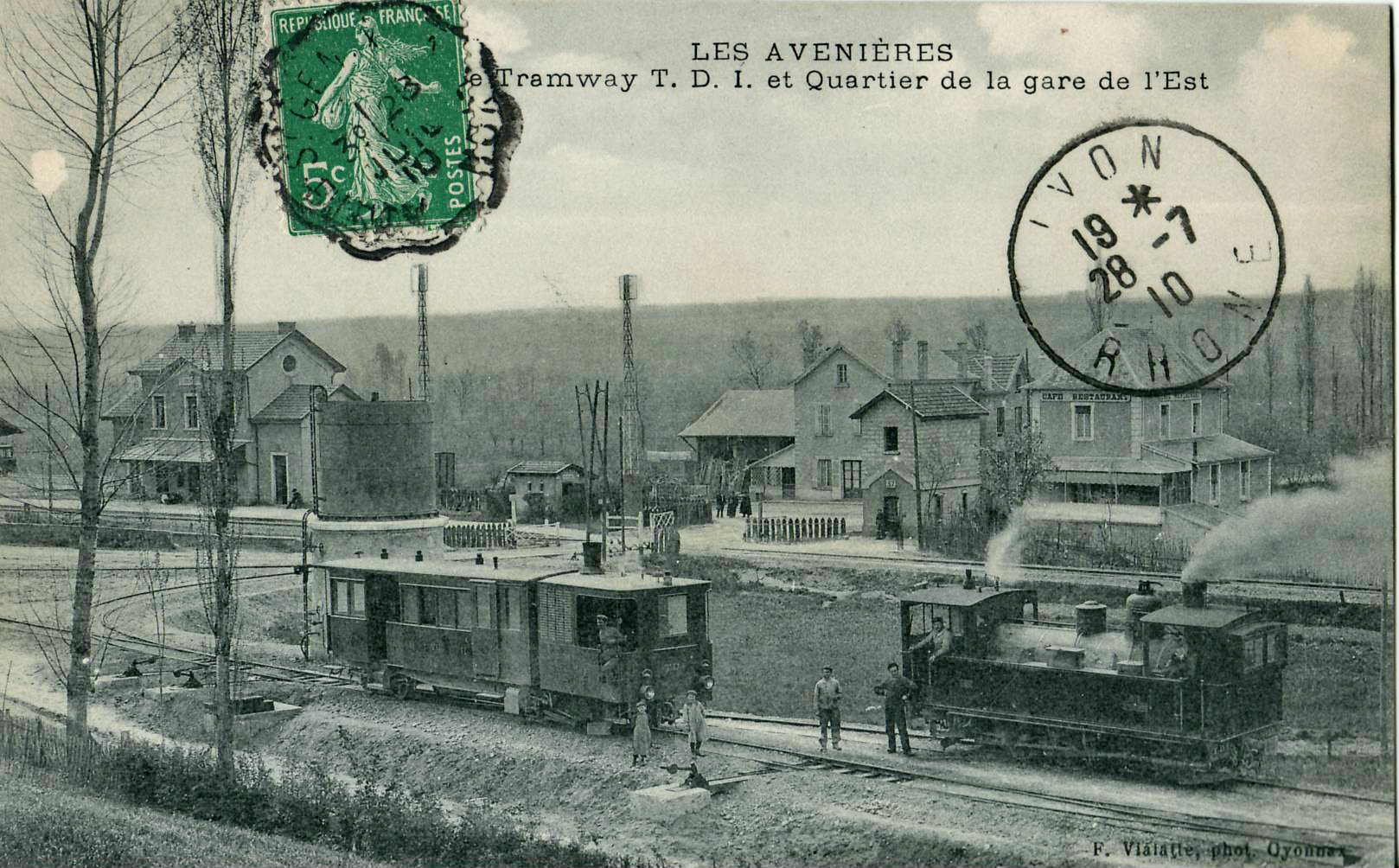
The station area around 1909: in the foreground the TDI station and at left l'Est de Lyon station.

At the beginning of the 20th century the town was served two secondary railways: the Chemin de fer de l'Est de Lyon to Lyon and Aosta, and the Tramways départementaux de l'Isère, which was taken over by Tramways de l'Ouest du Dauphiné, to La Tour-du-Pin. This last operated from 1909 to 1935.

== Administration ==
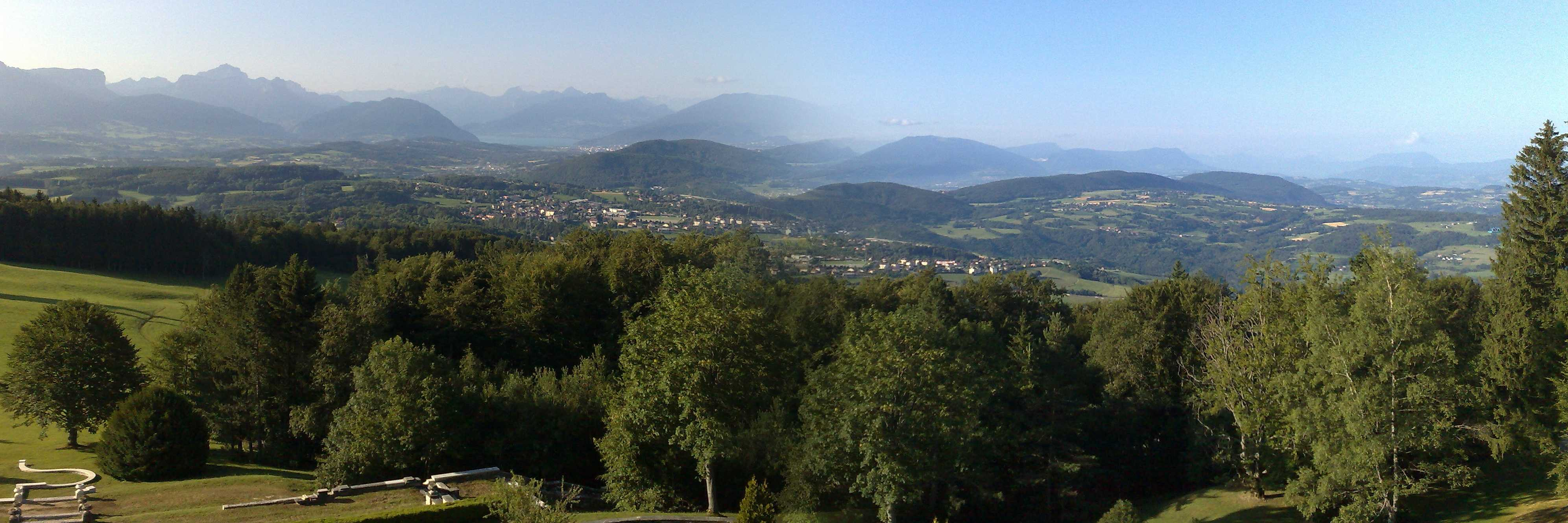
View from the Chateau of Avenières

List of Successive Mayors

Mayors from 1800 to 1941

From	To	Name
1800	1801	Pierre Guiguet
1801	1804	Louis Bayet
1804	1805	Benoît Varnet
1805	1815	Jacques Pelisson
1815	1815	François Charvet
1815	1818	Joseph Bourjaillat
1818	1830	François Reynaud
1830	1842	Joseph Mesly
1842	1847	Louis Charvet
1847	1856	Marie-Joseph Jacquier
1856	1860	Joseph Orcel
1860	1870	Louis Henri Guiguet
1870	1871	Xavier Mesly
1871	1873	Louis Henri Guiguet
1873	1874	Eugène Perriolat
1874	1884	Edouard Marion
1884	1888	François Berlioz
1888	1891	Edouard Marion
1891	1896	Adrien Mesly
1896	1912	Claude Cattoz
1912	1925	Maurice Rullier
1925	1941	Antonin Chabert

Mayors from 1941

From	To	Name
1941	1944	André Liard
1944	1945	Eugène Satonnet
1945	1947	Jean Bourde
1947	1965	Emile Richerd
1965	1980	Jean Bedet
1980	1989	Marius Louis Monnet
1989	1993	Roger Gagneux
1993	1995	Aimé Chaboud
1995	2001	Emile Vasquez
2001	2014	Gilbert Mergoud
2014	2016	Daniel Michoud

== Demography ==
The inhabitants of the commune are known as Avenièrants or Avenièrantes in French.

Historical population

Year	Pop.	±% p.a.
1793	2,234	—
1800	2,321	+0.55%
1806	2,911	+3.85%
1821	3,283	+0.80%
1831	3,428	+0.43%
1836	3,681	+1.43%
1841	3,863	+0.97%
1846	4,037	+0.89%
1851	4,256	+1.06%
1856	4,367	+0.52%
1861	4,106	−1.22%
1866	4,200	+0.45%
1872	4,002	−0.80%
1876	4,133	+0.81%
1881	4,205	+0.35%
1886	4,013	−0.93%
1891	4,113	+0.49%
1896	3,932	−0.90%

Year	Pop.	±% p.a.
1901	4,015	+0.42%
1906	3,945	−0.35%
1911	3,776	−0.87%
1921	3,321	−1.28%
1926	3,282	−0.24%
1931	3,221	−0.37%
1936	3,133	−0.55%
1946	3,008	−0.41%
1954	2,986	−0.09%
1962	3,117	+0.54%
1968	3,181	+0.34%
1975	3,402	+0.96%
1982	3,495	+0.39%
1990	3,933	+1.49%
1999	4,308	+1.02%
2007	4,980	+1.83%
2012	5,487	+1.96%
2022	5,604	+0.21%

Source: EHESS and INSEE

== Culture and heritage ==
=== Civil heritage ===
- The Chateau Bertaudières
- The Chateau Cerisier
- The Chateau Eau-Morte
- The André Moiroud Stadium (formerly Epinettes Stadium), owned by the HOC
- The Walibi Rhône-Alpes Amusement Park

=== Religious heritage ===
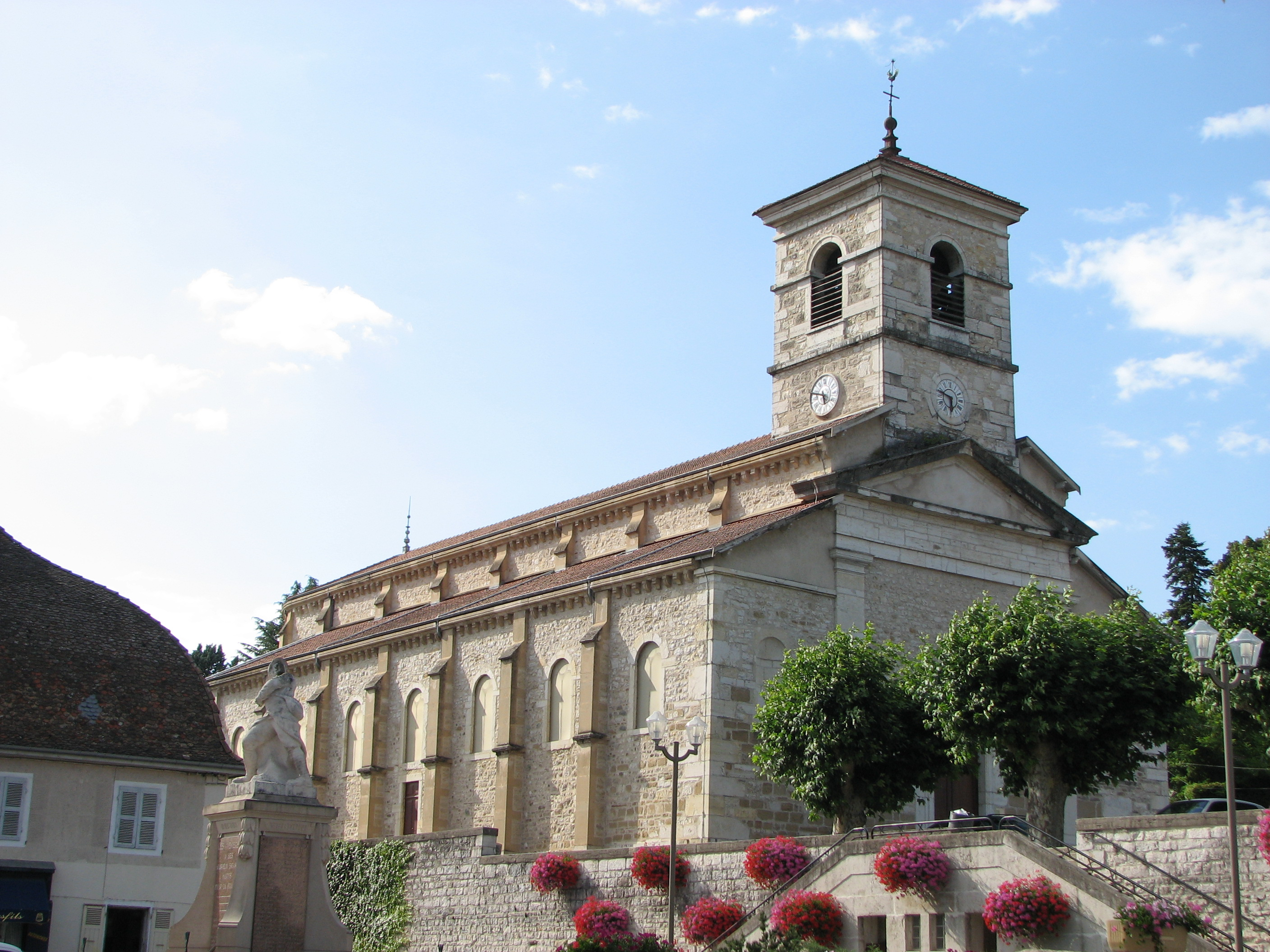
The Church of Buvin

- The Church of Buvin. The Church contains a Bronze Bell (1661) which is registered as an historical object.

=== Environmental heritage ===
- The alluvial area of Rhône du Pont de Groslée at Murs-et-Gélignieux
- The Huert river and wetland
- The Corangle wetland
- The Corneille wetland and lake

== See also ==
- Communes of the Isère department

=== Bibliography ===
- Aimé Bocquet, The problem of palafittic occupation in the north of lower Dauphiné. From the late Neolithic to the middle Bronze Ages, Bulletin de la Société préhistorique française, Vol. 64, No. 2, 1967, pp. 501–516 (in French)
- Ulysse Robert, General catalogue of manuscripts in the public libraries of France: Departments, Plon, Nourrit & cie (Paris), 1903, Vol. 41 (in French)
- N2007-RA-0098, Bleu Stéphane, 2007, Gallia, adlfi website (in French)
