= Glandieu Fall =

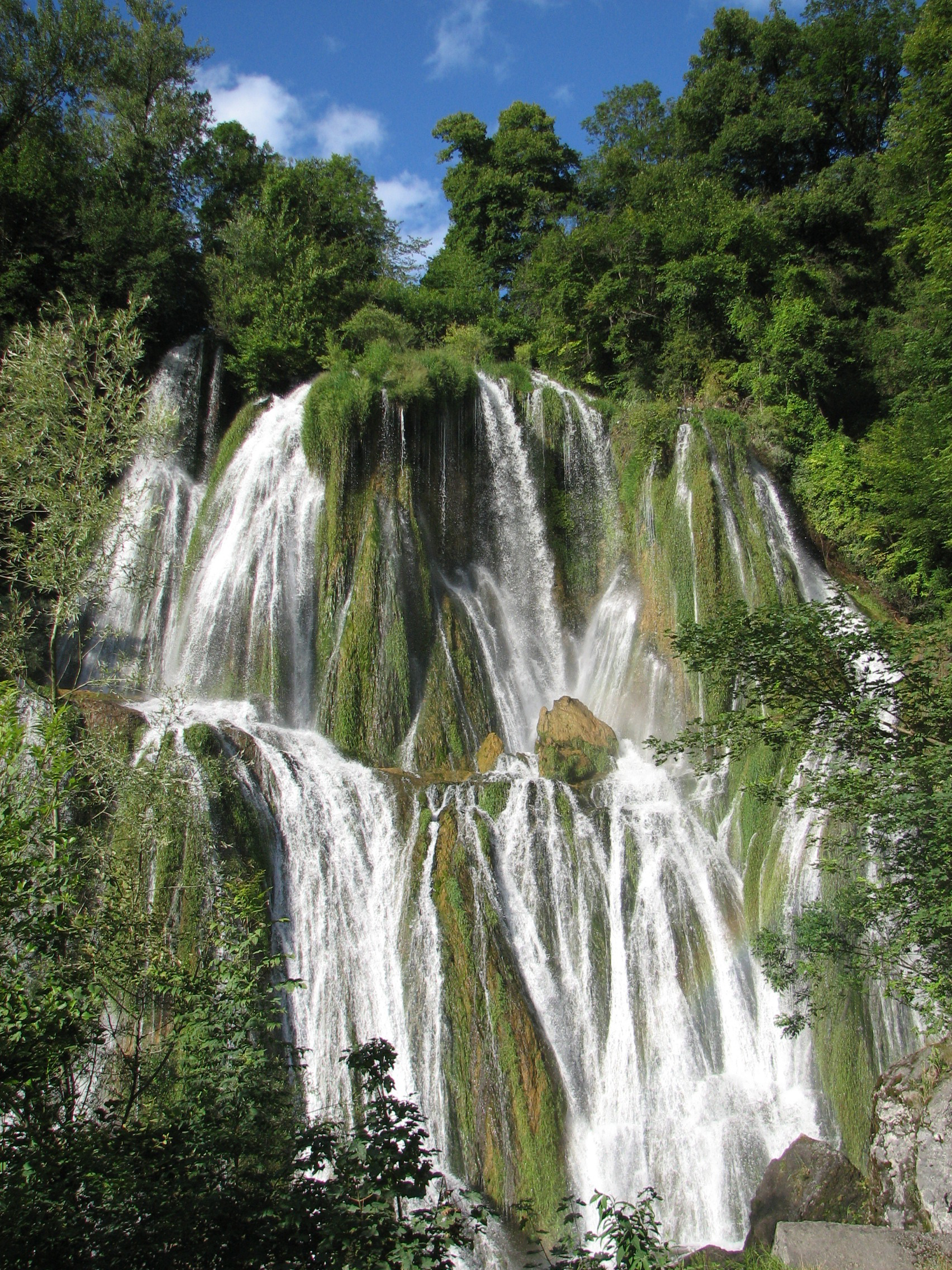
- Glandieu Fall

- Location within France
- Location: Glandieu, Ain (France)
- Coordinates: 45°39′55″N 5°36′50″E
- Elevation: ~ 210 m
- Total height: 60 m (200 ft)
- Number of drops: 2
- Longest drop: 210 m (690 ft)
- Watercourse: Gland

The Glandieu Fall (French: Cascade de Glandieu) is a small waterfall in France. The fall is situated in Glandieu, in the Ain Department, between the villages of Brégnier-Cordon and Saint-Benoît.

It consists of two consecutive waterfall steps, for a total height of 60 metres, which carry the water of the Gland into the Rhône basin.

Until few time ago there was a marble quarry near the waterfall, in Brégnier-Cordon area, which used its hydroelectric energy. Two small hydroelectric power stations are still in operation, one for each municipality.

== Gallery ==
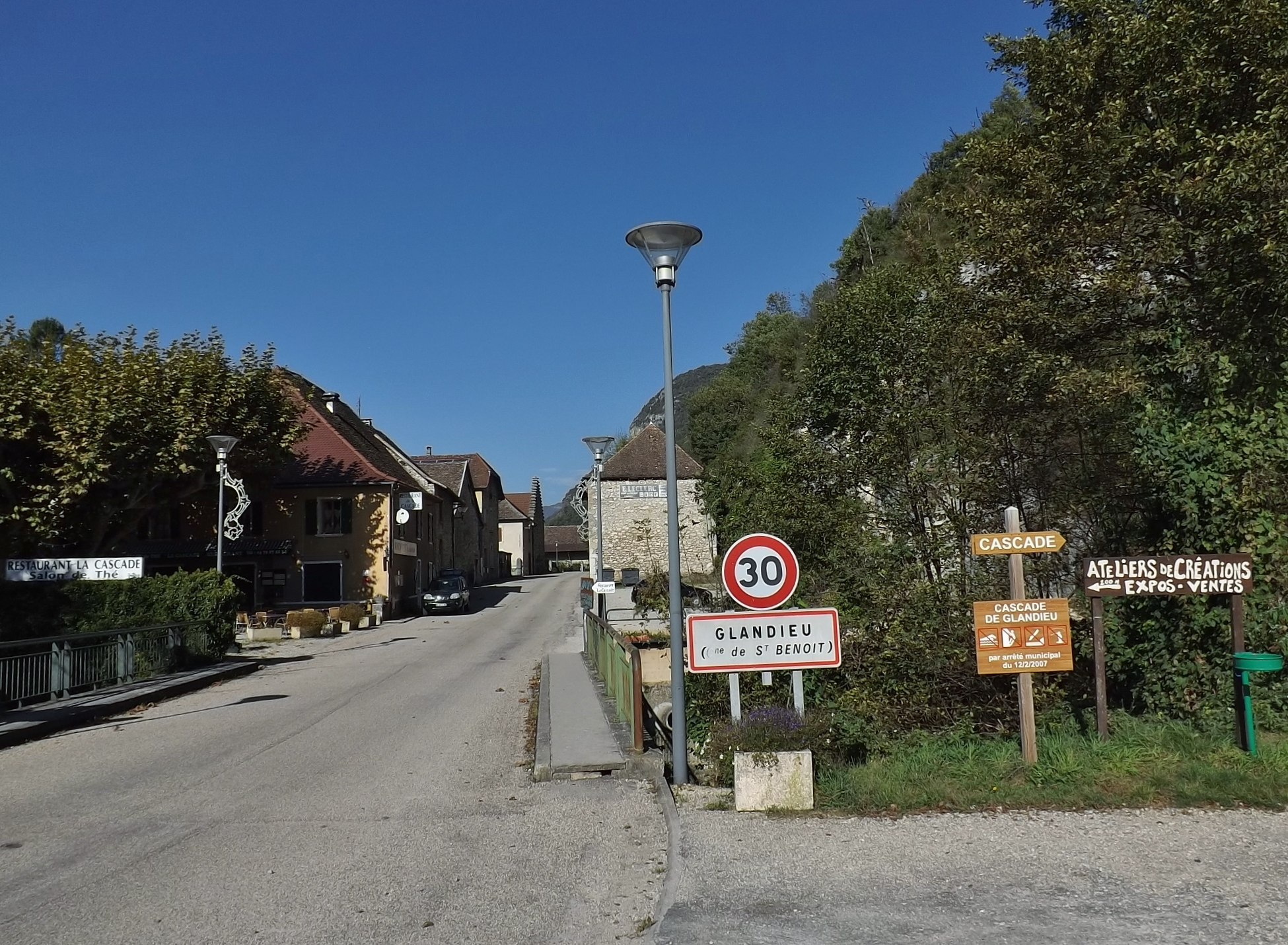
The limit between Brégnier-Cordon and Saint-Benoît with, right side, the label to the Fall.

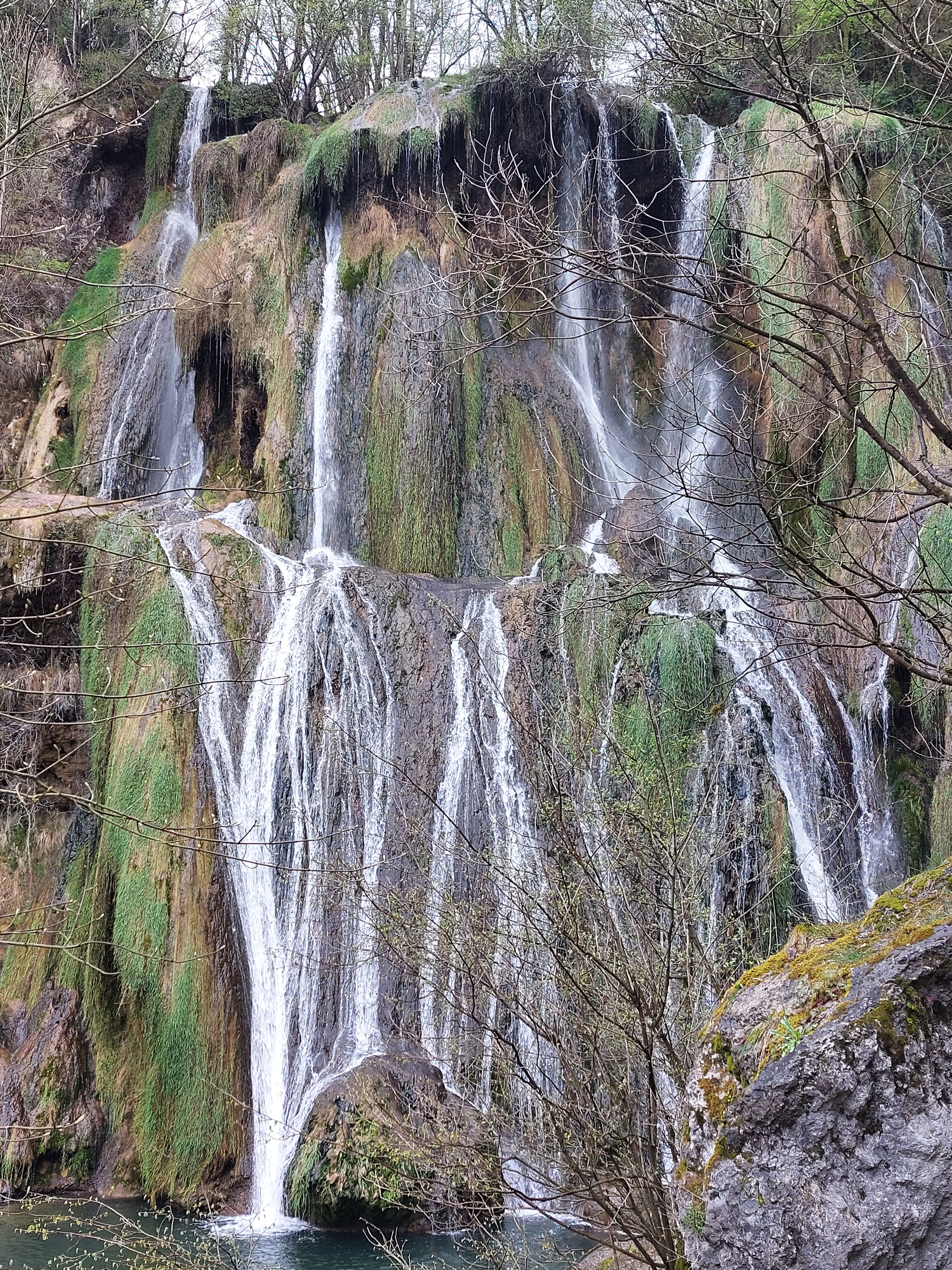
Other view of the Fall.
