= Château de Cordon =

French fortified castle

Coordinates: 45°37′15″N 5°37′33″E

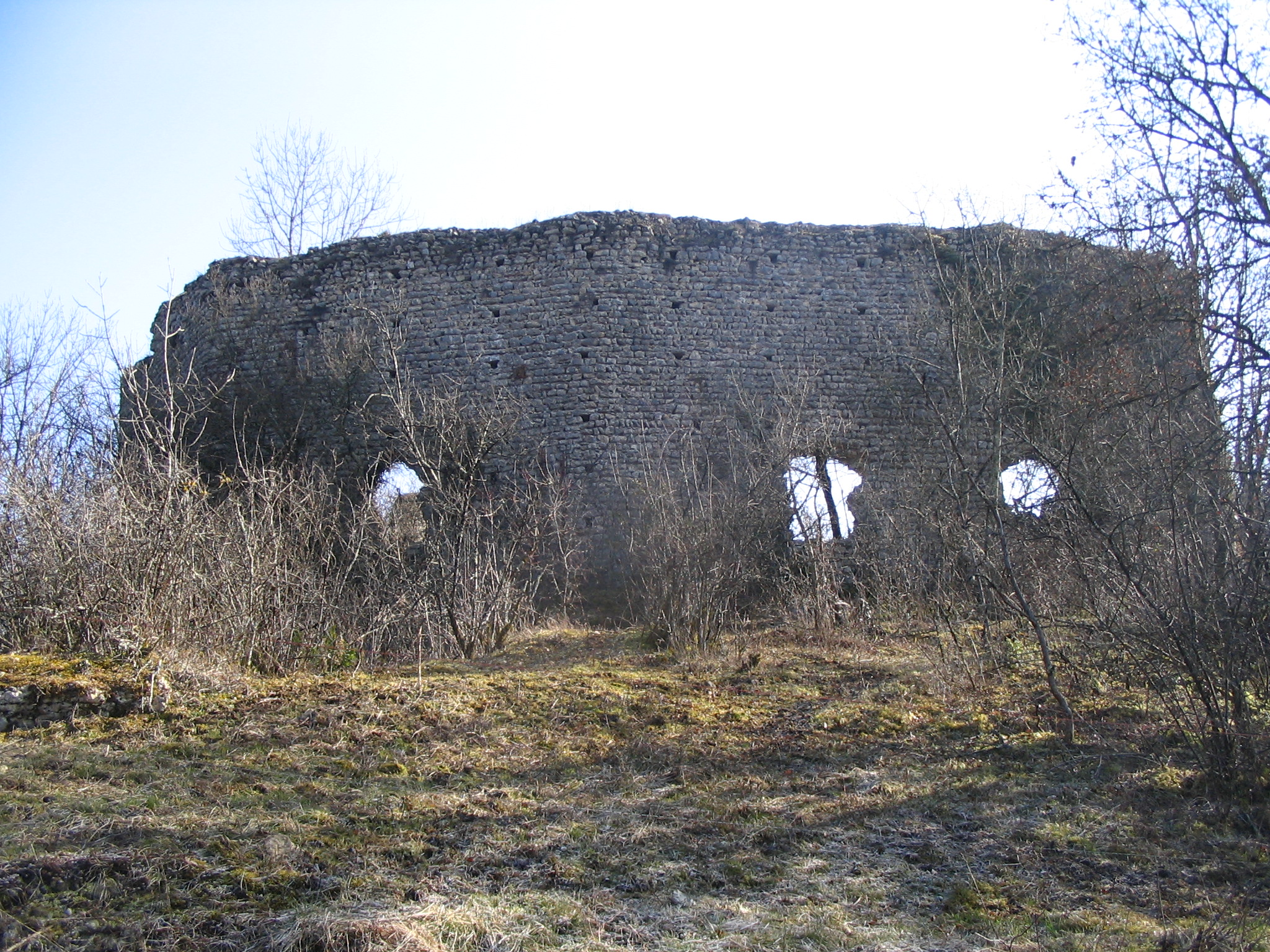
Entrance to Chateau de Cordon, 2013

The Château de Cordon is a ruined feudal castle in the commune of Brégnier-Cordon in the Ain département of France.

== History ==
The House of Cordon is one of the oldest in the historical region of Bugey. They were invested by the Holy Roman Emperor in the 11th century. Since then, the castle remained in the possession of the family, one of the oldest in Savoy.

Ideally placed on a high point dominating the Rhône, it served as a look-out post on the marches of Savoy. It was seized in 1434 by Amadeus VIII, Duke of Savoy, from Aynard II de Cordon who had taken up arms against his sovereign. The castle was dismantled and the Cordons deprived of the title of Lord of Cordon. Having later recovered the lordship of Cordon and justice, the Cordons resided at the Château de la Barre.

The castle is situated on a hill (altitude 240 metres (790 ft)), dominating the plain of the Rhône 40 metres (130 ft) below.

Destroyed probably in the 17th century, it was later used as a quarry.

== Architecture ==
All that remains is a part of the surrounding wall whose large openings dominate the Rhône.

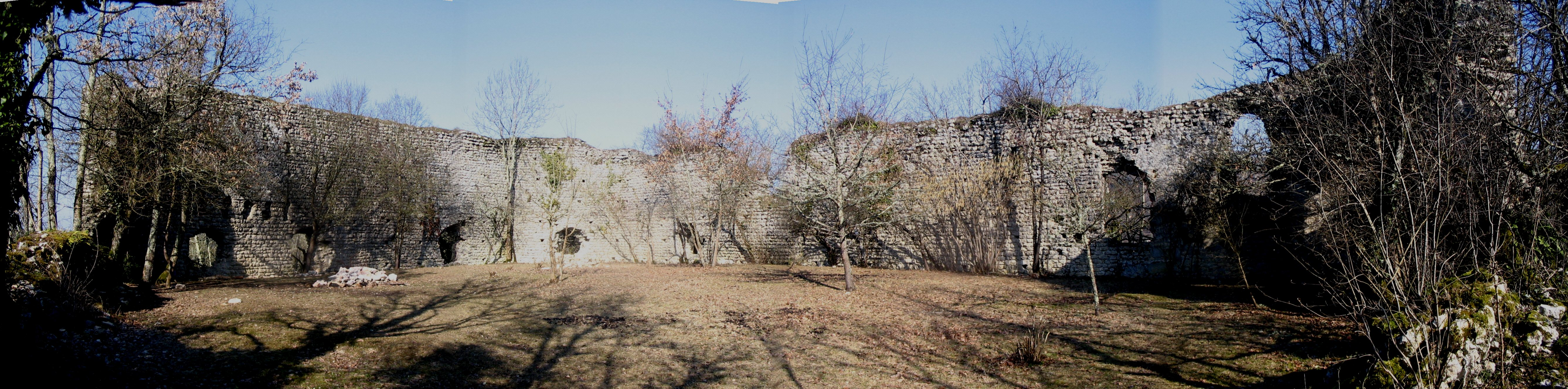
View of the ruins from the inside

== See also ==
- List of castles in France
