= Glandieu =

Part of Saint-Benoît and Brégnier-Cordon in Auvergne-Rhône-Alpes, France

Coordinates: 45°40′04″N 5°36′45″E

Location of Glandieu in Auvergne-Rhône-Alpes

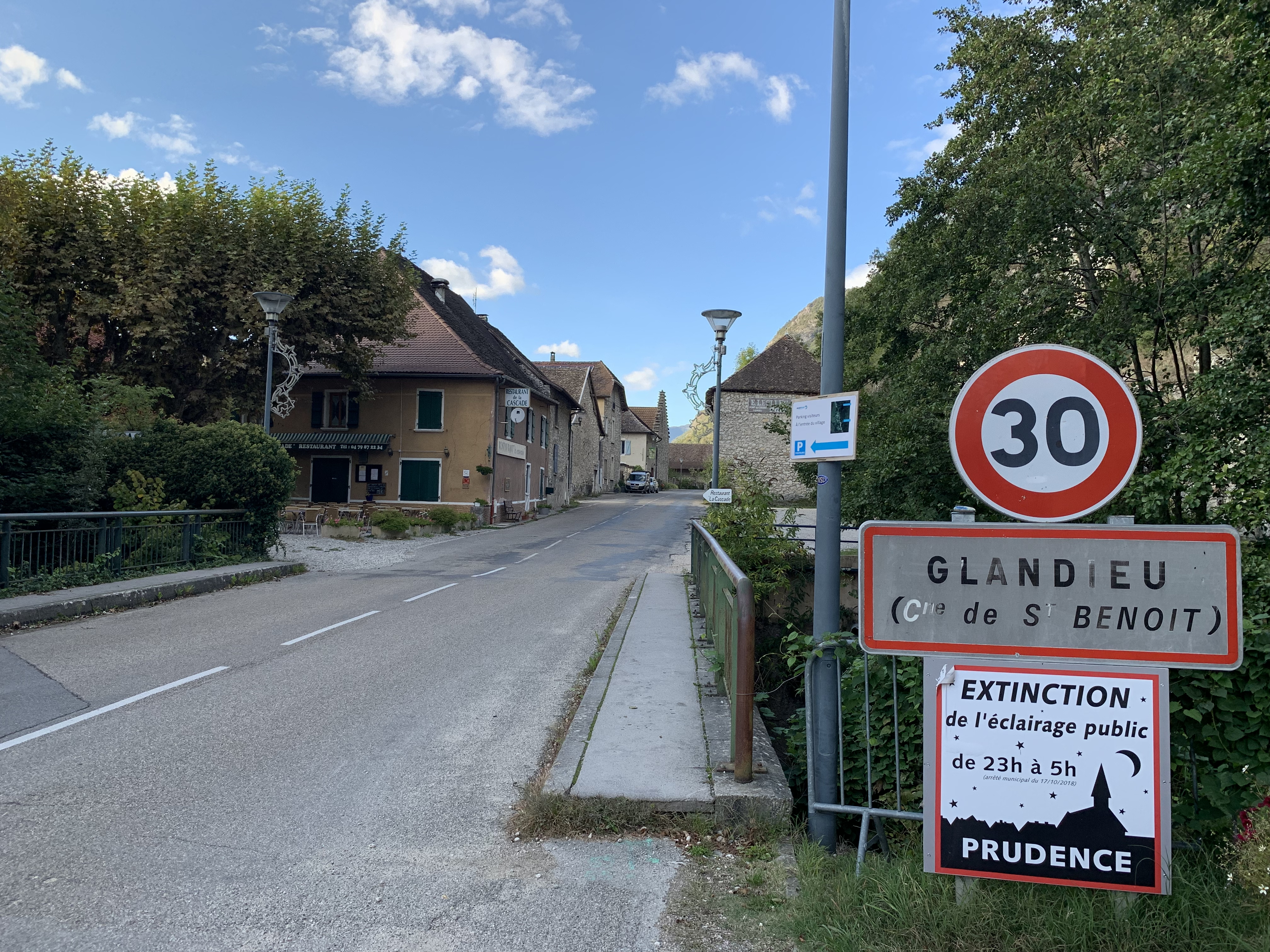
Glandieu

Glandieu (French pronunciation: [ɡlɑ̃djø]; Arpitan: Glandieu) is a village in the Ain department in eastern France. It is divided on the territory of two communes by the Gland, which here forms the Glandieu waterfall.

The northern part of Glandieu is annexed to the commune of Groslée-Saint-Benoît. The southern part belongs to that of Brégnier-Cordon. Besides the waterfall, Glandieu is also known for its cave and lake.

Unlike the other "ieu" toponyms of the region (Izieu, Peyrieu, etc.), Glandieu derives its name from the Gallic and from the roots "glano" (pure) and "eu" (water).

== See also ==
- Communes of the Ain department

== Photo gallery ==
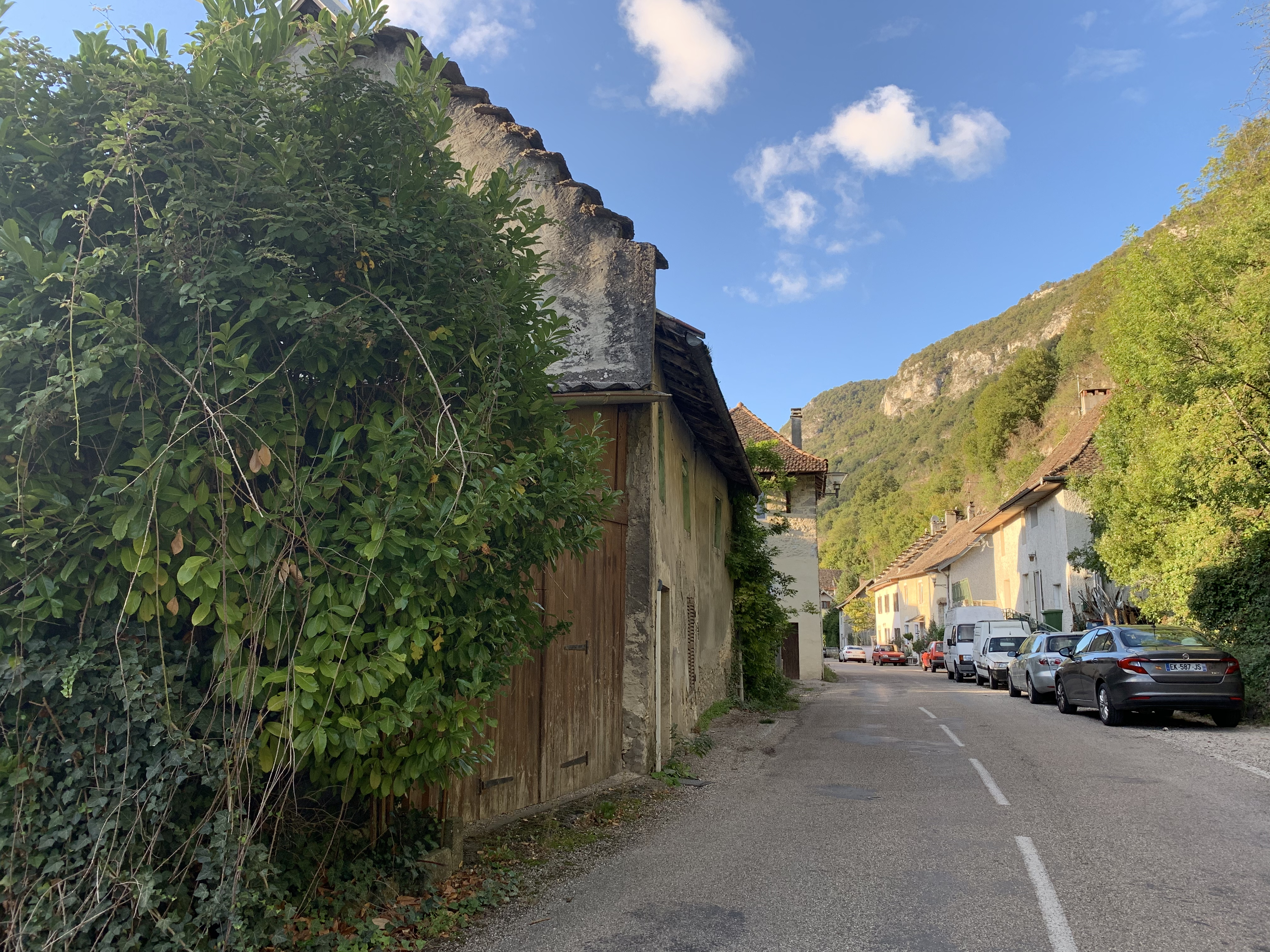

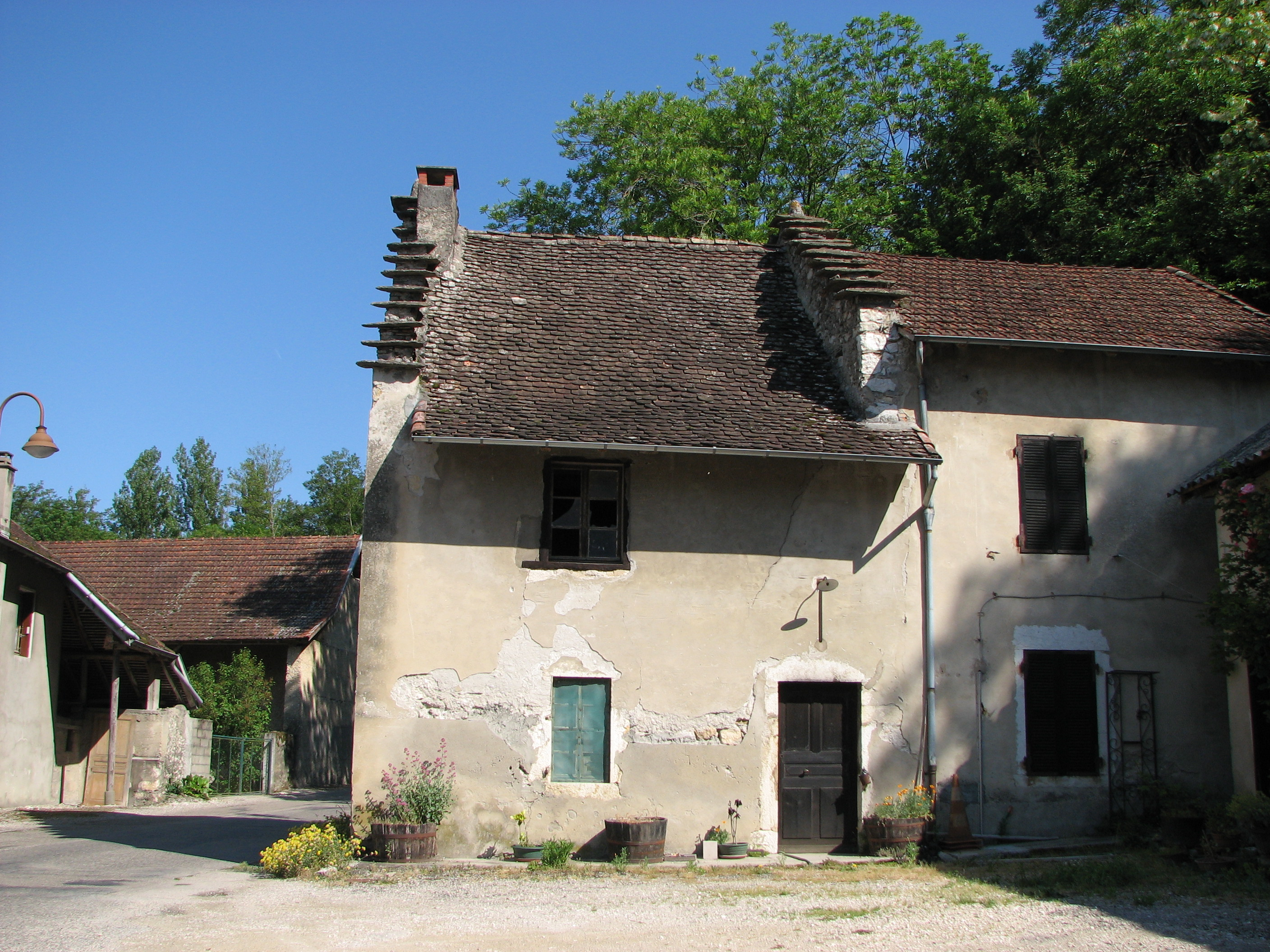
