= Château de la Barre =

Castle in Brégnier-Cordon, France

Coordinates: 45°37′56″N 5°37′22″E

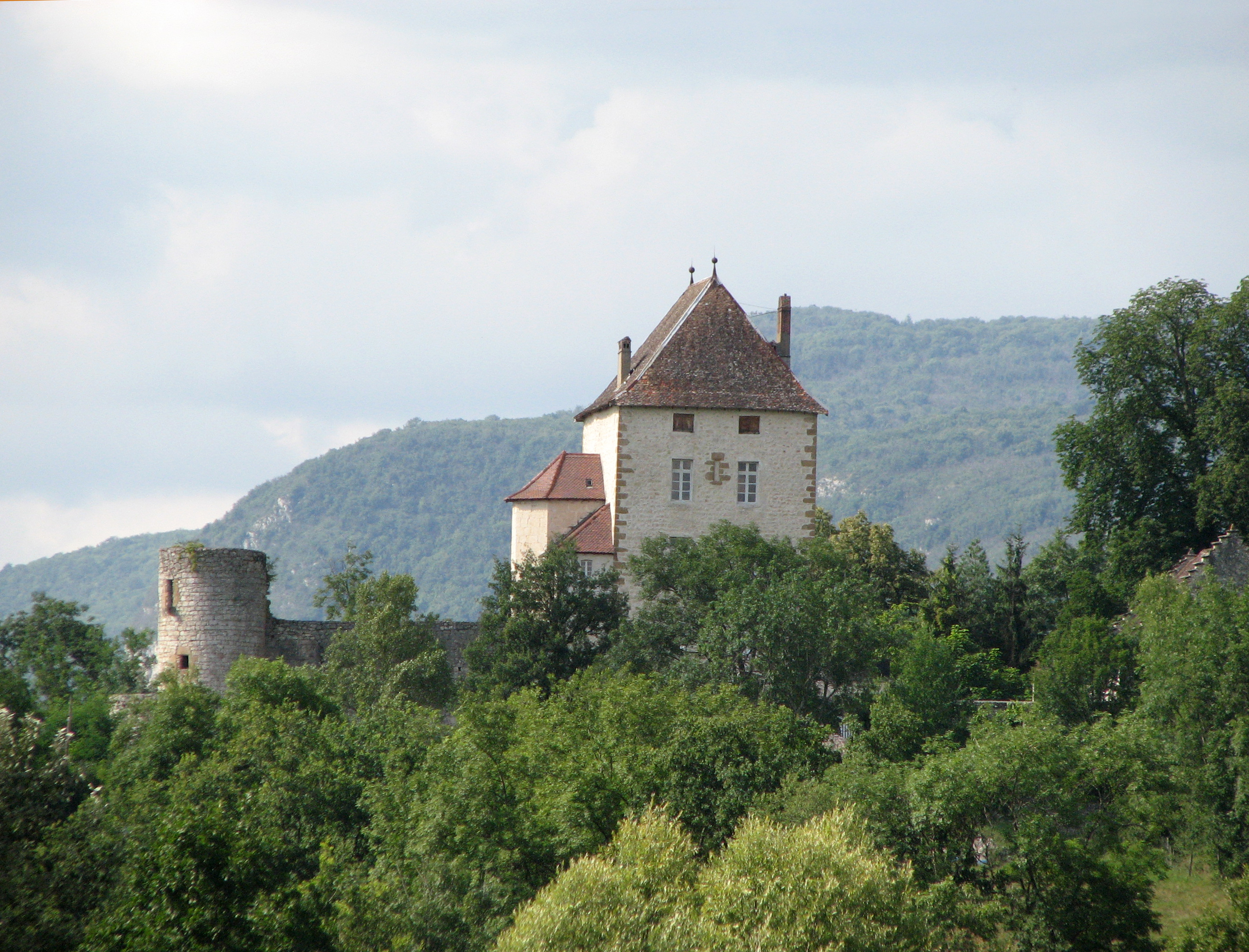
- Interactive map of the Château de la Barre area

General information
- Location: Brégnier-Cordon, Ain, France
- Completed: 14th century
- Renovated: 20th century
- Owner: House of Cordon

The Château de la Barre is a residence in the commune of Brégnier-Cordon in the Ain département of France. It stands on the western slope of the Mont de Cordon.

The main building dates from the 20th century, but the fortifications date back to a 14th-century castle. The château was originally a court of justice and a toll collection centre, hence its name "La Barre".

== History ==
The Château de la Barre belonged to the House of Cordon, who moved here following the destruction of the nearby Château de Cordon. Its position above the Rhône allowed it to command traffic on the river.

== Le Rouge et le Noir ==
The castle was the scene of a scandal involving a young seminarian from the village of Brangues, Antoine Berthe, engaged by the Duke in 1826 as tutor to his children. Berthet had seduced the young Henriette de Cordon, leading to his dismissal. Convinced that his former mistress, the wife of the mayor of Brangues, was behind his dismissal, he shot her in the church at Brangues. Arrested and condemned to death, he was executed in Grenoble in 1828.

Stendhal, who was familiar with courts and judicial affairs, was inspired by the story to write his novel, Le Rouge et le Noir (The Red and the Black).

== See also ==
- List of castles in France
