= Veyrins-Thuellin =

Commune in Isère, France

- Part of Les Avenières-Veyrins-Thuellin
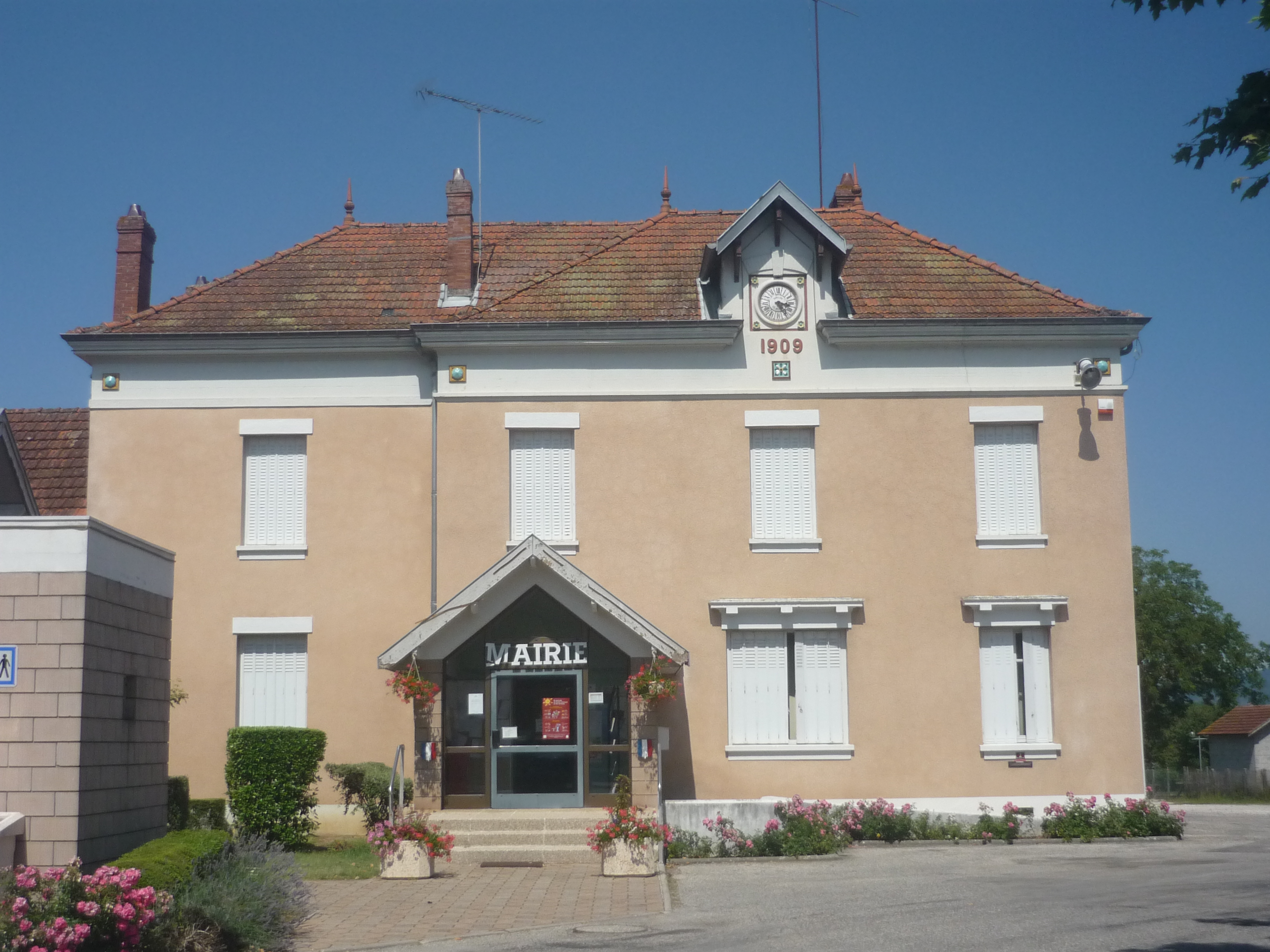
- Town hall
- Location of Veyrins-Thuellin
- Location within France Location within Auvergne-Rhône-Alpes
- Coordinates: 45°37′35″N 5°32′24″E
- Country: France
- Region: Auvergne-Rhône-Alpes
- Department: Isère
- Arrondissement: La Tour-du-Pin
- Canton: Morestel
- Commune: Les Avenières-Veyrins-Thuellin
- Area^{1}: 11.56 km^{2} (4.46 sq mi)
- Elevation: 235 m (771 ft)
- Highest elevation: 322 m (1,056 ft)
- Lowest elevation: 204 m (669 ft)
- Population (2022): 2,095
  - Density: 181.2/km^{2} (469.4/sq mi)
- Time zone: UTC+01:00 (CET)
  - Summer (DST): UTC+02:00 (CEST)
- Postal code: 38630
- ^{1} French Land Register data, which excludes lakes, ponds, glaciers > 1 km^{2} (0.386 sq mi or 247 acres) and river estuaries.

Veyrins-Thuellin (French pronunciation: [veʁɛ̃ tɥɛlɛ̃]) is a former commune in the Isère department in southeastern France. It was created in 1972 by the merger of the former communes Veyrins and Thuellin. On 1 January 2016, it was merged into the new commune of Les Avenières-Veyrins-Thuellin.

== Population ==
Historical population
Year	Pop.	±% p.a.
1975	1,261	—
1982	1,315	+0.60%
1990	1,328	+0.12%
1999	1,482	+1.23%
2006	1,698	+1.96%
2022	2,095	+1.32%
Source: EHESS and INSEE

== See also ==
- Communes of the Isère department
