= Les Avenières-Veyrins-Thuellin =

- Commune
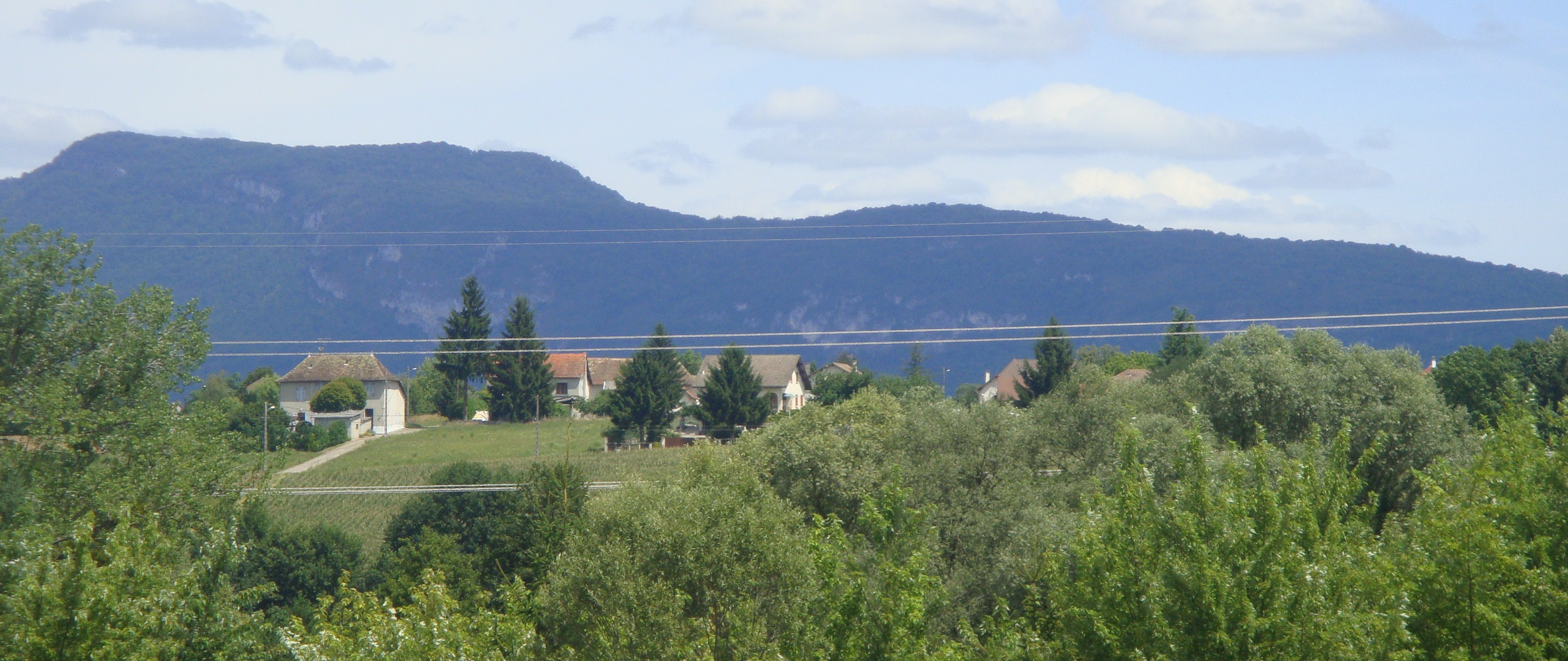
- Les Avenières seen from the park of Walibi
- Location of Les Avenières-Veyrins-Thuellin
- Location within France Location within Auvergne-Rhône-Alpes
- Coordinates: 45°38′06″N 5°33′47″E
- Country: France
- Region: Auvergne-Rhône-Alpes
- Department: Isère
- Arrondissement: La Tour-du-Pin
- Canton: Morestel

Government
  - Mayor (2021–2026): Myriam Boiteux
- Area^{1}: 41.56 km^{2} (16.05 sq mi)
- Population (2023): 7,698
  - Density: 185.2/km^{2} (479.7/sq mi)
- Time zone: UTC+01:00 (CET)
  - Summer (DST): UTC+02:00 (CEST)
- INSEE/Postal code: 38022 /38630
- ^{1} French Land Register data, which excludes lakes, ponds, glaciers > 1 km^{2} (0.386 sq mi or 247 acres) and river estuaries.

Les Avenières-Veyrins-Thuellin (French pronunciation: [lez‿avənjɛʁ veʁɛ̃ tɥɛlɛ̃]) is a commune in the Isère department of southeastern France. The municipality was established on 1 January 2016 and consists of the former communes of Les Avenières and Veyrins-Thuellin.

== Population ==
Population data refer to the commune in its geography as of January 2025.

Historical population
Year	Pop.	±% p.a.
1968	4,422	—
1975	4,663	+0.76%
1982	4,810	+0.44%
1990	5,261	+1.13%
1999	5,790	+1.07%
2007	6,740	+1.92%
2012	7,386	+1.85%
2017	7,739	+0.94%
2023	7,698	−0.09%
Source: INSEE

== See also ==
- Communes of the Isère department
