= Groslée-Saint-Benoît =

Commune in Auvergne-Rhône-Alpes, France

- Commune
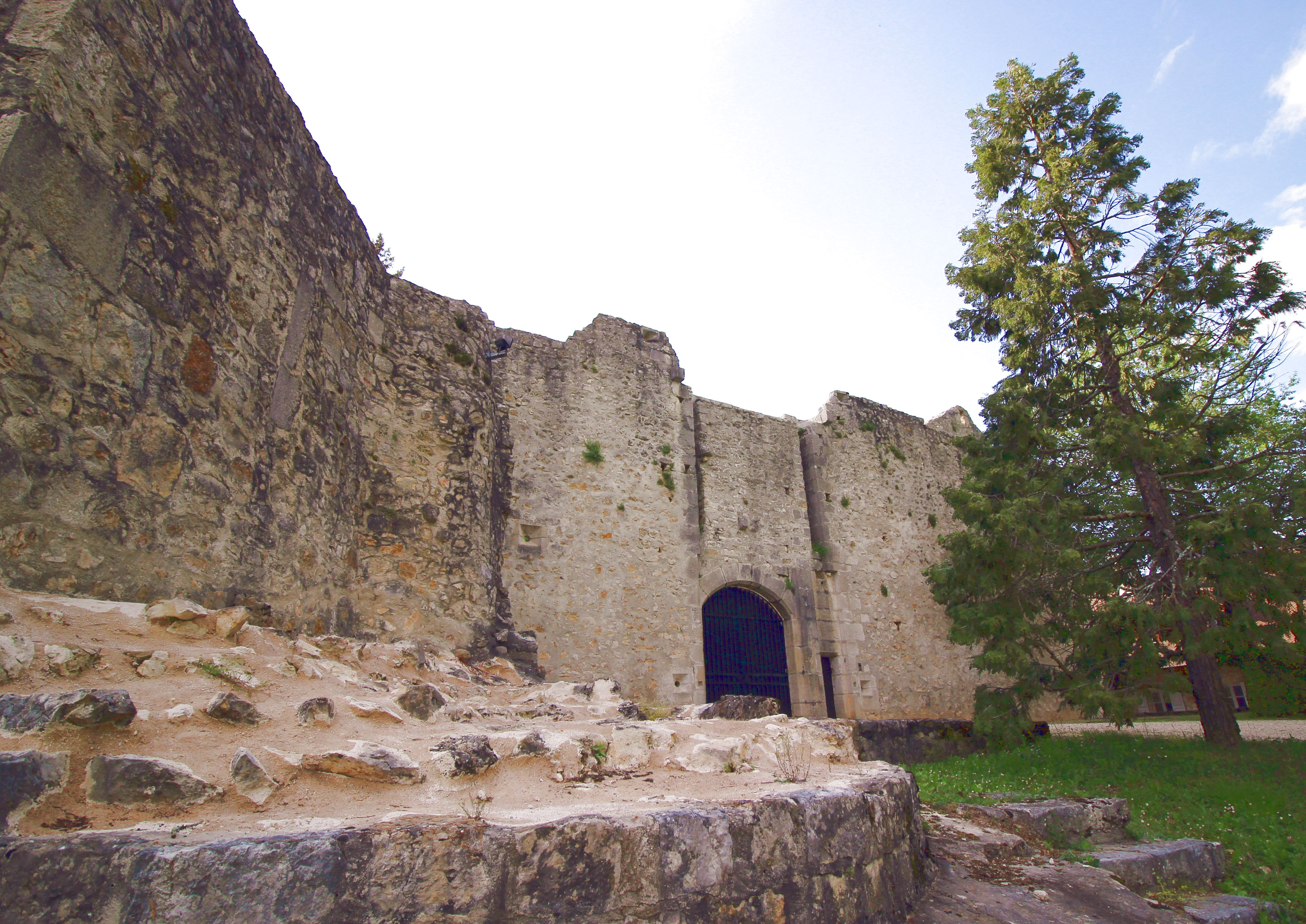
- Chateau
- Location of Groslée-Saint-Benoît
- Location within France Location within Auvergne-Rhône-Alpes
- Coordinates: 45°41′42″N 5°35′17″E
- Country: France
- Region: Auvergne-Rhône-Alpes
- Department: Ain
- Arrondissement: Belley
- Canton: Belley

Government
  - Mayor (2026–32): Justine de Villa
- Area^{1}: 28.92 km^{2} (11.17 sq mi)
- Population (2023): 1,227
  - Density: 42.43/km^{2} (109.9/sq mi)
- Time zone: UTC+01:00 (CET)
  - Summer (DST): UTC+02:00 (CEST)
- INSEE/Postal code: 01338 /01300, 01680
- ^{1} French Land Register data, which excludes lakes, ponds, glaciers > 1 km^{2} (0.386 sq mi or 247 acres) and river estuaries.

Groslée-Saint-Benoît (French pronunciation: [ɡʁole sɛ̃ bənwa]) is a commune in the Ain department of eastern France. The municipality was incorporated on 1 January 2016 and consists of the former communes of Groslée and Saint-Benoît.

== Politics and administration ==
=== Municipal administration ===
==== List of mayors ====
List of successive mayors of Groslée-Saint-Benoît
In office		Mayor	Party	Capacity	Ref.
14 January 2016	Incumbent	Henri Soudan			

== See also ==
- Communes of the Ain department
